= Ag-Chem Equipment =

American agricultural equipment manufacturer

Ag-Chem Equipment Company
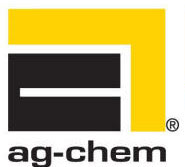
- Industry: Manufacturer
- Founded: 1963
- Founder: Al McQuinn
- Defunct: 2001
- Headquarters: Jackson, Minnesota, United States
- Area served: Worldwide
- Products: Agricultural equipment Self-propelled sprayers

Ag-Chem Equipment Company was a manufacturer of nutrient and pesticide application equipment that was founded in Jackson, Minnesota USA. It was sold to AGCO Corporation in 2001.

== History ==
After receiving his bachelor's degree from the University of Missouri in 1954, Al McQuinn, the founder of Ag-Chem Equipment Co., served in the Army until 1957. Upon his departure from the armed forces, he went to work for Federal Chemical Company which sold row crop sprayers. These sprayers and others like it didn't do a very good job of applying product. The solubles in the product would often settle in the solution which led to inconsistent, watered-down applications and unhappy customers.

In 1963, McQuinn set out to find a "solution for his solution". He developed a sparger agitator, a device which recirculates liquid product to keep the solubles suspended in their solution until they are applied, in a garage in Jackson, Minnesota. Ag-Chem Equipment Co., Inc. was born.

Advancements in fertilizer and farm chemical technology in the 1970s paved the way for more intense production agriculture in the United States. New fertility management practices, more acres in production, and the need for less soil compaction drove Ag-Chem's application equipment to larger capacity and higher flotation machines. In 1974, the company made its first acquisition by purchasing Ag-Tec, Inc. AgTec, Inc., a former subsidiary of Stokely-Van Camp, manufactured spray application equipment used in orchards, gardens, groves, and vineyards.

In 1980, Ag-Chem first appeared in "The Corporate Report 100", an annual ranking of Minnesota's largest publicly traded companies. In the same year the first international equipment sale was completed. Newly developed pneumatic dry spreaders required greater horsepower and efficiency and brought about the development of the 1800 and 1900 series TerraGators. The United States farm economy was severely depressed from 1981 to 1986. Major U.S. manufacturers were faced with consolidations, takeovers by foreign companies, and the elimination of established product lines. Ag-Chem continued to dominate its markets in 1981 in spite of deteriorating economic conditions. Rickel Manufacturing Co., a company founded by Ed Rickel and known for their "Terra Tires" and Big A product line, was acquired by Ag-Chem in 1983 and one year later Ag-Chem's first four-wheel flotation unit for agricultural use, the TerraGator 1664, was introduced

Ag-Chem lost money in 1985 and 1986. Its locally traded over-the-counter stock sold for pennies a share. In 1987, the company closed its Salina, Kansas, plant and consolidated production in Jackson: total company assets were reduced from $21.9 million to $11.6 million. According to the company, its cost-cutting programs and the loyalty of employees and suppliers helped Ag-Chem survive the period.

In 1991, Ag-Chem purchased Benson, Minnesota-based LorAl Products, Inc. and a 60% share of Soil Teq, Inc.'s holdings. Soil Teq, Inc. developed the patented SOILECTION process which was a pioneer in the variable-rate application of fertilizers and pesticides. The acquisition of both assets furthered the company's site-specific efforts to refine the concept of variable-rate application into a practical set of high-tech tools.

Conservation tillage in the 1990s required adaptation of new chemical and fertilizer application technologies for post-emergent weed control. Ag-Chem responded by bringing the RoGator 664 to market in 1993. Agriculture professionals recognized the potential of site-specific resource management from an agronomic perspective as well as the economic and environmental benefits. In 1995, Ag-Chem purchased the remaining 40% interest in Soil Teq, Inc. and continued to develop a comprehensive "total package". Expanded offerings included continually updated mapping software, variable-rate product controllers, and variable-rate application systems.

In 2001, the company was purchased by AGCO Corporation. The acquisition was beneficial to both parties as Ag-Chem now had larger funding, engineering, and distribution tools at its disposal and AGCO gained a solid foothold in the self-propelled application market among the other major Ag equipment manufacturers.

== Machine models ==
=== First self-propelled sprayer ===
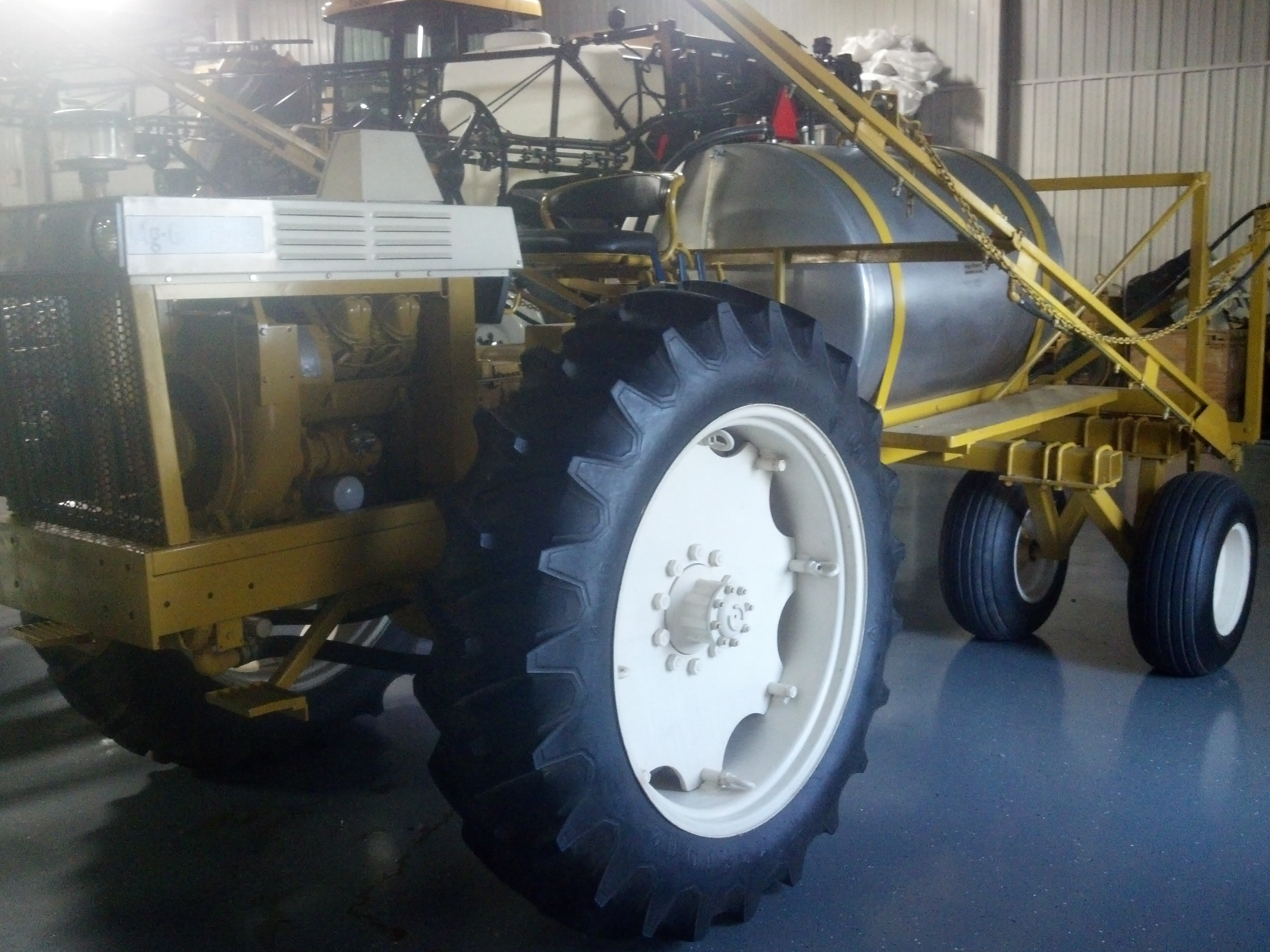
Ag-Gator 404SP

The first self-propelled Ag-Chem sprayer was developed in 1967 and was called the Ag-Gator 404SP. This front wheel driven model featured a gasoline-powered, 61 horsepower Wisconsin brand engine, a stainless-steel 440 gallon product tank, and a 40' boom width. It was mass-produced between 1969 and 1971.

Model	Engine Type	Engine HP	Transmission MFG	Transmission Type	Transmission # of Gears	Axle MFG	Axle Type	Application System Type	Years Produced
Ag-Gator 404SP	Wisconsin Brand (Gas) 154in^{3}	61 hp	Borg-Warner	Synchromesh	4 Speed	Rockwell	Std. H-140	Liquid	1969–1971
Ag-Gator 504SP	Wisconsin Brand (Gas) 154in^{3}	61 hp	Borg-Warner	Synchromesh	4 Speed	Rockwell	Std. H-140	Liquid	1970–1975
Ag-Gator 754	Ford (Gas) 204in^{3}	Unknown	Borg-Warner	Synchromesh	4 Speed	Rockwell	Std. H-140	Liquid	1972–1976

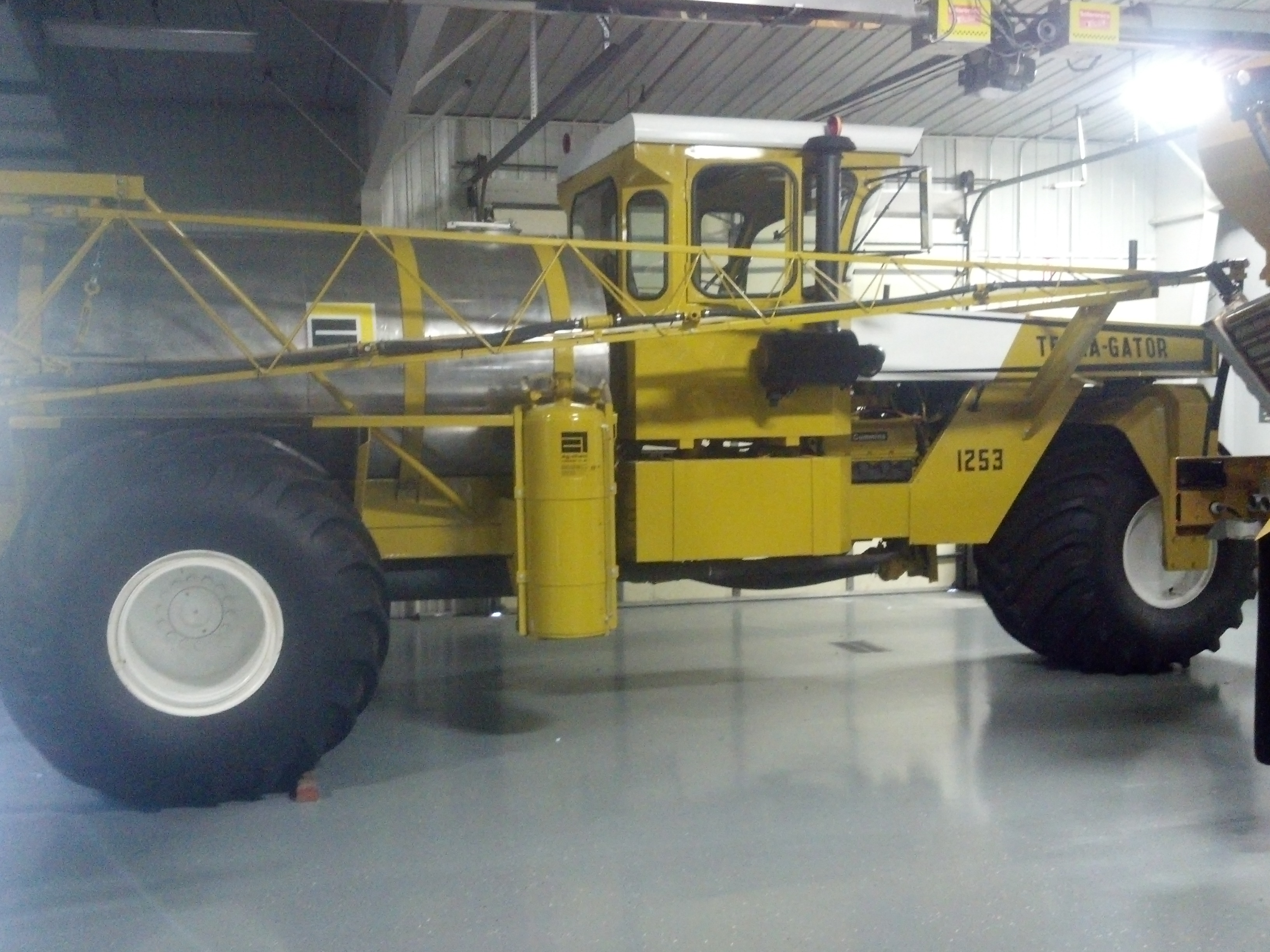
TerraGator 1253

=== TerraGator ===
The first flotation-type applicator produced by Ag-Chem was the Ag-Gator 804. This model was also the first design to allow the operator to apply either a liquid or a dry product. This model featured front-wheel drive and an optional 150 HP gasoline-powered or 155 HP diesel power plant.

Beginning with the 1253, Ag-Chem elected to change the model name from Ag-Gator to TerraGator, which is still in use today. In all models succeeding the 1253, the last digit represents the number of wheels on the chassis.

TerraGator Model	Engine Type	Engine HP	Transmission MFG	Transmission Type	Transmission # of Gears	Axle MFG	Axle Type	Application System Types	Year(s) Produced
Ag-Gator 804	Ford (Gas) 330in^{3} OR Cummins (Diesel) 348in^{3}	155 hp (Gas) 155 hp (Diesel)	Borg-Warner	Synchromesh	4 Speed	Eaton	2-Speed 16221 or 17221	Liquid or Dry Spinner	1973–1976
1253	IHC V8	Unknown	Fuller (Manual)	RT-610 or RTO-610	4 Speed	John Deere	AN52	1250 or 1500 US Gallon Liquid or Dry Spinner	1973–1979
1253	Cummins (Diesel) V504 or V555	195 or 210 hp	Allison (Automatic)	MT643	4 Speed	John Deere	AN52	1250 or 1500 US Gallon Liquid or Dry Spinner	1973–1979
1253	Caterpillar 3160 (Diesel)	210 hp	Spicer (Automatic)	7041	4 Speed with #4 locked out (3 Speed config.)	John Deere	AN52	1250 or 1500 US Gallon Liquid or Dry Spinner	1973–1979
1253	Caterpillar 3208 (Diesel)	210 hp	Allison (Auxiliary)	MT643	4 Speed	John Deere	AN52	1250 or 1500 US Gallon Liquid or Dry Spinner	1973–1979
2505	Cummins V903 (Diesel)	350 hp	Spicer or Fuller	SST-10 or RT-910, RT-1110, RT-11610	4 Speed	Rockwell	Outboard Planetary reduction, lockable inter-axle	2800 gal liquid, Anhydrous ammonia, or 4000 gal PV sludge	1976–1989
2505	Cummins L10 (Diesel	350 hp	Fuller	RTO-15618, RTLO-14618A w/o RPTO, RTLO-14618B w/ RPTO	4 Speed	Rockwell	Outboard Planetary reduction, lockable inter-axle	2800 gal liquid, Anhydrous ammonia, or 4000 gal PV sludge	1990–1994
2505	Detroit V8-92TA (Diesel)	420 hp	Fuller	RTO-15618, RTLO-14618B	4 Speed with #4 locked out (3 Speed config.)	Rockwell	Outboard Planetary reduction, lockable inter-axle	2800 gal liquid, Anhydrous ammonia, or 4000 gal PV sludge	1995
2505	Caterpillar 3176 (Diesel)	400 hp	Fuller	RTLO-14618B	4 Speed	Rockwell	Outboard Planetary reduction, lockable inter-axle	2800 gal liquid, Anhydrous ammonia, or 4000 gal PV sludge	1996–1999
1004	Cummins V378-C155 V6 (Diesel)	140 hp	Fuller (Manual) Allison (Automatic)	RT-610, RT-6610 (Fuller) or MT643 (Allison)	4 Speed with #4 locked out (3 Speed config.)	John Deere	AN22	Liquid, Dry Spinner, Liquid Manure Applicator, Dry Manure Spreader	1976–1987
1004	Cummins V504 V8 (Diesel)	190 hp	Fuller (Manual) Allison (Automatic)	RT-610, RT-6610 (Fuller) or MT643 (Allison)	4 Speed	John Deere	AN22	Liquid, Dry Spinner, Liquid Manure Applicator, Dry Manure Spreader	1976–1987
1603	Cummins V555 Natural or Turbo (Diesel)	215 or 250 hp	Fuller (Manual), Allison (Auto), Spicer (Auto), Allison (Auxiliary)	RTO-610 or RTO-6610 (Fuller), MT643 (Allison), 7041 (Spicer), MT643 (Allison Aux.)	4 speed except for Spicer which had 4th locked out (3 speed config.)	John Deere	AN53 Low Speed (Fuller), AN53 High Speed (Allison), Team Mate II (Spicer) Team Mate II AB (Allison Aux.)	Liquid, Dry Spinner, Mechanical Dry, Pneumatic Dry	1979–1985
3004	Cummins V555 or V903 (Diesel)	230 hp or 290 hp	Fuller (Manual) or Allison (Automatic)	RT-6610 (Fuller) or MT654R (Allison)	4 Speed	Rockwell	T-226-F	Industrial Applications	1980–1985
2004	Cummins 6BTA 5.9L (Diesel)	190 hp	Fuller (Manual) Allison (Automatic)	RT-610, RT-6610 (Fuller) or MT643 (Allison)	4 Speed	John Deere	AN22	Liquid, Dry Spinner, Liquid Manure Applicator, Dry Manure Spreader	1981–1992
004	Cummins V504 (Diesel)	180 hp	Funk	2000 Powershift	6 FWD and 3 REV Speeds	John Deere	AN22	Liquid, Dry Spinner, Liquid Manure Applicator, Dry Manure Spreader	1984–1998
004	Cummins 6CTA 8.3L (Diesel)	250 hp	Fuller	RT-6610 w/ Columbia Transfer case	4 Speed with #4 locked out (3 Speed config.)	John Deere	AN22	Liquid, Dry Spinner, Liquid Manure Applicator, Dry Manure Spreader	1984–1998
1664	Cummins V555 Big Cam, Turbocharged (Diesel)	250 hp	Fuller (Manual) or Allison (Auto)	RTO-6610, 2-A-92 series (Fuller), MT643, or MT643 Auto (Allison)	4 Speed	Eaton (Front) and Rockwell (Rear)	Tubular Beam, Outboard Planetary	1550 gal liquid, Dry spinner, Mechanical boom, Pneumatic boom, industrial systems	1984–1985
1664T	Caterpillar 3208 (Diesel)	250 hp	Fuller (Manual) or Allison (Auto)	RTO-6610, 2-A-92 series (Fuller), MT643, or MT643 Auto (Allison)	4 Speed	Eaton (Front) and Rockwell (Rear)	Tubular Beam, Outboard Planetary	1550 gal liquid, Dry spinner, Mechanical boom, Pneumatic boom, industrial systems	1986–1992
1603T	Caterpillar 3208 Natural or Turbo (Diesel)	210 or 250 hp	Fuller (Manual), Allison (Auto), Spicer (Auto), Allison (Auxiliary)	RTO-610 or RTO-6610 (Fuller), MT643 (Allison), 7041 (Spicer), MT643 (Allison Aux.)	4 speed except for Spicer which had 4th locked out (3 speed config.)	John Deere	AN53 Low Speed (Fuller), AN53 High Speed (Allison), Team Mate II (Spicer) Team Mate II AB (Allison Aux.)	Liquid, Dry Spinner, Mechanical Dry, Pneumatic Dry	1986–1999
1803	Cummins 6CTA, Caterpillar 3208, or John Deere 6081 (Diesel)	275/300 hp (Cummins), 275/295/300 hp (CAT), 300 hp (JD)	Fuller (Manual or Torq-Boost), Allison (Auto), Spicer (Manual), or Funk (TerraShift)	RTLO-14618A or RTLO-9118 AMT (Fuller), MT643 or World MD-3060P (Allison), 7041 4 speed or 7041 3 speed (Spicer), Funk Powershift	4 Speed (Fuller, Allison, and Spicer) 3 Speed (Spicer #2), 11 Speed (Funk)	John Deere	AN53 Low Speed (Fuller), AN53 High Speed (Allison), Team Mate II (Spicer) Team Mate II AB (Funk)	1550 gal or 1800 gal Liquid, Dry Spinner, Pneumatic Dry	1989–1997
1703	Cummins 6CTA (Diesel)	250 hp	Fuller (Manual) or Allison (Auto or Manual)	7041 (Fuller), or MT 643 (Allison), or MT 643 Auto (Allison)	4 Speed	John Deere	AN53 High Speed, Team Mate II or Team Mate II AB	1550 gal or 1800 gal Liquid, Dry Spinner	1990–1996
1804	Cummins 6CTA (Diesel)	270 hp	Fuller (Manual), Spicer (Manual), or Allison (Manual or Auto)	7041 (Fuller), or RTO-15619 (Spicer) or MT 643 (Allison), or MT 643 Auto (Allison)	4 Speed	Eaton (Front) and Rockwell (Rear)	Tubular Beam, Outboard Planetary	1550 or 1800 gal. Liquid, Dry spinner, Mechanical boom, Pneumatic boom, Waste 2000 gal P.V., or Dry Manure Spreader	1990–1993
1903	Cummins L10 (Diesel)	250 hp	Fuller (Manual)	Torq-Boost	18 Speed	Rockwell	Outboard Planetary	2000 gal liquid, Dry Spinner, Pneumatic Dry	1991–1994
1903	Caterpillar 3176 (Diesel)	400 hp	Fuller (Manual)	Torq-Boost	18 Speed	Rockwell	Outboard Planetary	2000 gal liquid, Dry Spinner, Pneumatic Dry	1995–1999
2204	Cummins 6CTA (Diesel)	240 hp	Fuller (Manual)	RT-6610	4 Speed	John Deere	Team Mate II 1200 Series	Liquid Slurry w/ Toolbar, Dry Manure Spreader, Industrial Systems	1992–1997
1844	Cummins 6CTA Natural or Turbo, John Deere 6081, Caterpillar 3208 (Diesel)	275/300 hp (Cummins), 300 hp (JD), 275/295/300 hp (CAT)	Fuller, Allison, Funk, or Spicer	RTLO-14618A or RTLO-9118 AMT (Fuller), MT643 or World MD-3060P (Allison), TerraShift (Funk), 7041 4 speed or World MD-3060P (Spicer)	Multiple Speeds	Eaton (Front) and Rockwell (Rear)	Tubular Beam, Outboard Planetary	Liquid, Dry Spinner, Pneumatic Dry	1993–1998
8103	John Deere 6081H 8.1L (Diesel)	300 hp	Funk (Power Shift)	TerraShift	11 Speed	John Deere	Team Mate II AB	1800 gal Liquid, Dry Spinner, Pneumatic Dry	1998–2006
3104	John Deere 6081H 8.1L (Diesel)	300 hp	Funk (Power Shift)	TerraShift	11 Speed	John Deere	Team Mate II AB 1400 Series	3400-gallon NMS, 3100-gallon PV, Side-discharge manure spreader	1998–2007
8104	John Deere 6081H 8.1L (Diesel)	30 hp	Funk (Power Shift)	TerraShift	11 Speed	Eaton (Front) and Rockwell (Rear)	Tubular Beam, Outboard Planetary	1800 gal Liquid, Dry Spinner, Pneumatic Dry	1999–2006
8144	John Deere 6081H 8.1L (Diesel)	300 hp	Funk (Power Shift)	TerraShift	11 Speed	Fabco (Front) and Rockwell (Rear)	Steerable-double reduction, Outboard Planetary	1800 gal Liquid, Dry Spinner, Pneumatic Dry	1999–2006
6103	John Deere 6081H 8.1L (Diesel)	270 hp	Funk (Power Shift)	TerraShift	11 Speed	John Deere	Team Mate II AB	1800 gal Liquid, Dry Spinner	2000–2006
9103	Cat 3176C 10.3L (Diesel)	400 hp	Fuller (Power Shift w/ Torque Converter)	RTLO-14618A	18 Speed	Rockwell	Outboard Planetary	2400 gal Liquid, Dry Spinner, Pneumatic Dry	2000–2006
9105	Cat 3176C 10.3L (Diesel)	400 hp	Fuller (Power Shift w/ Torque Converter)	RTLO-14618B (Road Ranger)	18 Speed	Rockwell	Outboard Planetary	2400 gal Liquid, Dry Spinner, Pneumatic Dry	2000–2006
4104	John Deere 6081H 8.1L (Diesel)	300 hp	Funk (Power Shift)	TerraShift	11 Speed	John Deere	Team Mate II 1400 Series Sweda	3400-gallon NMS, 3100-gallon PV, Side-discharge manure spreader	2001–2006
6203	Caterpillar C-9 (Diesel)	310 hp	Funk (Power Shift)	TerraShift	11 Speed	AxleTech	PRC 2715, ratio 16.65:1	1800 gal Liquid, Dry Spinner, AirMax Pneumatic Dry	2007–2010
8203	Caterpillar C-9 (Diesel)	330 hp	Funk (Power Shift)	TerraShift	11 Speed	AxleTech	PRC 2715, ratio 16.65:1	1800 gal Liquid, Dry Spinner, AirMax Pneumatic Dry, Air Spreader Single Bin, Air Spreader Twin Bin	2007–2010
8204	Caterpillar C-9 (Diesel)	330 hp	Funk (Power Shift)	TerraShift	11 Speed	Eaton (Front) and AxleTech (Rear)	Tubular Beam, PRC 2715, ratio 14.04:1 or 15.6:1	1800 gal Liquid, Dry Spinner, AirMax Pneumatic Dry, Air Spreader Single Bin, Air Spreader Twin Bin	2007–2011
8244	Caterpillar C-9 (Diesel)	330 hp	Funk (Power Shift)	TerraShift	11 Speed	Eaton (Front) and AxleTech (Rear)	Tubular Beam, PRC 2715, ratio 14.04:1 or 15.6:1	1800 gal Liquid, Dry Spinner, AirMax Pneumatic Dry, Air Spreader Single Bin, Air Spreader Twin Bin	2007–2008, 2010–2011
9203	Caterpillar C-13 (Diesel)	420 hp	Caterpillar (Power Shift)	TA-22	16 Speed	AxleTech	PRC 2715, ratio 17.41:1	1800 or 2400 gal Liquid, Dry Spinner, AirMax Precision or Air Max Precision2, Air Spreader Single Bin, Twin Bin, or Four Bin	2007–2011
9205	Caterpillar C-13 (Diesel)	420 hp	Caterpillar (Power Shift)	TA-22	16 Speed	AxleTech	PRC 2715, ratio 17.41:1	1800 or 2400 gal Liquid, Dry Spinner, AirMax Precision or Air Max Precision2, Air Spreader Single Bin, Twin Bin, or Four Bin	2007–2011
3244	Caterpillar C-13 (Diesel)	420 hp	Caterpillar (Power Shift)	TA-22	16 Speed	AxleTech	PRC 2715, ratio 17.41:1	1800 or 2400 gal Liquid, Dry Spinner, AirMax Precision or Air Max Precision2, Air Spreader Single Bin, Twin Bin, or Four Bin	2008–2010
6303	AGCO Sisu Diesel 8.4L	310 hp	AGCO (CVT)	ML-260	Infinite	AxleTech	PRC 2715, ratio 17.55:1	1800 gal Liquid, Dry Spinner, AirMax Pneumatic Dry	2011
8303	AGCO Sisu Diesel 8.4L	330 hp	AGCO (CVT)	ML-260	Infinite	AxleTech	PRC 2715, ratio 17.55:1	1800 gal Liquid, Dry Spinner, AirMax Pneumatic Dry, Air Spreader Single Bin, Air Spreader Twin Bin	2011
8304	AGCO Sisu Diesel 8.4L	330 hp	AGCO (CVT)	ML-260 w/ DropBox	Infinite	AxleTech	PRC 2715, 14.8:1	1800 gal Liquid, Dry Spinner, AirMax Pneumatic Dry, Air Spreader Single Bin, Air Spreader Twin Bin	2011
TG7300	AGCO POWER Tier 4i Diesel 8.4L	330 hp	AGCO (CVT)	ML-260	Infinite	AxleTech	PRC 2715, ratio 17.55:1	1800 gal Liquid, Dry Spinner, AirMax Pneumatic Dry	2012–2016
TG8300	AGCO POWER Tier 4i Diesel 8.4L	360 hp	AGCO (CVT)	ML-260	Infinite	AxleTech	PRC 2715, ratio 17.55:1	1800 gal Liquid, Dry Spinner, AirMax Pneumatic Dry, Air Spreader Single Bin, Air Spreader Twin Bin	2012–2016
TG8400	AGCO POWER Tier 4i Diesel 8.4L	360 hp	AGCO (CVT)	ML-260 w/ DropBox	Infinite	AxleTech	PRC 2715, ratio 14.8:1	1800 gal Liquid, Dry Spinner, AirMax Pneumatic Dry, Air Spreader Single Bin, Air Spreader Twin Bin	2012–2016
TG9300	Caterpillar C-13 Tier 3 (Diesel)	420 hp	Caterpillar (Power Shift)	TA-22	16 Speed	AxleTech	PRC 2715, ratio 17.41:1	1800 or 2400 gal Liquid, Dry Spinner, AirMax Precision or Air Max Precision2, Air Spreader Single Bin, Twin Bin, or Four Bin	2012–2016
TG7300B	AGCO Power Tier 4 Final Diesel 8.4L	332 hp	AGCO (CVT)	ML-260	Infinite	AxleTech	PRC-673, ratio 17.41:1	1800 gal Liquid, Dry Spinner, AirMax Pneumatic Dry, Air Spreader	2017-2020
TG8300B	AGCO Power Tier 4 Final Diesel 8.4L	365 hp	AGCO (CVT)	ML-260	Infinite	AxleTech	PRC-673, ratio 17.41:1	1800 gal Liquid, Dry Spinner, AirMax Precision, AirMax Precision2, Air Spreader Single Bin, Air Spreader Twin Bin	2017-2020
TG8400B	AGCO Power Tier 4 Final Diesel 8.4L	365 hp	AGCO (CVT)	ML-260 w/ DropBox	Infinite	AxleTech	FS25 Front Axle PRC-673, ratio 14.48:1	1800 gal Liquid, Dry Spinner, AirMax Precision, AirMax Precision2, Air Spreader Single Bin, Air Spreader Twin Bin	2017-2020
TG9300B	AGCO Power Tier 4 Final Diesel 9.8L	425 hp	AGCO (CVT)	ML-260	Infinite	AxleTech	PRCL1735, ratio 20.65:1	2400 gal Liquid, Dry Spinner, AirMax Precision, AirMax Precision2, AIr Spreader SIngle Bin, AIr Spreader Twin Bin, AIr Spreader Four Bin	2017-2020
TG7300C	AGCO Power Tier 4 Final Diesel 8.4L	322 hp	AGCO (CVT)	ML-260	Infinite	AxleTech	PRC-673, ratio 17.41:1	1800 gal Liquid, Dry Spinner G4, Dry Spinner G5, AirMax Precision	2021–Present
TG8300C	AGCO Power Tier 4 Final Diesel 8.4L	365 hp	AGCO (CVT)	ML-260	Infinite	AxleTech	PRC-673, ratio 17.41:1	1800 gal Liquid, Dry Spinner G4 and G5, AirMax Precision, AirMax Precision2, Air Spreader Single Bin, Air Spreader Twin Bin	2021–Present
TG8400C	AGCO Power Tier 4 Final Diesel 8.4L	365 hp	AGCO (CVT)	ML-260 w/ DropBox	Infinite	AxleTech	FS25 Front Axle PRC-673, ratio 14.48:1	1800 gal Liquid, Dry Spinner G4 and G5, AirMax Precision, AirMax Precision2, Air Spreader Single Bin, Air Spreader Twin Bin	2021–Present
TG9300C	AGCO Power Tier 4 Final Diesel 9.8L	425 hp	AGCO (CVT)	ML-260	Infinite	Kessler	19.8:1 Ratio	2400 gal Liquid, Dry Spinner G4 and G5, AirMax Precision, AirMax Precision2, AIr Spreader Twin Bin, AIr Spreader Four Bin	2021–Present

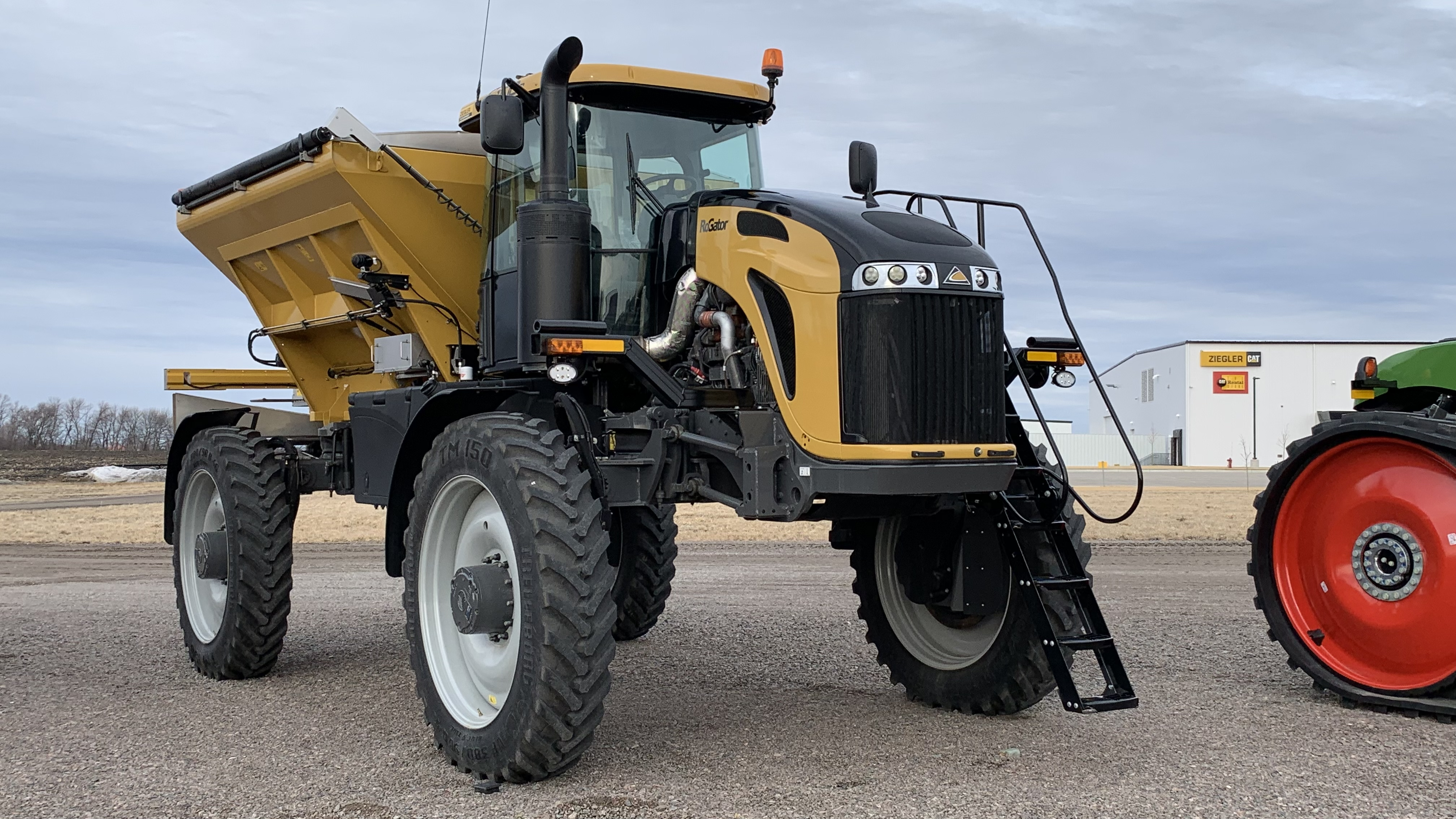
RoGator C Series with Dry Spinner System

=== RoGator ===
In the 1990s, Ag-Chem saw an emerging market for a self-propelled row-crop sprayer. Ag-Chem's answer was the RoGator. The first RoGator was the model 664.

Model	Engine Type	Engine HP	Transmission MFG	Application System Options	Boom Options	Wheel Tread Spacing	Years Produced
RG900	AGCO Power Tier 4i Diesel 8.4L	280 hp	Tandem Sauer Danfoss Hydrostatic	900 Gal / 180AirMax / New Leader	90 ft (27.3m) / 100 ft 30.5m) / 120 ft (36.6m) / 60 ft (18.3) -AirMax	120in-152in (3.05m-3.86m)	2012-2014
RG1100	AGCO Power Tier 4i Diesel 8.4L	310 hp	Tandem Sauer Danfoss Hydrostatic	1100 Gal / 180AirMax / New Leader	90 ft (27.3m) / 100 ft (30.5m) / 120 ft (36.6m) / 60 ft (18.3) -AirMax	120in-152in (3.05m-3.86m)	2012-2014
RG1300	AGCO Power Tier 4i Diesel 8.4L	330 hp	Tandem Bosch Rexroth Hydrostatic	1300 Gal / 180AirMax / New Leader	90 ft (27.3m) / 100 ft (30.5m) / 120 ft (36.6m) / 60 ft (18.3) -AirMax	120in-152in (3.05m-3.86m)	2012-2014
RG900B	AGCO Power TIer 4F Diesel 7.4L	280 hp	Tandem Sauer Danfoss Hydrostatic	900 Gal Liquid / 258 ft^{3} New Leader Dry Spinner	90 ft (27.3m) / 100 ft (30.5m) / 120 ft (36.6m)	120in-152in (3.05m-3.86m)	2015-2017
RG1100B	AGCO Power Tier 4F Diesel 8.4L	311 hp	Tandem Sauer Danfoss Hydrostatic	1100 Gal Liquid / 258 ft^{3} New Leader Dry Spinner	90 ft (27.3m) / 100 ft (30.5m) / 120 ft (36.6m)	120in-152in (3.05m-3.86m)	2015-2017
RG1300B	AGCO Power Tier 4F Diesel 8.4L	339 hp	Tandem Bosch Rexroth Hydrostatic	1300 Gal Liquid / 258 ft^{3} or 299 ft^{3} New Leader Dry Spinner / 180 AirMax	90 ft (27.3m) / 100 ft (30.5m) / 120 ft (36.6m) / 60 ft (18.3) -AirMax	120in-152in (3.05m-3.86m)	2015-2017
RG900C	AGCO Power TIer 4F Diesel 7.4L	280 hp	Single Danfoss Hydrostatic SmartDrive	900 Gal Liquid / 258 ft^{3} New Leader Dry Spinner	90 ft (27.3m) / 100 ft (30.5m) / 120 ft (36.6m) / 132 ft Aluminum (40.6m)	120in-152in (3.05m-3.86m)	2017–2022
RG1100C	AGCO Power Tier 4F Diesel 8.4L	315 hp	Single Danfoss Hydrostatic SmartDrive	1100 Gal Liquid / 258 ft^{3} New Leader Dry Spinner / AirMax Precision R1 or R2	90 ft (27.3m) / 100 ft (30.5m) / 120 ft (36.6m) / 132 ft Aluminum (40.6m) / 70 ft AirMax (21.5m)	120in-152in (3.05m-3.86m)	2017–2022
RG1300C	AGCO Power Tier 4F Diesel 8.4L	339 hp	Single Danfoss Hydrostatic SmartDrive	1300 Gal Liquid / 258 ft^{3} or 299 ft^{3} New Leader Dry Spinner / AirMax Precision R1 or R2	90 ft (27.3m) / 100 ft (30.5m) / 120 ft (36.6m) / 132 ft Aluminum (40.6m) / 70 ft AirMax (21.5m)	120in-152in (3.05m-3.86m)	2017–2022

== See also ==
- AGCO
- Sprayer
- Pesticide application
