= Silwood Park =

Rural campus of Imperial College London, United Kingdom

Coordinates: 51.4086°N 0.6410°W

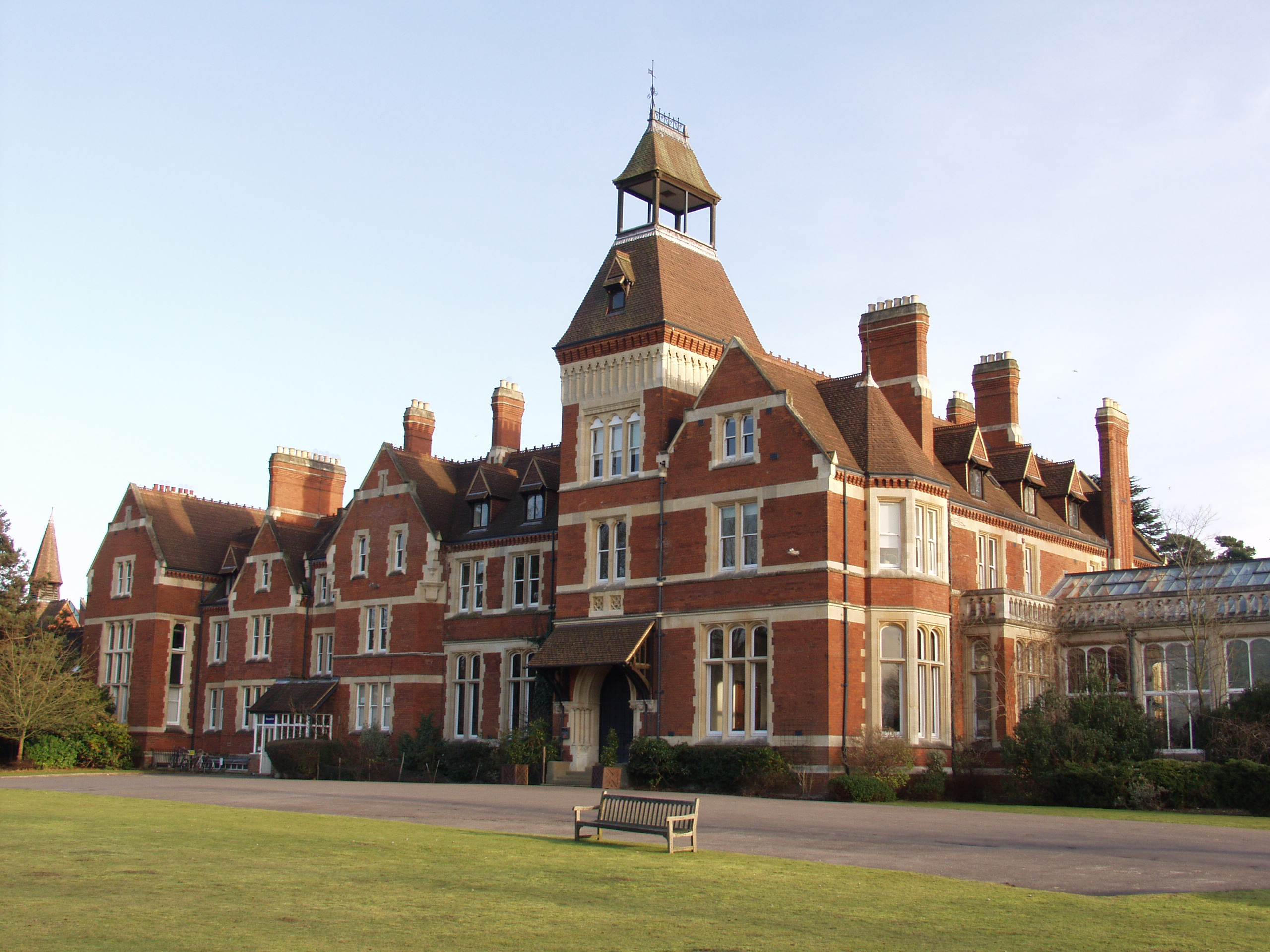
Silwood Manor dates from before Silwood Park became part of Imperial College

Silwood Park is the rural campus of Imperial College London, England. It is situated near the village of Sunninghill, near Ascot in Berkshire. Since 1986, there have been major developments on the site with four new college buildings. Adjacent to these buildings is the Technology Transfer Centre: a science park with units leased to commercial companies for research.

There are a number of the divisions of Faculty of Natural Sciences that have a presence on the campus. Additionally, Silwood Park is home to the NERC Centre for Population Biology (CPB), the International Pesticide Application Research Consortium (IPARC).

== History ==
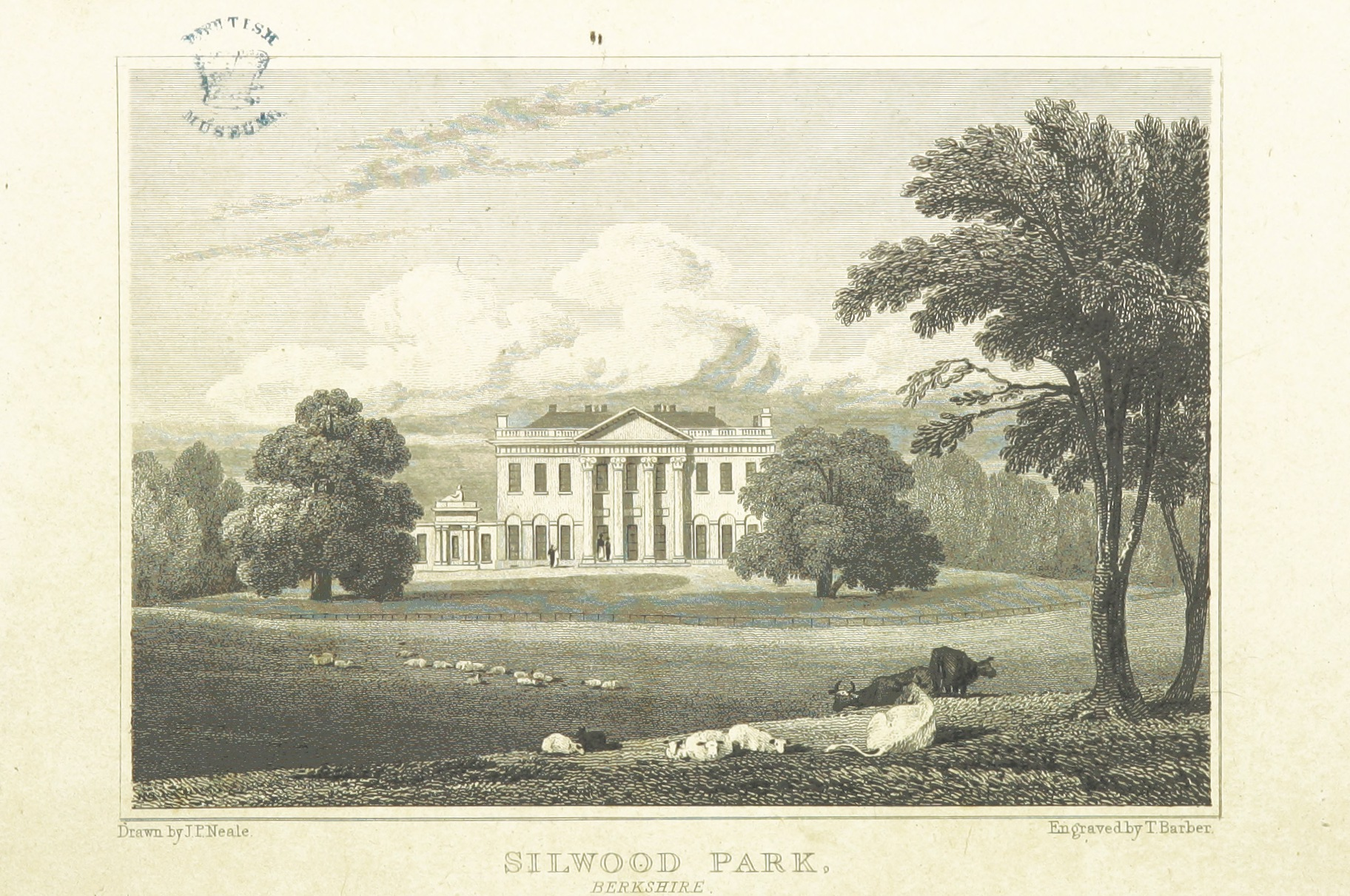
Silwood Park, engraving from a drawing by John Preston Neale, 1818.

Prior to World War II, Silwood Park was a private residence—the manor house of Sunninghill—then during the war, it became a convalescent home for airmen. The original manor at which Prince Arthur stayed in 1499 was known as Eastmore and was situated on the hill near Silwood Farm. In about 1788, Sir James Sibbald built a neo-classical Georgian mansion by architect Robert Mitchell (1770–1809) on part of the present house and demolished the old "Eastmore"; he called it Selwood or Silwood Park. The name stems from the Old English for Sallow (Salix caprea Agg.) which presumably grew then along the banks of the streams that flow through the Park. The grounds were landscaped by Humphry Repton, most celebrated landscape designer of his generation.

In 1854 Silwood was bought by Lancashire cotton mill owner John Hargreaves Jr from the widow of Mr Forbes and Silwood Lodge added thereafter. Mary Hargreaves (née Hick) received socialite Rose O'Neale Greenhow as a guest in April 1864 and was an associate of novelist Mrs Oliphant. John Hargreaves died in 1874 and his trustees, one of whom was John Hick, sold the estate to engineer Charles Patrick Stewart in 1875. Silwood Park and Silwood Lodge were demolished in 1876 and the present mansion commissioned by Stewart to the design of Alfred Waterhouse, completed in 1878. Stewart was keen on horse racing and partying, and built his new house around a grand ballroom where, on race days and holidays he would entertain the sons of Queen Victoria amongst other racing enthusiasts. Architectural historian Nikolaus Pevsner described the new manor house as "Red brick and huge. Free Tudor with a freer tower". Waterhouse's use of Silwood-style bricks for new university buildings at Manchester and London gave rise to the phrase red-brick universities.

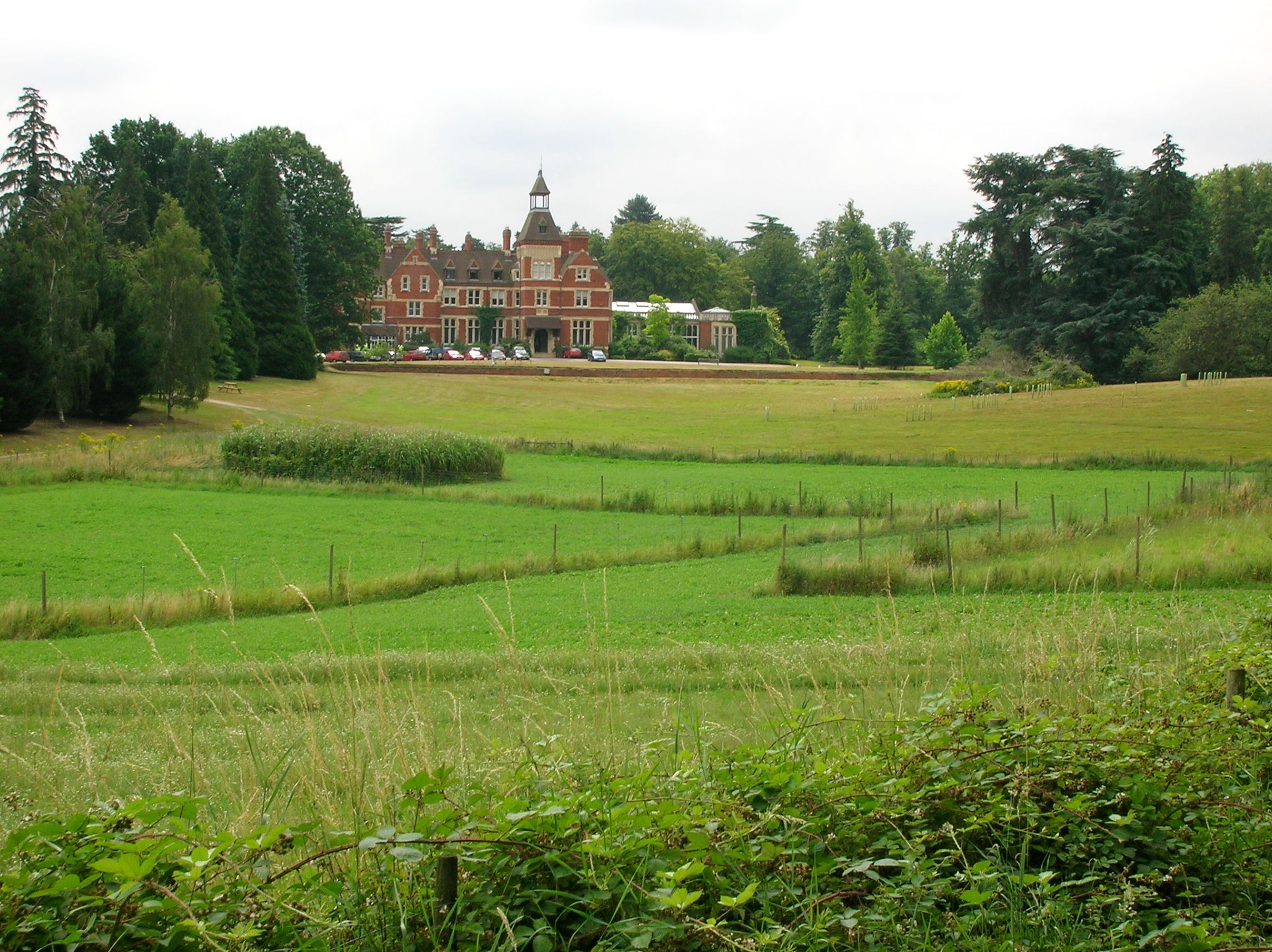
Silwood Park open land from the south east

In 1947, Silwood Park was purchased by Imperial College for entomological research and field studies. Initially, pioneering developments in insect pest management took place, but more recently the emphasis has been on ecology and evolutionary biology. Staff and research students of the Zoology Department were the first college personnel at Silwood when the Field Station moved from Slough, but the department of Civil Engineering has used it since 1947 for courses in surveying. Botany and Meteorology started work there about thirty years ago and the nuclear reactor was opened in 1965. Over a thousand postgraduate students have been trained at Silwood since its establishment, about half of them taking PhDs. They have come from more than sixty countries, and Silwood-trained graduates have gone to almost every corner of the globe. There are over 200 graduate staff and students working there at any one time. Undergraduates from South Kensington attend for field courses and some final-year projects. In 1981, the departments of Zoology and Botany were merged to form the Department of Biology.

A low power nuclear research reactor (100 kW thermal), named CONSORT II, was licensed at the site on 20 December 1962, completed February 1963, and achieved first criticality in 1965. After a decline in research conducted there, the reactor was shut down in 2012 and defueled by 2014. The reactor was decommissioned in 2021, followed by the demolition of the reactor building.

In 1984, the CAB International Institute of Biological Control (IIBC) moved its headquarters to Silwood Park. From 1989 to 2008, the Institute occupied its own new building at Silwood Park, which also housed the Michael Way Library, specialising in ecology, entomology and crop protection. From January 1998, IIBC and its sister Institutes of Entomology, Mycology and Parasitology were integrated on two sites as CABI Bioscience. The Silwood site was the centre for the LUBILOSA Programme, where an inter-disciplinary team could be set up, combining IIBCs biological control skills with (bio)pesticide application (IPARC) and host-pathogen ecology (CPB). CABI continued to focus on biological pest, disease and weed management in Silwood Park until consolidation at Egham (to become the UK Centre) in 2008. The celebrated Entomology Masters in Science (Msc) course was suspended in 2012, causing faculty to move their work to Harper Adams University.

== See also ==
- LUBILOSA
- Richard Southwood
