= AGCO =

American agricultural machinery manufacturer

AGCO Corporation
- Formerly: Gleaner-Allis Corporation; Allis-Gleaner Corporation
- Type: Public
- Traded as: NYSE: AGCO; S&P 400 component
- Industry: Agricultural machinery
- Predecessor: Allis-Chalmers (1909–1985); Deutz-Allis (1985–1990)
- Founded: 1990; 36 years ago
- Headquarters: Duluth, Georgia, U.S.
- Area served: Worldwide
- Key people: Eric Hansotia; (chairman, president, CEO); Damon Audia; (senior vice president, CFO)
- Products: Tractors, Combines, Hay tools, Foragers, Seeding & Tillage equipment, Self-propelled sprayers, Smart Farming Technology, Diesel engines and generators
- Brands: Challenger, Fendt, Gleaner, GSI, Massey Ferguson, RoGator, TerraGator, Sunflower Manufacturing, Valtra, White Farm Equipment, JCA Technologies
- Services: Parts, service, finance
- Revenue: ▲US$14.41 billion (2023)
- Net income: ▲US$1.17 billion (2023)
- Total assets: ▲US$11.42 billion (2023)
- Total equity: ▲US$4.66 billion (2023)
- Number of employees: 27,900 (2023)
- Website: agcocorp.com

AGCO Corporation is an American agricultural machinery manufacturer headquartered in Duluth, Georgia, United States. It was founded in 1990. AGCO designs, produces and sells tractors, combines, foragers, hay tools, self-propelled sprayers, smart farming technologies, seeding equipment, and tillage equipment.

== History ==
=== 1990–1996: Founding and early years ===
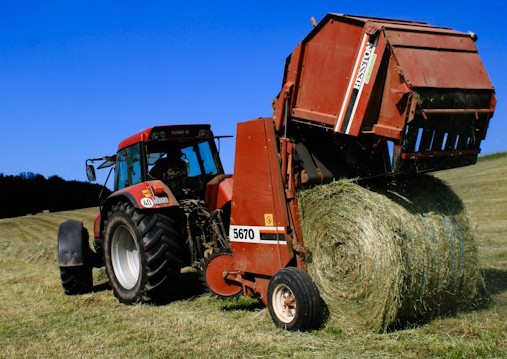
Hesston 5670 round baler, in 2010

AGCO was established on June 20, 1990, when Robert J. Ratliff, John M. Shumejda, Edward R. Swingle, and James M. Seaver, who were executives at Deutz-Allis, bought out Deutz-Allis North American operations from the parent corporation Klöckner-Humboldt-Deutz AG (KHD), a German company which owned the Deutz-Fahr brand of agriculture equipment. KHD had purchased portions of the Allis-Chalmers agricultural equipment business five years earlier. After the organization of the company, Robert Ratliff was selected to be the company's first chairman.

The company was called Gleaner-Allis Corporation, then the name was changed to Allis-Gleaner Corporation, or AGCO. The Deutz-Allis line of tractors was renamed AGCO-Allis, and Gleaner became a brand of its own for combines. The Deutz-Allis brand continued in South America until 2001, when it was renamed AGCO-Allis. In 2001, AGCO Allis was renamed AGCO in North America.

In March 1991, AGCO purchased the Hesston Corporation, which is in Hesston, Kansas, gaining hay and forage equipment as well as technologies such as the grain auger, invented in 1947 by Lyle Yost. Hesston had a 50 percent joint venture with Case International, now a part of CNH Global. AGCO purchased the White Tractor line from the Allied Corporation's White-New Idea company. In 1993, AGCO purchased the remainder of White-New Idea, a manufacturer of New Idea hay equipment, manure spreaders, and White planters with a large manufacturing plant in Coldwater, Ohio.

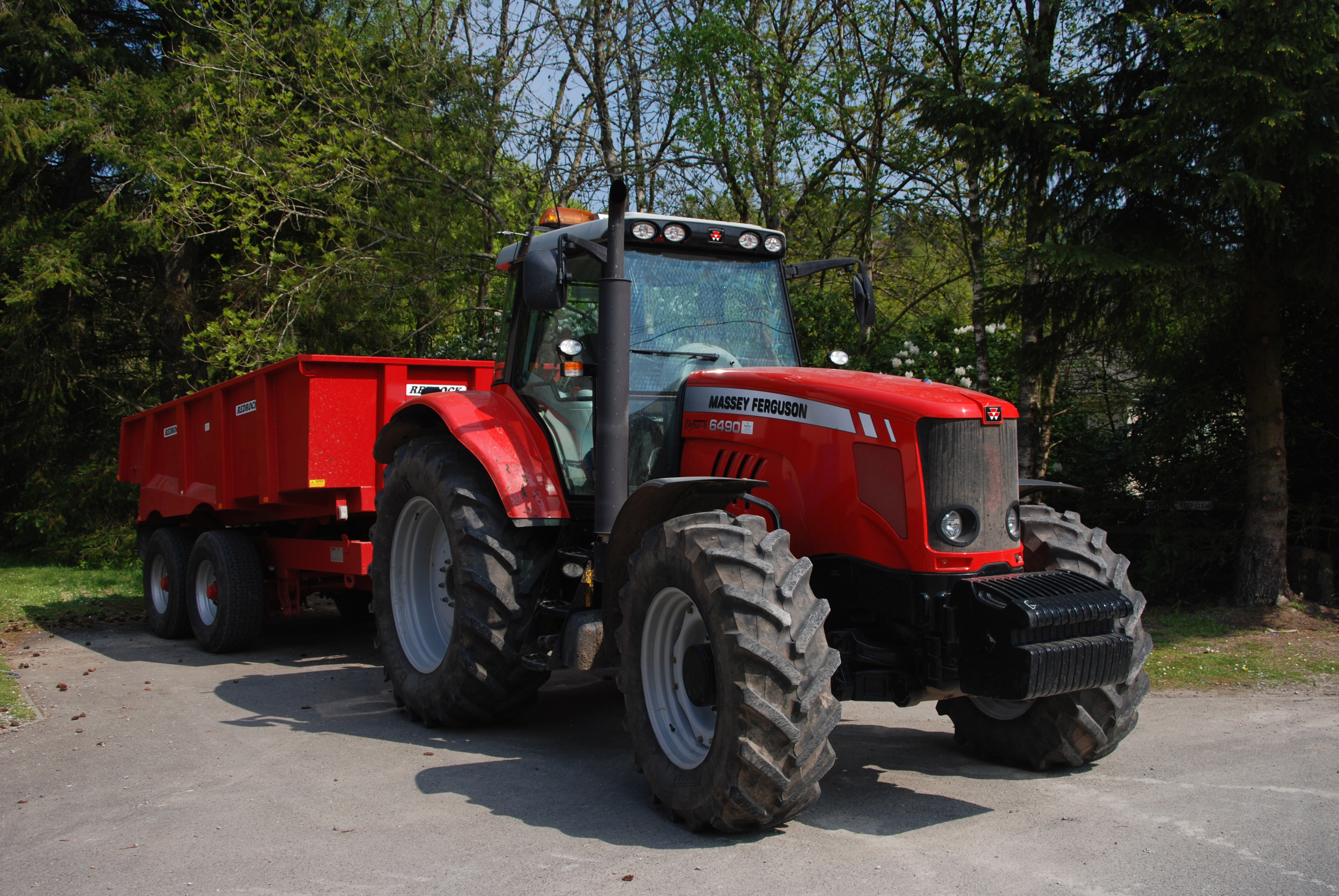
Massey Ferguson 6490 tractor, in 2008

AGCO purchased the North American distribution rights to global agricultural equipment manufacturer Massey Ferguson in 1993 and purchased the company from Varity the following year. The acquisition of England-based Massey Ferguson gave AGCO access to markets in Europe and around the world. At the time, Massey Ferguson had 20 percent of the global market share for tractors. AGCO also purchased McConnell Tractors in 1994, manufacturer of the large articulated Massey Ferguson tractors. AGCO developed the Agcostar line of articulated tractors. Later in 1994, the Black Machine line of planters was purchased.

In 1995 AgEquipment Group was bought; it manufactured tillage equipment and loaders under the Glenco, Tye and Farmhand brands. In 1996, acquisitions went international with the purchase of Iochpe-Maxion in Brazil. It was the Brazilian company which had rights to the Massey Ferguson brand and manufacturing in the region, as well as the Maxion brand of industrial equipment. In the same year AGCO purchased Deutz Argentina, the number one leader of tractors in Argentina. Also in 1996, AGCO purchased Western Combine Corporation and Portage Manufacturing in Canada. Western Combine had previously purchased the assets of the Massey Combine Corporation's combine operation, which had been spun off by Massey Ferguson.

=== 1997–2005: Major acquisitions and growth ===
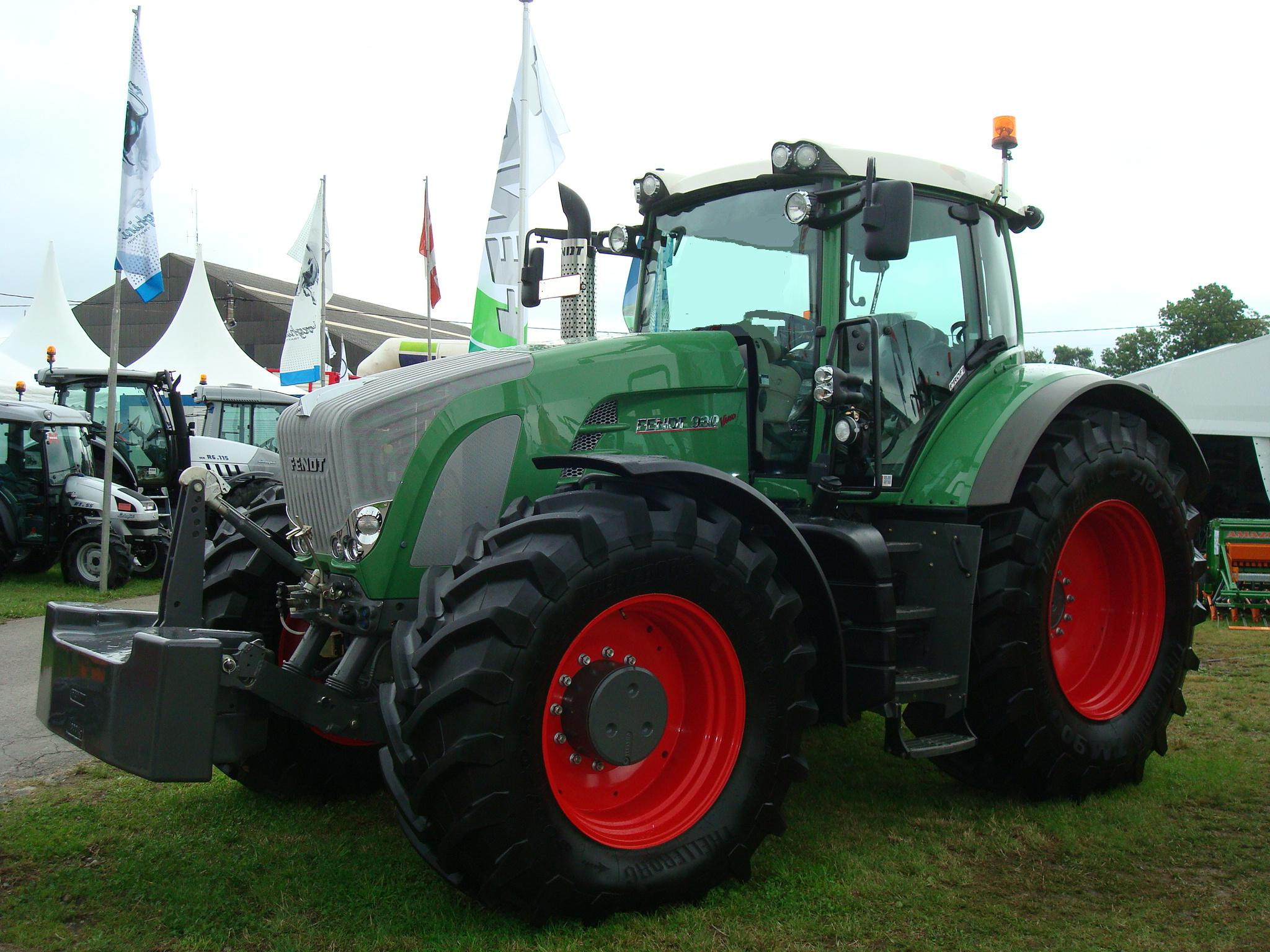
Fendt 930 Vario tractor, in 2009

In 1997 the company purchased Fendt which is based in Germany, the German tractor company. The acquisition of Fendt was contingent on three conditions; 1) The Fendt name would be retained, 2) The factory in Marktoberdorf would continue to operate, and 3) a fair price would be paid for the company. Also in 1997, AGCO acquired Dronningborg Industries in Denmark, the manufacturer of European Massey Ferguson combines, and former manufacturer of Dronningborg combines.

In 1998, AGCO made a joint venture with Deutz AG to produce engines in Argentina, and purchased the Spra-Coupe and Willmar companies. Spra-Coupe and Willmar are sprayer companies in North America. SpraCoupe originated in Bismarck, North Dakota. After being purchased by AGCO, the manufacturing of SpraCoupes was moved to Willmar, Minnesota where the Willmar branded fertilizer tenders and "Wrangler" articulated loaders were being manufactured. SpraCoupe and Willmar products were manufactured in Willmar from 1998 to 2001.

In the year 2000, AGCO bought out its partner CNH Global N.V. in the Hay and Forage Industries joint venture.

In 2001, AGCO purchased Ag-Chem Equipment, expanding its application equipment business. Ag-Chem Equipment was based in Jackson, Minnesota, and developed the TerraGator flotation-type and RoGator rowcrop-type applicators. Also in 2001, the SpraCoupe and Willmar brands moved their manufacturing from Willmar, Minnesota, to the Jackson facility and the Agco-Allis and White tractor lines were merged in North America under the AGCO brand, continuing in the orange color.

In 2002, AGCO purchased rights to the Challenger name and the tracked tractors from the Caterpillar Corporation, giving the firm a well-known brand name and high-power tracked tractors. The firm further developed the Challenger line into: wheeled tractors, using tractors manufactured by Iseki, Agritalia, the Massey Ferguson factory and the Brazilian Valtra factory; combines, rebranding some Massey Ferguson/Gleaner-built combines; and hay equipment, using Hesston-built hay equipment. AGCO also purchased the Sunflower Manufacturing Company in Beloit, Kansas, which manufactures tillage, seeding, and specialty harvesting equipment.

In 2004, AGCO purchased the Valtra tractor company from the Kone Group, in Finland. The purchase of Valtra also included SISU Diesel engines.. Before that AGCO hadn't had its own engine factory, instead it used engines from eight different manufacturers.

=== 2006–2020: Martin Richenhagen era ===
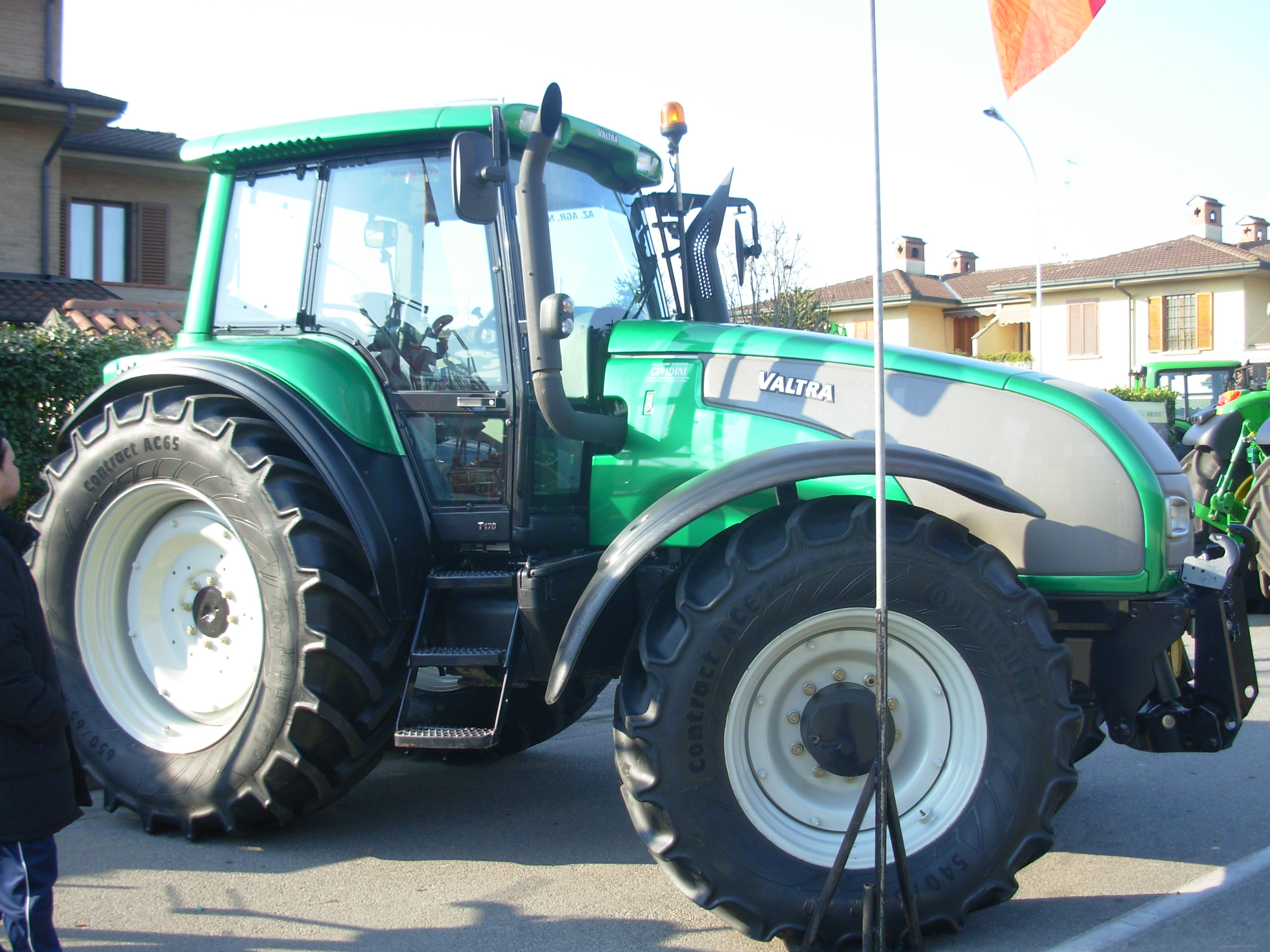
Valtra T170 tractor, in 2008

2006 saw a re-focusing of the various brands and subsidiaries, and the reduction of individual brands. AGCO announced plans to combine some, and make some only part of a larger brand, or co-branding. Examples include the Massey Ferguson 9635 Hesston self-propelled swather, and the AGCO 9365 Hesston self-propelled swather. Challenger has seen further expansion with the further consolidation of the AgChem brand into Challenger, and the introduction of Agritalia built tractors and an articulated Challenger tractor. In August 2006, AGCO saw its first change in the position of chairman since its founding with the selection of Martin Richenhagen to succeed Robert Ratliff.

In 2007, AGCO bought 50% of Laverda S.p.A. from ARGO SpA, which included the Gallagnani and Fella-Werke hay equipment brands.

In 2008/2009 AGCO, the Challenger, Valtra, and Massey Ferguson large row crop tractors were launched in Europe and North America respectively with AGCO's e3 Selective Catalytic Reduction (SCR) emission reduction technology.

Late in 2009, the firm announced that it would phase out orange AGCO tractors by 2011.

In late 2010, the firm announced the plan to acquire the remaining 50% of Laverda, which included Fella-Werke as well. The acquisition was finalized in March 2011.

In 2011, the firm plans to transfer its assembly of high-horsepower wheeled tractors sold in North America from Beauvais, France to Jackson, Minnesota, where it will expand the plant by 75,000 square feet (7,000 m^{2}). The expansion was completed in 2012.

In 2011, the firm said that it will invest $40 million in its Hesston, Kansas plant with a new 200,000-square-foot (19,000 m^{2}) painting and finishing building. Construction began June 2011 and was completed in 2013.

In October 2011, AGCO purchased GSI, based in Assumption, Illinois, a manufacturer of grain storage and handling equipment.

In 2012. AGCO acquired 60% of Santal Equipamentos, a sugar cane planting and harvesting equipment. It also purchased 80% of Shandong Dafeng Machinery Co, a combine harvester manufacturer in China. AGCO formed the Algerian Tractors Company joint venture with the Algerian brand Etrag with 49% ownership.

In 2013, GSI acquired Johnson System, based in Marshall, Michigan, a manufacturer of catwalks and towers. In 2013, AGCO started Fuse Technologies, a smart farming technology division.

In 2016, AGCO acquired Cimbria, based in Thisted, Denmark, a processing, handling and storage of seed and grain business.

In 2017, AGCO acquired Precision Planting, based in Tremont, Illinois, a planting equipment and technology business.

In 2017, AGCO acquired the forage machinery line from Lely, including balers, loading wagons, mowers, tedders, rakes, and the rights to the entire portfolio of the defunct Mengele Agrartechnik. This included factories in Wolfenbuettel (D) and Waldstetten (D). The factory in Maassluis (NL) will be closed in 2018.

In September 2020, AGCO acquired 151 Research Inc., a Winnipeg, Manitoba based company that specializes in grain storage research and development.

=== 2021–present: Eric Hansotia era ===
In 2021, AGCO named Eric Hansotia its third chairman, succeeding Richenhagen, who retired after approximately 15 years as head of the company. Hansotia has been working for AGCO since 2013 and became its chief operating officer in October 2018. Under Hansotia, AGCO made a series of acquisitions in the precision agriculture field, including: Headsight, a Bremen, Indiana-based precision harvesting company, and Farm Robotics and Automation, a Barcelona-based precision livestock agriculture firm in 2021; North Dakota-based Appareo Systems, an agriculture-focused artificial intelligence and mechatronics development firm, and Winnipeg, Manitoba, agriculture automation firm JCA Industries in 2022; the digital assets of German agricultural technology company FarmFacts in 2023; and the purchase of 85 percent of Colorado-based Trimble Inc. for US$2 billion in 2024, the largest acquisition in company history. The Trimble acquisition resulted in PTx Trimble, a joint venture between the companies for autonomizing and retrofitting farm equipment.

In July 2024 AGCO announced it had reached an agreement with private equity firm American Industrial Partners to divest its Grain and Protein divisions including GSI, Automated Production, Tecno, Cimbria, and Cumberland brands.

== Manufacturing Sites ==
Current

Location	Equipment	Notes
Beloit, Kansas, USA	Tillage and seeding tools, planters	previously Sunflower Manufacturing
Hesston, Kansas, USA	Combines & headers, large square balers, Massey Ferguson windrowers	previously Hesston Corporation
Jackson, Minnesota, USA	Tractors (high horsepower and row-crop), application equipment	previously Ag-Chem Equipment
Tremont, Illinois, USA	Precision Planting	
Querétaro, Mexico	small square balers, large round bales, rotary mowers	production moved from Hesston in 2024
Canoas, Rio Grande do Sul, Brazil	Tractors (low to high power), application equipment	
Santa Rosa, Rio Grande do Sul, Brazil	combines, planters	
Changzhou, P.R. China	Tractors (compact and mid-range)	
Linnavuori, Nokia, Finland	Diesel engines	Acquired with purchase of Sisu Diesel (now AGCO Power)
Äänekoski, Finland	Tractors	
Beauvais, France	Tractors (row-crop)	
Asbach-Bäumenheim, Bavaria, Germany	Cab environments	
Feucht, Bavaria, Germany	Hay tools	Acquired with purchase of Fella-Werke
Marktoberdorf, Bavaria, Germany	Tractors (row-crop and high horsepower)	
Waldstetten, Bavaria, Germany	Forage tools	
Wolfenbuttel, Lower Saxony, Germany	Hay tools	
Hohenmolsen, Saxony-Anhalt, Germany	Application equipment and forage harvesters	
Breganze, Italy	Combine harvesters	Acquired with purchase of Laverda
Budapest, Hungary	Shared service center	

Former

- Coldwater, Ohio, USA : White-New Idea farm equipment in 1999.
- Independence, Missouri, USA : Gleaner combines in 2000, production moved to Hesston, Kansas, USA.
- Willmar, Minnesota, USA : Spra-Coupe and Willmar application equipment in 2001.
- Banner Lane, Coventry, UK : Massey Ferguson tractors in 2003.
- Grubbenvorst, Netherlands: Challenger application equipment for European market in 2018
- Maassluis, Netherlands : Lely hay equipment in 2018.
- Biatorbagy, Hungary : Grain Storage and Handling Equipment, closed in 2020

== Brands ==
- AGCO Power
- Challenger
- Fella
- Fendt
- Fuse
- Gleaner
- Laverda
- Massey Ferguson
- PTx Precision Planting
- PTx Trimble
- RoGator / TerraGator
- Sunflower
- Valtra

== See also ==
- List of S&P 400 companies
