= White Farm Equipment =

Discontinued brand of AGCO

- Predecessor: White Motor Corporation
- Founded: 1969 (as a division of White Motor Corporation)
- Defunct: 2021
- Fate: Discontinued
- Products: Tractors and Planters
- Parent: AGCO

White Farm Equipment was a manufacturer of agricultural machinery, now discontinued and owned by AGCO.

== History ==
In 1960, the White Motor Corporation entered the agriculture market with the purchase of the Oliver Farm Equipment Company. In 1962, White acquired the Cockshutt Farm Equipment Company of Canada. White increased its agricultural interests in 1963 with the acquisition of Minneapolis-Moline.

In 1969, Oliver, Minneapolis-Moline and Cockshutt were merged to form White Farm Equipment with headquarters in Oak Brook, Illinois; White Motor Corporation's headquarters remained in Cleveland, Ohio. In 1975, Oliver, Minneapolis-Moline and Cockshutt were folded into the White brand. The green of Oliver, red of Cockshutt and yellow of Minneapolis-Moline tractors was replaced by the silver tractors of White's Field Boss line. The Field Boss models in approximate order of introduction are as follows: 4-150 (The 4 indicates four wheel drive and the 150 is the power take-off horsepower) 2-105, 2-150 4-180, 2-50, 2-60, 2-70, 2-85, 2-135, 2-155, 2-180, 4-210, 4-180, 4-270, and 4-325.

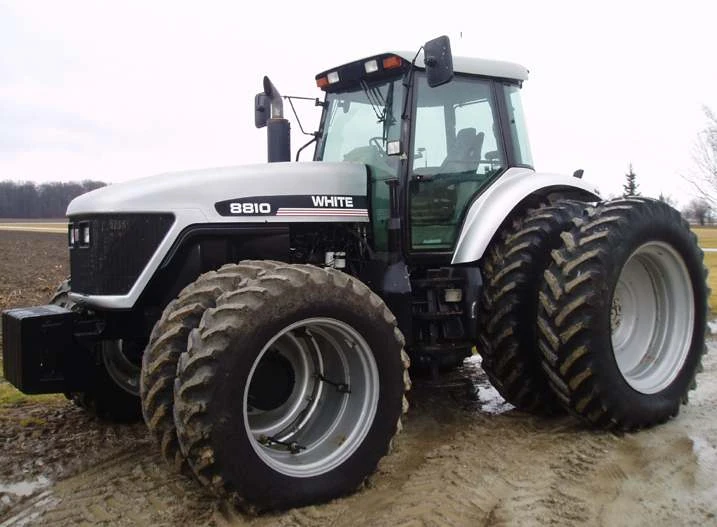
White 8810

White produced tractors, combines, outdoor equipment such as lawn tractors, corn planters, tillage equipment such as plows, disks and field cultivators 4 wheel Drive. Some of the products were made by outside companies to White specifications.

Due to financial struggles, in 1979 White Motor Corporation sold its agriculture division to a Texas firm called TIC.The White line was branded WFE (White Farm Equipment). The White Outdoor Equipment portion that offered Lawn & Garden equipment was sold to MTD in 1981. The agriculture market hit a severe recession in the early 1980s, and TIC sold WFE to Allied Products. Allied owned the New Idea farm equipment brand and formed a new division called White-New Idea. The White combine line was sold to Massey Ferguson in the late 1980s.

As it happened, Massey Ferguson later spun off the combine division into Massey Combines, then later re-absorbed the company after various lawsuits. After White and White-New Idea were sold to AGCO, AGCO also purchased Massey Ferguson, in effect, re-uniting the former White combine line with the former White tractor company.

Today White is an AGCO brand. AGCO was formed in 1990 by former Deutz-Allis executives. The executives took over Deutz-Allis and then purchased the White tractor line and Hesston Corporation brands in 1991. The remaining White-New Idea Company was purchased by AGCO in 1993 from Allied.

The White tractor line was produced by AGCO from 1991 through 2001 when the White line was merged with AGCO-Allis to create the AGCO brand.

The White name continued on under AGCO with the White Planter division until 2021 at which point, the planter line was absorbed into the Massey Ferguson brand of AGCO products. Though the branded White Planters are no longer produced, their legacy and innovations carry on within the planter industry.
