= Carraro Agritalia =

Italian agricultural machinery manufacturer

- Company type: Subsidiary
- Industry: Agricultural machinery
- Founded: 1977
- Founder: Antonio Carraro
- Headquarters: Rovigo, Italy
- Area served: Worldwide
- Products: Tractors
- Parent: Carraro Group
- Website: www.carrarotractors.com/en/

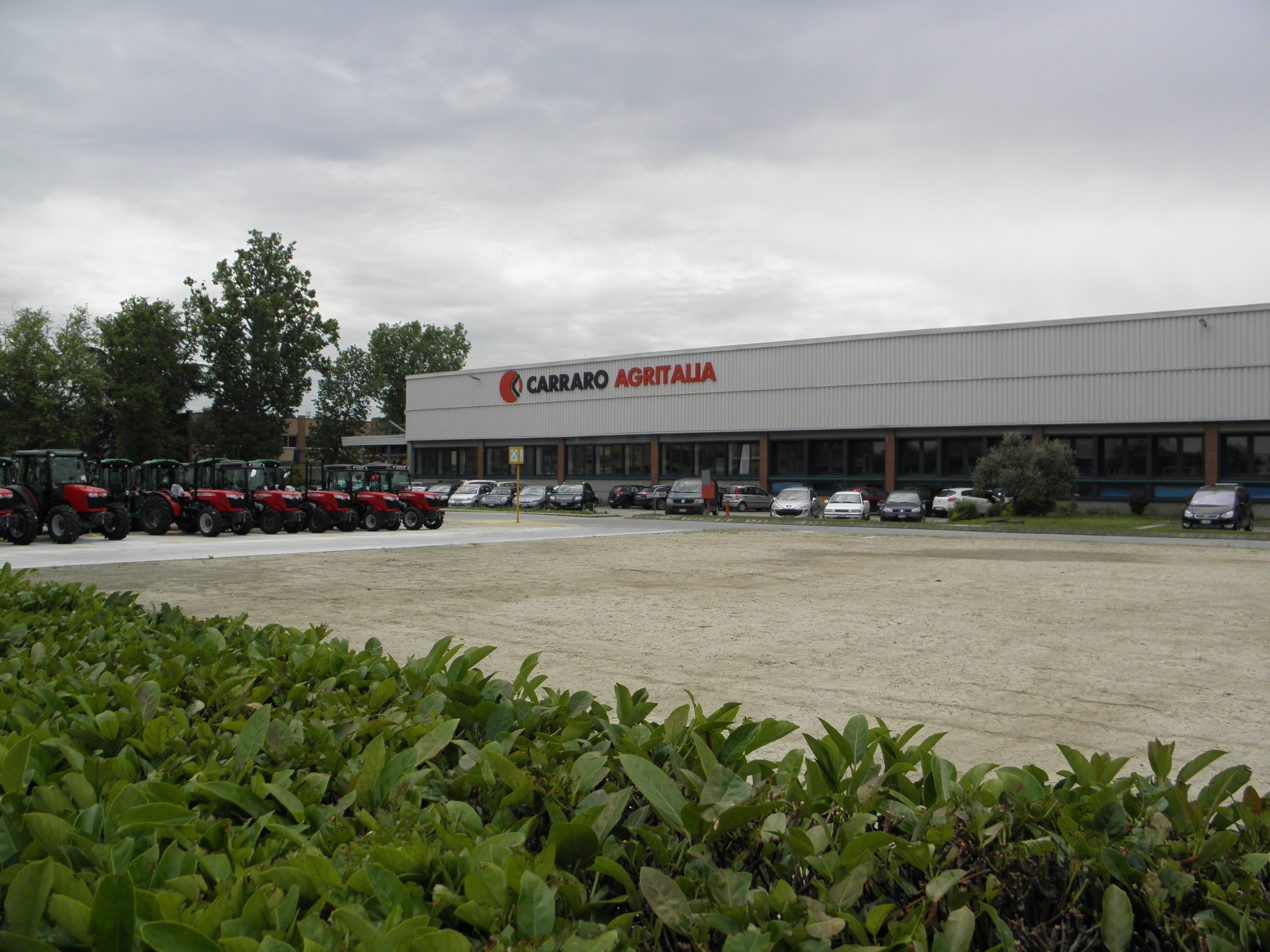
Carraro Agritalia factory in Rovigo.

Carraro Agritalia is an Italian agricultural machinery manufacturer that designs and builds standard, vineyard and orchard specialty tractors. Is a division of the Carraro Group, which is separate from Antonio Carraro. Carraro Group was founded in Campodarsego, Italy in 1910 as Giovanni Carraro. The division Carraro Agritalia was founded in Rovigo, Italy, in 1977.

== History ==
Carraro Group was founded by Giovanni Carraro and first manufactured agricultural equipment, seeders, in 1932. The first tractor was built in 1958. Antonio Carraro separated from his brothers in 1960 to form the Antonio Carraro company. In 1977 Carraro Group decided to transfer the production of tractors to Rovigo.

== Products & Services ==
Carraro Agritalia designs and builds standard, vineyard and orchard specialty tractors from 55-100 hp under contract for various tractor manufacturers and distributors. Current and past clients include: Antonio Carraro, Case IH, Challenger, Claas, Eicher, John Deere, Massey Ferguson, Renault, Valtra & Yagmur.

In 2010 Carraro Agritalia re-launched an own range of tractors sold under the logo Carraro, Tractors Built for the Best.

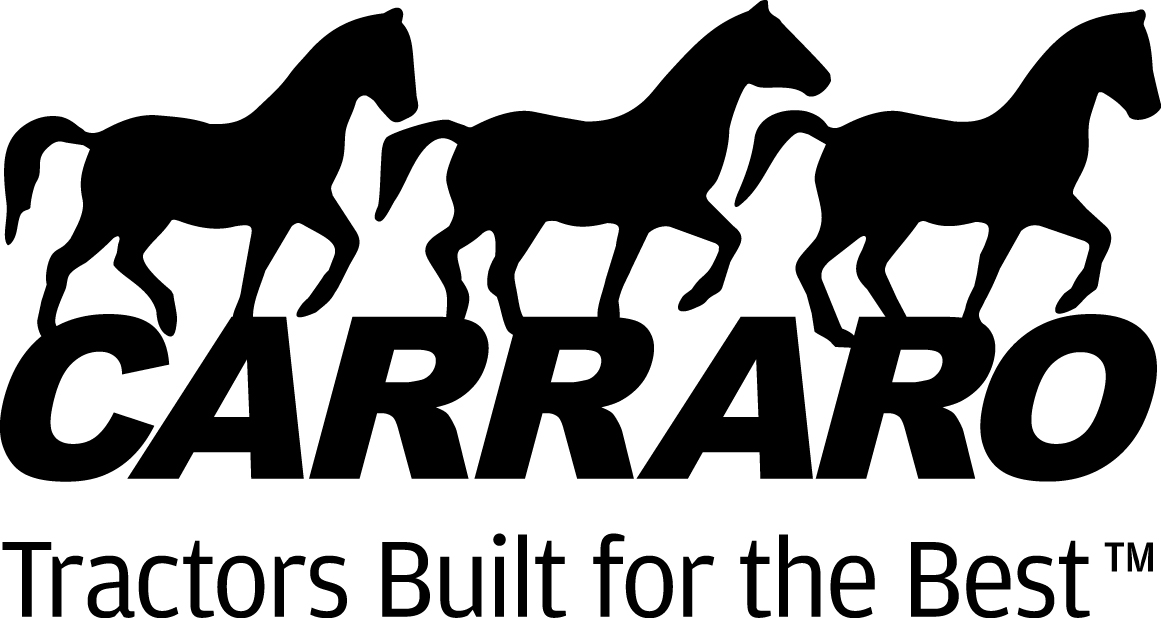
Logo used for the Carraro tractors produced by Carraro Agritalia

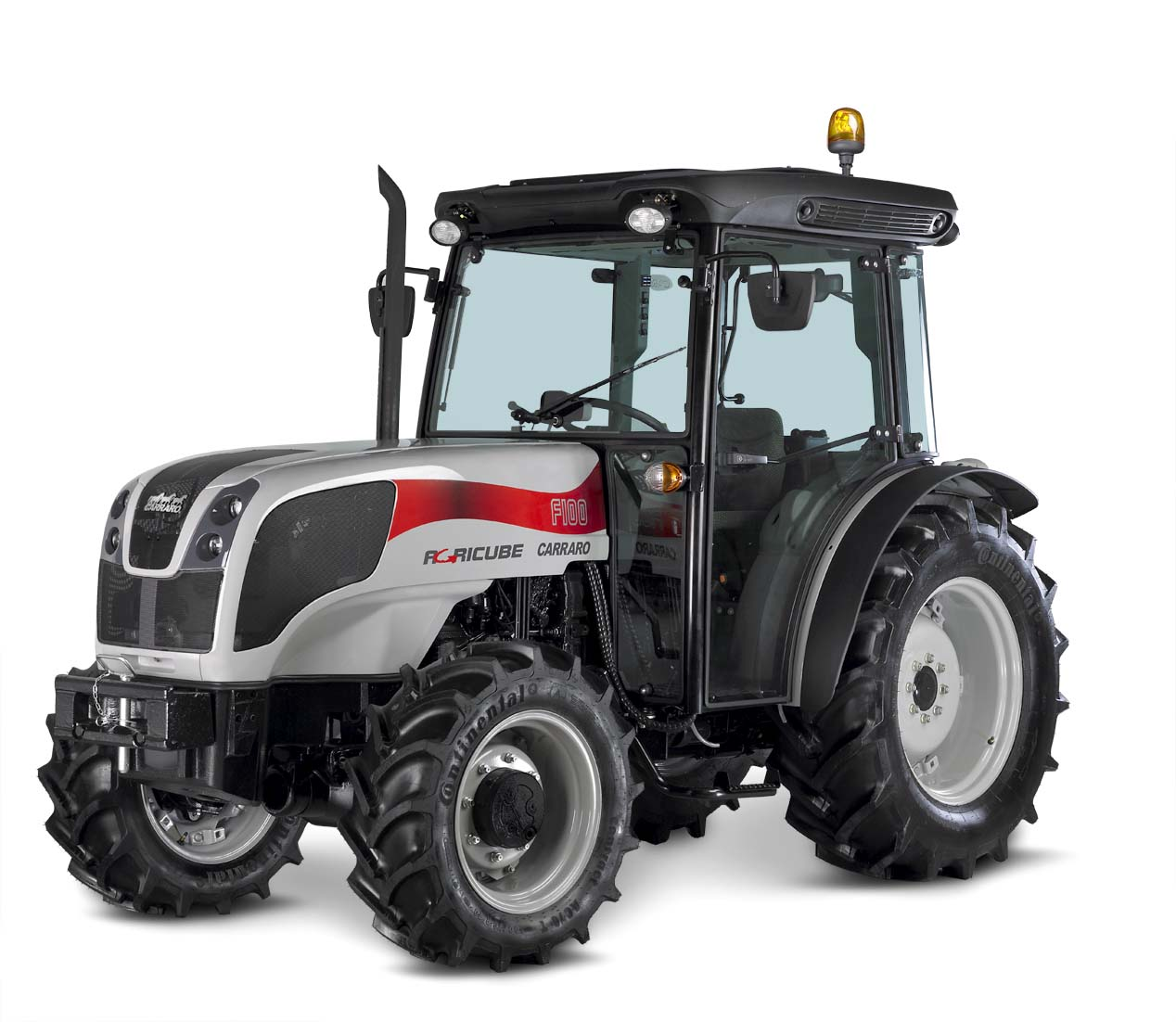
Carraro Agricube Tractor

Carraro Agritalia also offers engineering services for the design of tractors to third parties.

In October 2023, Carraro Spa (Agritalia) signed an agreement with Antonio Carraro to design and build some specialized tractors for Antonio Carraro under their brand, bringing the two companies into partnership again.
