= IPARC =

International Pesticide Application Research Consortium

Coordinates: 51.4088°N 0.6410°W

The International Pesticide Application Research Consortium (IPARC), previously known as the International Pesticide Application Research Centre and before that the Overseas Spray Machinery Centre (OSMC), has focused on pesticide application methods appropriate for smallholder farmers since 1955. It is now a research and training group whose purpose is to promote practical and cost-effective techniques, wherever possible, reducing the use of chemical pesticides, as part of Integrated Pest Management (IPM). IPARC has been an integral part of pesticide research and teaching at Silwood Park and has specialised in the needs of smallholder farmers, application techniques for migrant pests and control of disease vectors. IPARC is a World Health Organization (WHO) collaborating centre.

== Objectives ==
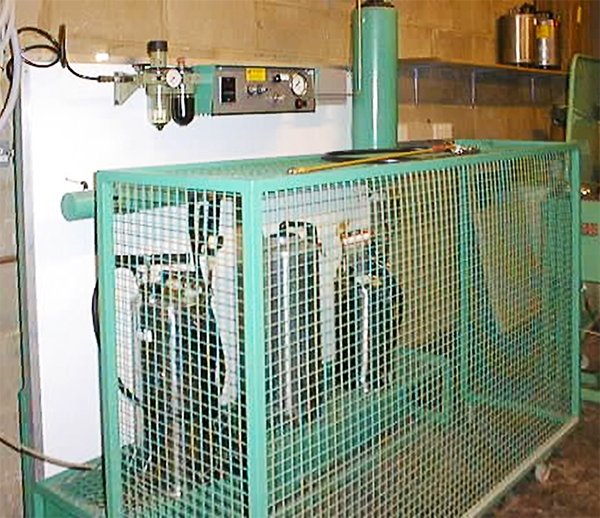
IPARC houses and carries out the WHO fatigue test for pressurised equipment: used for indoor residue spraying (IRS) against mosquitoes, other disease vectors and (sometimes) in agriculture

Besides teaching at the postgraduate level and carrying out bespoke training, staff carry out consultancy work for international organisations and commercial companies. Core expertise includes:

- Long-standing knowledge base on selection and use of sprayers appropriate for the developing world and seeing pesticide application as part of Integrated Pest Management (IPM).
- Pinpointing the target for control techniques and bridging the gap between laboratory and field via appropriate formulation and application; this has proved especially valuable in the development of biological pesticides (e.g. participation in LUBILOSA).
- Making application technology more accurate - research on development of nozzles, etc.
- Ensuring the quality of equipment - standards setting for application equipment and sprayer testing to ensure users get value for money.
- IPARC’s activities are endorsed by the WHO Pesticide Evaluation Scheme (WHOPES), and they include the evaluation of application equipment (e.g. compression sprayers) used for mosquito control.
- Participatory training of farmers and trainers; providing manuals & books to assist in IPM training world-wide.

== Transfer to Harper Adams University ==
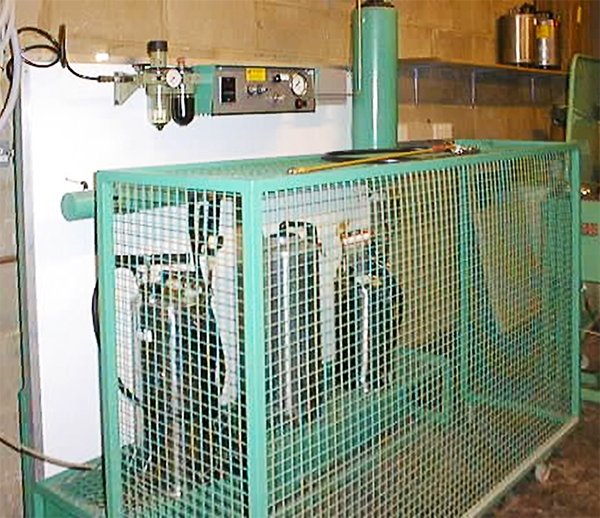
IPARC houses and carries out the WHO fatigue test for pressurised equipment: used for indoor residue spraying (IRS) against mosquitoes, other disease vectors and (sometimes) in agriculture

IPARC equipment was transferred to Harper Adams University by 2016; since then, activities have focused on international seminars and a 5th edition of Pesticide Application Methods.

== See also ==
- LUBILOSA
- pesticide application
