= Deutz-Allis =

Agricultural machinery manufacturers of Germany

- Industry: Agricultural
- Founded: 1985
- Headquarters: Germany/United States

Deutz-Allis was a company formed when Deutz-Fahr of Germany, part of KHD, purchased the agricultural assets of the Allis-Chalmers corporation in 1985.

== Company ==
Deutz-Allis was eventually sold to the Allis-Gleaner Corporation, or AGCO), in 1990. Deutz-Allis tractors and equipment were renamed in North America to be AGCO-Allis, but continued in South America until 2001, when the South American operations were renamed AGCO-Allis. In Argentina, the company manufactured the Deutz-Allis 5.125 L and the Deutz-Allis 5.190.

In North America, Deutz-Allis tractors carried both the traditional Deutz-green color, and Allis-orange color. In South America they were Deutz-green.
