= Sprayer =

Agricultural machine used in farms

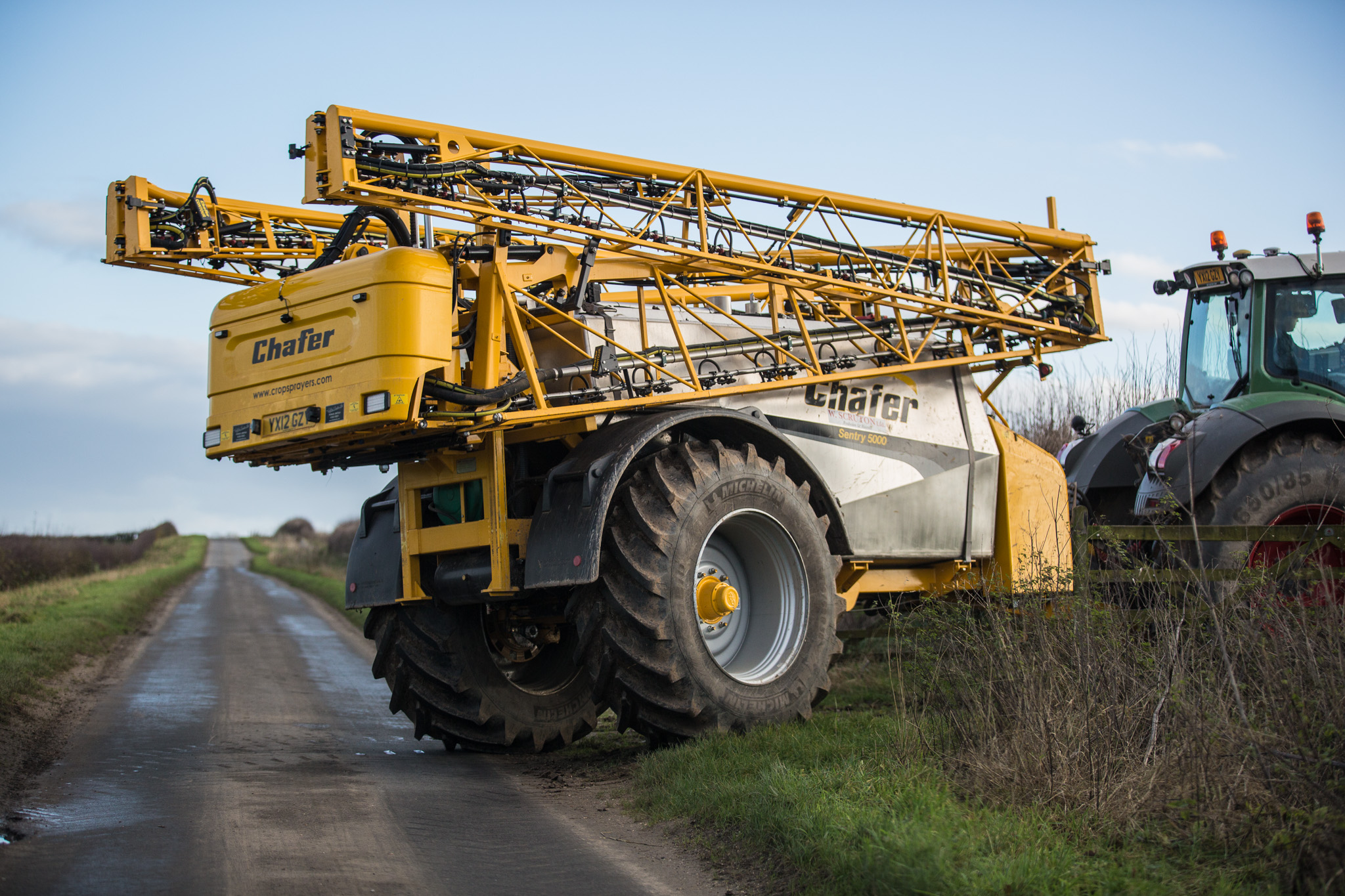
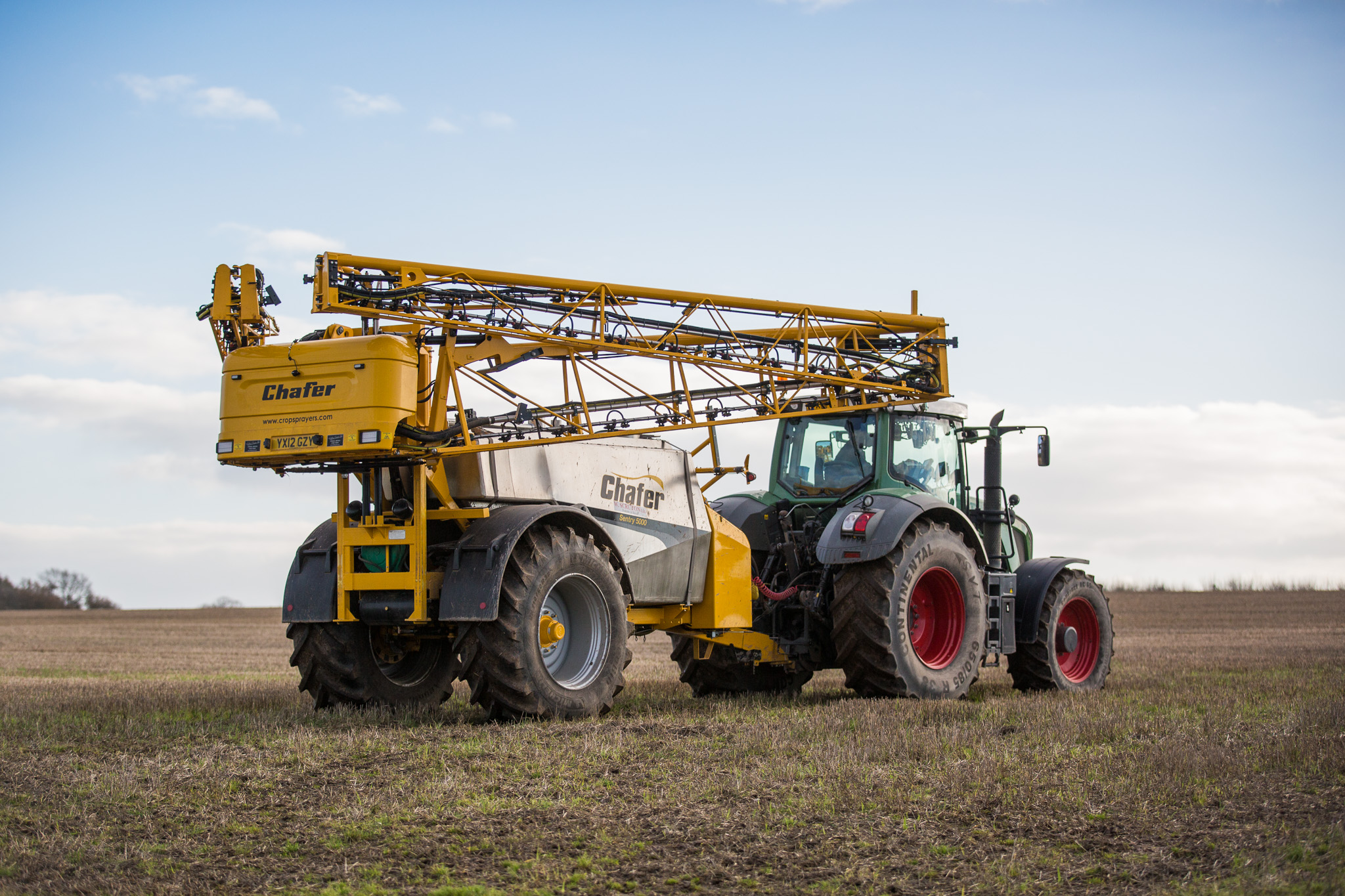
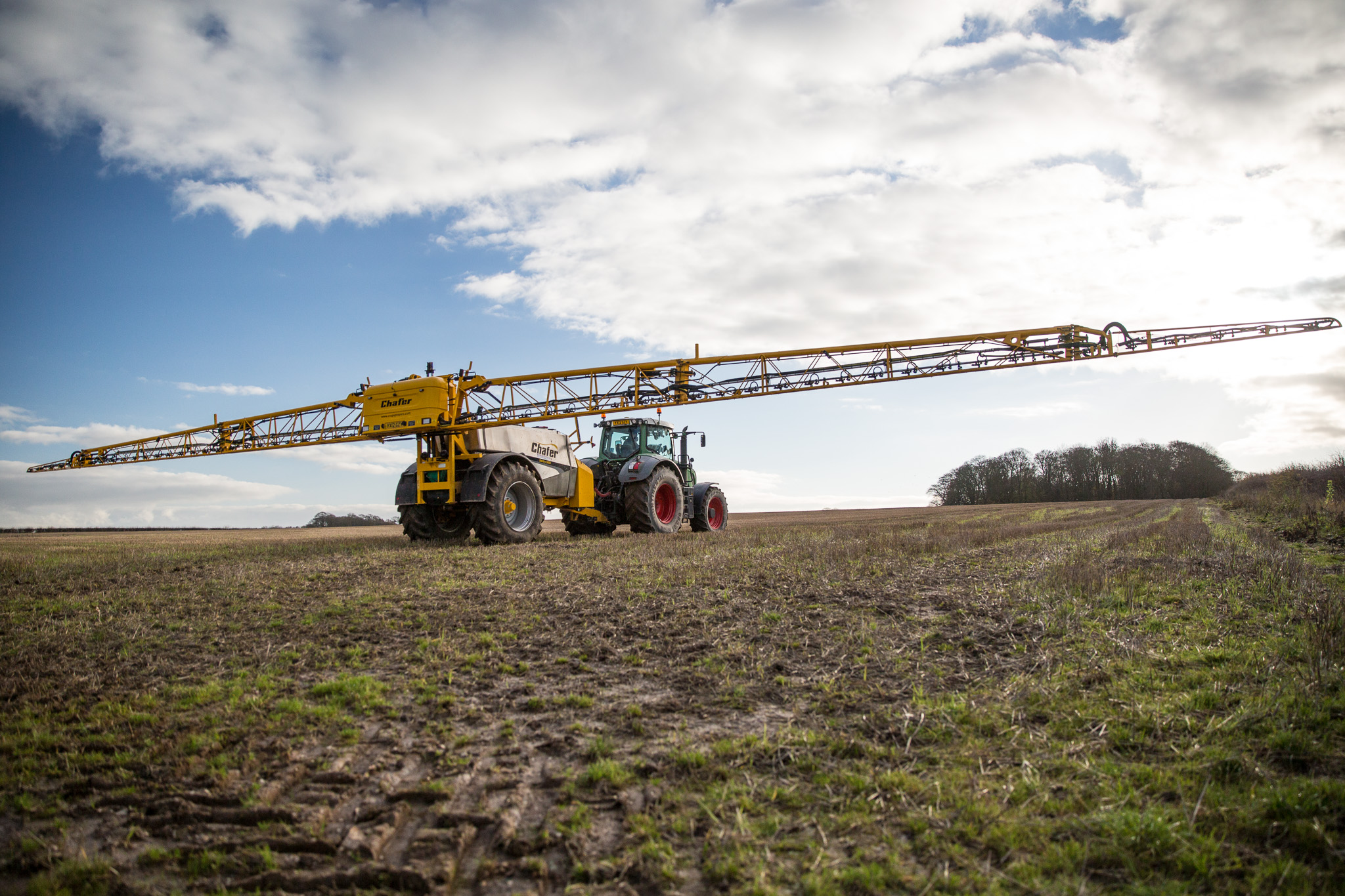
A field sprayer system in folded, partially unfolded and open configuration

Aerial video of a sprayer (unfolding and driving)

A sprayer is a device used to spray a liquid, where sprayers are commonly used for projection of water, weed killers, crop performance materials, pest maintenance chemicals, as well as manufacturing and production line ingredients. In agriculture, a sprayer is a piece of equipment that is used to apply herbicides, pesticides, and fertilizers on agricultural crops. Sprayers range in size from man-portable units (typically backpacks with spray guns) to trailed sprayers that are connected to a tractor, to self-propelled units similar to tractors with boom mounts of 4–30 feet (1.2–9.1 m) up to 60–151 feet (18–46 m) in length depending on engineering design for tractor and land size.

== Engineering ==
Sprayers are fully integrated, mechanical systems, meaning they are composed of various parts and components that work together to achieve the desired effect, in this case: the projection of the spray fluid. This can be as simple as a hand sprayer attached to a bottle that is pumped and primed by a spring-lever, tube, and vacuum-pressure; or as complex as a 150 foot reach boom sprayer with a list of system components that work together to deliver the spray fluid.

For more complex sprayers, such as agricultural sprayers, common system components include: the spray nozzle, sometimes with a spray gun, fluid tank, sprayer pump, pressure regulators, valves and gaskets, and fluid plumbing. The sprayer pump can be just as important as the sprayer type itself as there are many sprayer pump design types with various construction materials, inlet/outlet sizes, and performance specifications. Common sprayer pump types include diaphragm, centrifugal, and roller pumps.

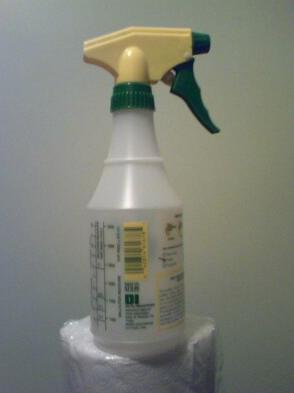
A bottle with a hand-pumped sprayer

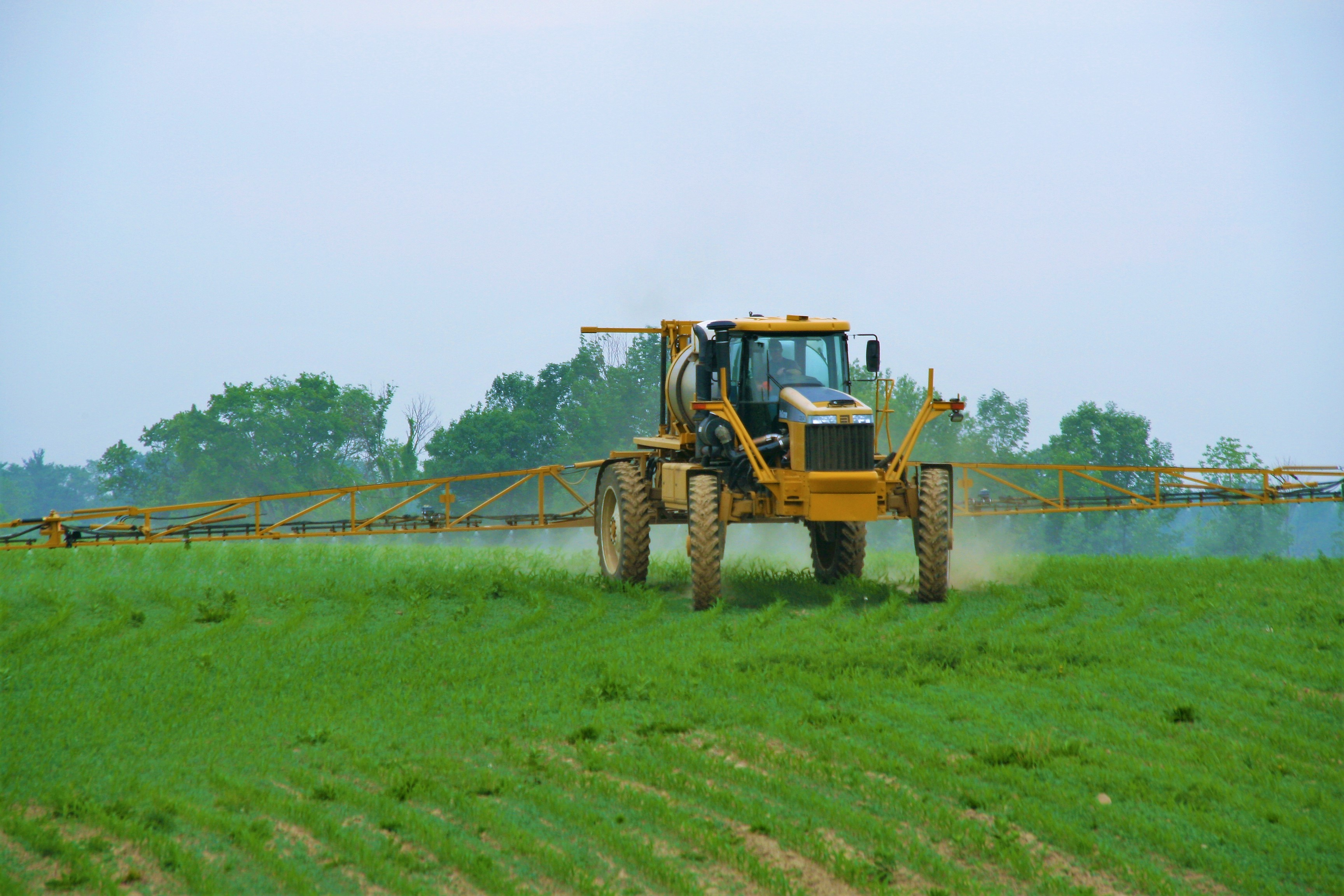
Self-propelled row-crop sprayer

== Agricultural sprayers ==
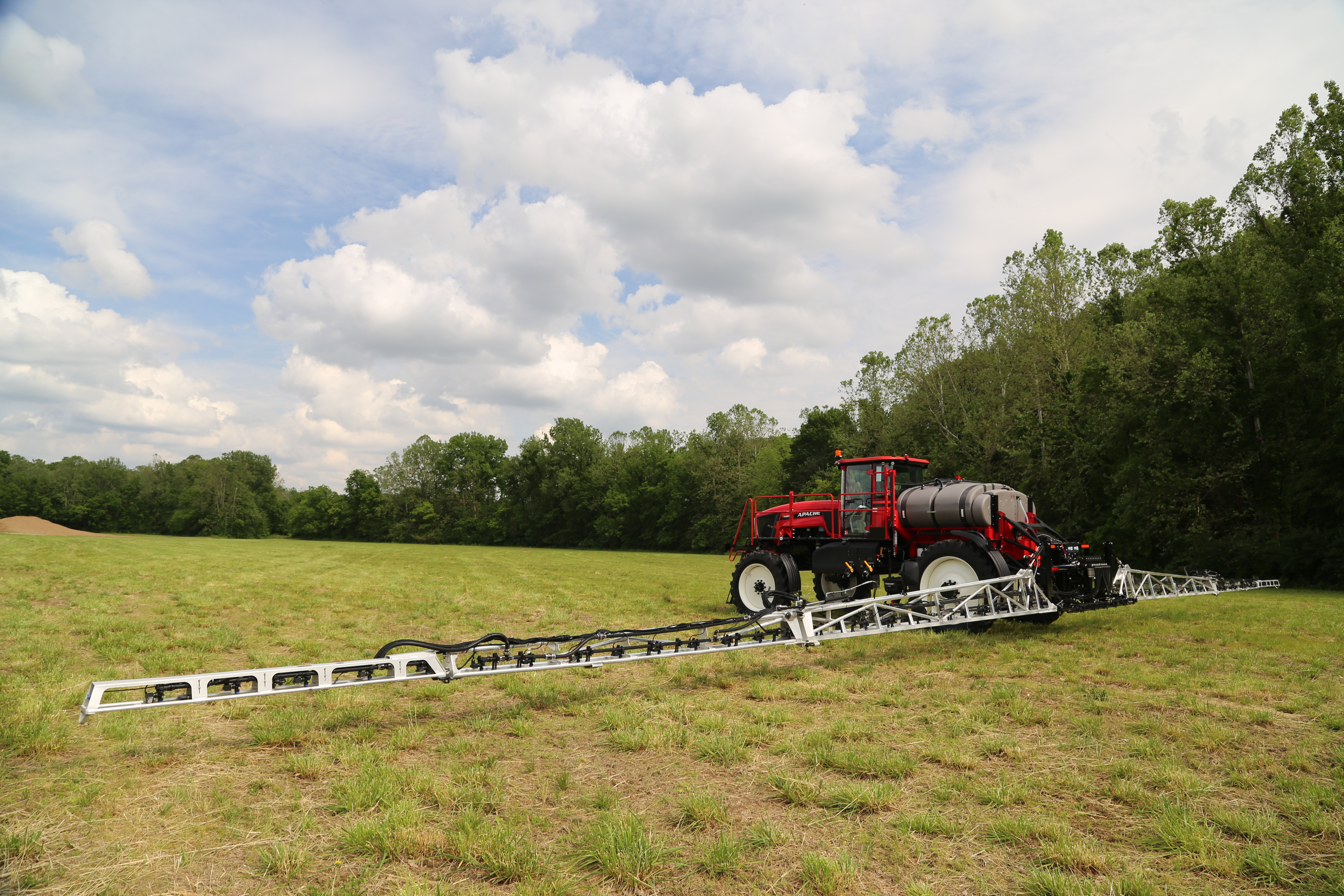
Self-propelled sprayer with aluminum booms

Agricultural sprayers come in various design types, sizes, equipment and performance specifications. They range from small spot-spraying machines to very large sprayers with extensive land and plant coverage. Agricultural sprayers have been engineered to optimize their applicability and performance for the many purposes that the machines are put to, whether being used on crops, vegetation, or soil. Agriculture sprayers are often used for applying water and water/chemical solutions containing acids or caustic materials for crop-performance or pest-control; i.e. fertilizers and pesticides.

There are a number of agriculture sprayers designed for spraying applications and designed to be versatile and suitable for various uses from spot applications, gardens, crops, row crops, crop trees, fruit, groves, vineyards, perimeter maintenance, livestock needs, weed control, pastures and rangeland. Self-propelled sprayers help farmers improve spraying efficiency and productivity while taking full advantage of every minute they have in the field.

Examples of general sprayer types include:

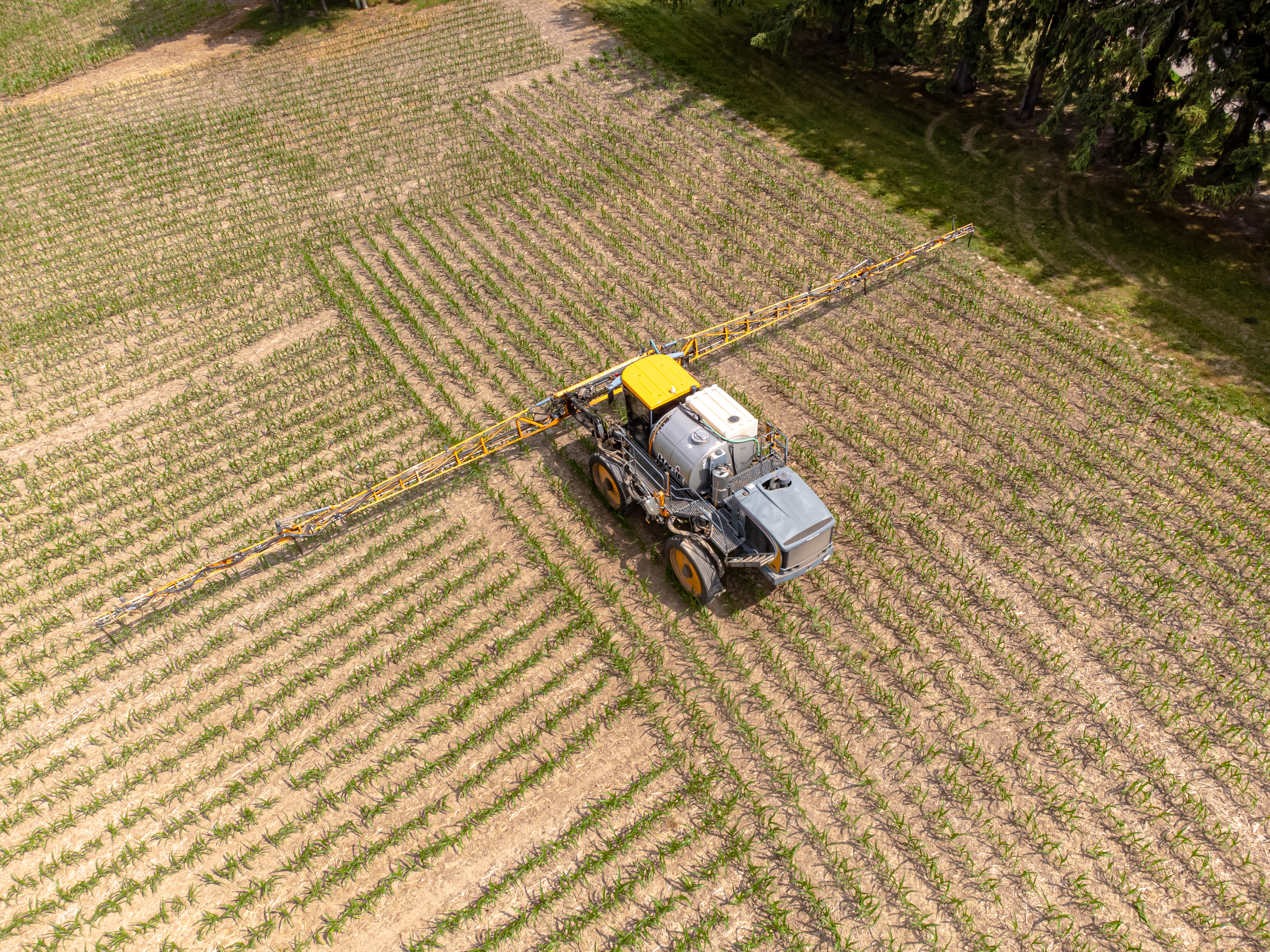
Fertilizer sprayer

1. Boom sprayer
2. Boomless sprayer nozzle
3. Mist sprayer
4. Three-point hitch sprayer
5. Truck-bed sprayer
6. Towing-hitch sprayer
7. UTV sprayer
8. ATV sprayer
9. Spot sprayer
10. Backpack sprayer

== See also ==
- Agricultural Machinery
- Aerial application
- Gardening
- Flit gun
- Pesticide application
- Pressure washer
- Spray bottle
- Spray nozzle
- Stirrup pump
