= Pesticide application =

Delivery of pesticides

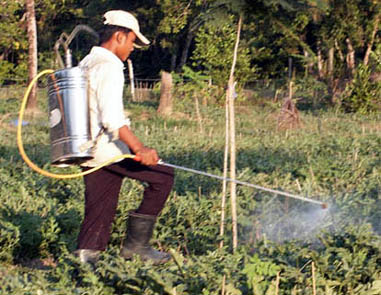
A manual backpack-type sprayer

Space treatment against mosquitoes using a thermal fogger

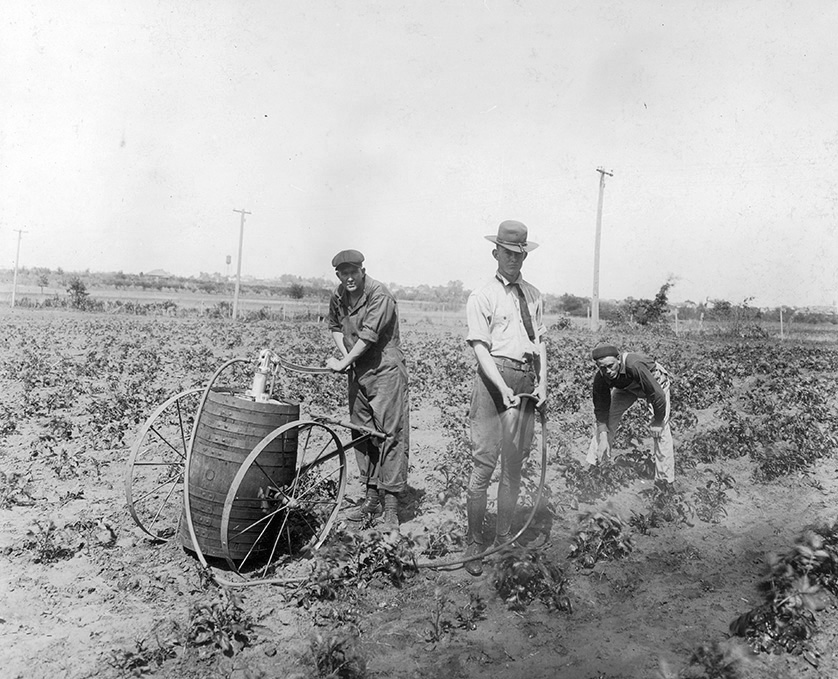
Grubbs Vocational College students spraying Irish potatoes

Pesticide application is the practical way in which pesticides (including herbicides, fungicides, insecticides, or nematicides) are delivered to their biological targets (e.g. pest organism, crop or other plant).

Pesticides and other agrochemicals can be applied in several ways. Conventional application methods include ground-based foliar sprays, root drenches, broadcasting of granules, and seed coating; aerial application methods have recently included agricultural drones.

Other methods, used less commonly on farms, but more in small scale, domestic or garden application are soil injection, spot treatment, wiper application and space treatments (foggers).

== Seed treatments ==
Seed treatments can achieve exceptionally high efficiencies, in terms of effective dose-transfer to a crop. Pesticides are applied to the seed prior to planting, in the form of a seed treatment, or coating, to protect against soil-borne risks to the plant; additionally, these coatings can provide supplemental chemicals and nutrients designed to encourage growth. A typical seed coating can include a nutrient layer—containing nitrogen, phosphorus, and potassium, a rhizobial layer—containing symbiotic bacteria and other beneficial microorganisms, and a fungicide (or other chemical) layer to make the seed less vulnerable to pests.

== Spray application ==
One of the most common forms of pesticide application, especially in conventional agriculture, is the use of mechanical sprayers. Hydraulic sprayers consists of a tank, a pump, a lance (for single nozzles) or boom, and a nozzle (or multiple nozzles). Sprayers convert a pesticide formulation, often containing a mixture of water (or another liquid chemical carrier, such as fertilizer) and chemical, into droplets, which can be large rain-type drops or tiny almost-invisible particles. This conversion is accomplished by forcing the spray mixture through a spray nozzle under pressure. The size of droplets can be altered through the use of different nozzle sizes, or by altering the pressure under which it is forced, or a combination of both. Large droplets have the advantage of being less susceptible to spray drift, but require more water per unit of land covered. Due to static electricity, small droplets are able to maximize contact with a target organism, but very still wind conditions are required to avoid drift.

Efficacy can be related to the quality of pesticide application, with small droplets, such as aerosols often improving performance.

=== Spraying pre- and post-emergent crops ===
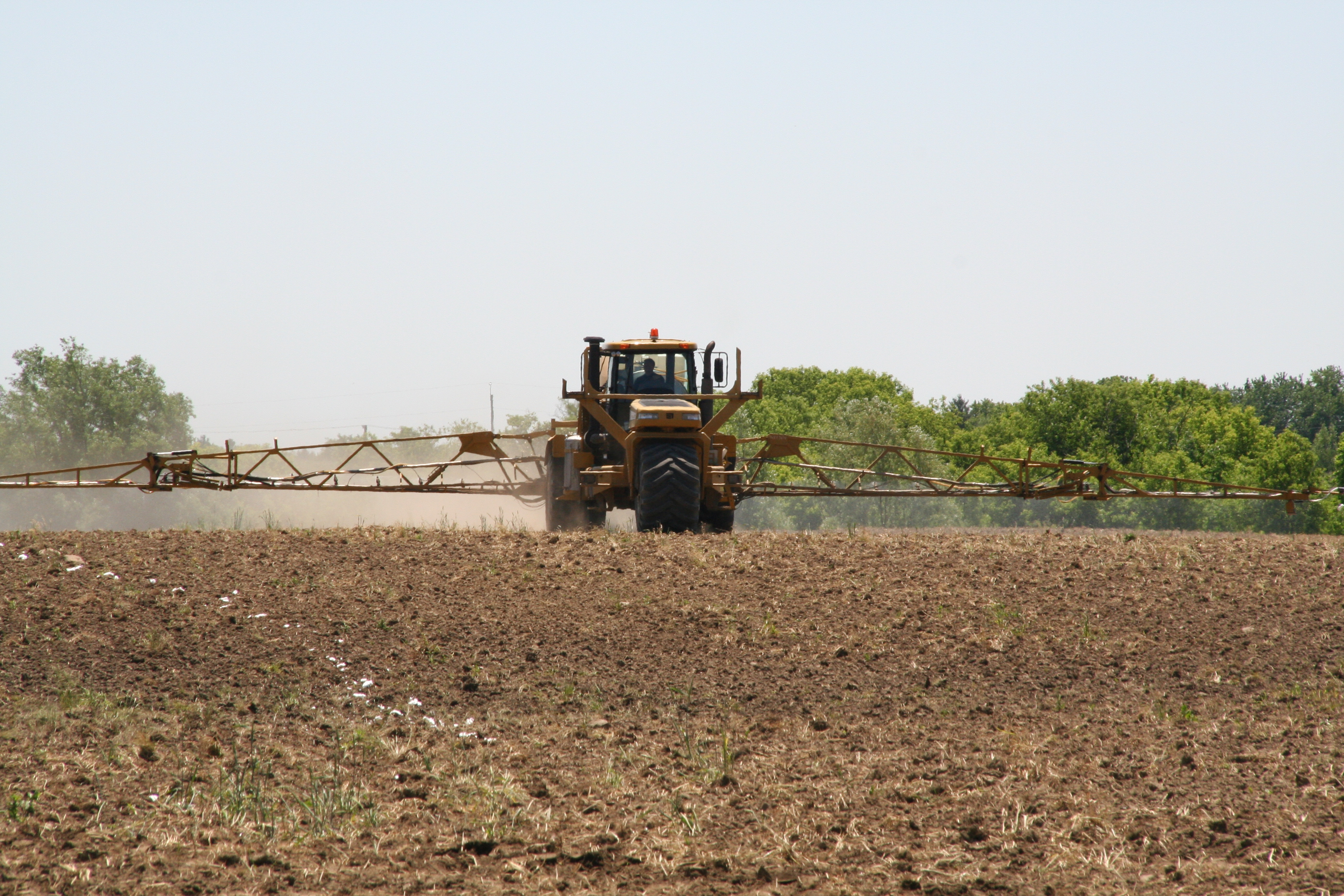
Large self-propelled agricultural 'floater' sprayer, engaged in pre-emergent pesticide application

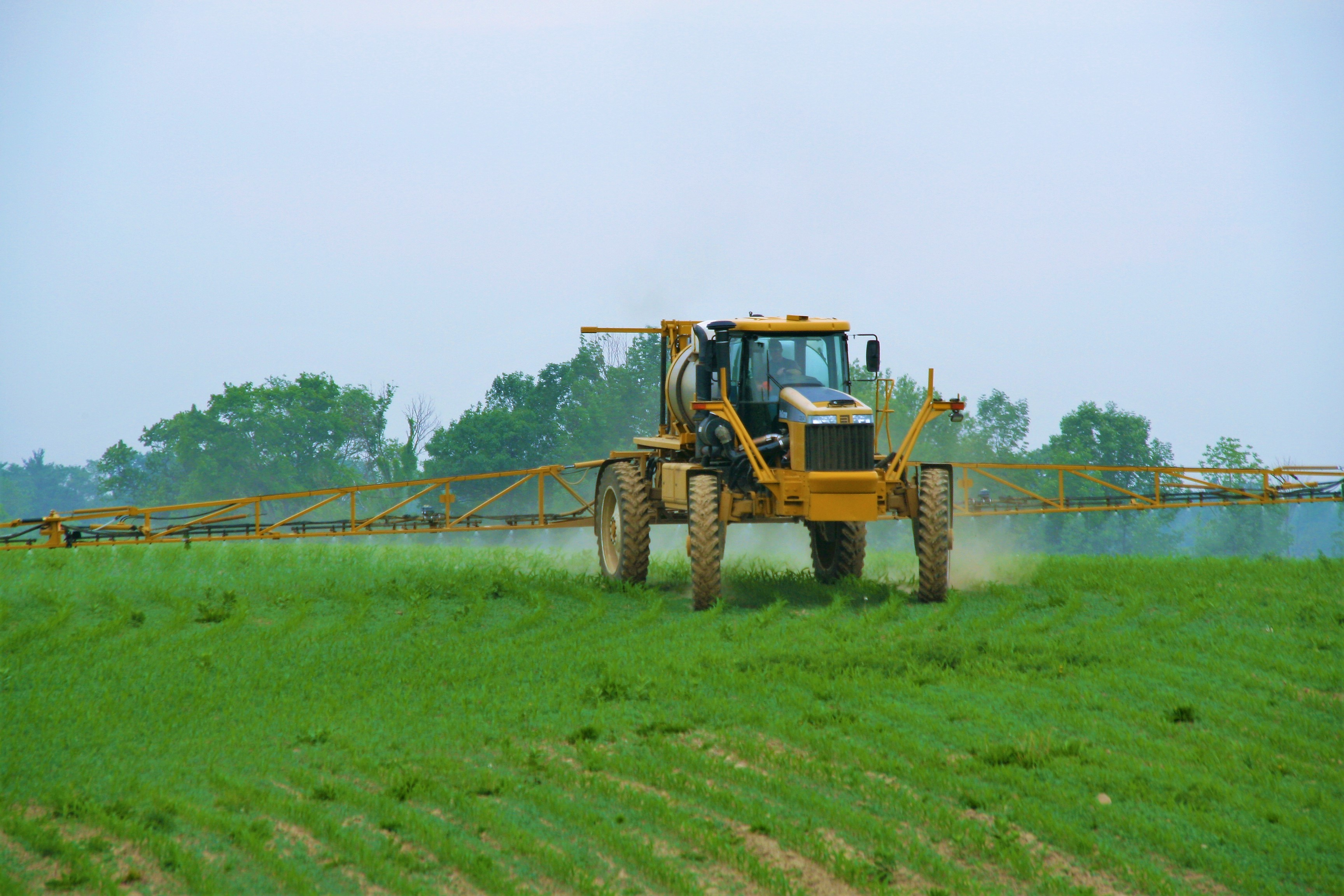
Self-propelled row-crop sprayer applying pesticide to post-emergent corn

Traditional agricultural crop pesticides can either be applied pre-emergent or post-emergent, a term referring to the germination status of the plant. Pre-emergent pesticide application, in conventional agriculture, attempts to reduce competitive pressure on newly germinated plants by removing undesirable organisms and maximizing the amount of water, soil nutrients, and sunlight available for the crop. An example of pre-emergent pesticide application is atrazine application for corn. Similarly, glyphosate mixtures are often applied pre-emergent on agricultural fields to remove early-germinating weeds and prepare for subsequent crops. Pre-emergent application equipment often has large, wide tires designed to float on soft soil, minimizing both soil compaction and damage to planted (but not yet emerged) crops. A three-wheel application machine, such as the one pictured on the right, is designed so that tires do not follow the same path, minimizing the creation of ruts in the field and limiting sub-soil damage.

Post-emergent pesticide application requires the use of specific chemicals chosen to minimize harm to the desirable target organism. An example is 2,4-Dichlorophenoxyacetic acid, which will injure broadleaf weeds (dicots) but leave behind grasses (monocots). Such a chemical has been used extensively on wheat crops, for example. A number of companies have also created genetically modified organisms that are resistant to various pesticides. Examples include glyphosate-resistant soybeans and Bt maize, which change the types of formulations involved in addressing post-emergent pesticide pressure. It was important to also note that even given appropriate chemical choices, high ambient temperatures or other environmental influences, can allow the non-targeted desirable organism to be damaged during application. As plants have already germinated, post-emergent pesticide application necessitates limited field contact in order to minimize losses due to crop and soil damage. Typical industrial application equipment will utilize very tall and narrow tires and combine this with a sprayer body which can be raised and lowered depending on crop height. These sprayers usually carry the label ‘high-clearance’ as they can rise over growing crops, although usually not much more than 1 or 2 meters high. In addition, these sprayers often have very wide booms in order to minimize the number of passes required over a field, again designed to limit crop damage and maximize efficiency. In industrial agriculture, spray booms 120 feet (37 meters) wide are not uncommon, especially in prairie agriculture with large, flat fields. Related to this, aerial pesticide application is a method of top dressing a pesticide to an emerged crop which eliminates physical contact with soil and crops.

Air Blast sprayers, also known as air-assisted or mist sprayers, are often used for tall crops, such as tree fruit, where boom sprayers and aerial application would be ineffective. These types of sprayers can only be used where overspray—spray drift—is less of a concern, either through the choice of chemical which does not have undesirable effects on other desirable organisms, or by adequate buffer distance. These can be used for insects, weeds, and other pests to crops, humans, and animals. Air blast sprayers inject liquid into a fast-moving stream of air, breaking down large droplets into smaller particles by introducing a small amount of liquid into a fast-moving stream of air.

Foggers fulfill a similar role to mist sprayers in producing particles of very small size, but use a different method. Whereas mist sprayers create a high-speed stream of air which can travel significant distances, foggers use a piston or bellows to create a stagnant area of pesticide that is often used for enclosed areas, such as houses and animal shelters.

=== Spraying inefficiencies ===
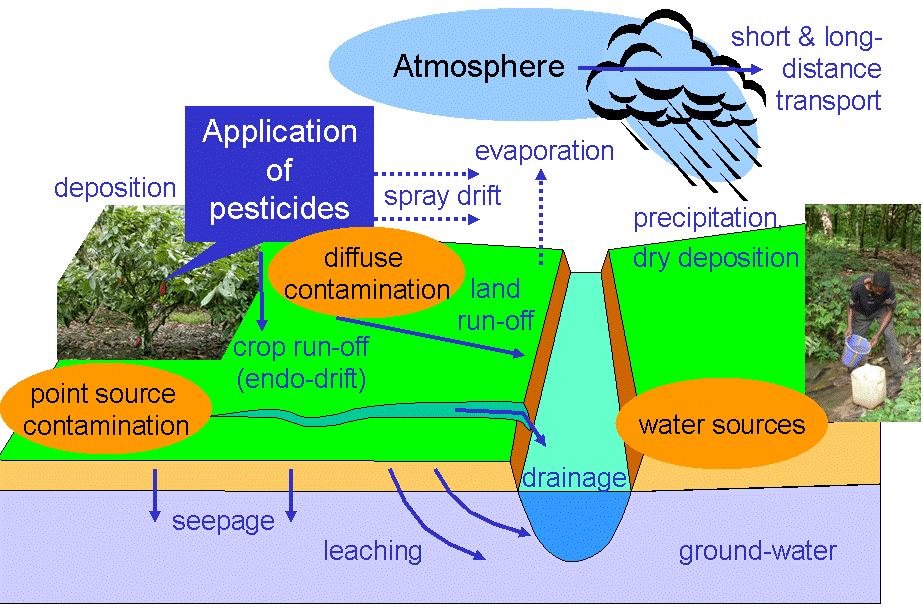
Sources of environmental contamination with pesticides

In order to better understand the cause of the spray inefficiency, it is useful to reflect on the implications of the large range of droplet sizes produced by typical (hydraulic) spray nozzles. This has long been recognized to be one of the most important concepts in spray application (e.g. Himel, 1969), bringing about enormous variations in the properties of droplets.

Historically, dose-transfer to the biological target (i.e. the pest) has been shown to be inefficient. However, relating "ideal" deposits with biological effect is fraught with difficulty, but in spite of Hislop's misgivings about detail, there have been several demonstrations that massive amounts of pesticides are wasted by run-off from the crop and into the soil, in a process called endo-drift. This is a less familiar form of pesticide drift, with exo-drift causing much greater public concern. Pesticides are conventionally applied using hydraulic atomisers, either on hand-held sprayers or tractor booms, where formulations are mixed into high volumes of water.

Different droplet sizes have dramatically different dispersal characteristics, and are subject to complex macro- and micro-climatic interactions (Bache & Johnstone, 1992). Greatly simplifying these interactions in terms of droplet size and wind speed, Craymer & Boyle concluded that there are essentially three sets of conditions under which droplets move from the nozzle to the target. These are where:

- sedimentation dominates: typically larger (>100 μm) droplets applied at low wind-speeds; droplets above this size are appropriate for minimising drift contamination by herbicides.
- turbulent eddies dominate: typically small droplets (<50 μm) that are usually considered most appropriate for targeting flying insects, unless an electrostatic charge is also present that provides the necessary force to attract droplets to foliage. (NB: the latter effects only operate at very short distances, typically under 10 mm.)
- intermediate conditions where both sedimentation and drift effects are important. Most agricultural insecticide and fungicide spraying is optimised by using relatively small (say 50-150 μm) droplets in order to maximize “coverage” (droplets per unit area), but are also subject to drift.

==== Herbicide volatilisation ====
Herbicide volatilisation refers to evaporation or sublimation of a volatile herbicide. The effect of gaseous chemical is lost at its intended place of application and may move downwind and affect other plants not intended to be affected causing crop damage. Herbicides vary in their susceptibility to volatilisation. Prompt incorporation of the herbicide into the soil may reduce or prevent volatilisation. Wind, temperature, and humidity also affect the rate of volatilisation with humidity reducing in. 2,4-D and dicamba are commonly used chemicals that are known to be subject to volatilisation but there are many others. Application of herbicides later in the season to protect herbicide-resistant genetically modified plants increases the risk of volatilisation as the temperature is higher and incorporation into the soil impractical.

=== Improved targeting ===
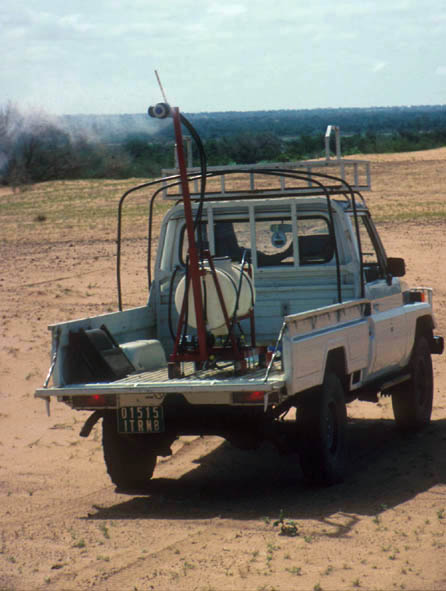
The Ulvamast Mk II: a ULV sprayer for locust control (photo taken in Niger)

In the 1970s and 1980s improved application technologies such as controlled droplet application (CDA) received extensive research interest, but commercial uptake has been disappointing. By controlling droplet size, ultra-low volume (ULV) or very low volume (VLV) application rates of pesticidal mixtures can achieve similar (or sometimes better) biological results by improved timing and dose-transfer to the biological target (i.e. pest). No atomizer has been developed able to produce uniform (monodisperse) droplets, but rotary (spinning disc and cage) atomizers usually produce a more uniform droplet size spectrum than conventional hydraulic nozzles (see: CDA & ULV application equipment). Other efficient application techniques include: banding, baiting, specific granule placement, seed treatments and weed wiping.

CDA is a good example of a rational pesticide use (RPU) technology (Bateman, 2003), but unfortunately has been unfashionable with public funding bodies since the early 1990s, with many believing that all pesticide development should be the responsibility of pesticide manufacturers. On the other hand, pesticide companies are unlikely widely to promote better targeting and thus reduced pesticide sales, unless they can benefit by adding value to products in some other way. RPU contrasts dramatically with the promotion of pesticides, and many agrochemical concerns, have equally become aware that product stewardship provides better long-term profitability than high pressure salesmanship of a dwindling number of new “silver bullet” molecules. RPU may therefore provide an appropriate framework for collaboration between many of the stake-holders in crop protection.

Understanding the biology and life cycle of the pest is also an important factor in determining droplet size. The Agricultural Research Service, for example, has conducted tests to determine the ideal droplet size of a pesticide used to combat corn earworms. They found that in order to be effective, the pesticide needs to penetrate through the corn's silk, where the earworm's larvae hatch. The research concluded that larger pesticide droplets best penetrated the targeted corn silk. Knowing where the pest's destruction originates is crucial in targeting the amount of pesticide needed.

=== Quality and assessment of equipment ===
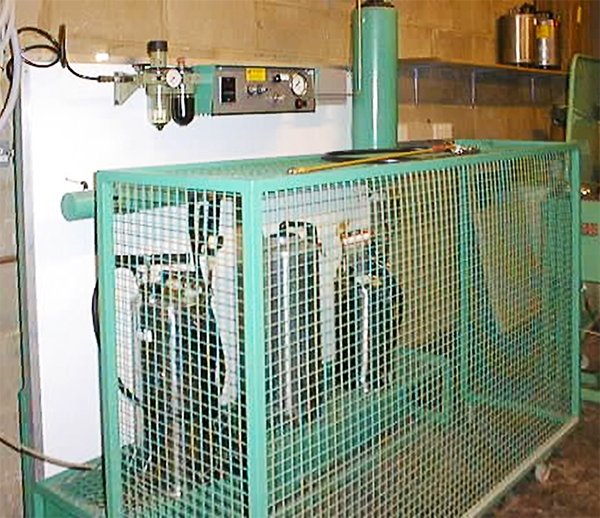
IPARC housed the World Health Organization fatigue test for pressurised hydraulic equipment: used for indoor residue spraying (IRS) against mosquitoes, other disease vectors and (sometimes) in agriculture

Ensuring quality of sprayers by testing and setting of standards for application equipment is important to ensure users get value for money. Since most equipment uses various hydraulic nozzles, various initiatives have attempted to classify spray quality, starting with the BCPC system.

=== Road maintenance ===
Roadsides receive substantial quantities of herbicides, both intentionally applied for their maintenance and due to herbicide drift from adjacent applications. This often kills off-target plants.

== Other application methods ==
=== Application methods for household insecticides ===
Pest management in the home begins with restricting the availability to insects of three vital commodities: shelter, water and food. If insects become a problem despite such measures, it may become necessary to control them using chemical methods, targeting the active ingredient to the particular pest. Insect repellent, referred to as "bug spray", comes in a plastic bottle or aerosol can. Applied to clothing, arms, legs, and other extremities, the use of these products will tend to ward off nearby insects. This is not an insecticide.

Insecticide used for killing pests—most often insects, and arachnids—primarily comes in an aerosol can, and is sprayed directly on the insect or its nest as a means of killing it. Fly sprays will kill house flies, blowflies, ants, cockroaches and other insects and also spiders. Other preparations are granules or liquids that are formulated with bait that is eaten by insects. For many household pests bait traps are available that contain the pesticide and either pheromone or food baits. Crack and crevice sprays are applied into and around openings in houses such as baseboards and plumbing. Pesticides to control termites are often injected into and around the foundations of homes.

Active ingredients of many household insecticides include permethrin and tetramethrin, which act on the nervous system of insects and arachnids.

Bug sprays should be used in well ventilated areas only, as the chemicals contained in the aerosol and most insecticides can be harmful or deadly to humans and pets. All insecticide products including solids, baits and bait traps should be applied such that they are out of reach of wildlife, pets and children.

== See also ==
- aerial application
- International pesticide application research consortium (IPARC)
- Aerosol spray
- Formulation
- Integrated pest management (IPM)
- Pest control
- Pesticide
- Insecticide
- Fungicide
- Weed control
- Pesticide drift
- sprayer
- spray nozzle
