= Jaguar I =

Jaguar I may refer to:

== Jaguar I car models ==
- Jaguar I-Type Formula E race cars from Jaguar Racing

Jaguar street cars for Jaguar Cars

- Jaguar I-Pace (2018) all-electric battery-powered SUV
- Jaguar Mark 1 (1955–1959) saloon car

== Other uses ==
- Armstrong Siddeley Jaguar I, aero engine
- Jaguar 1 (RakJPz.3) West German tank destroyer
- Jaguar (EP), EP from Victoria Monét

== See also ==
- Jaguar (disambiguation)
- Jaguar 2
- Jaguar II (disambiguation)
- I (disambiguation)
