= Fendt =

German agricultural machinery manufacturer

- Type: GmbH
- Industry: Agricultural machinery
- Founded: 1930; 96 years ago
- Founder: Xaver Fendt
- Headquarters: Marktoberdorf, Germany
- Area served: Worldwide
- Key people: Walter Wagner, Christoph Gröblinghoff, Ingrid Bußjäger-Martin, Ekkehart Gläser
- Products: Tractors; Combine harvesters Balers; Telescopic handlers Planters
- Parent: AGCO
- Website: www.fendt.com

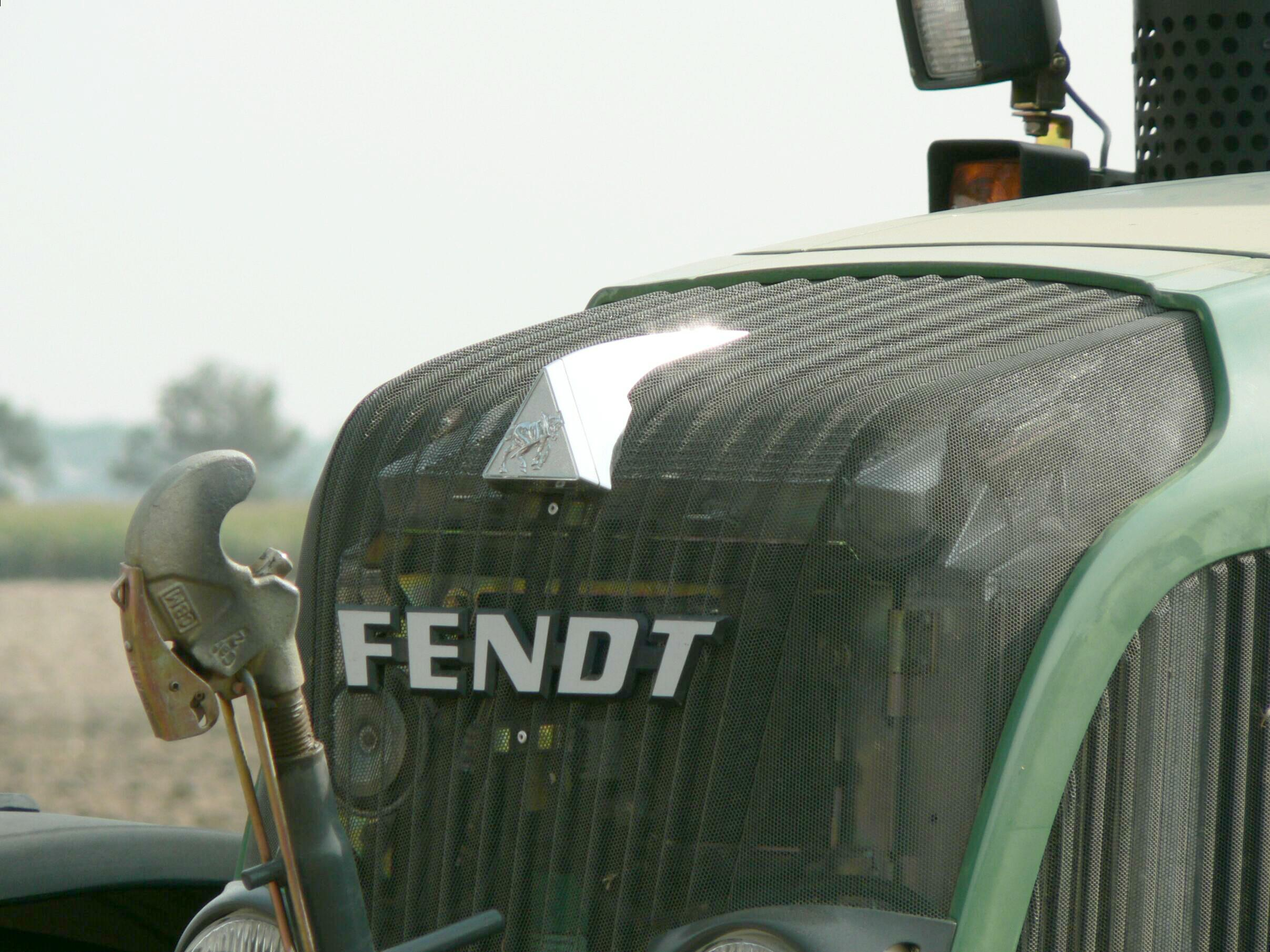
Fendt logo on an 818 front grill

Fendt is a German machinery manufacturer founded in 1930 by Xaver Fendt in Marktoberdorf in the Allgäu region of Bavaria, Germany. Fendt manufactures tractors, combine harvesters, forage harvesters, balers, telescopic handlers and row crop planters. It was purchased by AGCO Corporation in 1997.

== History ==
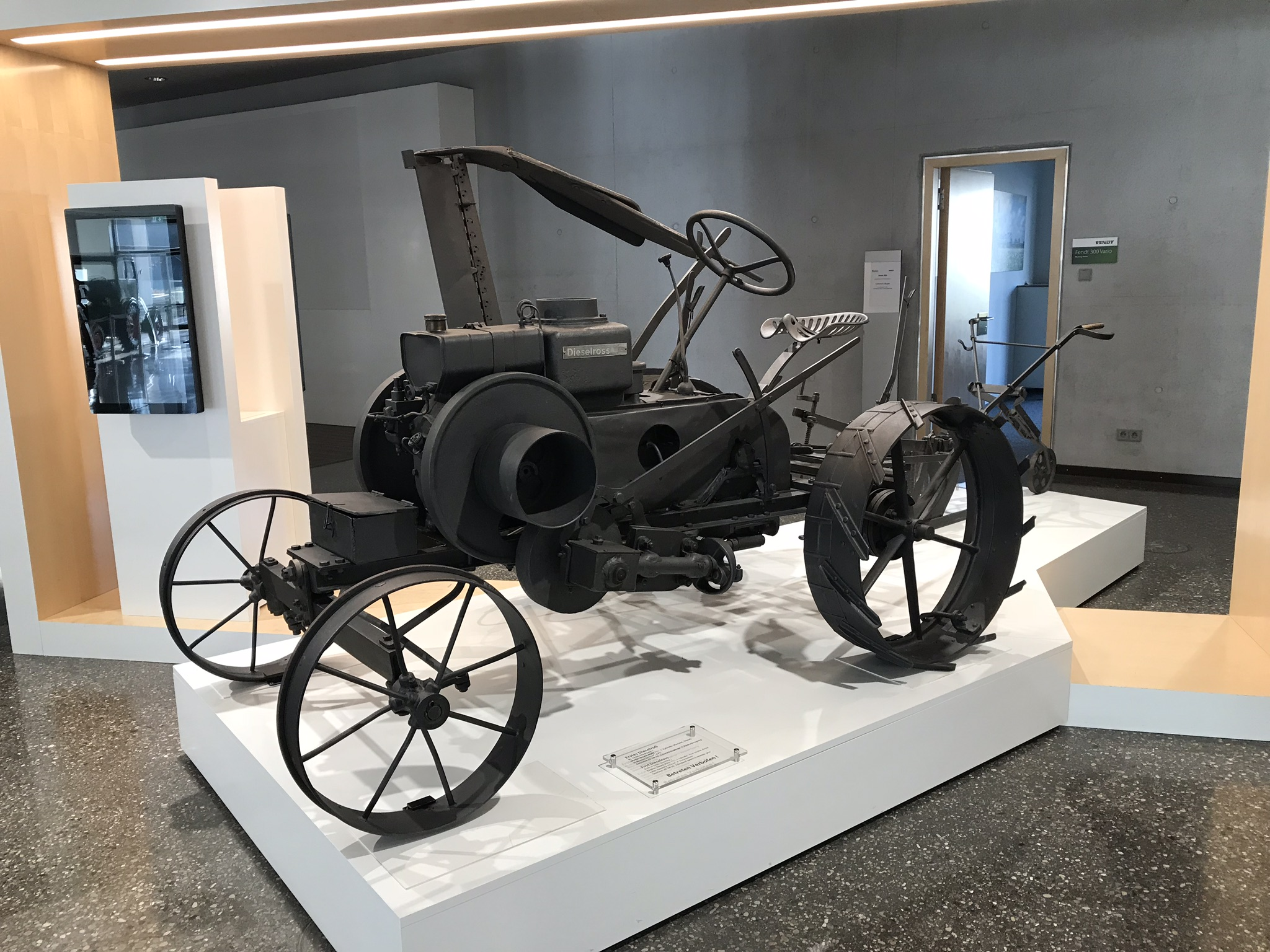
The first Fendt Dieselross powered by a 6 HP Deutz engine and on display at the company's Marktoberdorf tractor headquarters

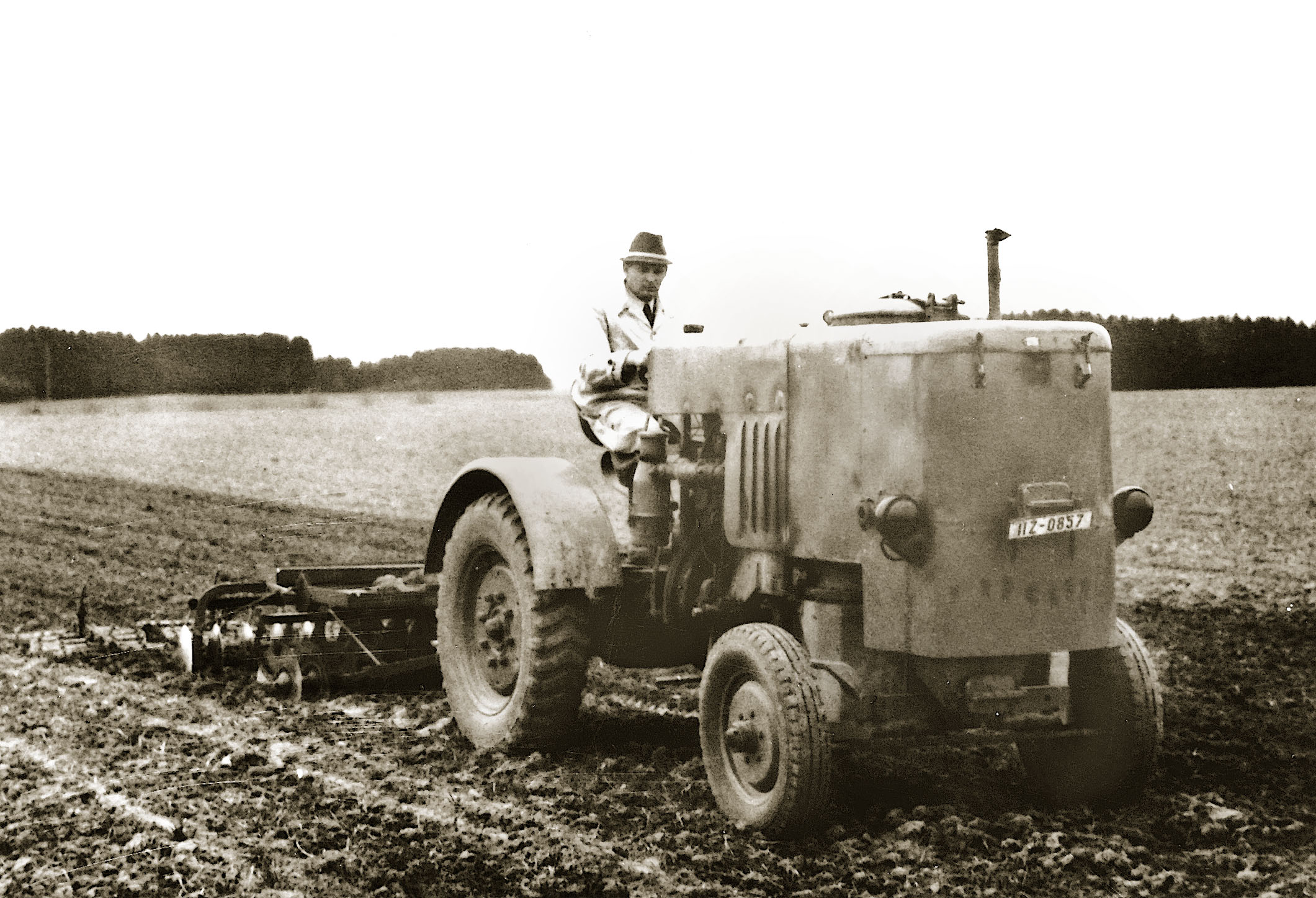
Xaver Fendt testing the G25 wood gas generator tractor

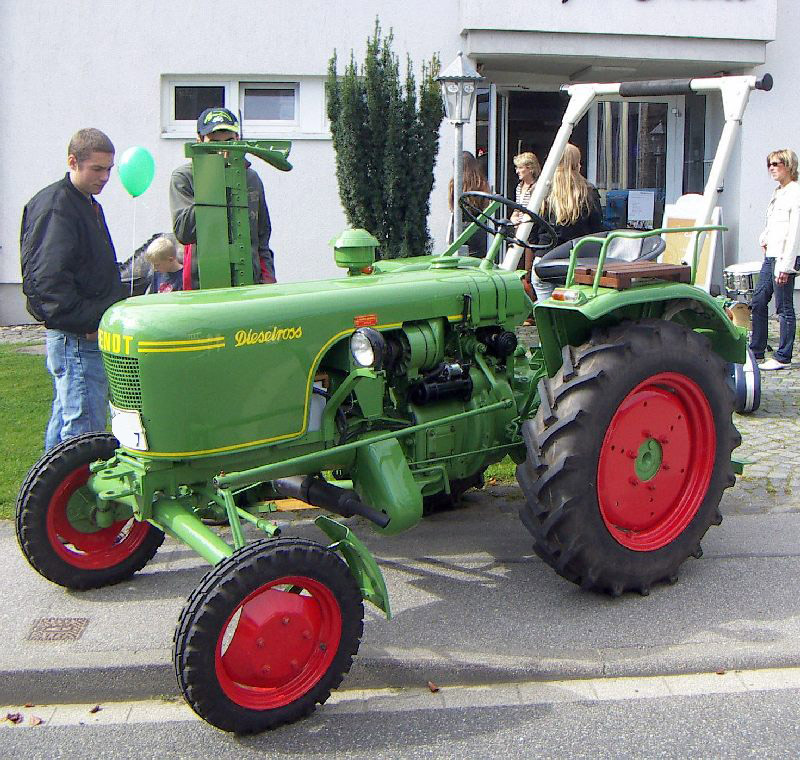
Fendt Dieselross produced in the 1950s

=== Company origins and history to 1950 ===
The craftsman family Fendt traces its history back some 350 years. The family became well known in Allgäu for producing tower clocks, lead strings and violins. The family also farmed as a sideline and had a small trade in agricultural equipment. Johann Georg Fendt (1868–1933) took over his father Franz Xaver's business in 1898 and began selling and servicing Deutz stationary engines.

Prior to 1928, Johann's oldest son Xaver (1907–1989) was employed at Deutz and BMW, while Hermann (1911–1995) continued to help their father operate the family farm and the engine business.

In 1928, Xaver returned home, and he, his brother Herman, and their father Johann extended their business into agricultural utility machines by building a motorized grass mower.

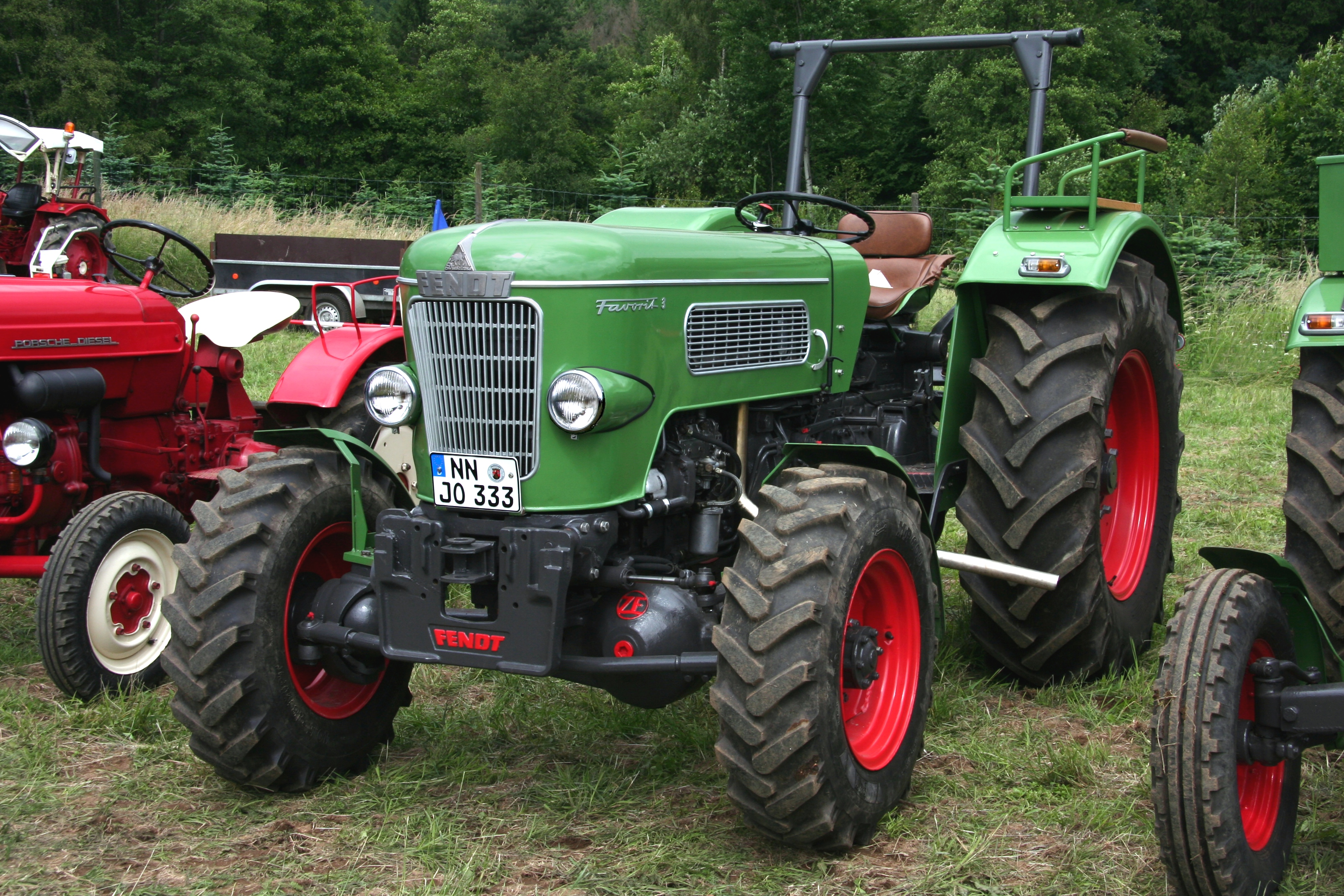
Fendt Favorite 3 produced in the 1960s

In 1930 they built their first 4.5 kW (6 hp) "Dieselross" tractor ("Ross" being the German word for a horse of quality as opposed to just an ordinary horse).

In 1937, the company was listed in the Kempten (Allgäu) commercial register under the name "Xaver Fendt & Co., Maschinen- und Schlepperfabrik". Xaver and Hermann became shareholders; their mother Kreszentia acted as a limited partner.

In 1938, the Fendt brothers built the Dieselross F 22 with up to 16 kW (22 hp); Dieselross tractors developed into a series that continued until 1958.

In 1942, the company faced great challenges as the Nazi government prohibited the construction of liquid-fuelled tractors as a result of the shortage of raw materials. In response, Fendt designed a wood gas tractor Dieselross G25, which had a standard generator and Deutz unit gas engine. They produced a total of 1,497 of these wood gas tractors between 1942 and 1949.

In 1948, the Fendt brothers were able to regain control of the company when they were established as trustees by the US military government that had been installed after World War II.

=== 1950s to 1970s ===
In 1950, production of the model F15 began, and the factory was producing 300 units per month. On 12 August 1950, the company produced its 10,000th tractor.

1955 saw the company produce its 50,000th unit.

In 1958 Fendt introduced their "ff" tractor series with the types Favorite, Farmer and Fix, offering engine power from 11 kW (15 hp) to 60 kW (80 hp). The Favorite 1 was trendsetting in transmission design and build.

Fendt's 100,000th tractor was produced in 1961; to represent that milestone, they selected a Farmer 2 tractor and painted it gold.

=== 1970s to the present ===
In 1970, Fendt created its first universal transporter loader wagon, the Agrobil S model. This year also marked the beginning of cabin production in Asbach-Bäumenheim, following the acquisition of Maschinenfabrik Josef Dechentreiter business unit there and the power of its 800 employees.

In 1980, a renaming to Fendt GmbH was enacted in order to meet the contemporary requirements for a commercial enterprise.

In 1985, Fendt achieved first place in the registration statistics for West Germany for the first time with 6,388 tractors sold and a market share of 18.4 percent.

In 1993, the 800 Series became the world's first tractor to feature a hydropneumatic suspended cab and front axle, providing premier comfort at its roading speed all the way up to 50 km/h.

In 1994, Fendt introduced the first mid-size tractor with a suspended front axle with the Favorite 500C.

In 1995, the company introduced its Vario Class, featuring innovative gearbox (transmission) technology, making, it the world's first large tractor with the stepless continuously variable transmission.

In 1996, the five heirs of Xaver and Hermann Fendt decided to sell the family business. At the end of January 1997, it transferred all shares of Fendt to AGCO. Since 1997, Fendt has operated as wholly owned brand of AGCO Corporation and its agricultural equipment reaches a global market.

In 2009, the Fendt 200 series was offered for the first time with a Vario transmission which cemented Fendt as the first and only brand of tractor globally that featured a continuously variable transmission throughout its entire tractor lineup; 70-360 hp.

In 2016, Fendt produced its 250,000th Vario transmission.

In 2018, Fendt had the largest share in the European tractor market. Fendt was the market leader by ownership in Germany with a share of 24.2% in 2018. In the annual image barometer published by the DLG, in which German contractors and farmers are surveyed about agricultural engineering companies, Fendt took first place in 2013 with 99.3 out of a possible 100 points.

CLIMMAR, an organization that publishes annual Dealer Satisfaction Index for nearly all Ag Equipment brands, has placed Fendt at an average measure of at least 14.1 in 8 of the last 10 years of survey (2011–2021) out of a maximum index of 15. The company is a member of the VDMA, Department of Agricultural Engineering.

As of 2022 Fendt showcases a product range that includes tractors, forage harvesters, combine harvesters, self-propelled sprayers, hay tools, row-crop planters, front end tractor loaders, and telescoping material handlers.

In August 2024, the company began production of the 600 Vario Gen1 which featured an AGCO Power CORE50 4-cylinder engine under their hood paired with the VarioDrive transmission.

In August 2025, the company announced the release of five new tractor models to the product lineup out of the Marktoberdorf factory. The new model lineup included the 300 Vario Gen5, the 500 Vario Gen4, the 700 Vario Gen7.1, the 800 Vario Gen5, and the 1000 Vario Gen4.

== Product range ==
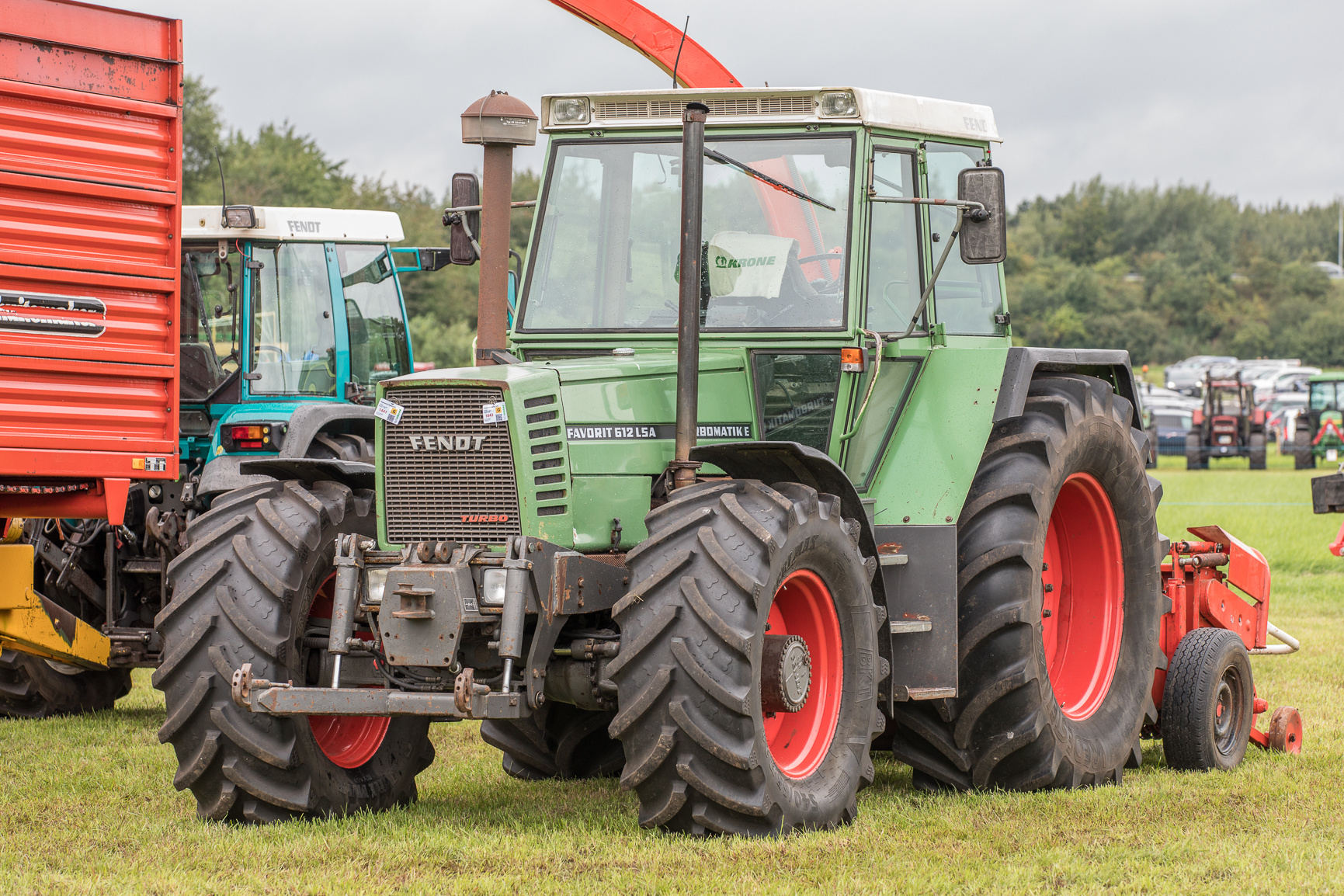
Fendt Favorite 612 LSA Turbomatik E, ca. 1990

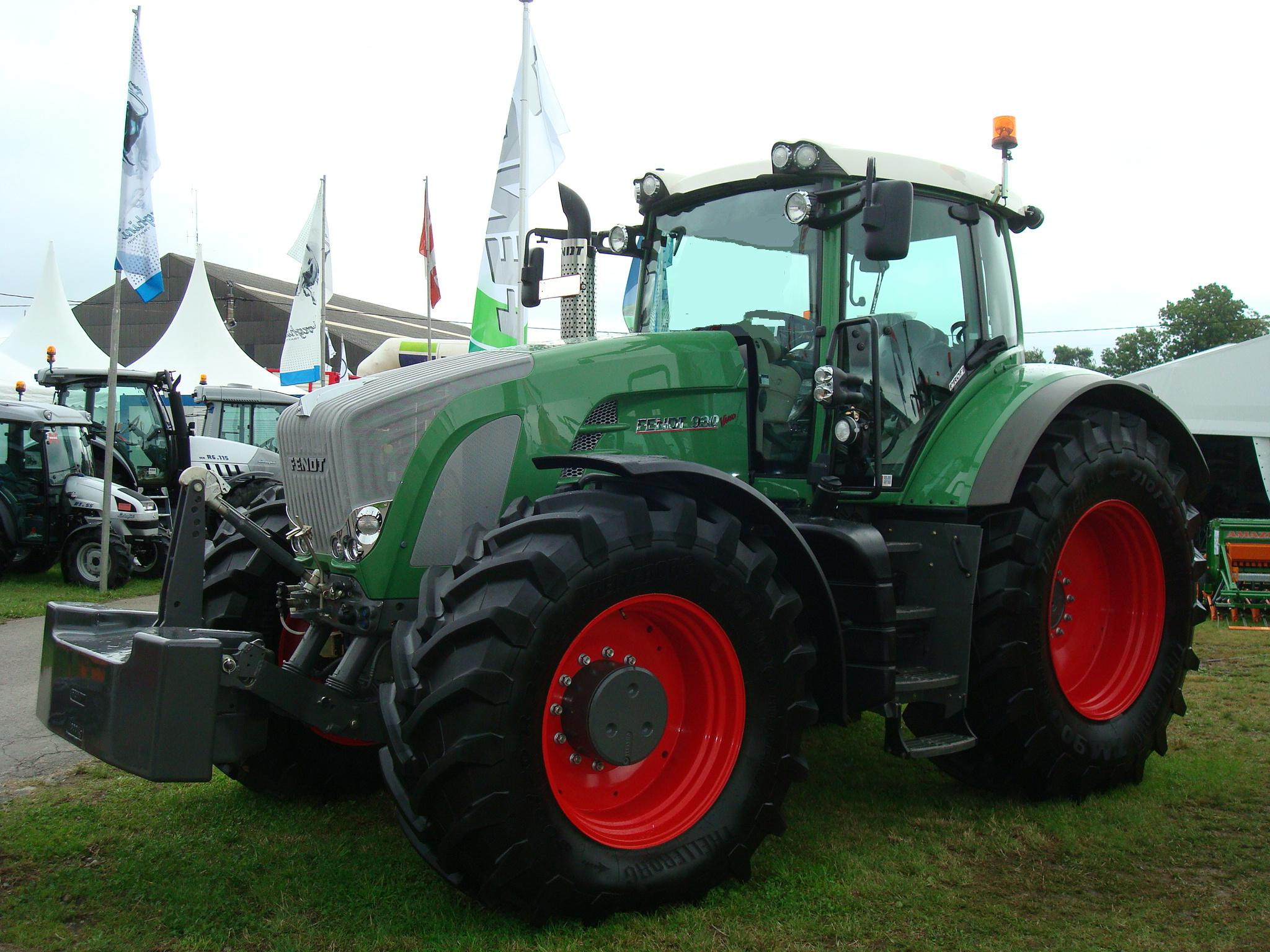
Fendt Vario 930

Fendt currently offers the following types of equipment:

- a range of tractors from 52–502 kW (70–673 hp), the majority of which are produced in Marktoberdorf, Bavaria, Germany, and two models in Jackson, Minnesota, USA.
- A range of combine harvesters ranging from 160–590 kW (220–790 hp), are produced in Breganze, Italy,.
- Forage equipment including forage wagons, tedders, mowers and rakes are badged under the Fendt brand after Fella was acquired by AGCO in 2011.
- Large Square Balers formerly Hesston branded, are now marketed under the Fendt brand since being acquired by AGCO.
- Planters for placement of row-crops

Finishing up the product line are:

- Forage harvesters 466–634 kW (625–850 hp) which use Kemper headers
- Self-Propelled Sprayers
- tractor-mounted loaders
- telescoping material handlers or tele-handlers
- and tractors modified for the municipalities and forestry sectors.

=== Tractors ===
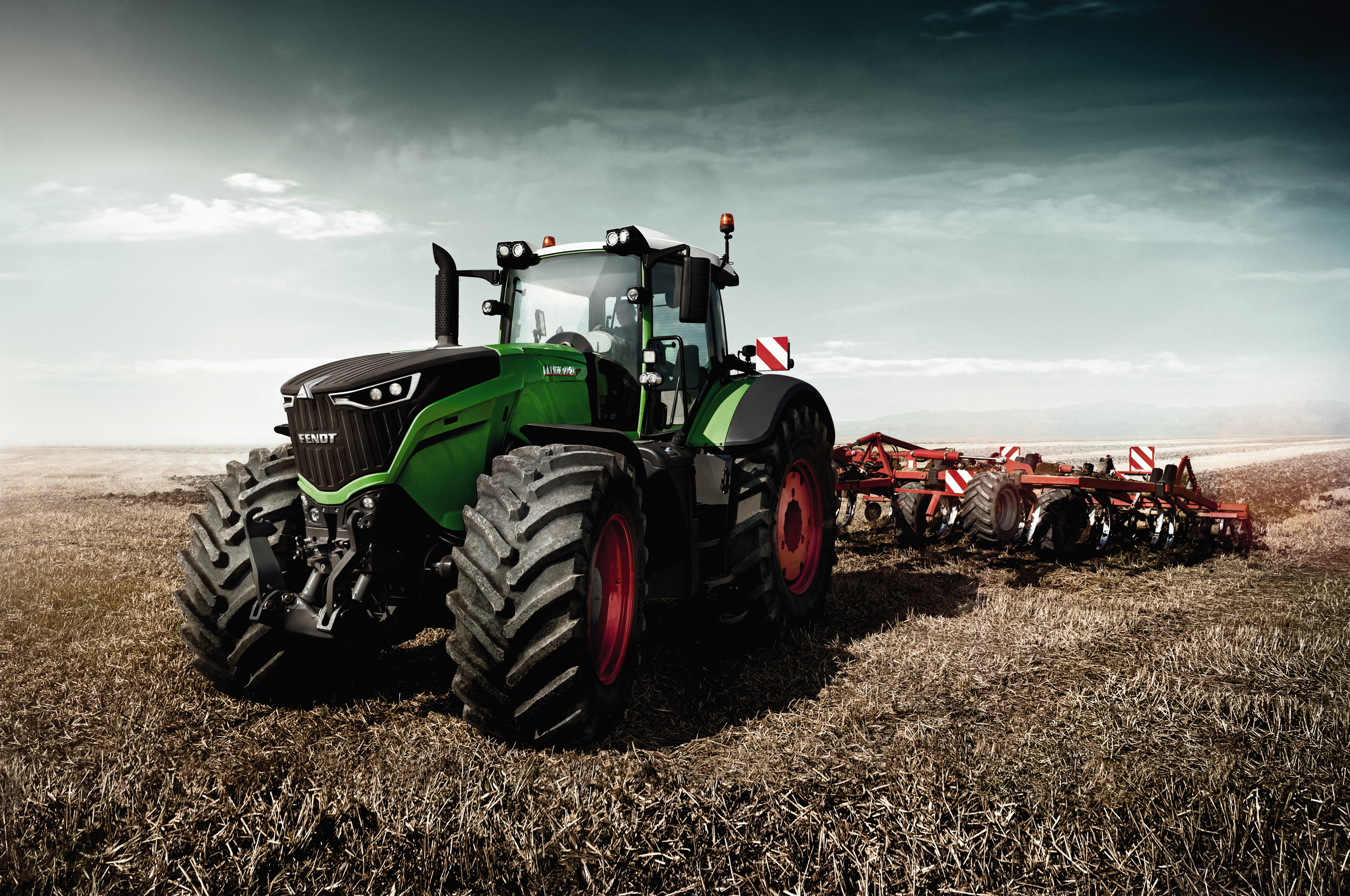
Fendt 1000 Vario with a Horsch cultivator

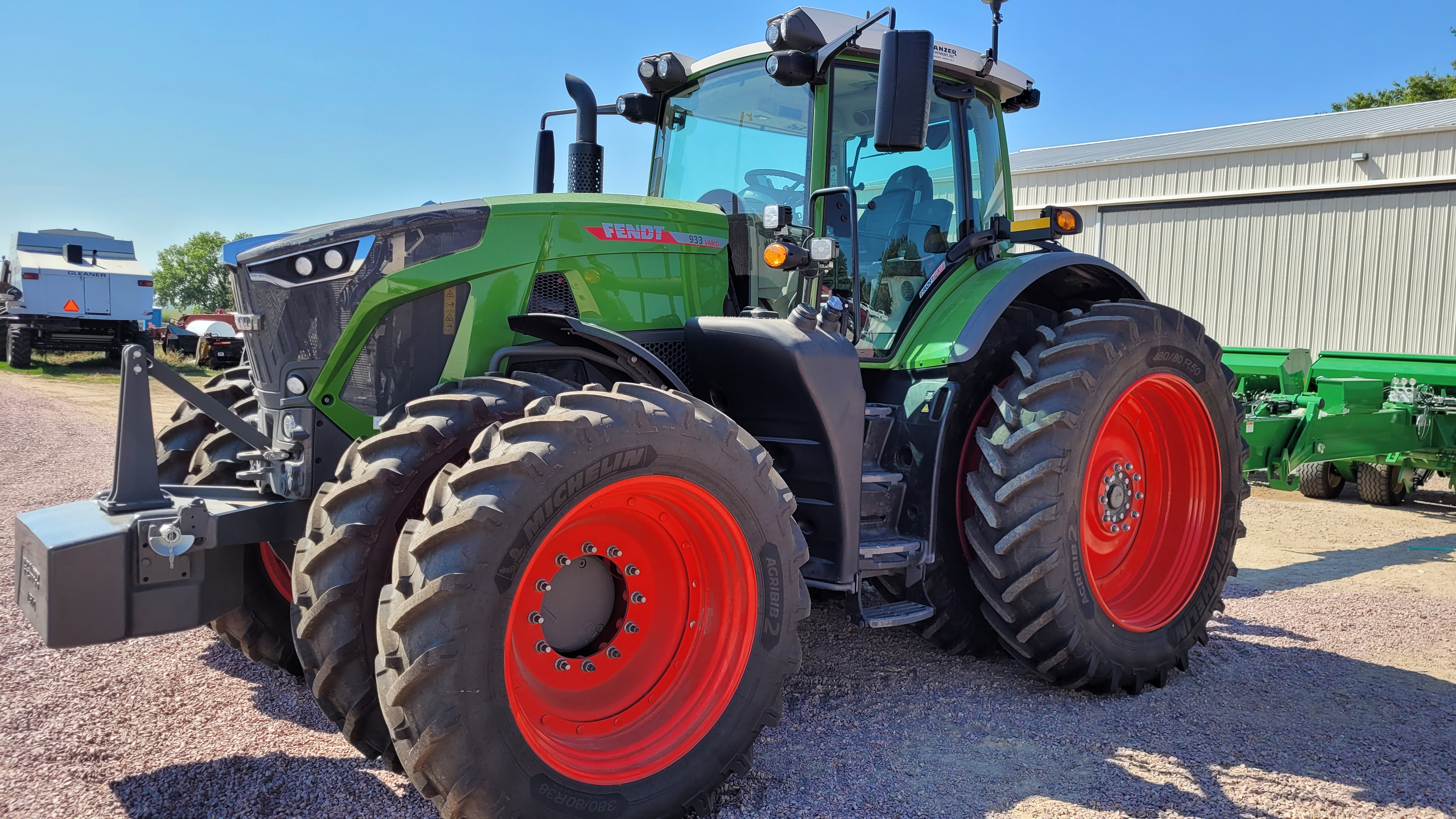
Fendt 933 Vario Gen6 Row Crop Tractor

| Range | Power range (kW/hp) | Manufacturing Location |
|---|---|---|
| 200 Vario Series | 51–81 / 70–110 | Marktoberdorf, Bavaria, Germany |
| 300 Vario Series | 83–112 / 113–152 | Marktoberdorf, Bavaria, Germany |
| 500 Vario Series | 106–128 / 144–174 | Marktoberdorf, Bavaria, Germany |
| 600 Vario Series | 121–165 / 164–224 | Marktoberdorf, Bavaria, Germany |
| 700 Vario Gen 6 Series | 106–174 / 130–240 | Marktoberdorf, Bavaria, Germany |
| 700 Vario Gen 7.1 Series | 164–223 / 223–303 | Marktoberdorf, Bavaria, Germany |
| 800 Vario Series | 208–252 / 283–343 | Marktoberdorf, Bavaria, Germany |
| 900 Vario Series | 202–308 / 275–420 | Marktoberdorf, Bavaria, Germany |
| 900 Vario MT Series | 283–321 / 380–430 | Jackson, Minnesota, USA |
| 1000 Vario Series | 313–405 / 426–550 | Marktoberdorf, Bavaria, Germany |
| 1100 Vario MT Series | 376-500 / 504–673 | Jackson, Minnesota, USA |

E100 Vario is a 75-kW / 100 hp. electric tractor. It can operate up to 10 hours under actual load.

=== Combines ===
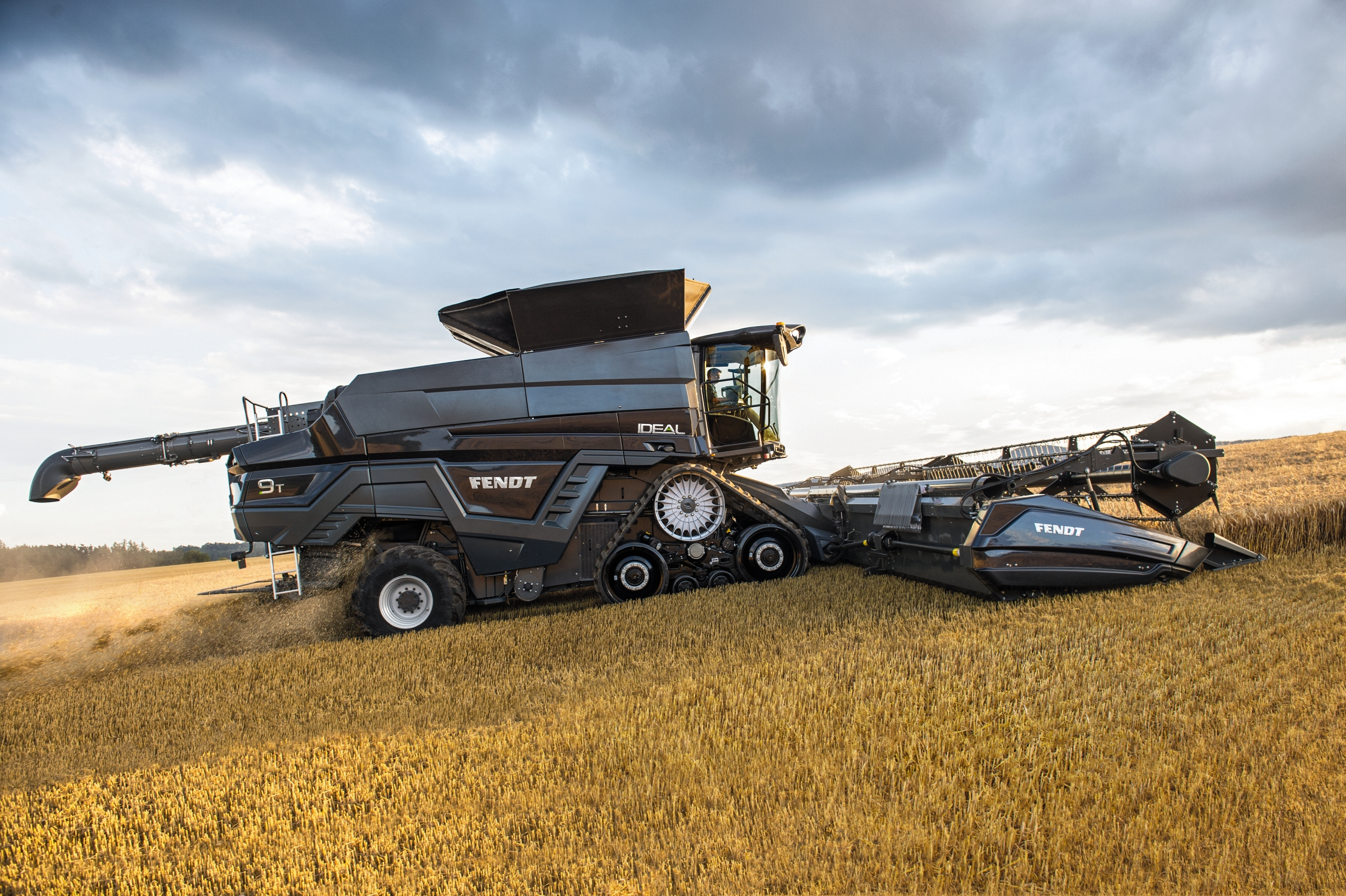
Fendt Ideal 9T

| Range | Power range | Thresher Type | Manufacturing Location |
|---|---|---|---|
| IDEAL | 355 kW / 476 hp 589 kW / 790 hp | Single and Double Axial Rotor Design | Breganze, Italy |
| C-Series | 225 kW / 306 hp 265 kW / 360 hp | Conventional Transverse Rotor | Breganze, Italy |
| L-Series | 179 kW / 243 hp 225 kW / 306 hp | Conventional Transverse Rotor | Breganze, Italy |
| CORUS 500 | 136 kW / 185 hp 166 kW / 226 hp 192 kW / 260 hp | Conventional Transverse Rotor | Breganze, Italy |

=== Large Square Balers ===
| Square Baler | Dimensions (cm/ft) | Manufacturing Location |
|---|---|---|
| 990 | 80 cm x 90 cm / 3 ft x 3 ft | Hesston, Kansas, USA |
| 1270 | 120 cm x 70 cm / 4 ft x 2 ft | Hesston, Kansas, USA |
| 1290 | 120 cm x 90 cm / 4 ft x 3 ft | Hesston, Kansas, USA |
| 1290 XD | 120 cm x 90 cm / 4 ft x 3 ft | Hesston, Kansas, USA |
| 12130 | 120 cm x 130 cm / 4 ft x 4 ft | Hesston, Kansas, USA |

=== Planters ===
| Range | Dimensions/Configuration | Manufacturing Location |
|---|---|---|
| Momentum 12 | 12 row 30 inch inter-row spacing OR 23 row 15 inch inter-row spacing | Ibirubá, Rio Grande do Sul, Brazil |
| Momentum 16 | 16 row 30 inch inter-row spacing | Beloit, Kansas, USA |
| Momentum 31 | 31 row 15 inch inter-row spacing OR 16 row 30 inch inter-row spacing | Beloit, Kansas, USA |
| Momentum 32 | 32 row 15 inch inter-row spacing OR 16 row 30 inch inter-row spacing | Beloit, Kansas, USA |
| Momentum 24 | 24 row 20 inch inter-row spacing | Beloit, Kansas, USA |
| Momentum 24 | 24 row 22 inch inter-row spacing | Beloit, Kansas, USA |
| Momentum 24 | 24 row 30 inch inter-row spacing | Beloit, Kansas, USA |
| Momentum 36 | 36 row 20 inch inter-row spacing | Beloit, Kansas, USA |
| Momentum 36 | 36 row 22 inch inter-row spacing | Beloit, Kansas, USA |
| Momentum 47 | 47 row 15 inch inter-row spacing OR 24 row 30 inch inter-row spacing | Beloit, Kansas, USA |
| Momentum 48 | 48 row 15 inch inter-row spacing OR 24 row 30 inch inter-row spacing | Beloit, Kansas, USA |

=== Forage Harvesters ===
| Range | Power (KW/hp) | Manufacturing Location |
|---|---|---|
| Fendt Katana 65 (2012–2019) | 460 kW / 625 hp | Hohenmölsen, Germany |
| Fendt Katana 650 (2020–present) | 478 kW / 650 hp | Hohenmölsen, Germany |
| Fendt Katana 85 (2012–2016) | 625 kW / 900 hp | Hohenmölsen, Germany |
| Fendt Katana 850 (2022–present) | 632 kW / 847 hp | Hohenmölsen, Germany |

=== Plant Protection Equipment ===
| Range | Power (KW/hp) | Nominal capacity (L/gal) | Liquid Boom widths (m/ft) | Manufacturing Location |
|---|---|---|---|---|
| RoGator 937/937H | 276 kW / 370 HP | 3411 - 6064 L / 900 - 1600 gal | 27.7 - 40.62 m / 90 –132 ft | Jackson, Minnesota, USA |
| RoGator 934/934H | 254 kW / 340 HP | 3411 - 6064 L / 900 - 1600 gal | 27.7 - 40.62 m / 90 –132 ft | Jackson, Minnesota, USA |
| RoGator 932 | 239 kW / 320 HP | 3411 - 4927 L / 900 - 1300 gal | 27.7 - 40.62 m / 90 –132 ft | Jackson, Minnesota, USA |
| 600 | 125-167 kW / 170-227 HP | 3850 - 6000 L / 1015 - 1583 gal | 24 – 36 m / 78 – 117 ft | Hohenmölsen, Germany |
| 300 | - | 3500 - 6930 L / 924 - 1829 gal | 24 – 30 m / 78 - 97.5 ft | Hohenmölsen, Germany |

=== Material Handling Equipment ===
| Range | Model | Continuous Lift Capacity (daN/lb-force) | Compatible Tractor Model | Manufacturing Location |
|---|---|---|---|---|
| Fendt Cargo Loaders (for tractors) | Cargo 3X/65 | 1680 daN / 3775 lb-force | Fendt 200 | Marktoberdorf, Bavaria, Germany |
| | Cargo 3X/70 | 2000 daN / 4495 lb-force | Fendt 300 | Marktoberdorf, Bavaria, Germany |
| | Cargo 4X/75 | 1940 daN / 4360 lb-force | Fendt 300 and Fendt 500 | Marktoberdorf, Bavaria, Germany |
| | Cargo 4X/80 | 2260 daN / 5080 lb-force | Fendt 500 | Marktoberdorf, Bavaria, Germany |
| | Cargo 4X/85 | 2600 daN / 5845 lb-force | Fendt 600 or 700 | Marktoberdorf, Bavaria, Germany |
| | Cargo 5X/85 | 2600 daN / 5845 lb-force | Fendt 600 or 700 | Marktoberdorf, Bavaria, Germany |
| | Cargo 5X/90 | 2950 daN / 6630 lb-force | Fendt 600 or 700 | Marktoberdorf, Bavaria, Germany |
| | Cargo Pro 6.100 | 4070 daN / 9119 lb-force | Fendt 700 Gen 7 | Marktoberdorf, Bavaria, Germany |
| Fendt Cargo Telehandler | T740 | 6500 daN / 14610 lb-force | n/a | Straubing, Bavaria, Germany |
| Fendt Cargo Telehandler | T955 | 8500 daN / 19100 lb-force | n/a | Straubing, Bavaria, Germany |

== Technology ==
=== Vario Transmission ===
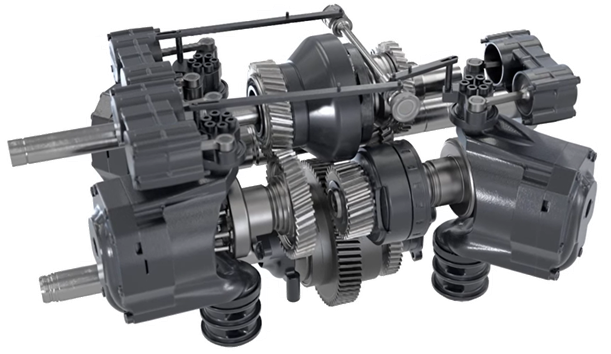
Internal view of TA400 Vario Transmission

The Vario transmission was first developed in the 1970s, but due to excessive noise of the hydraulic portion of the transmission and lack of engineering production methods that had not yet been invented, it was not seen on a production tractor until 1995, when Fendt launched the revolutionary Fendt 926 Vario. This was the first ever stepless transmission to be launched in the tractor market, and is patented to be the only truly stepless transmission when it was first developed. Competitors were unable to make a transmission as advanced as a Fendt Vario at the time with a hydrostatic transmission as the only real competition, however, these soon fell out of favor. Since its initial announcement and release, manufacturers such as ZF, John Deere and CNH group have also developed their own versions of this type of transmission.

Fendt's infinitely variable transmission (IVT) differs from a continuously variable transmission (CVT) as an IVT can be traveling at 0.0 km/h whilst the transmission is engaged and not in neutral. The IVT/CVT gearbox is widely regarded as one of the most fuel-efficient gearbox types on the agricultural market prompting nearly all other major manufacturers to develop their own system as it is able to combine more precise ground speed selection by the user with an increase in fuel-efficiency.

Variations can be found on other AGCO tractor brands such as Massey Ferguson. The gearbox may be the same however the individual brands have different controls/ joysticks and may have different ECU software.

The first generation of Vario transmissions were named for their primary inventor, Hans Marschall and the different classes of the transmission were labeled in honor of him using the format of "MLxxx" where the x characters would indicate how many kilowatts of power could be transferred through the transmission. (i.e., the original Fendt 926 Favorite Vario featured an ML200 Vario Transmission which could transfer 200 kW or 268 maximum horsepower through it)

=== Tractor Management System ===
In 2004, following the paradigm-shift of the Vario transmission, the next large innovation that Fendt delivered was the ability for the tractor gearbox/transmission and the engine to communicate with one another based on parameters set by the operator that allowed the machine to command only as much engine power as needed to complete the commanded task; a concept that was branded as Vario TMS or Tractor Management System.

=== VarioGrip ===
Fendt pioneered the idea and implementation of the first tire pressure monitoring and control system for use on an agricultural tractor. It was developed in the late 1980s and first released in an open-loop feedback system offering in 2015 on the Fendt 800, 900, and 1000 Vario Series tractors.

=== Fendt iD Low Engine Speed Concept ===
Beginning with the 1000 series tractor in 2015, Fendt created and implemented the use of the low engine speed concept which was also a world-first for any size agricultural tractor. While most diesel tractor engines operate at a rated engine RPM of 2000–2300, Fendt engineered the machine to work at its optimum between 1100 and 1500 RPM with a max RPM of 1730. The results from this innovation resulted in lower fluid consumption, longer service intervals, and longer overall machine life due to less component wear. With the success of Fendt iD on the 1000 series, it is also now utilized on the 900 Vario Gen 6 and newer series, the 900 Vario MT series, the 1100 Vario MT series, and the 700 Vario Gen 7 and newer series.

=== The Trisix ===
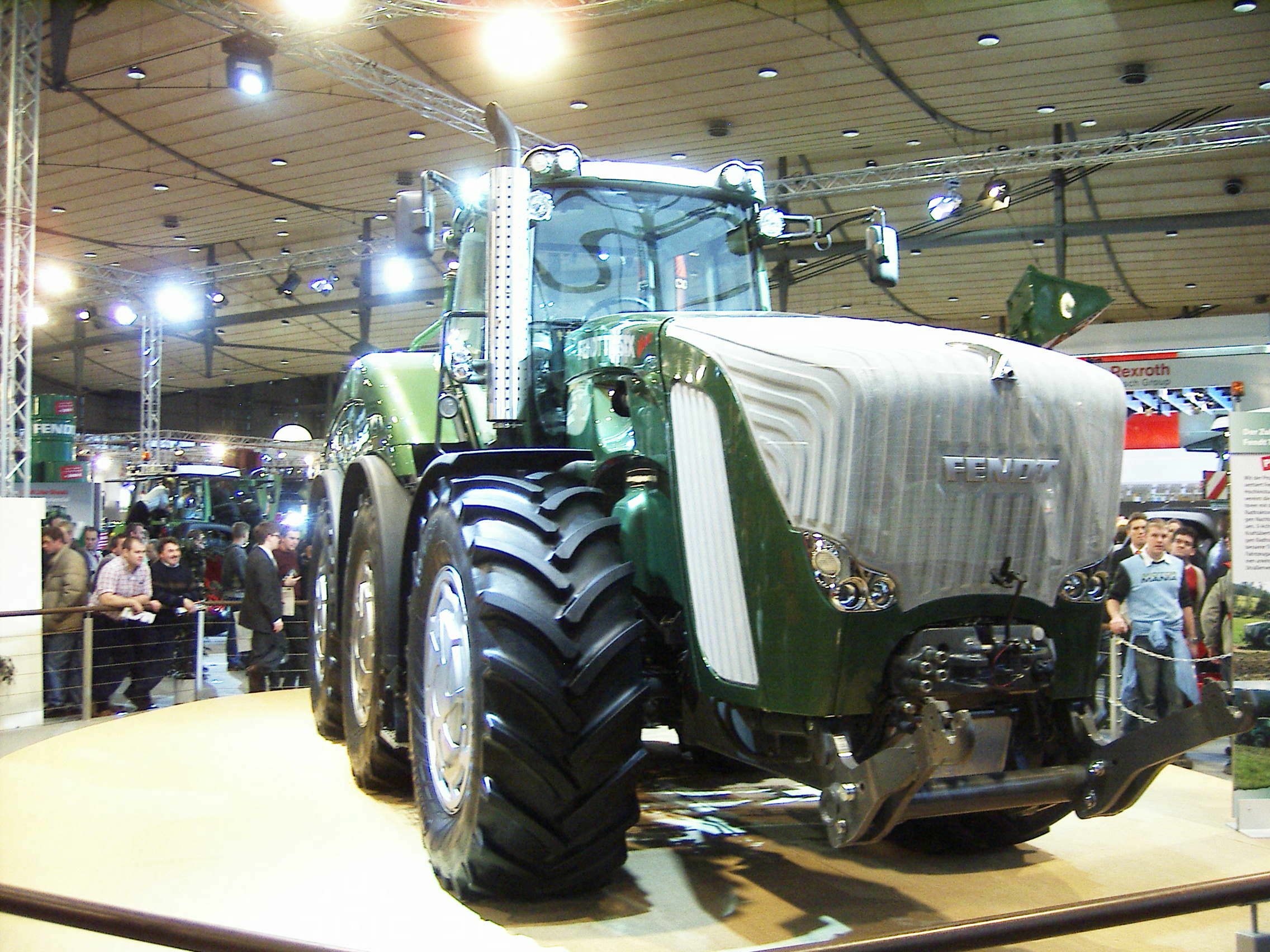
Fendt TriSix on display at Agritechnica 2007

Fendt released a prototype of a new concept tractor at Agritechnica 2007, in Hanover, Germany, called the TriSix nicknamed "Mobydick" and boasting 400 kW (540 hp) and six-wheel drive.

The front axle and the rearmost steer the tractor, and as the speed of the tractor increases, the amount of steering input on the rear axle reduces to make it safer. It also completely locks out when in transport mode and with some implements.

To handle the horsepower the Trisix has two of the company's trademark Vario transmissions, which push the machine up to a top speed of 60 km/h (38 mph). Fendt has not confirmed the production of this machine, and it remains in the prototype stage. The axles and backbone tube are from Tatra 815 series trucks and the 6x6 Tatra-based tractor concept was patented in 1997 by Farma Josef Dvorak of Tábor, Czech Republic.

== Appearances in media ==
A Fendt 930 Vario was shown on BBC's Top Gear, where host James May chose a 930 Vario. It was driven by The Stig round the Top Gear Test Track, and did a time of 3:28.4, the second slowest time round the track. The Fendt 930 Vario does however report a top speed of 37.5 mph, much faster compared to similar competitor's tractors.

The Fendt 716 also appeared on BBC1 Scotland, on the program Countryfile, where world-class Fendt Driver, Steven Brown, of Inverdovat Farm, won the annual Scottish Fendt Ploughing Match, receiving a prize of £5,000.

In 2022, a collaboration between musicians Troglauer and Die Draufgänger produced the song "Fendt (Layla)" praising the tractor in the song lyrics and featured a 1000 Series tractor in its music video.

Fendt tractors have appeared in the widely-popular Farming Simulator 2008, Farming Simulator 2009, Farming Simulator 17, Farming Simulator 19, Farming Simulator 22 and Farming Simulator 25 games.

== See also ==
- Deutz-Fahr
- Fendt Caravan (formerly a part of Fendt)
- Hanomag
