= NCIS =

NCIS or N.C.I.S. may refer to:

== Law enforcement ==
- National Criminal Intelligence Service, the predecessor to the Serious Organised Crime Agency of the UK
- Naval Criminal Investigative Service, a US law enforcement and intelligence agency that primarily investigates crimes in the U.S. Navy and Marine Corps
- National Criminal Investigation Service (Kripos), a special agency of the Norwegian Police Service

== Television ==
- NCIS (franchise)
  - NCIS (TV series), since 2003, a US television show about a group of fictional agents of the Naval Criminal Investigative Service based in Washington, D.C.
    - NCIS (soundtrack), four soundtracks of music featured on the original NCIS TV series
  - NCIS: Los Angeles, a 2009 spin-off from NCIS, a show about fictional undercover NCIS Office of Special Projects agents based in Los Angeles
  - NCIS: New Orleans, a 2014 second spin-off from NCIS, a show about fictional NCIS agents based in New Orleans
  - NCIS: Hawaiʻi, a 2021 third spin-off from NCIS, a show about fictional NCIS agents based in Hawaii
  - NCIS: Sydney, a 2023 fourth spin-off from NCIS, a show about fictional NCIS agents and Australian Federal Police based in Sydney, Australia
  - NCIS: Origins, a 2024 fifth spin-off from NCIS, a prequel show about original protagonist Leroy Jethro Gibbs, a fictional NCIS agent, in his early years
  - NCIS: Tony & Ziva, a 2025 sixth spin-off from NCIS, this series reunites Tony DiNozzo and Ziva David and centers on the events that shaped their storyline in Europe
  - NCIS: New York, a 2026 seventh spin-off from NCIS, this series has Sam Hannah returning to New York, after appearing for 14 Seasons on NCIS: Los Angeles and recurring on NCIS and NCIS: Hawaiʻi

== Other uses ==
- National Coalition of Independent Scholars
- NATO Common Interoperability Standards
- Nothing's Carved in Stone, a Japanese rock band formed in 2009

== See also ==
- National Crime Information Center (NCIC)
- NSIS (disambiguation)
- JAG (disambiguation)
