= Jaguares =

Jaguares can be:

- Jaguares (band), a Mexican rock band
- Jaguares (Super Rugby), an Argentine rugby union team
- Chiapas F.C., a Mexican professional football club
- Jaguares de Tapachula, the feeder team of Mexican football club Chiapas F.C.
- Jaguares de Tabasco
- Jaguares de Zamora

== See also ==
- Jaguar (disambiguation)
- JAGS (disambiguation)
- JAG (disambiguation)
