= Jaguar (disambiguation) =

A jaguar is a large cat native to South and Central America.

Jaguar may also refer to:

== Transportation ==
- Jaguar Cars
- UAZ Jaguar
- Armstrong Siddeley Jaguar, an aircraft engine
- SS Empire Ballad, a Panamanian steamship built in 1941 and renamed SS Jaguar in 1962

== Cartoons and comics ==
- Jaguar (Insurgent Comix), a superheroine
- Jaguar (Archie Comics), a comics character
- Jaguar (cartoonist), pseudonym of Brazilian cartoonist Sérgio Jaguaribe (1932–2025)
- Jaguar, a Belgian comic series by Jan Bosschaert

== Music ==
=== People ===
- Jaguar (Jaguar Bingham, active beginning 2010s), British DJ
- Jaguar (musician) (active 2000s), Kenyan musician and politician

=== Bands ===
- Jaguar (band), an English metal band
- Jagúar (band), an Icelandic funk band
- The Jaguars, an American doo-wop group known for their 1956 cover of "The Way You Look Tonight"
- The Jaguars, a 1960s Japanese band whose song "Dancing Lonely Night" was used on the British TV series Banzai

=== Other uses in music ===
- Fender Jaguar, a guitar introduced in 1962
- "Jaguar", a 2015 Punjabi song by Sukh-E, Jaani, and Bohemia
- "Knights of the Jaguar", often shortened as "Jaguar", a techno song by DJ Rolando
- Jaguar (EP), 2020, by pop singer Victoria Monét

== Film ==
- Jaguar (1967 film), a French ethnographic film
- Jaguar (1979 film), a Filipino crime drama
- Jaguar (1994 film), a Greek drama
- Le Jaguar, a 1996 French adventure comedy
- Jaguar (2016 film), an Indian action film

== Science and technology ==
- Atari Jaguar, a game console
- Jaguar (supercomputer), built by Cray, became operational in 2005
- Jaguar (microarchitecture), a CPU design
- Jaguar (British rocket), a research rocket
- Jaguar (American rocket), a sounding rocket
- Jaguar (software), for computational chemistry
- Jaguar, the marketing name for the Mac OS X 10.2 operating system
- Jaguar (Hewlett-Packard), a code name for the HP 95LX palmtop PC
- Claas Jaguar, a forage harvester

== Sports ==
- Jaguar Yokota (born 1961), Japanese wrestler
- Hisakatsu Oya (born 1964), Japanese wrestler
- Argentina Jaguars, an Argentine secondary national rugby team
- Associação Desportiva Jaboatão dos Guararapes, a Brazilian association football team, known as Jaguar
- Chiapas F.C., a Mexican association football team, also known as Chiapas Jaguar
- IUPUI Jaguars, the sports teams of Indiana University – Purdue University Indianapolis
- Jacksonville Jaguars, an American professional football team
- Jaguar Racing (disambiguation), either of two automobile racing teams
- South Alabama Jaguars, the sports teams of the University of South Alabama
- South American Jaguars, an international rugby team active in the 1980s
- Southern Jaguars and Lady Jaguars, the sports teams of Southern University and A&M College
- UHV Jaguars, the sports teams of the University of Houston–Victoria
- USJ-R Jaguars, the sports teams of the University of San Jose–Recoletos

== Military and weapons ==
- HMS Jaguar (F34), a Royal Navy destroyer sunk in the Second World War
- HMS Jaguar (F37), a Royal Navy destroyer launched in 1957 and sold to the Bangladeshi Navy in 1978
- French destroyer Jaguar (1922–1940), a Chacal-class destroyer
- Jaguar class fast attack craft, a German S-boat
- USS Jaguar (IX-120), a US Navy World War II tanker
- Jaguar 1, a German tank destroyer
- Jaguar 2, a German tank destroyer
- SEPECAT Jaguar, a military aircraft
- Grumman XF10F Jaguar, a cancelled prototype military aircraft first flown in 1952
- Beretta 70 "Jaguar", a hand gun model
- EBRC Jaguar, a French armoured reconnaissance vehicle

== Other uses ==
- Jaguar (beverage), an alcoholic energy drink
- Jaguar!, a roller coaster at Knott's Berry Farm
- Jaguar (novel), by Roland Smith

== See also ==
- Jaguar warrior an elite member of the Aztec military
- Jaguarundi
- Jaguares (disambiguation)
- JAGS (disambiguation)
- JAG (disambiguation)
