= Jaguar II =

Jaguar II may refer to:

- Jaguar Mark II, a saloon car from UK carmaker Jaguar Cars
- Jaguar 2 (RakJPz.4), a Cold War era West German tank destroyer
- Jaguar II, an aero engine from Armstrong Siddeley, see Armstrong Siddeley Jaguar
- Jaguar II (album), a 2023 album by Victoria Monét

== See also ==
- Jaguar (disambiguation)
- II (disambiguation)
- 2 (disambiguation)
