= NSIS =

NSIS may refer to:

== Technology ==
- National Sheep Identification System, the implementation in Ireland for the identification and registration of ovine and caprine animals
- Network Store Interface Service, a Microsoft Windows service
- Next Steps in Signaling, a former Internet Engineering Task Force working group
- Nullsoft Scriptable Install System, a script-driven Windows installation system
- Nova Scotian Institute of Science, a membership organization promoting science in Nova Scotia

== Other uses ==
- National Strategy for Information Sharing, part of Nationwide Suspicious Activity Reporting Initiative
- National Security Intelligence Section, of Ireland's Directorate of Military Intelligence
- Nova Scotian Institute of Science Nova Scotian Institute of Science
