= Fendt 700 Vario =

Series of tractors made by Fendt

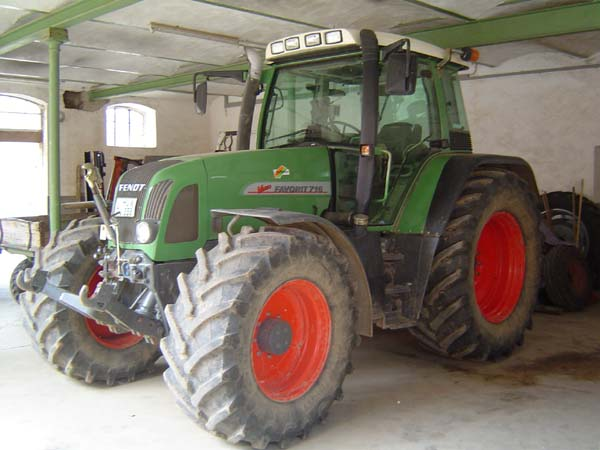
- Fendt Favorit 716 Vario
- Manufacturer: Fendt
- Production: 1998 - present
- Engine model: 6-cylinder Deutz, from 2022: AGCO Power
- Speed: 60 km/h

Fendt 700 Vario is a series of tractors made by the manufacturer of agricultural machinery, Fendt. Since the introduction of the first 700 Vario model in 1989, seven generations of the series have been released. The 700 Vario is the manufacturer's best-selling tractor series. The latest generation, the Fendt 700 Vario Gen7, has been available on the market since the summer of 2022.

== Series ==
The 700 Vario series debuted on 30 August 1998. It featured the brand-new ML 180 continuously variable transmission and won the “Tractor of the Year 1999″ award. Among the larger Fendt models, 800 Vario to 1100 Vario MT and the compact machines of the 200 Vario, 300 Vario and 500 Vario series, the 700 Vario is considered particularly versatile. The series is the best-selling model of Fendt and the most popular tractor in Germany.

Since its official presentation in 1998, the drive, technology and equipment of the Fendt 700 Vario have been consistently further developed. In total, there are seven generations of the series. Each generation includes four to six different models, which mainly differ in performance and horsepower. Currently, the 700 Vario Gen6 models and the tractors of the latest generation 700 Vario Gen7 are still being produced. Due to their durability and long lifespan, older Fendt 700 generations are still available as used machines on the market.

Fendt pursues the approach of combining a user-friendly operation with a range of functions with the 700 Vario series. The operating system, Variotronic, which was introduced with the first 700 Vario generation in 1998, has been awarded internationally.

Since 2011, all tractors of the fourth generation have been equipped with Fendt Efficient Technology (FET) and the VisioPlus cab for safe and comfortable work. In 2020, the FendtOne operating system was introduced with the sixth generation. In response to global demand, the available track widths of the tractor models have been adjusted. Also, all Fendt 700 Vario models currently built comply with the European exhaust emission standard stage V. On July 25, 2024, the 100,000th Fendt 700 Vario rolled off the production line in Marktoberdorf, proving the success of the tractor series.

== Generations and Models ==
Generation	Year of release	Models	Power Range	Features
700 Vario Gen1	1998	Favorit 711 Vario; Favorit 712 Vario; Favorit 714 Vario; Favorit 716 Vario	116–160 HP	Award for Variotronic control system
700 Vario Gen2	2003	711 Vario; 712 Vario; 714 Vario; 716 Vario	85–118 kW; 115–160 HP	Introduction of the Vario Tractor Management System (TMS)
700 Vario Gen3	2006	712 Vario; 714 Vario; 716 Vario; 718 Vario	85–121 kW; 115–165 HP	Integration of a new engine; Introduction of 718 Vario
700 Vario Gen4	2011	720 Vario; 722 Vario; 724 Vario	136–162 kW; 185–220 HP	Introduction of the VisioPlus cab Introduction of Fendt Effective Technology (FET)
700 Vario Gen5	2014	714 Vario; 716 Vario; 718 Vario; 720 Vario; 722 Vario; 724 Vario	106–174 kW; 144–237 HP	The air-based brake system as standard
700 Vario Gen6	2020	714 Vario; 716 Vario; 718 Vario; 720 Vario; 722 Vario; 724 Vario	106–174 kW; 144–237 HP	Introduction of FendtONE control
700 Vario Gen7	2022	720 Vario Gen7; 722 Vario Gen7; 724 Vario Gen7; 726 Vario Gen7; 728 Vario Gen7	149–221 kW; 203–303 HP	New AGCO Power engine Optional 60-inch track width FendtONE onboard and offboard Speed up to 60 km/h

== The latest generation ==
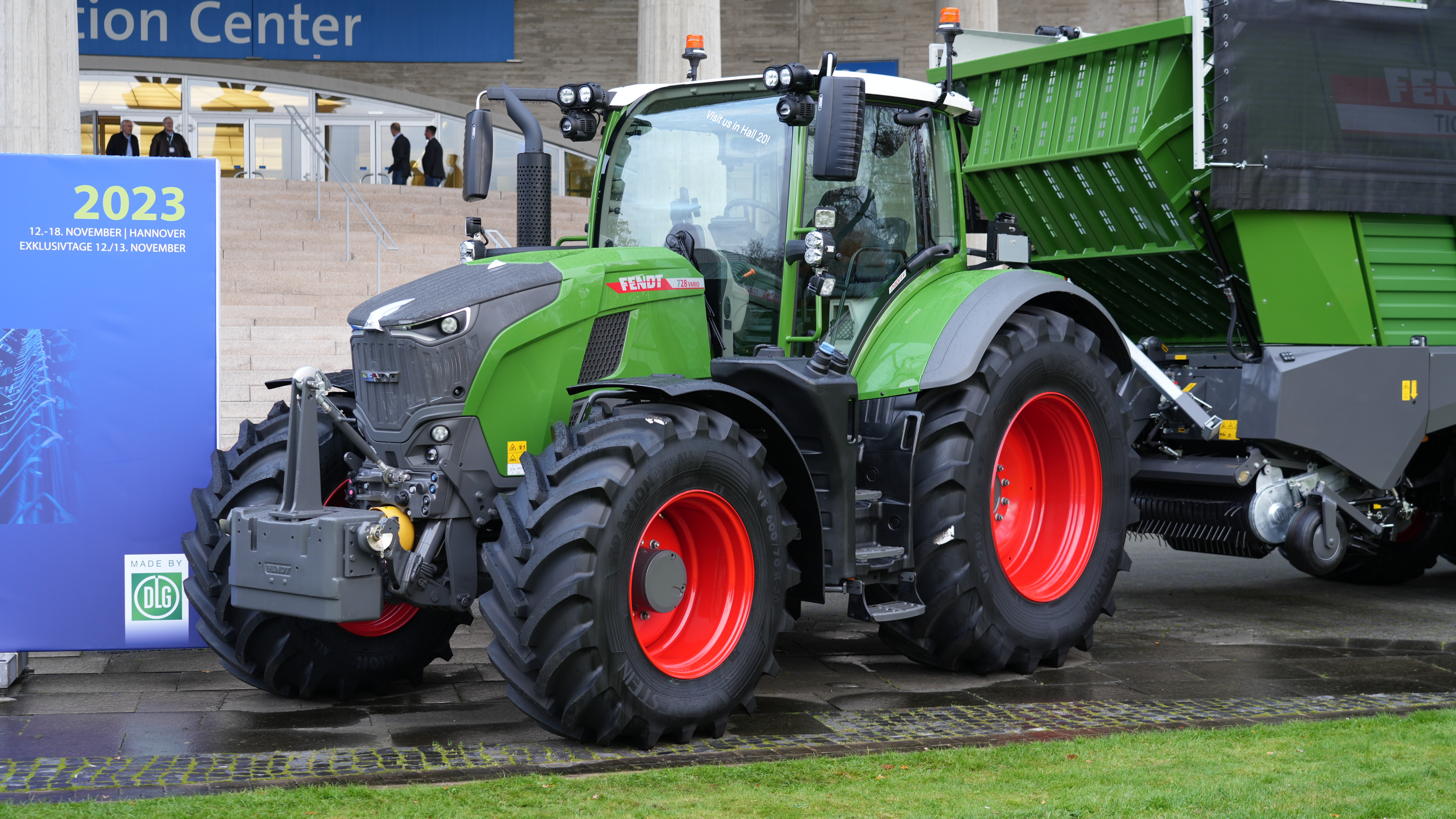
Fendt 728 Vario Gen7

The seventh generation series includes five models (720, 722, 724, 726 and 728 Vario) with a power range of 149 – 208 kW and 203 - 303 HP. As with previous generations, the focus of the Gen7 is a low power-to-weight ratio and high-performance range—however, the new models have been visually and technically overhauled. For the first time, a Deutz engine was not used, but a 6-cylinder engine by AGCO Power with 7.5 litres of displacement and 1,220 Nm. The fans, transmission and drive have also been renewed in the Gen7 models. The Fendt VarioDrive drive for automatic shifting of the driving ranges from the 1000 Vario series has now been integrated into the new 700 Vario models.

The compact cooling unit with the Concentric Air System (CAS) cooling concept is a new feature. The slim design allows for a large steering angle and makes the Fendt 700 Vario Gen7 particularly manoeuvrable. All models also have integrated hood and rear cameras as well as the integrated safety concept Fendt Stability Control, which reduces side inclination and swaying even with heavy loads. In addition, there is an integrated tire pressure control VarioGrip. From late 2023, the Fendt 700 Vario Gen7 will be optionally available with a new trailer brake assistant.

== Gallery ==
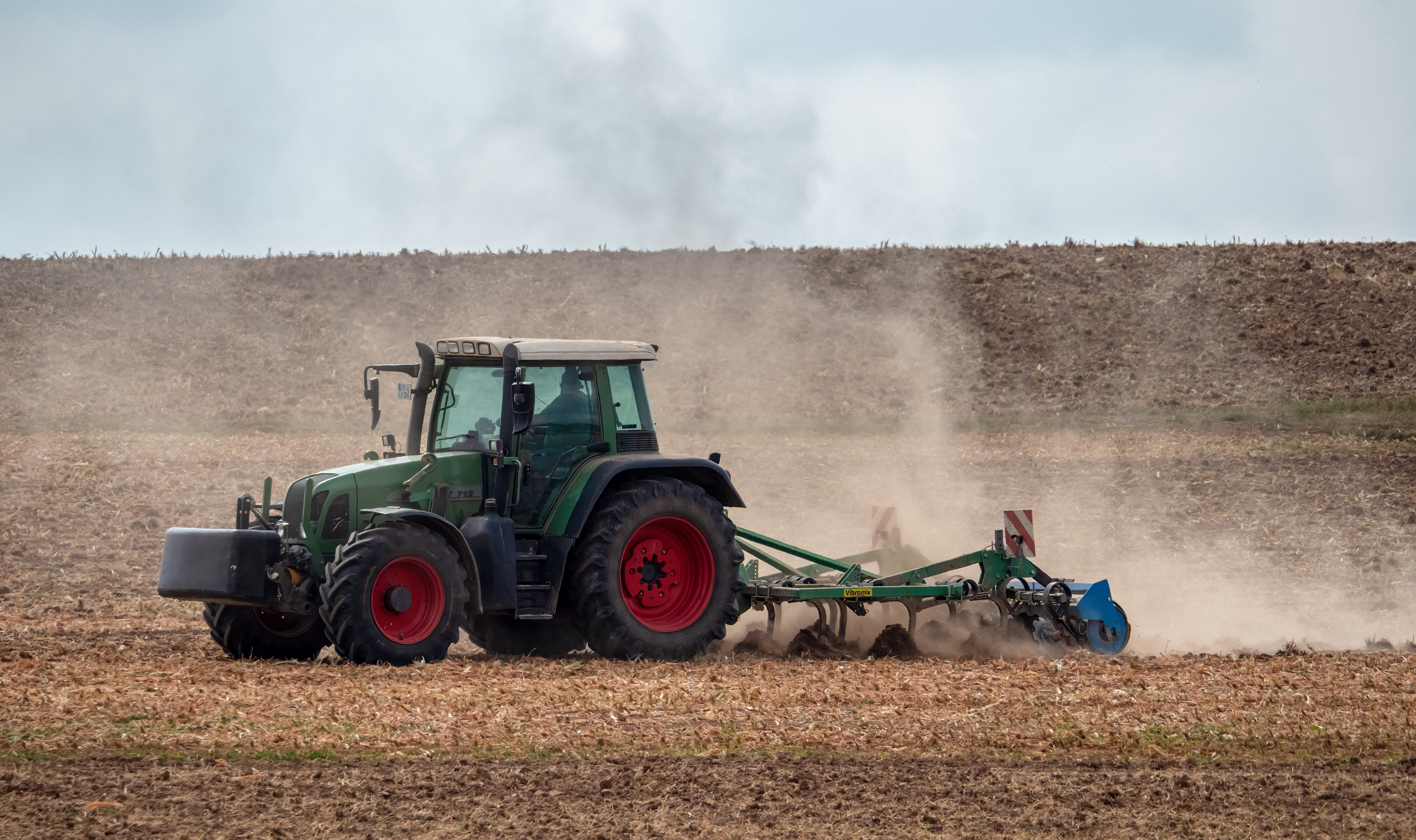
Fendt 700 Vario Gen1

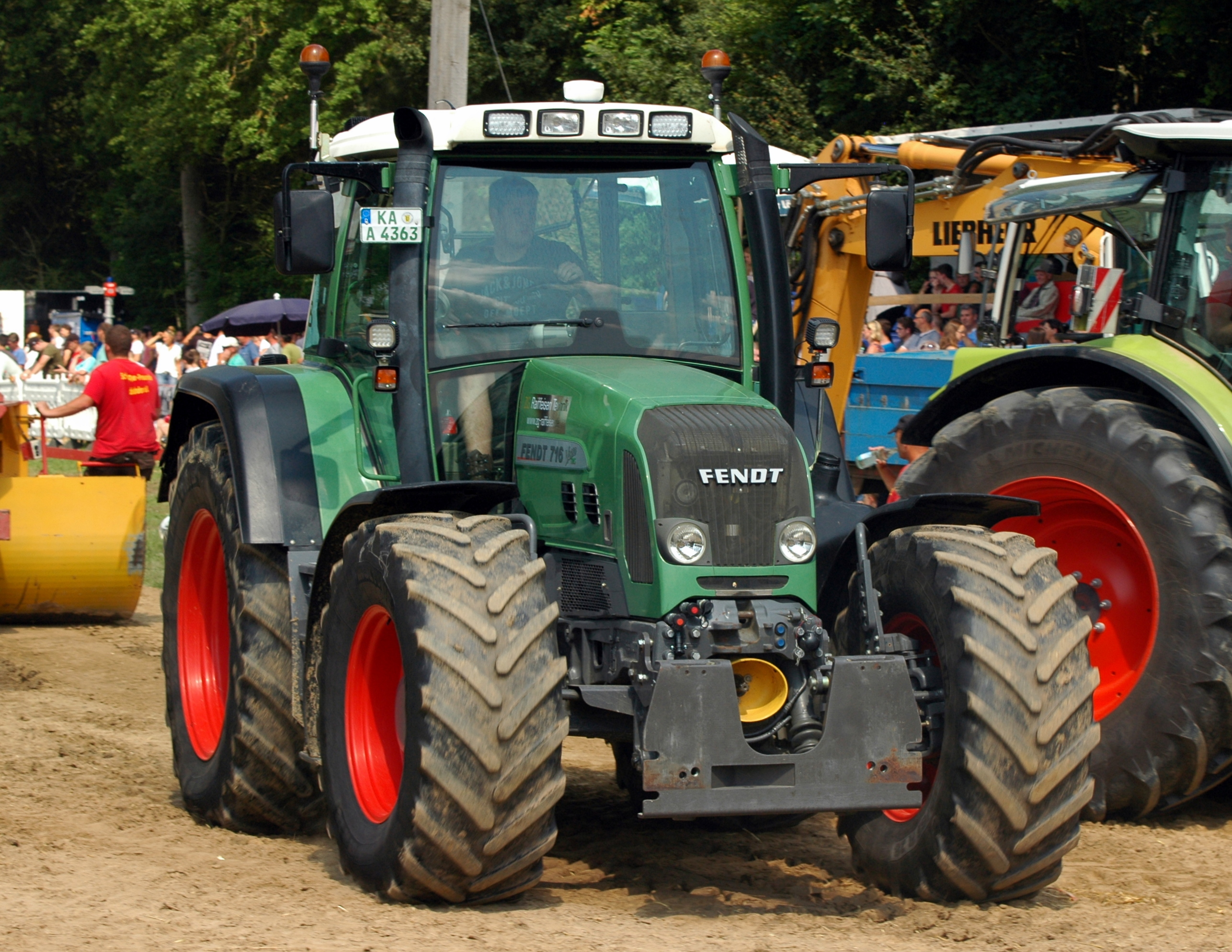
Fendt 700 Vario Gen2

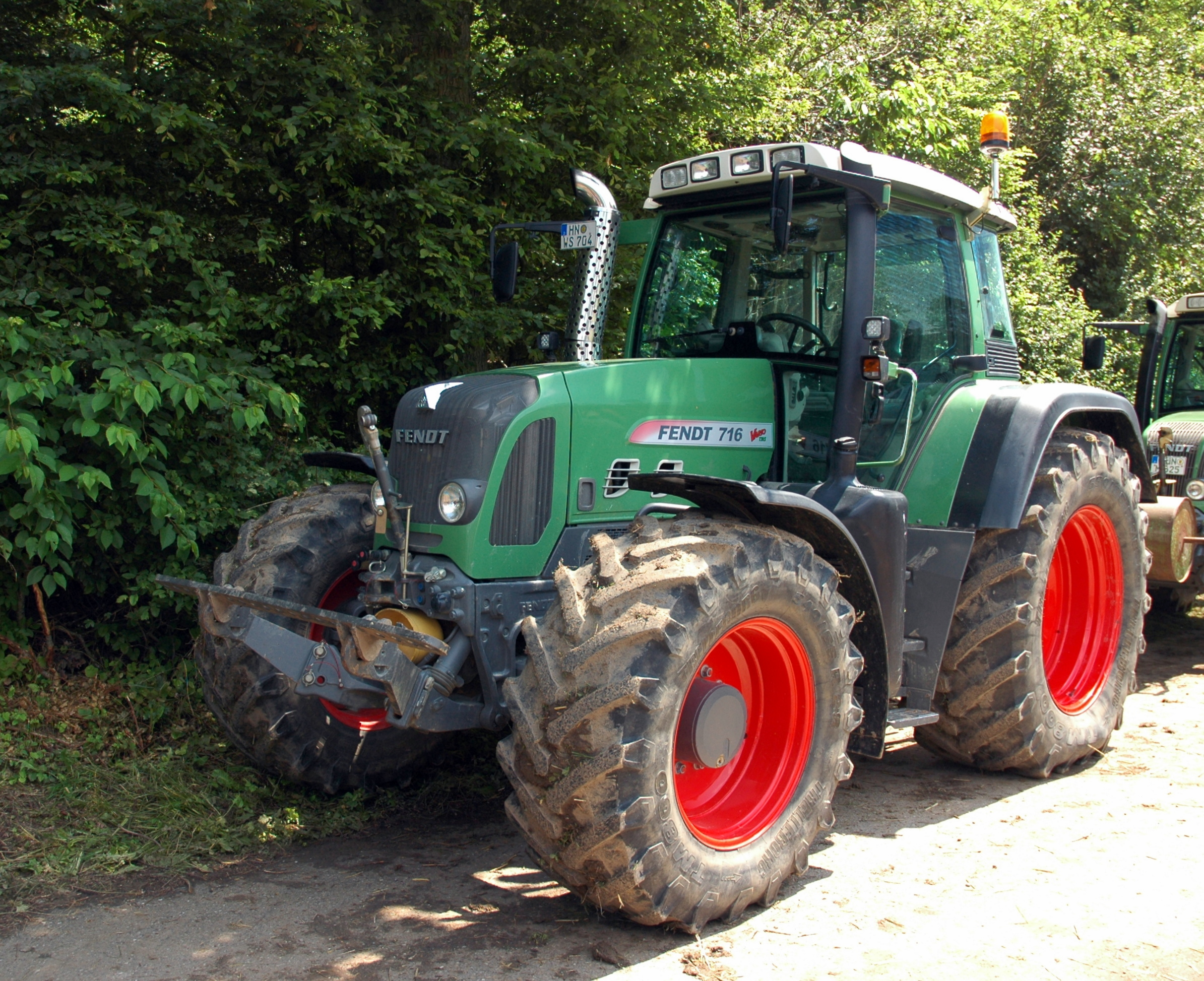
Fendt 700 Vario Gen3

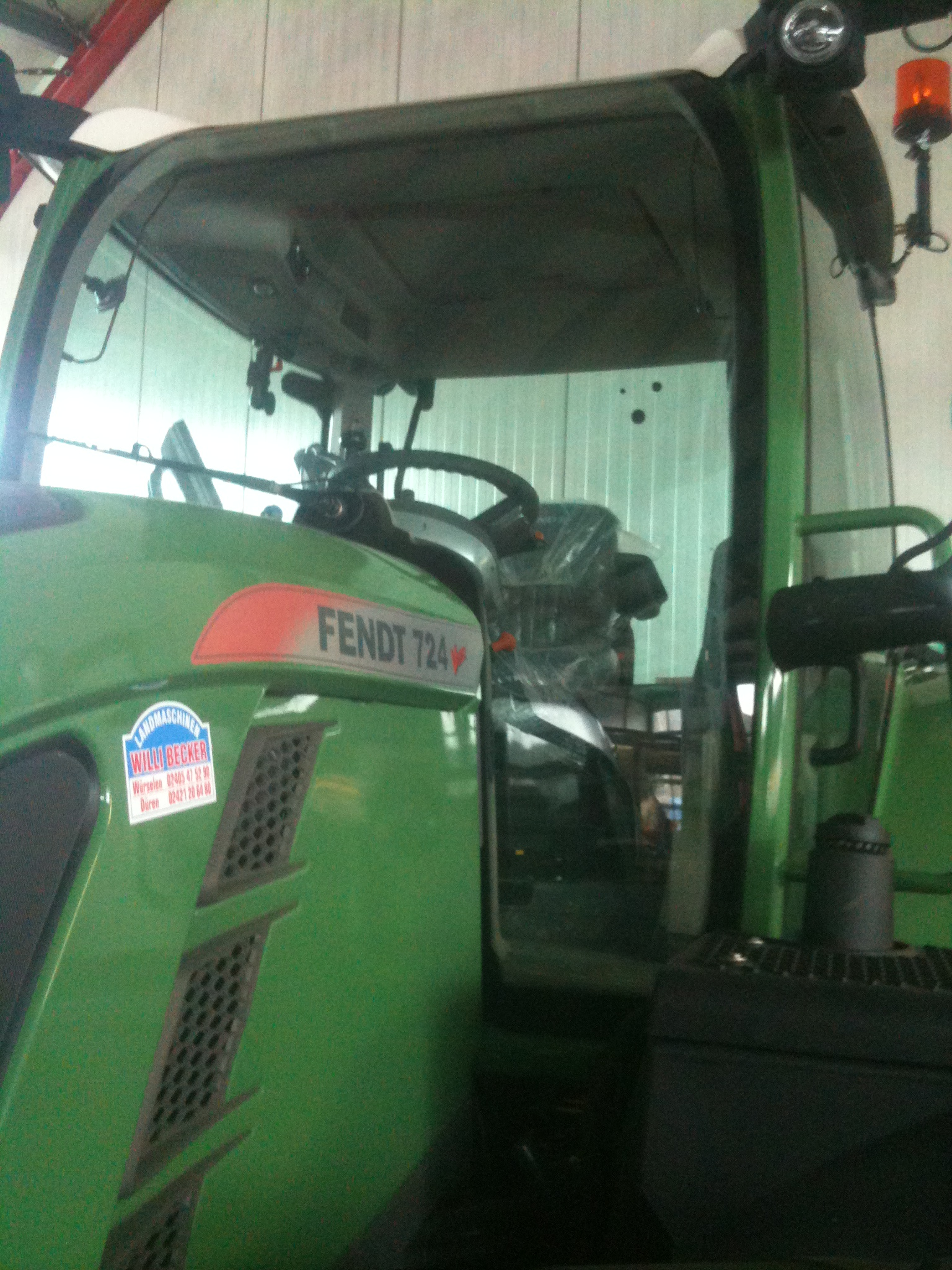
Fendt 700 Vario Gen4

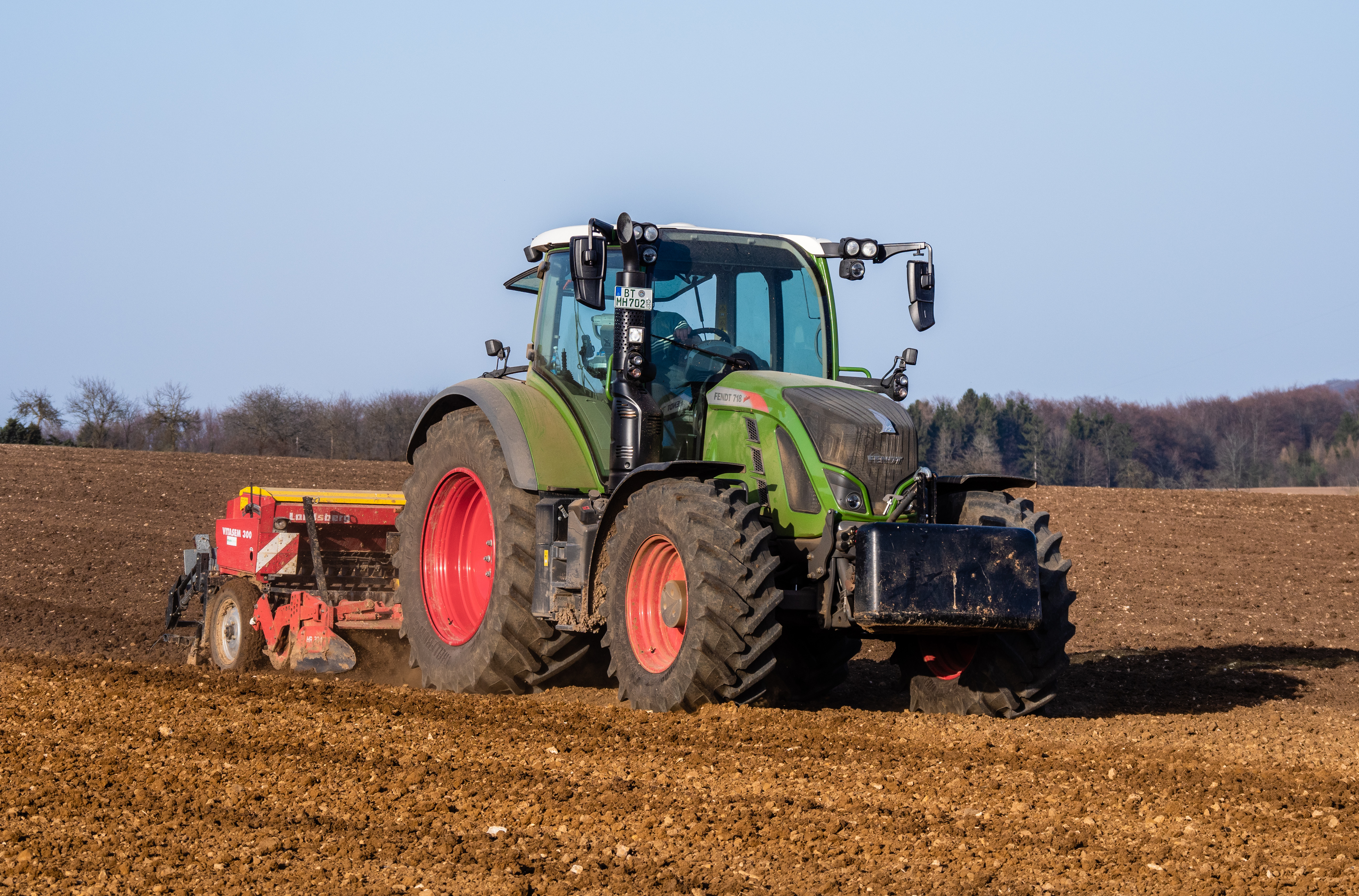
Fendt 700 Vario Gen5

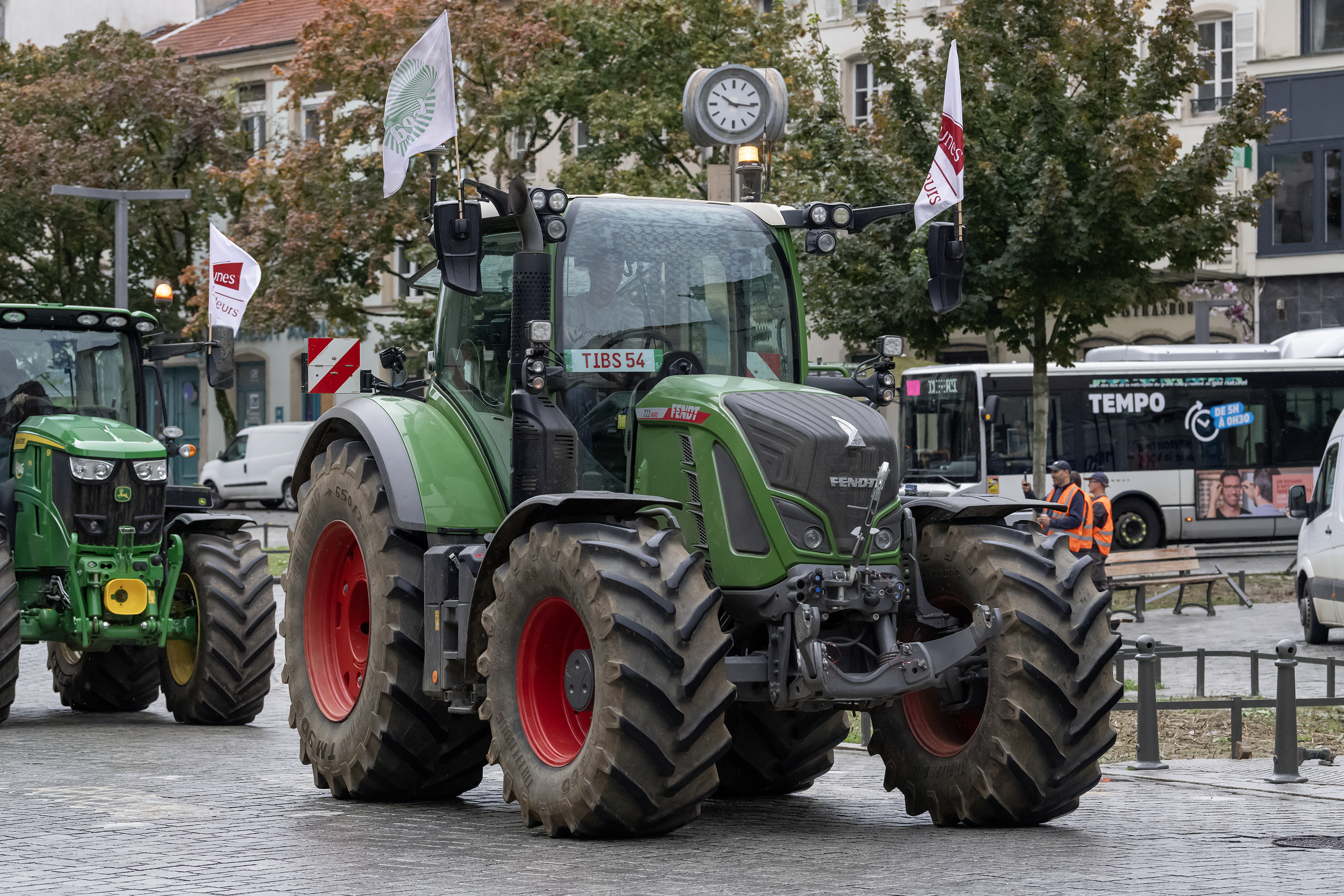
Fendt 700 Vario Gen6

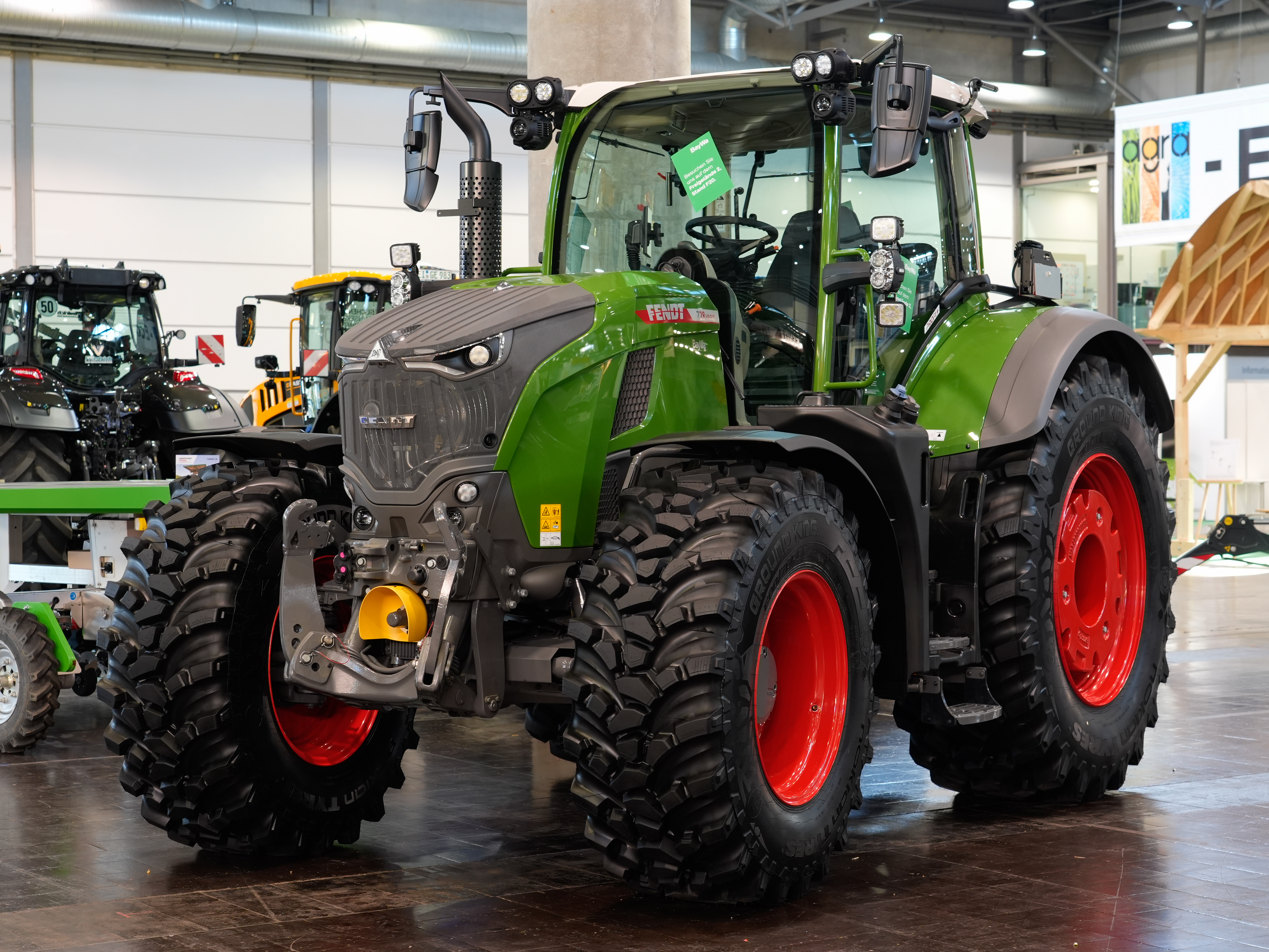
Fendt 700 Vario Gen7
