= Fendt Katana =

Fendt
- Manufacturer: Fendt
- Production: 2011 - present
- Engine model: Mercedes Benz, From 2015: MTU From 2022: Liebherr
- Speed: 20 km/h in the field; 40 km/h on the road

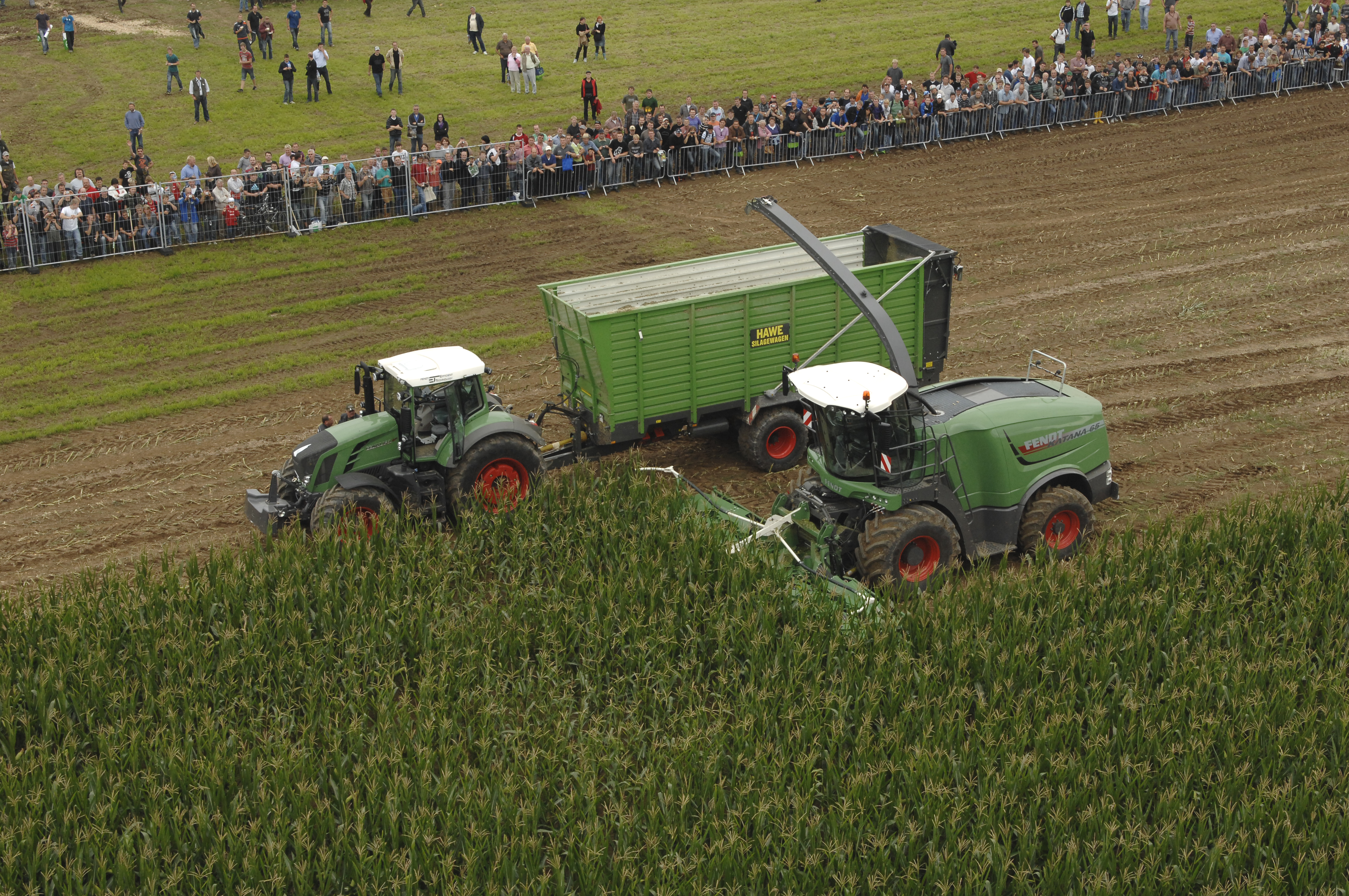

The Fendt Katana is a forage harvester from the farm machinery manufacturer Fendt, which is primarily used for maize harvesting and grass cutting. Since its market launch in 2012, the Katana 65, Katana 85 and Katana 650 models have been released in several generations. The latest model, the Katana 850, was first presented to the public in August 2022.

== Series and History ==
In 2012, the first forage harvester of the Katana series, the Fendt Katana 65, was delivered to customers. The series is named after the Japanese long sword, which is known for its sharpness and durability. Despite Fendt's relatively late entry into the forage harvester market, the Katana 65 quickly established itself in the market: By 2013, only two years later, the number of machines produced had already reached 100 units.

The second forage harvester from Fendt, the Katana 85, went into production in the same year. Equipped with a 12-cylinder engine from MPU and 850 HP, it was significantly more powerful than the Katana 65. The Katana 85 was first delivered for the season in 2014.

In 2015, Fendt further developed the proven Katana 65 model. Among other things, the cladding and frame were optimized to reduce the weight of the forage harvester. In addition, the Mercedes-Benz engine of the previous model was replaced by the MTU 6R 1500 with 15.6 litres of displacement. With harvesting attachments for all applications, an optimized material flow, and the largest chopping drum on the market to date, the manufacturer prepares the second generation of the series for worldwide use.

In 2019, the new Fendt Katana 650 model was presented at Agritechnica. Like the previous models Katana 65 and 85, the new, more powerful Katana 650 is also produced at the AGCO factory in Hohenmölsen, Saxony-Anhalt. As a new approach to quality assurance, Fendt sent the forage harvester to the field for the first time before the official production start to analyze its performance.

In 2020, the Fendt Katana 650 was awarded the Innovation Prize "Silver Leaf" at the Fieragricola agriculture fair in Verona. Among other things, the prize evaluates the degree of innovation, productivity, sustainability, and user-friendliness of products.

In August 2022, the Fendt Katana 850 was presented as a new high-performance model of the series. Equipped with a Liebherr D976 engine and 18 litres of displacement, the forage harvester offers a rated power of 623 kW and 847 HP at 17,500 kg weight. The chopping drum of the Katana 850 is still the largest on the market at 720mm.

The Fendt Katana forage harvester has variable air filters with a reverse function that ensures constant cooling performance. With the new Kemper 490plus maize header, the Katana 850 is available with 12 working rows. In addition, there are three different roller crushers to choose from.
