= JAG =

JAG or Jag may refer to:

== People ==
- Jag Bains (born 1998), American television personality
- Jag Bhaduria (born 1940), Canadian politician
- Jag de Bellouet (1997–2025), French racing trotter
- Jag Huang (born 1981), Chinese actor and screenwriter
- Jag Mohan Nath (1930–2023), Indian air force officer and commander
- Jag Mundhra (1948–2011), Indian filmmaker
- Jag Sahota, Indian-Canadian politician
- Jag Singh, British internet entrepreneur and investor
- Michael Jagmin (born 1985), American rock singer

=== Initials ===
- James A. Garfield (1831–1881), 20th U.S. president
- James Alexander Gordon (1938–2014), BBC radio broadcaster known as "Jag"
- John Atkinson Grimshaw (1836–1893), Victorian-era artist who sometimes signed his early paintings "JAG"
- J. A. G. Roberts (born 1935), British historian and lecturer

== Arts, entertainment, and media ==
- JAG (band), a Christian rock band that recorded during the early 1990s
- JAG (TV series), an American adventure/legal drama television series
- "Jag", a song from The Mad Capsule Markets' 1999 album Osc-Dis
- CJAG-FM, a Canadian radio station branded as JAG 92.3
- Jag (comics), a 1968 to 1969 British comic
- The Jags, a British power pop / new wave band

== Brands and enterprises ==
- Jag, nickname for Jaguar Cars
- JAG (clothing), Australian clothing brand
- JAG Communications, UK mobile phone retailer

== Military ==
- Judge advocate general
- Judge Advocate General's Corps (United States)
- PAF Base Shahbaz (IATA code: JAG), Pakistan Air Force base

== Other uses ==
- Jags, nickname for the Jacksonville Jaguars
- Edward Byrne Memorial Justice Assistance Grant Program, US federal funding for local jurisdictions
- Jobs for America's Graduates

== See also ==
- JAGS (disambiguation)
- Jaguar (disambiguation)
