= Fendt Caravan =

Germain travel trailer manufacturer

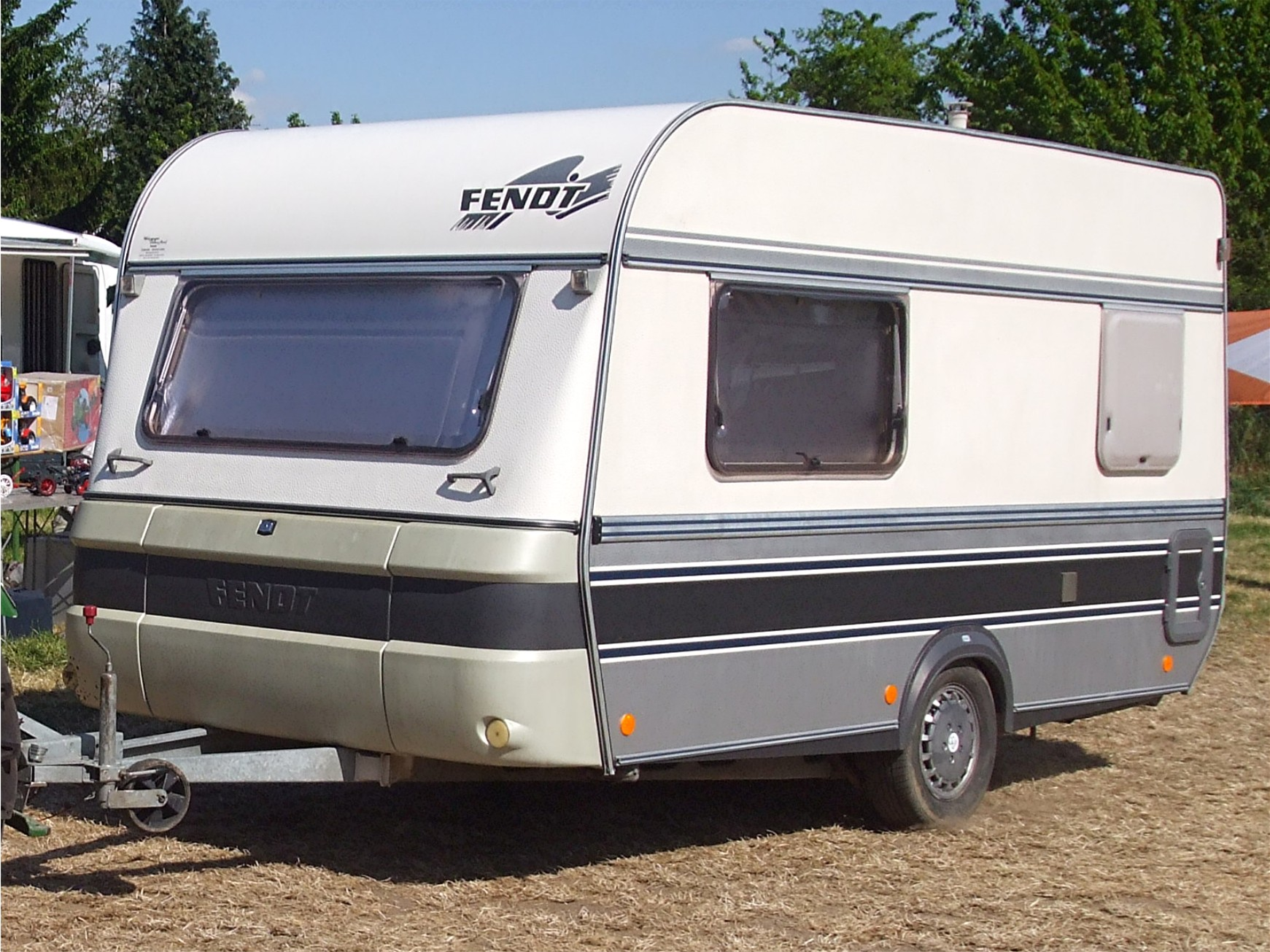
Fendt Diamant travel trailer

Fendt-Caravan GmbH is a German manufacturer of travel trailers (caravans) and recreational vehicles; its headquarters is located in Mertingen. Bought out January 1., 1998 Fendt-Caravan since has been a 100% subsidiary of the Hobby-Wohnwagenwerk Ing. Harald Striewski GmbH.

The number of new Fendt caravan registrations in Europe in 2021 was 8,712, of which 3,948 were in the home market and strongest market of Germany. Together with the Hobby Group, the market share of new caravan registrations in Germany (2021/22) was 37.7%.

== Products ==
In the 2023 season, Fendt-Caravan will offer 33 models in 5 ranges from entry-level to luxury caravans, as well as special family layouts. The manufacturer places its entire model range in the premium segment.

In addition, a separate model range of 4 series with 15 models is offered for the French market.
