= National Sheep Identification System =

Registration system for ovine and caprine animals in Ireland

The National Sheep Identification System (NSIS) is a government regulation-based system in Ireland for identifying sheep. It was introduced as part of the EU-wide system for the identification and registration of ovine and caprine animals in December 2003. These measures were introduced following the 2001 United Kingdom foot-and-mouth outbreak.

Under the NSIS, all sheep flock owners must be registered, all sheep must be tagged and details of all sheep on farms and all sheep movements must be fully recorded. This system, which encompasses producers, marts, meat factories and others, provides that Ireland has full traceability for all sheep, on an individual basis. They have to be tagged to be able to go to the market.
