= JAGS =

JAGS or Jags may refer to:

- James Allen's Girls' School, south London
- Just another Gibbs sampler, simulation software
- JAGS McCartney International Airport, Turks and Caicos Islands
- Journal of the American Geriatrics Society
- Jags Panesar, a fictional character from EastEnders
- The Jags, 1970s British rock band
- Jacksonville Jaguars, NFL American football team
- Jaguar Cars, "Jags" in the plural sense
- Partick Thistle F.C., Scottish association football team

== See also ==
- JAG (disambiguation)
- Jaguar (disambiguation)
- Jesse Jagz
