= Claas Jaguar =

Self-propelled forage harvester

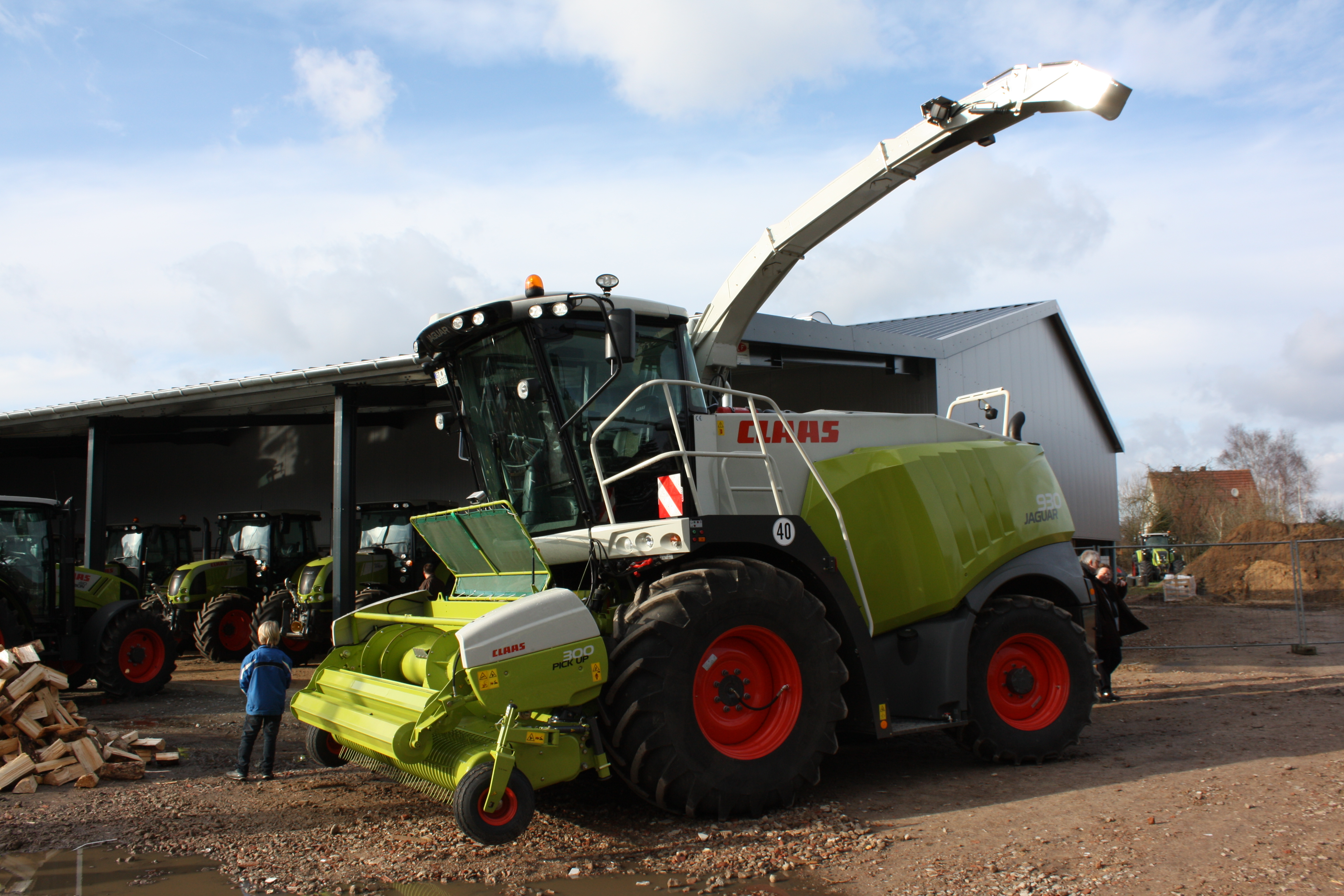
Claas Jaguar 930

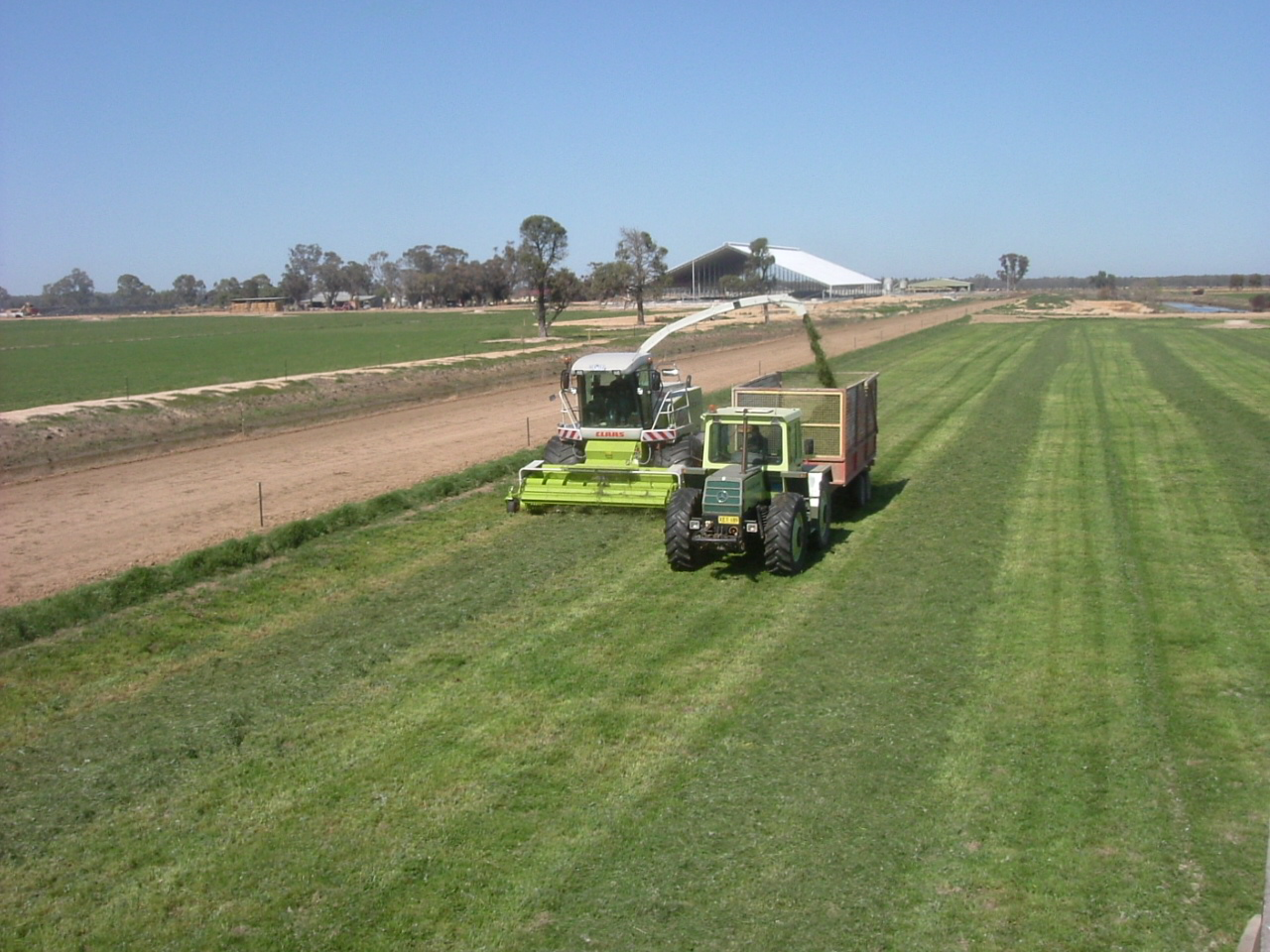
A Claas Jaguar cutting grass silage.

Claas Jaguar is a self-propelled forage harvester that is built by German farm machinery company Claas and is powered by a DaimlerChrysler diesel engine. Models are identified by numbers; current models are numbered 830, 850, 870, 890, and 900, and range from 254 kW (345 hp) to 458 kW (623 hp). Launched in 2007 were the Jaguar 950, 960, 970, and 980.

== History ==
The first Jaguar was built in 1973, with the 10,000th machine being built in 1994, the 15,000th in 1998 and the 20,000th built in 2004. The 30,000th Jaguar was built in 2011 and was displayed at the Agritechnica farm show in Germany with a special black livery. The 40,000th Jaguar was built in 2019 and was displayed at Sima in Paris.

== Success ==
Claas Jaguars are the most common type of silage harvester in the world. Of the forage harvesters sold in Ireland from 2000 to 2003, 60% were Claas Jaguars. Claas Jaguars held 41% of forage harvesters sold in United Kingdom in 2005 and 2006, with John Deere selling just 23%. Claas also sell very well in North America. The Claas Jaguar has been in production since 1973.

== Green Eye & Speedstar ==
The Claas Jaguar Speedstar was first sold in 2003. Before then, most silage harvesters went at a normal speed of 20 km/h during roading. With the Speedstar however, the machine was much faster at 40 km/h.

The Claas Jaguar Green Eye is quite a new addition. After four years of scientific experiments, the Green Eye was produced in May 2007. The current 900 model currently being sold in Europe is known as the Claas Jaguar 900 Green Eye. The Green Eye is available in other models as well.
