= Jaguar (drink) =

Russian alcoholic energy drink

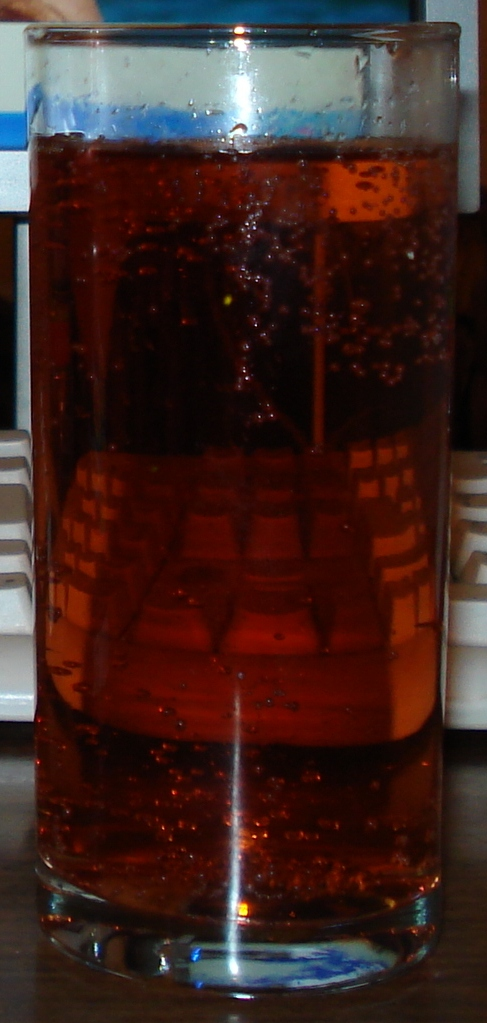
The appearance of the drink

Jaguar (Russian: Ягуáр, transliterated as "yaguár") is an alcoholic energy drink commonly available in many post-Soviet countries.

It is a carbonated ready-to-drink cocktail produced by I.B.B. Ltd. (London) since 2002, or by Happyland LLC (Moscow).

Jaguar is known as being extremely popular among young people, despite the fact that selling alcohol to minors is prohibited and has a reputation for being abused by gopniki delinquents. The manufacturer, however, claims beneficial qualities to Jaguar in its advertising by emphasizing the relatively low alcohol content of the Jaguar drink when compared with hard liquors, as well as the benefits of other ingredients including vitamins and stimulants (caffeine and taurine).

In East Slavic languages, it is commonplace to "translate" the name and call the beverage with the following Russian spelling (ягуар) for "jaguar", similar to the animal. It is also often referred to as "Yaga" or even "Jaga", which led to the official "Yaga" edition of the drink. "Jaga Fest" was commemorated by the release of limited edition "Jaga Fest" designs of "original" flavour drink cans. Other less common nicknames include words "yasha" (short for Yakov) or "yagel" (Russian: ягель, see lichen).

In Ukraine, Jaguar beverage is produced as "Jaguaro".

In 2009, Jaguar was described as one of the leading brands of the Russian ready-to-drink beverage market, with a share of 8%.

In 2010, the alcohol content of Jaguar was reduced from 9% to 7% in order to meet new regulations regarding "beer and carbonated alcoholic produce". The 9% version is still being produced and marketed as "Jaguar Ultra", available only via import from IBB's factories. However, the Russian site features an "Ultra-Light" version, which has 7.2% alcohol content. Alcohol-free versions of Jaguar drink, which use PETE bottles instead of aluminium bottles of the same volume, have been reported to exist since April 2014.

According to info from Jaguar-energy.ru, since 2015, the design of Jaguar beverage cans bears the slogan "cила cвободы", which may be translated both as "power of freedom" and "strength of freedom".
