= Jaguar Racing =

Jaguar Racing may refer to:

- Jaguar Racing (Formula One)
- Jaguar Racing (Formula E)

== See also ==
- Jaguar in motorsport
