= Valmet 361 D =

Diesel tractor

Valmet 361D
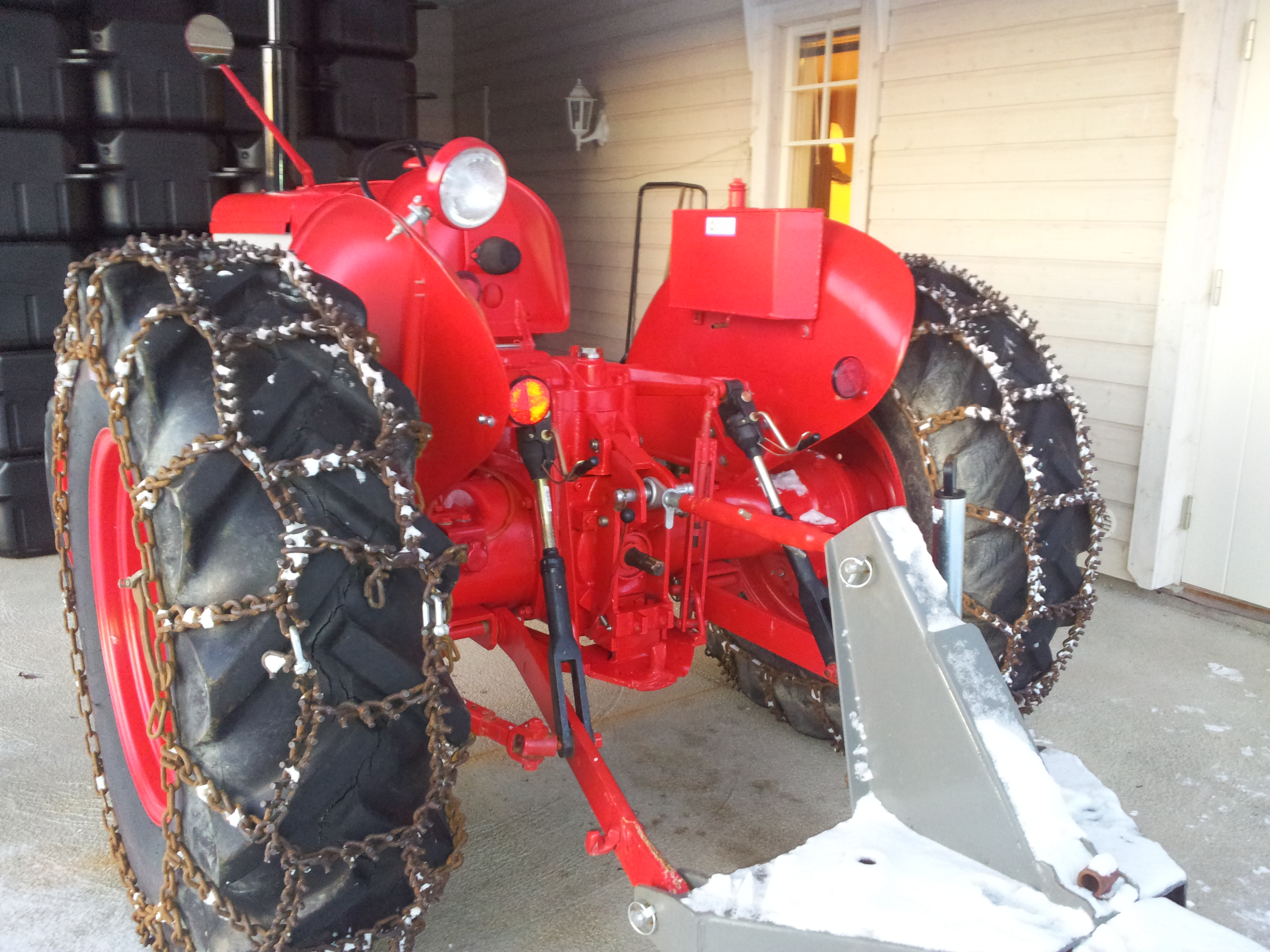
- Type: Agricultural
- Manufacturer: Valmet
- Production: 1960-1965
- Length: 3,000 mm (9 ft 10 in)
- Height: 1,750 mm (5 ft 9 in)
- Weight: 1,770 kg (3,902 lb)
- Propulsion: Valmet 310D (1960-1962); Valmet 310A (1962-1965); Wheels

Valmet 361 D was the third diesel tractor built by Valmet.

At the end of 1960, the 361 D was released, replacing the 359 D. It featured a new body, with a more broad and squarer style than before, although it did carry over many of the mechanical components from its predecessor. The engine was a revised 310D (a 2,685 cc (163.8 cu in) diesel engine), utilizing Bosch-designed fuel injection and electrics and producing 46 hp (34 kW) (DIN SAE) and 157 N⋅m (116 lbf⋅ft) of torque. It had a top speed of 28 km/h (17 mph), and could lift up to 1,200 kg (2,646 lb).

== Variants Mk1 and Mk2 ==
In 1962, a differential lock, an hour meter and a padded seat were all added. During the same year, a second model (MK2) was released, featuring a more advanced hydraulic system. This allowed position control, based on the top link draft control, as well as mixing control. The Mk2 also saw some cost-cutting measures, such as the Bosch fuel injection being replaced by a lower performance Simms unit, as well as Lucas electrics replacing the Bosch. The 310D engine was replaced by a cheaper 310A unit. The most prominent exterior differences between the MK1 and MK2 are a spraying device, and a lifting device connected to the hand lever.

== Replacement ==
In 1965, a replacement was introduced in the form of the Valmet 565. The major differences between the 565 and 361 are a smaller rear wheel diameter (24 in (610 mm) vs 32 in (813 mm)), and revised front grille and seat.

== Valmet 361 Images ==
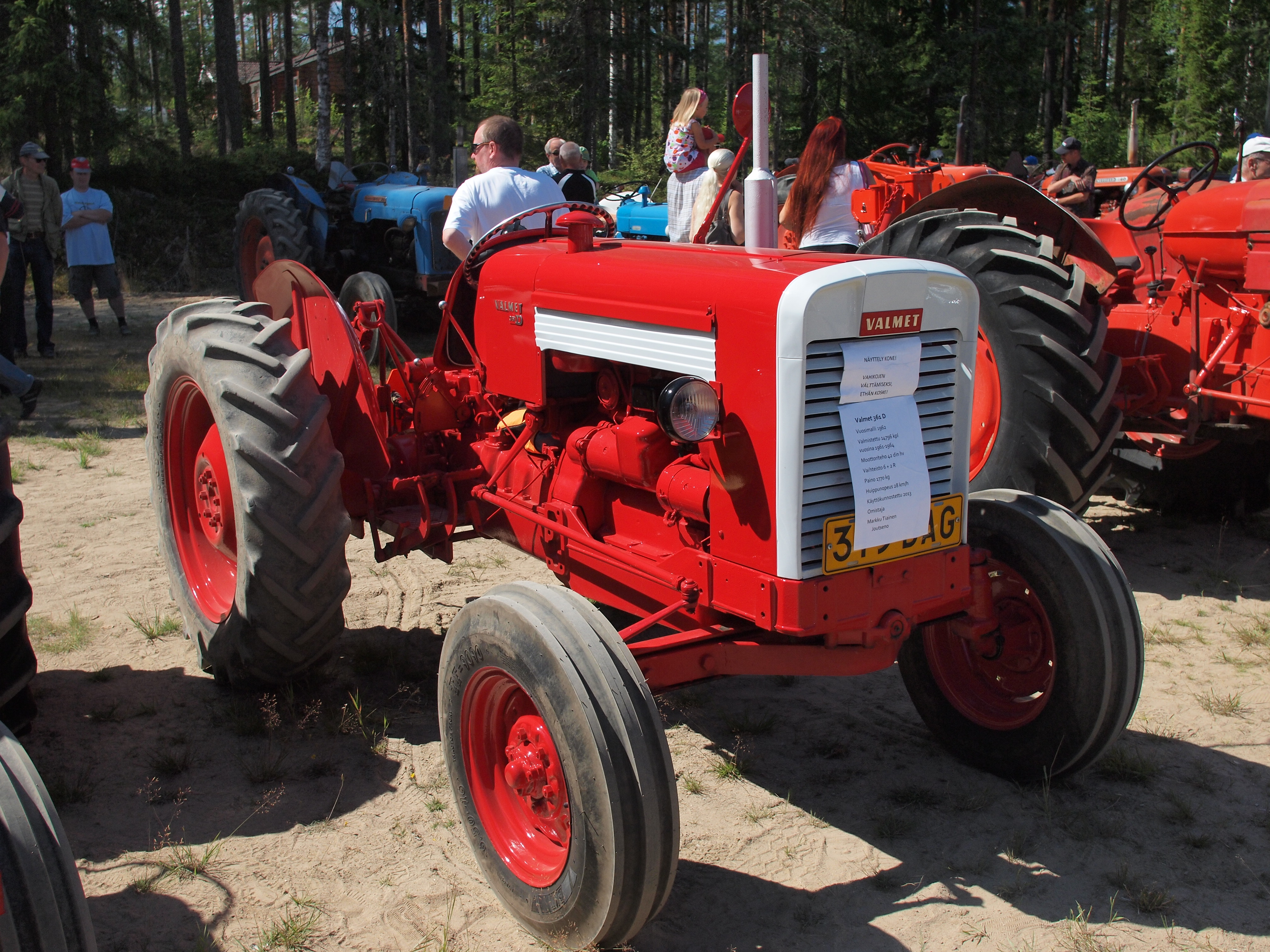
Valmet 361 D 1962

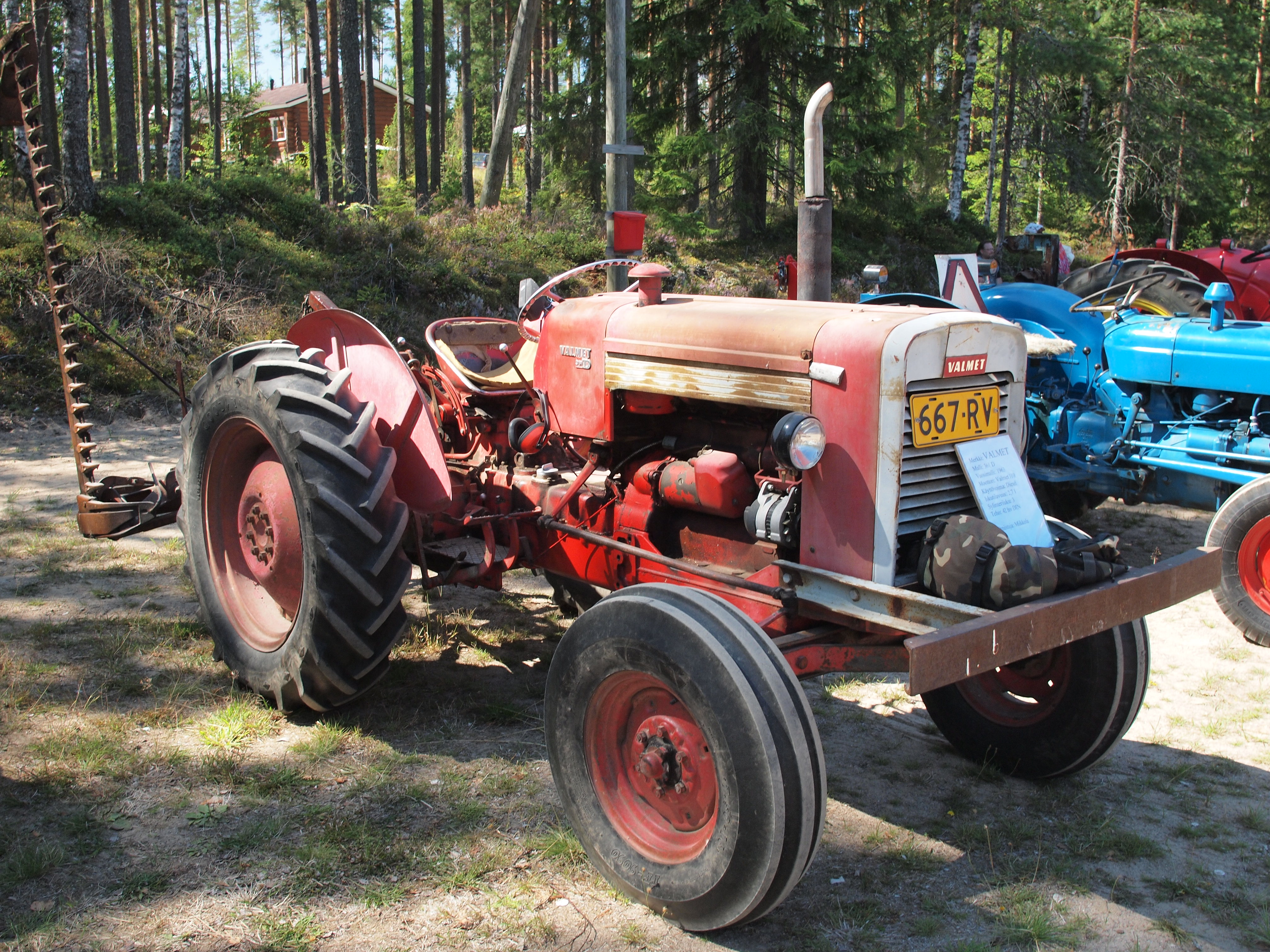
Valmet 361 D 1963

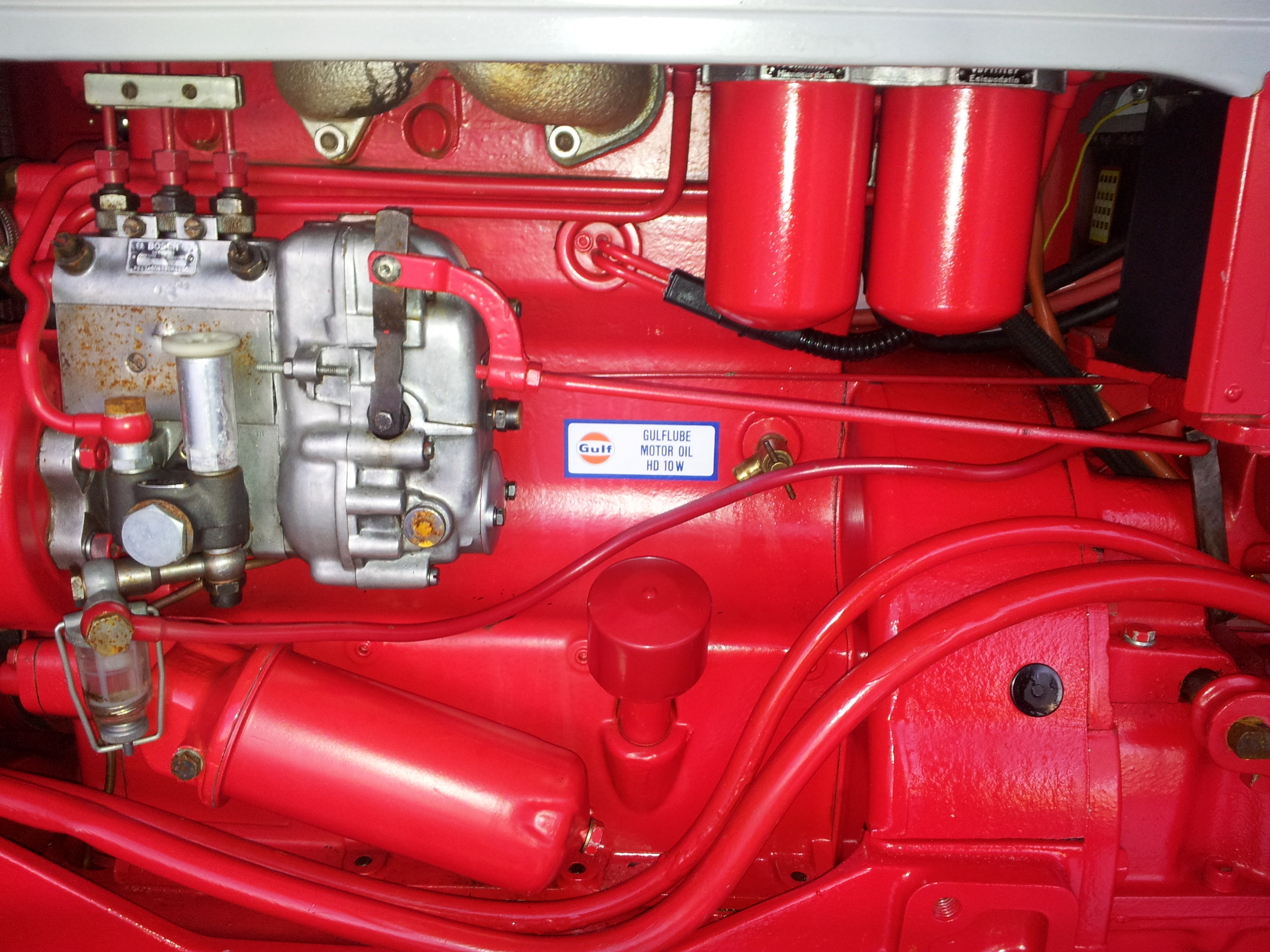
Valmet 361 Bosch injection pump

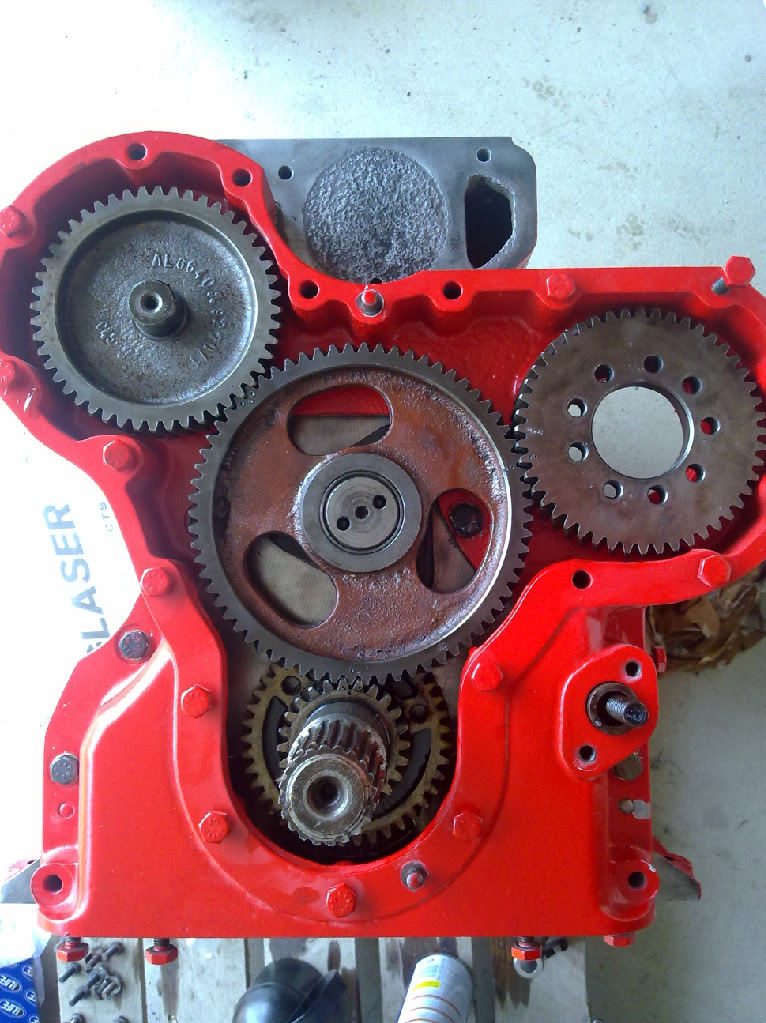
Valmet D-310

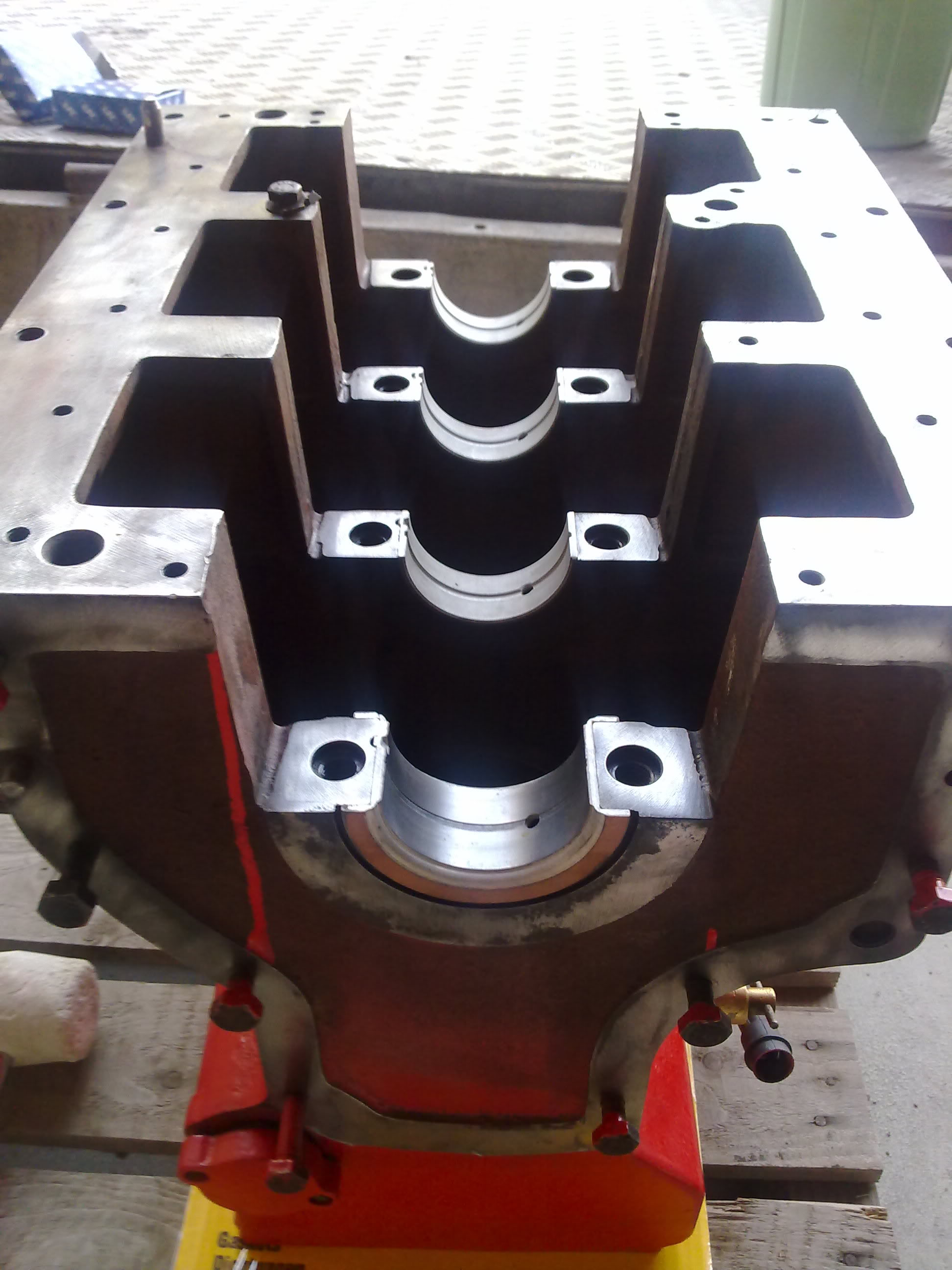
Valmet D-310 main bearing

50's and 60's valmet logo

== See also ==
- All Valmet models
- Volvo BM
- Volvo BM Valmet
- Valmet-Valtra
- Valtra

== Sources ==
- Konedata
- Valtra
- Valmet-talli: Finnish Valmet forum
- Vanhat valmetit Ry. (Old time Valmet club, finland)
- Valtra History
- See Valmet 361 videos
