= Valtra =

Finnish agricultural machine manufacturer

Valtra Oy Ab
- Formerly: Valmet
- Type: Osakeyhtiö
- Industry: Agricultural machinery
- Founded: 1951 in Jyväskylä, Finland (start of tractor production); 12 December 2003 in Suolahti, Finland (as a separate company)
- Headquarters: Äänekoski, Finland
- Area served: Worldwide
- Key people: Jari Rautjärvi (General Director)
- Products: Tractors; Combines; Sugarcane harvester Seed drills Self-propelled sprayers
- Revenue: ▼€84,809,000 (2015); €89,701,000 (2014)
- Net income: ▲€11,708,000 (2015); €10,836,000 (2014)
- Number of employees: 918 (2014)
- Parent: AGCO
- Website: valtra.com

Valtra is an agricultural machinery manufacturer based in Äänekoski, Finland. Valtra's products include tractors, combine harvesters, sugar cane harvesters, self-propelled sprayers and seed drills. Valtra has been part of the American AGCO Corporation since 2004.

== Company ==
Valtra Inc. is a fully owned subsidiaries of the American agricultural equipment manufacturer AGCO Corporation. AGCO's headquarters are situated in Duluth, Georgia, and its EAME head office in Neuhausen, Switzerland. AGCO is the world's third largest manufacturer of agricultural equipment. In addition to Valtra, other AGCO brands include Massey Ferguson, Fendt, Challenger and GSI. In Finland AGCO also owns the AGCO Power engine plant in Linnavuori, Nokia, which produces off-road diesel engines for AGCO and other manufacturers. AGCO is listed on the New York Stock Exchange. Valtra Inc. employed 918 people at the Suolahti tractor plant at the end of 2014. Valtra manufactures around 20,000 tractors a year at its plants in Suolahti and Mogi das Cruzes, Brazil.

== History ==
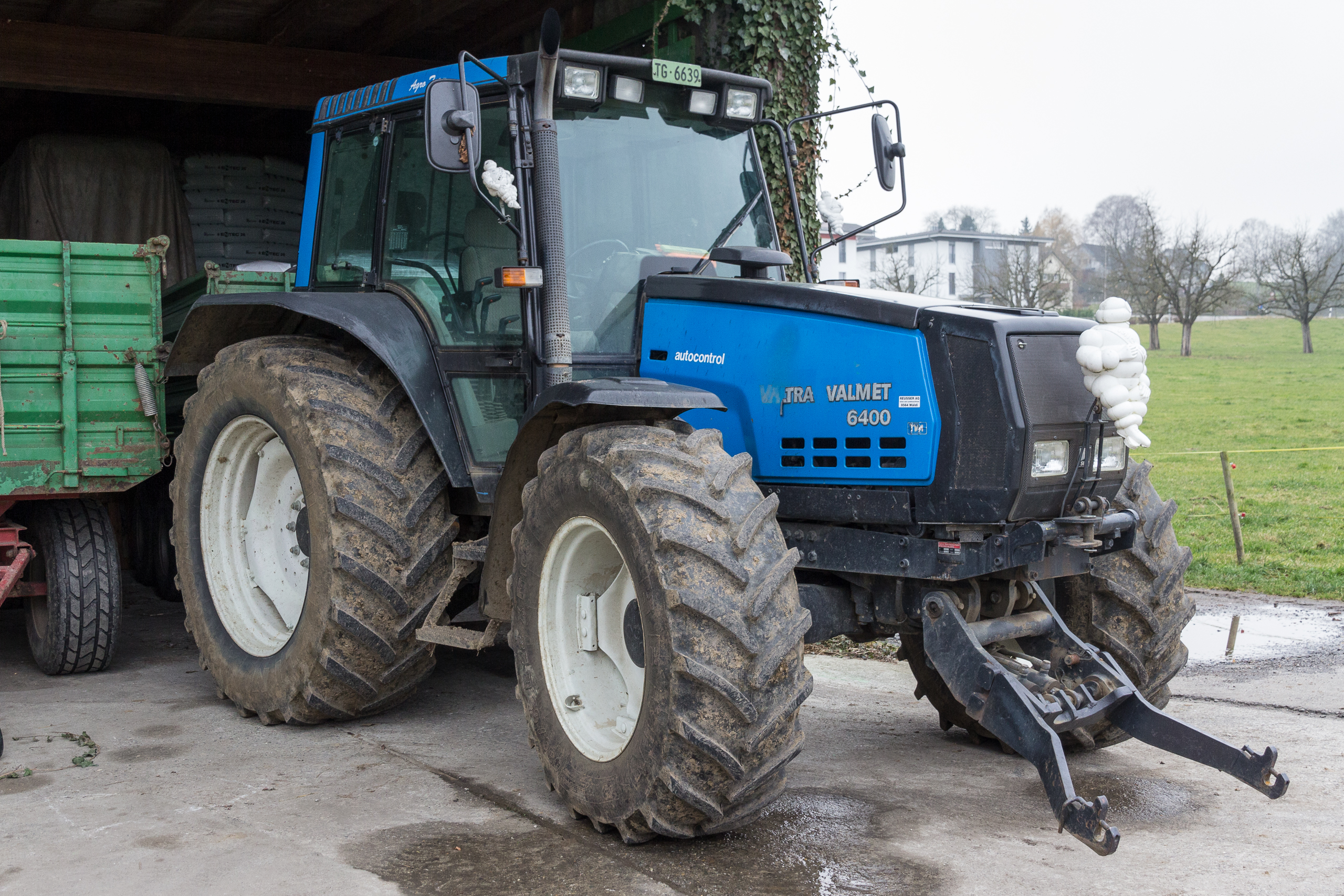
Valtra Valmet 6400

Valtra's roots go back to the Finnish State Rifle Factory founded in Jyväskylä in 1928 and the Finnish State Artillery Factory, which moved from Helsinki to Jyväskylä in 1939. Following the Second World War in 1945, the former defensive weaponry plants owned by the Finnish State were combined under a new organisation, the State Metal Works (Valtion Metallitehtaat), the name of which was then shortened to Valmet. Following the war, the artillery and rifle plants were converted to produce goods for war reparations and civil use, although the rifle plant also continued to produce military and civilian weapons until 1992.

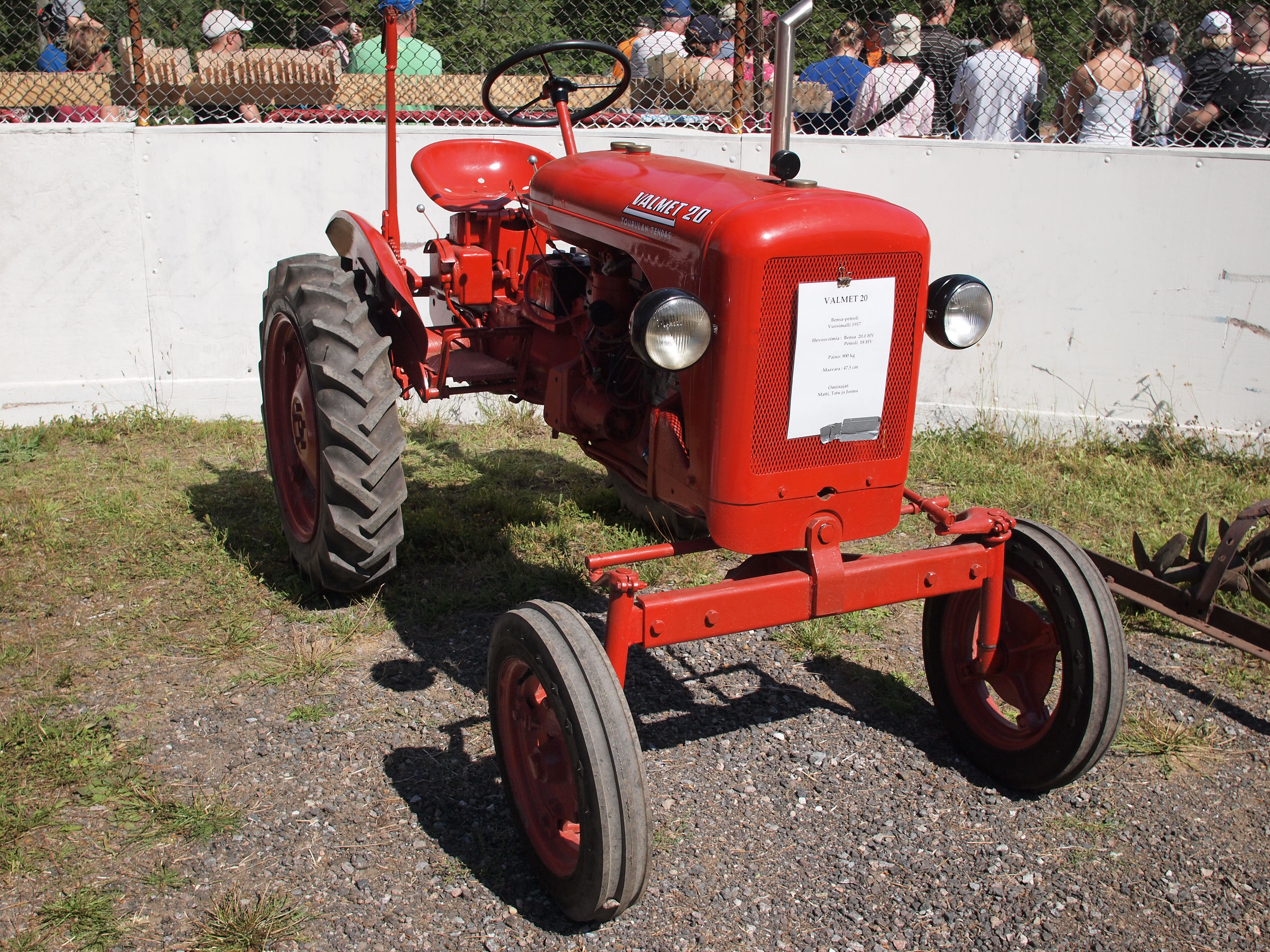
Valmet 20 was the second tractor model.

The first Valmet tractors were manufactured in 1951. The prototypes and first 10 tractors were the result of cooperation between the artillery and rifle plants, after which tractor production was consolidated within the rifle plant in Tourula, Jyväskylä. The first tractors actually used parts of cannon barrel for their subframes.

The first tractor model was the Valmet 15, the model number indicating its horsepower. The tractor was designed to replace horses on small Finnish farms and in the forests. The upgraded Valmet 20 model followed in 1955.

The Valmet 33 D model was launched in 1957 with a modern diesel engine and the fuel tank located between the clutch and the gearbox, which became a trademark of Valmet and Valtra tractors. The protected position of the fuel tank also made it particularly well suited to forest work. The displacement of the three-cylinder Valmet 309 D engine was 2.7 litres, and it produced 37 horsepower (28 kW). The engine was very modern for its time. It had excellent cold start properties and featured liquid engine cooling, wet cylinder liners and direct injection.

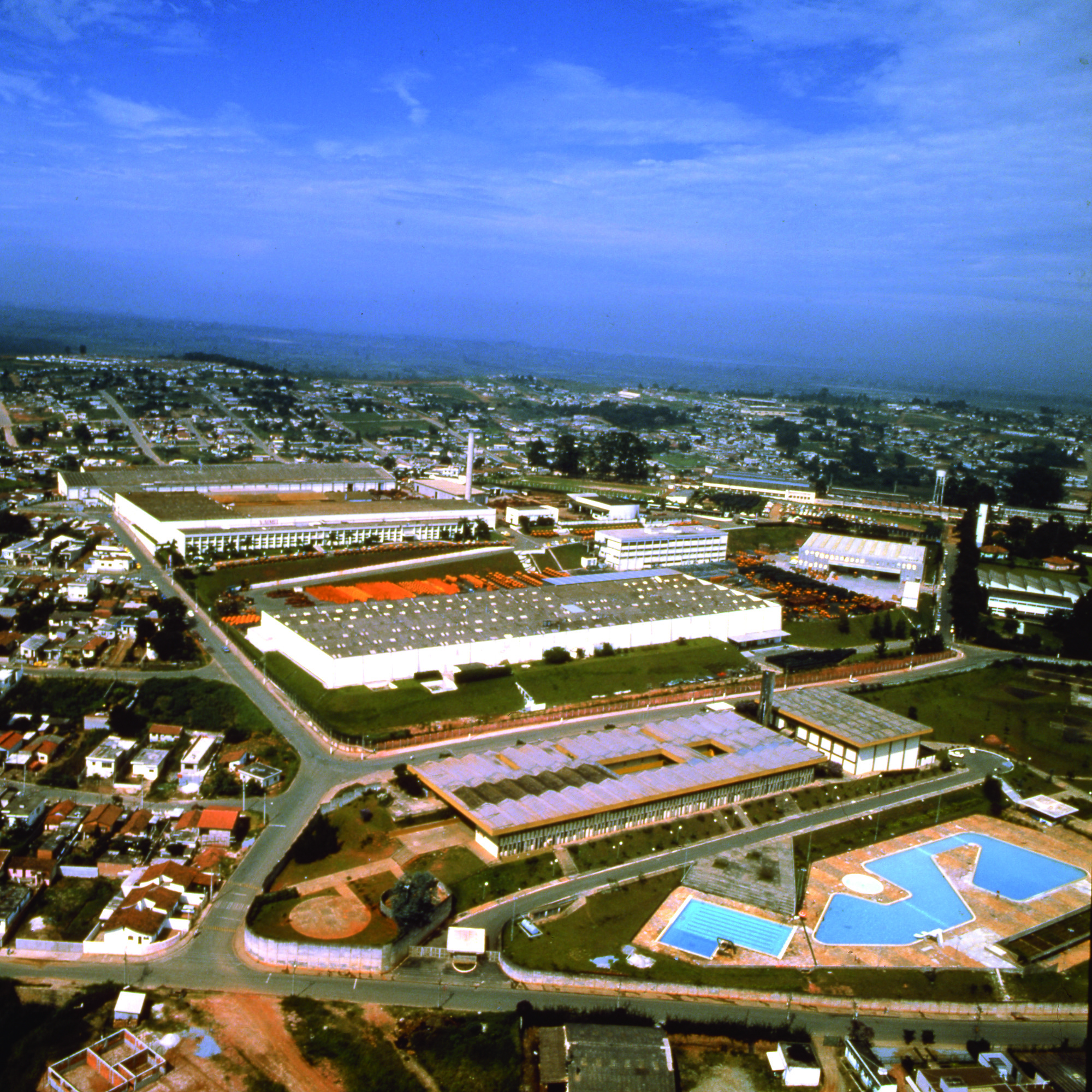
Valmet opened Valmet do Brasil tractor factory in Mogi das Cruzes, Brazil in 1960.

=== Factory in Brazil ===
By the late 1950s Valmet exported several hundred tractors a year to Brazil. The Brazilian government planned to nationalise tractor production, however, and announced a bidding competition for establishing factories there. Valmet's factory project was approved, and production began rapidly in 1960 starting with the Valmet 360 D model.

Tractor cabs became more widespread in the 1960s, especially in the Nordic markets, due to more stringent safety regulations and comfort requirements. The original Valmet factory in Tourula, Finland, could not assemble tractors with cabs due to the low ceiling, and the factory area near the expanding centre of Jyväskylä began to be too small. Accordingly, tractor production moved in 1969 to Suolahti, where the state owned an industrial site. Transmission production followed in 1975 following the construction of a new plant on the site. Marketing and engineering operations moved to Suolahti in 2005 and 2006.

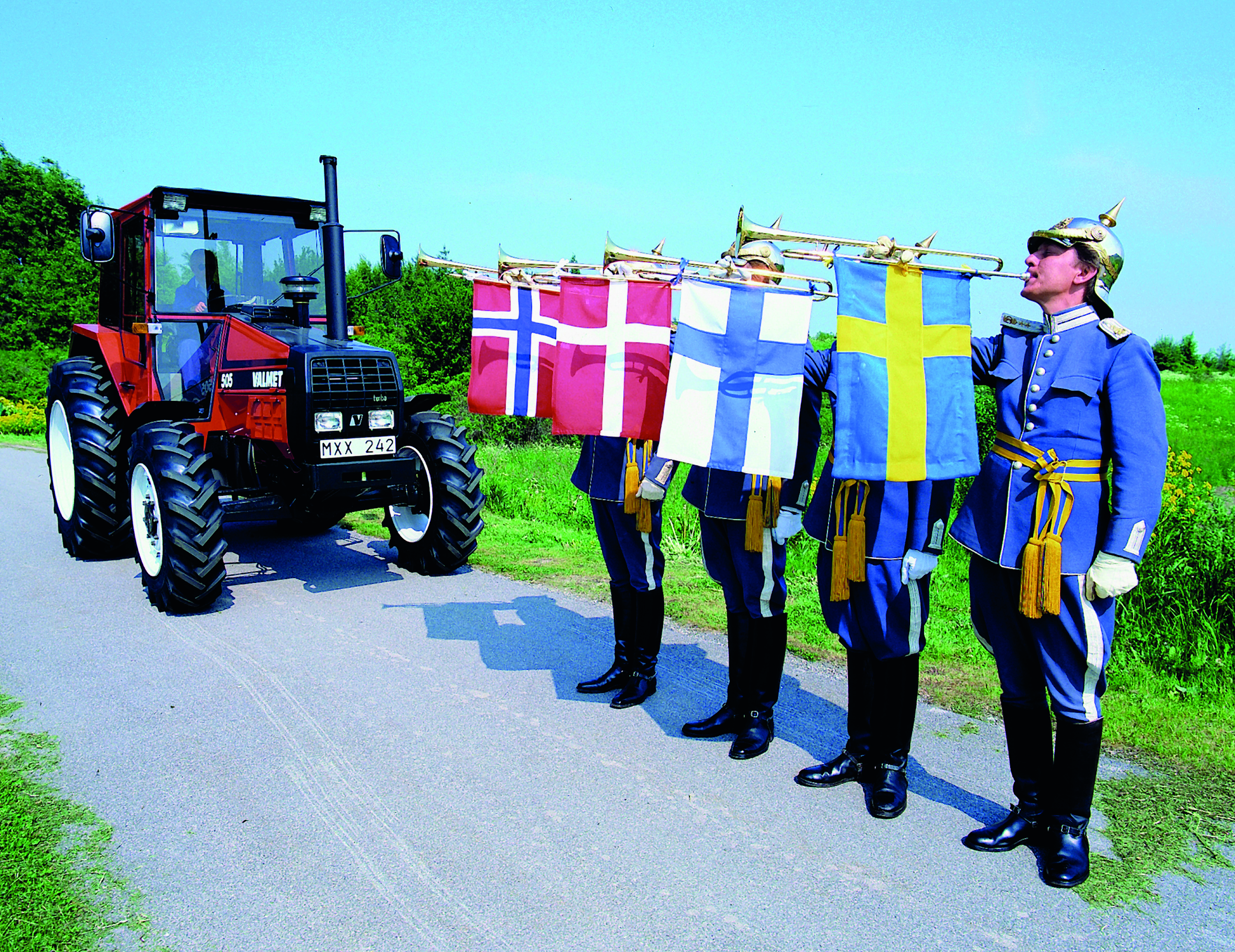
Valmet acquired Volvo BM tractor operations in 1979, creating Volvo BM Valmet tractor brand.

=== Valmet acquires Volvo BM tractors ===
Valtra traces its origin not only to Valmet, but also Bolinder, Munktell and Volvo. Bolinder-Munktell merged with the Swedish company Volvo in 1950 to form BM Volvo (later Volvo BM, now Volvo Construction Equipment). In the late 1970s Volvo BM decided to focus on construction equipment and sell off its tractor and forest machinery business. Valmet was already bigger than Volvo BM in the tractor market and was keen to invest more in the business. Volvo BM and Valmet signed a letter of intent in November 1978, and the final agreement was signed on 1 October 1979.

Work on designing a new range of tractors designated Volvo BM Valmet began already in January 1979. Scantrac AB, a joint venture between Volvo BM and Valmet, was responsible for engineering and marketing operations, as Volvo BM wanted to transfer its sales network and customers to Valmet. Tractor production at Volvo BM's factory in Eskilstuna, Sweden, was discontinued, and the factory switched to manufacturing construction equipment.

The first Volvo BM Valmet models were unveiled in Sweden in May 1982. Volvo supplied the cabs and transmission components to all 505–905 series tractors between 1982 and 1991. After taking over Volvo BM's tractor operations, Valmet became the biggest tractor brand in Northern Europe, having already been the market leader in Finland and one of the most popular brands in Brazil.

=== Factories in Tanzania and Portugal and license manufacturing ===
In 1980 Valmet and the government of Tanzania set up an assembly plant for tractors in Kibaha. The Trama company was established in the spirit of development cooperation and was 80 percent owned by the Tanzanian State Motor Corporation, 10 percent by Valmet, and 10 percent by Finnfund. Between 1983 and 1989 the Tanzanian plant manufactured around 2000 Valmet 604 Series tractors, with 10 to 12 percent of components sourced locally.

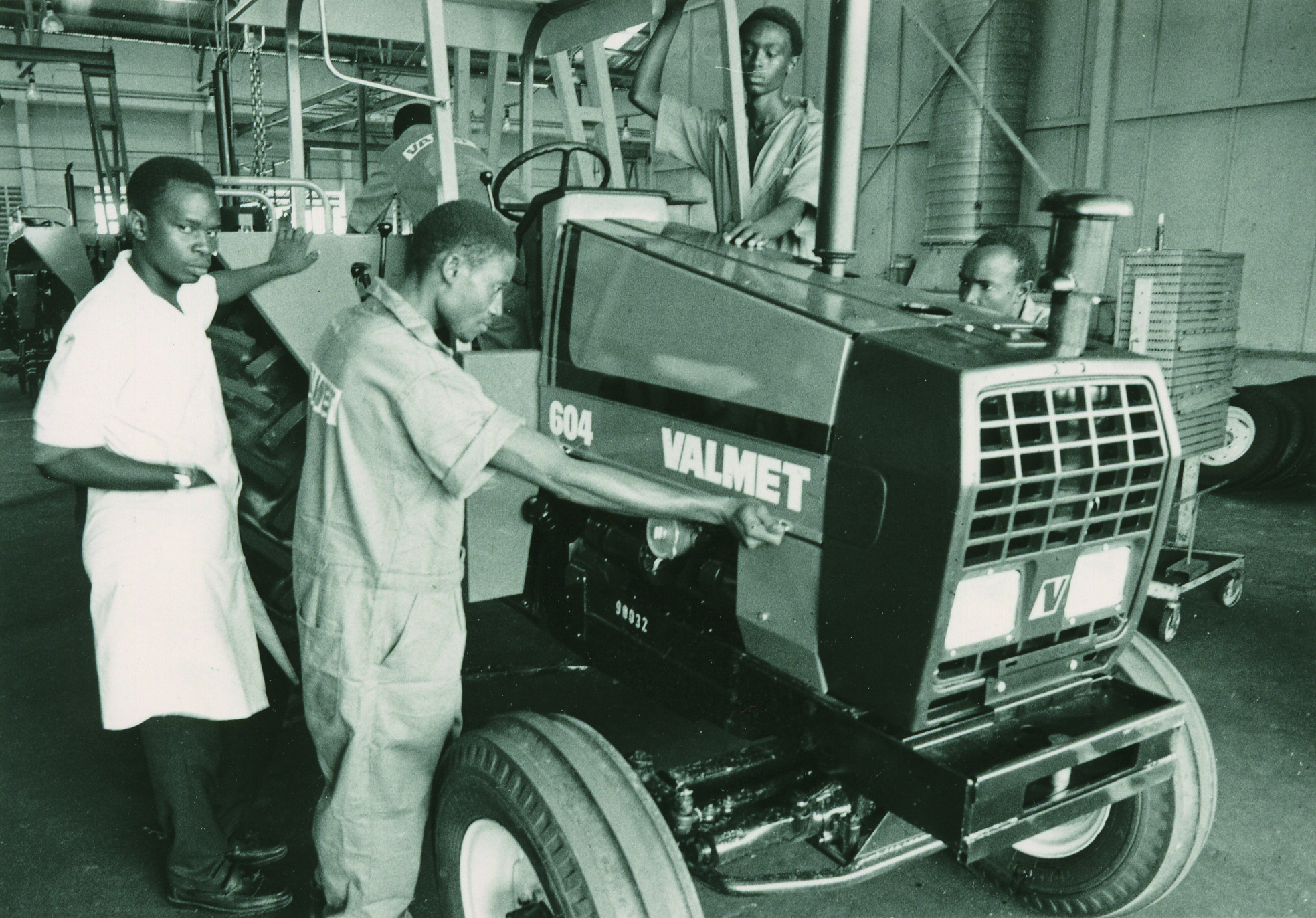
Assembly of Valmet 604 tractors in Kibaha, Tanzania factory

Valmet has also had two factories in Portugal. Between 1964 and 1967, the FAP factory produced around 700 Valmet 361 Series tractors under license in Aveiro. In 1989, Valmet Tractor S.A. was established in Portugal when it seemed likely the EU would limit sales of imported tractors through tariffs. The factory in Montijo operated from 1990 to 1997, producing around 1300 tractors in total. After Finland joined the EU the factory was no longer needed. Between 1995 and 1997 the factory in Montijo also produced tractors for the Austrian brand Steyr.

Valtra tractors have been manufactured under license in India by Eicher Tractor, which produced the Valmet 365 model and 320D engine for a few years beginning in 1997. In addition, Hema Endüstri/Hattat in Turkey has manufactured the Valtra A Series under license for the local market since 2004. Hema/Hattat has also manufactured small A Series models, sold under the Valtra brand around the world.

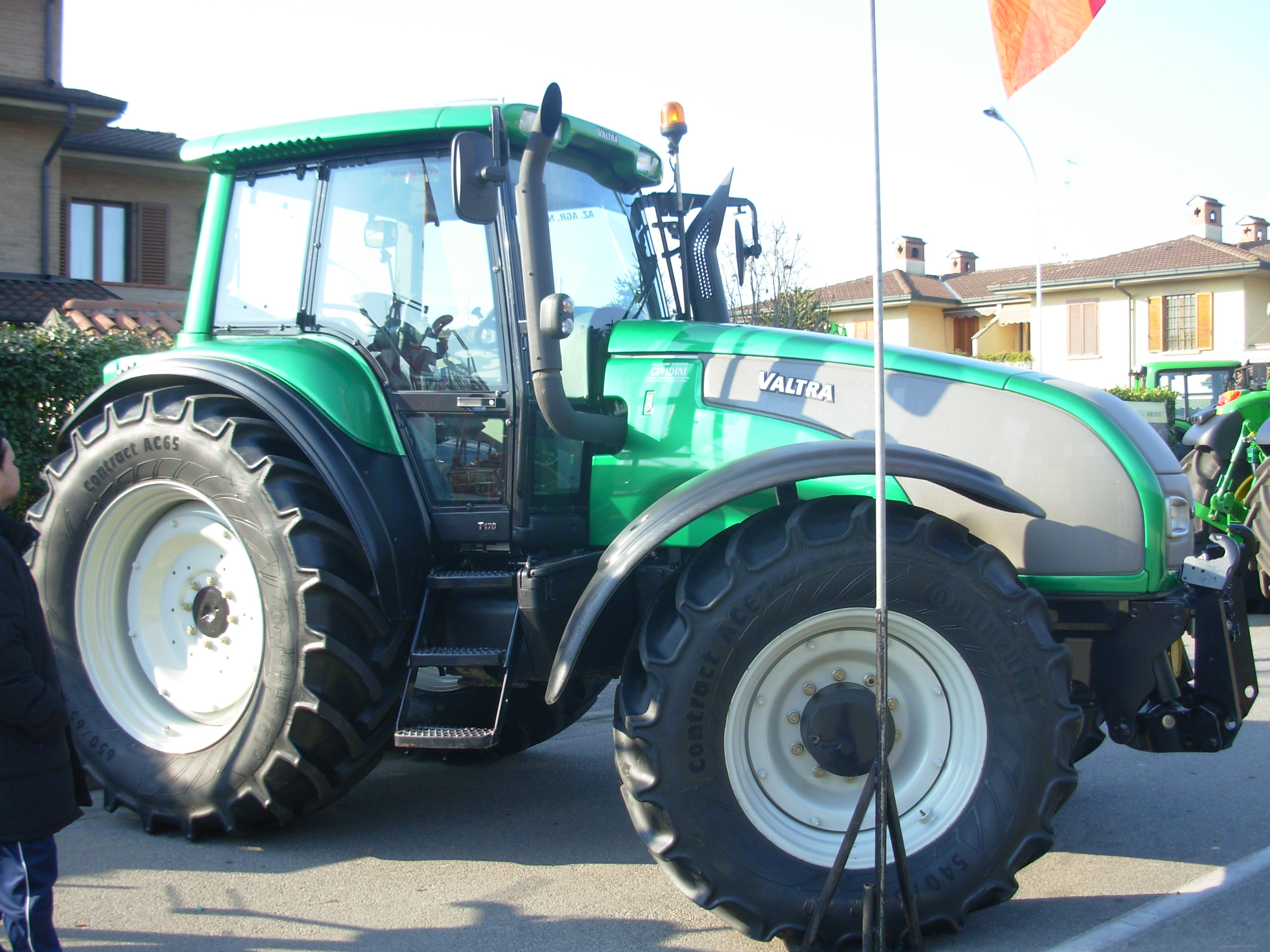
Valtra T170 tractor

Valtra in turn manufactured the Massey Ferguson 4400 Series at the Suolahti factory for a few years beginning in 2005. The MF 4400 Series was based on the Valtra A Series.

The Valtra S Series has been manufactured at the AGCO factory in Beauvais, France, since 2009. From 2003 to 2007 the S Series was manufactured at the Suolahti factory. Beginning in 1989 the Valmet 8300 and 8600 models were also manufactured in Beauvais at what was then the Massey Ferguson factory. At the same time, Massey Ferguson began using Valmet diesel engines for its own models. Agritalia in turn manufactured Valtra 3000 Series vineyard tractors in the early 2000s.

In February 2015 a Valtra tractor, driven by former World Rally Champion, Juha Kankkunen, equipped with Nokian Tyres set a new world speed record for tractors at 130.165 km/h.

== Ownership ==
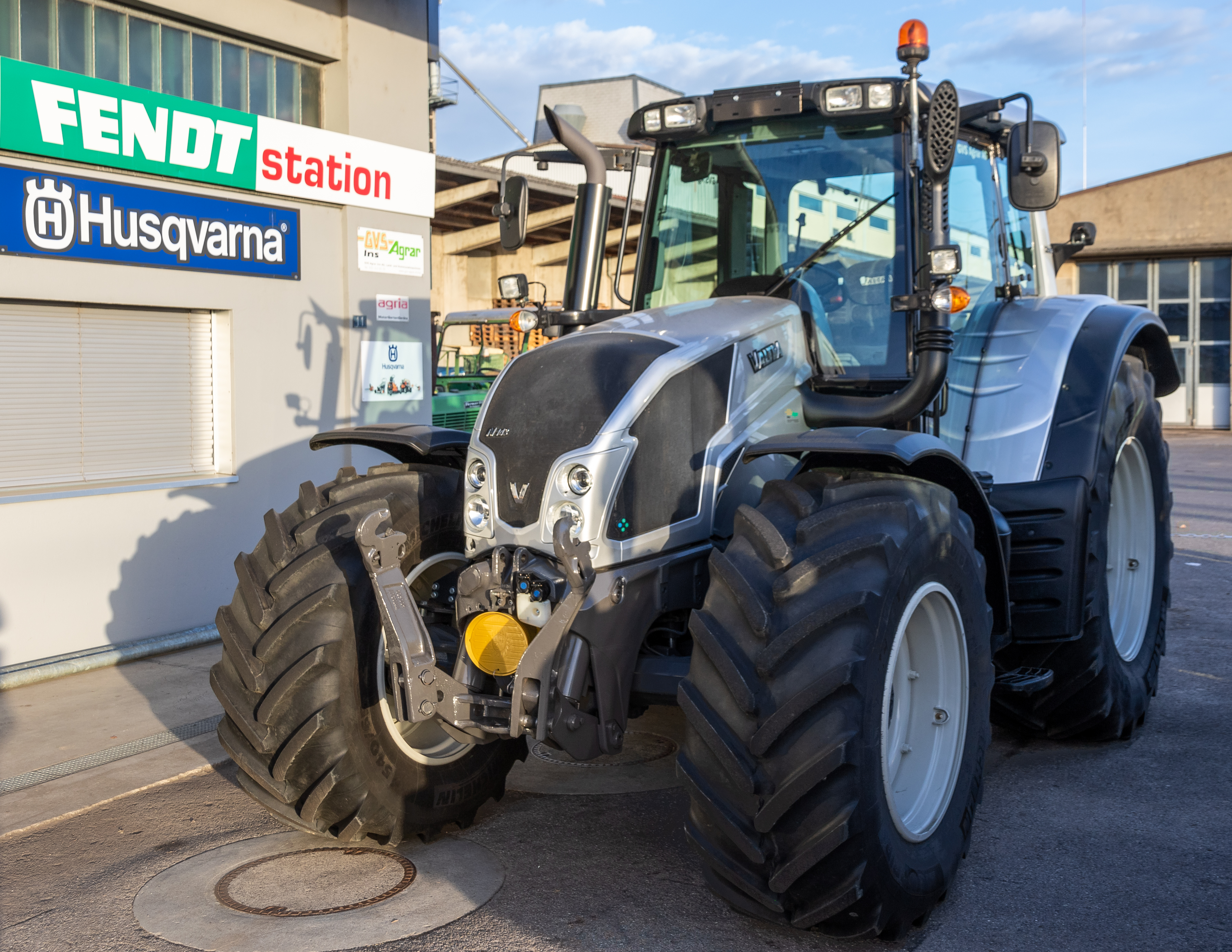
Valtra N 143

When it was founded in 1945, Valmet was a fully state-owned company. In 1994 Finnish state-owned companies were reorganised, and Valmet's tractor operations were transferred to a joint company with Sisu trucks creating the Sisu-Valmet brand.

In 1997 Sisu, including its tractor operations, was acquired by Partek. At the end of 1999 the Finnish State owned 30 percent of Partek.

In 1998 the brand name was changed from Valmet to the transition name ValtraValmet before being shortened to Valtra in 2001.

In 2002 Partek was acquired by the Kone Corporation.

In 2004 Kone Corporation sold Valtra and SisuDiesel to the American AGCO Corporation for EUR 600 million.

== Innovation ==
Valmet/Valtra has introduced numerous innovations that later became industry standards.

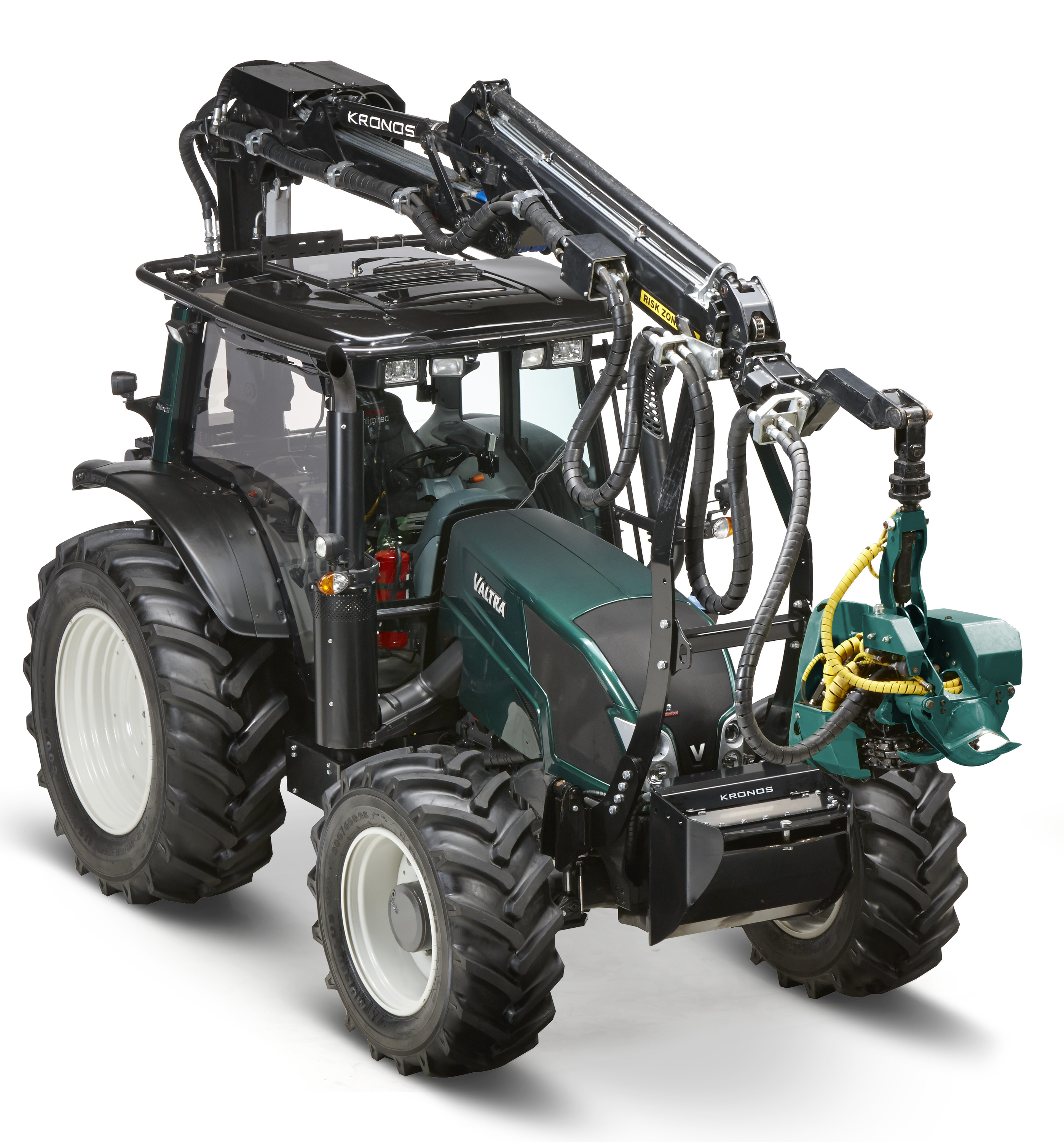
Valtra N133 HiTech5 is equipped with forest crane, steel fuel tank, narrow mudguards, cross-ply forest tyres and forest cab with TwinTrac reverse drive control.

One of the typical features of Valmet/Valtra tractors from the 1940s to the present has been their suitability for forest work. In the Nordic region tractors have traditionally been used for farming in the summer and forest work in the winter. From the 1960s to the 2000s, Valmet/Valtra tractors featured metallic fuel tanks within the subframe, where they are protected from rocks, tree stumps and branches. In the newest Valtra models the fuel tank is no longer situated inside the subframe, but forest protection is available.

Other forest specifications include a high ground clearance, a forest cab, the TwinTrac reverse-drive system, narrow mudguards, protected tyre valves and factory-fitted forest tyres. With TwinTrac, the seat, along with the armrest located controls can be turned through 180 degrees to meet a second set of foot pedals and a smaller steering wheel placed at the rear of the cab. This allows the operator to drive the tractor backwards and use rear mounted implements more efficiently. Only Fendt has provided a similar fully integrated reverse-drive system, while in other brands such devices have been post-manufacture, third party additions. Valtra is the only tractor manufacturer in the world that offers a factory-fitted reverse-drive system, which is ideal not only for forest work, but also for mowing and municipal maintenance tasks.

The Valmet 565 model introduced in 1965 featured the first synchronised gearbox in the tractor industry.

The Valmet 900 introduced in 1967 featured a factory-fitted cab and gear levers on the right-hand side of the driver.

=== Pioneer in turbocharging ===
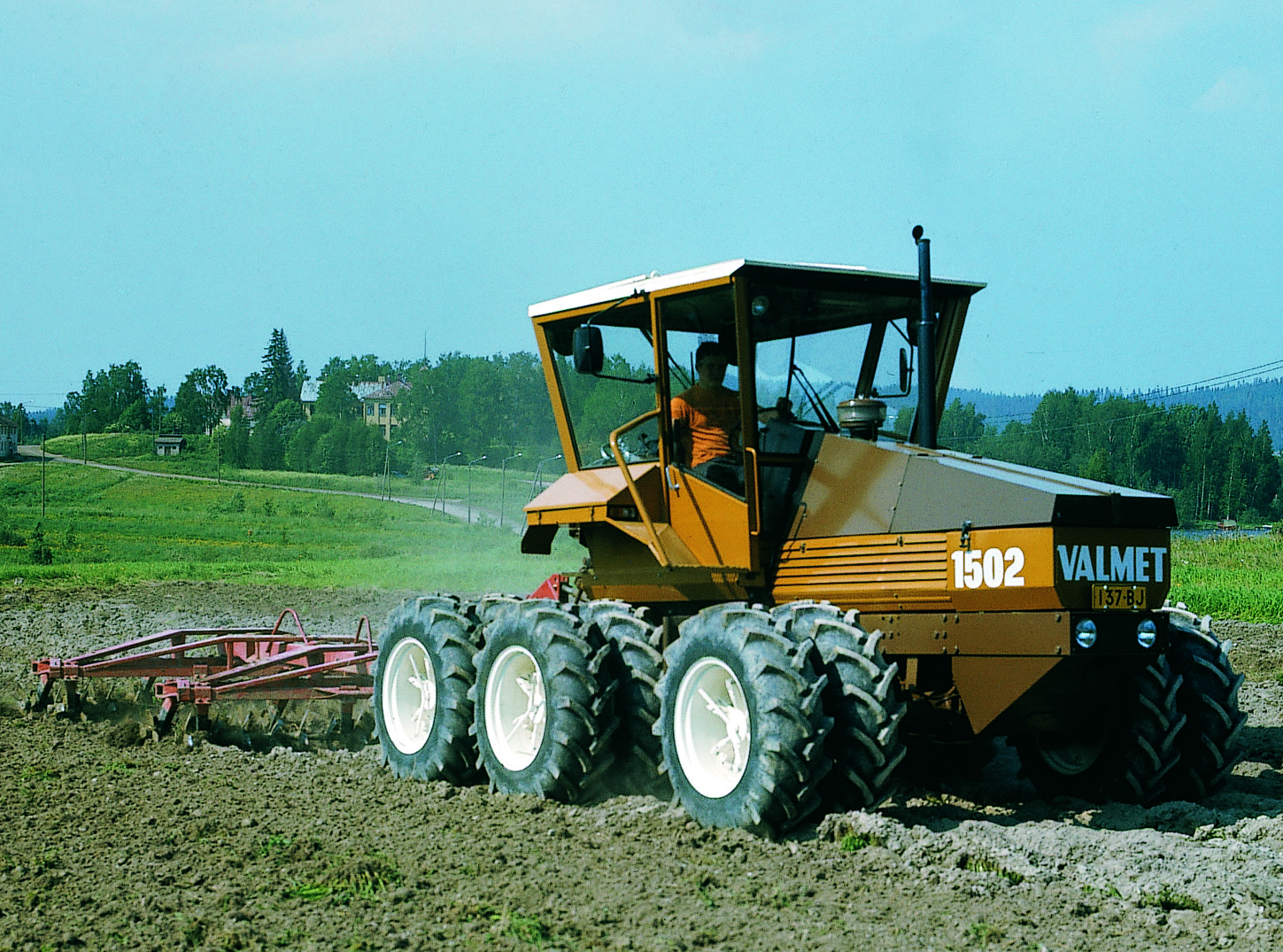
Valmet 1502 with six wheels was a very special tractor in the '70s.

Valmet and Valtra have also been pioneers in turbocharging, especially with their three- and four-cylinder engines. In 1969 Valmet introduced the world's first turbocharged four-cylinder tractor, the Valmet 1100, which produced 115 horsepower SAE. Valtra has continued the tradition of offering the most powerful four-cylinder tractors in the world with its M and N Series models, for example. Valmet also introduced the first turbocharged three-cylinder tractor engine in 1979 with the Valmet 602 Turbo model.

Among the most unusual tractors manufactured by Valmet was the six-wheeled Valmet 1502 bogie model, which was introduced in 1975.

The experimental H800 model from 1986 featured an articulated chassis and fully hydraulic transmission.

The 8750 Sigma Power model introduced by Valmet in 1996 was the first tractor in the world to feature PTO (Power Take-off for external implements) boost, which was activated automatically when at least 30 horsepower was transmitted to the PTO.

Valmet/Valtra is the only tractor manufacturer ever to have manufactured articulated tractors in the 100-200 horsepower class. The company's history of articulated tractors began with the Terra model introduced in 1965 and continued with the H800 in 1986 and the X, XM and NX models beginning in 1996.

Valtra was awarded two prestigious DLG Silver Medals at Agritechnica 2007 for its innovations. One was awarded for the Valtra LH Lift pivoting front linkage and the other for its semi-active AutoComfort cab suspension.

In 2008 Valtra was the first tractor manufacturer in the world to introduce SCR exhaust cleaning technology with its S Series. The technology had been previously used in the truck industry and has since become almost standard in the tractor industry.

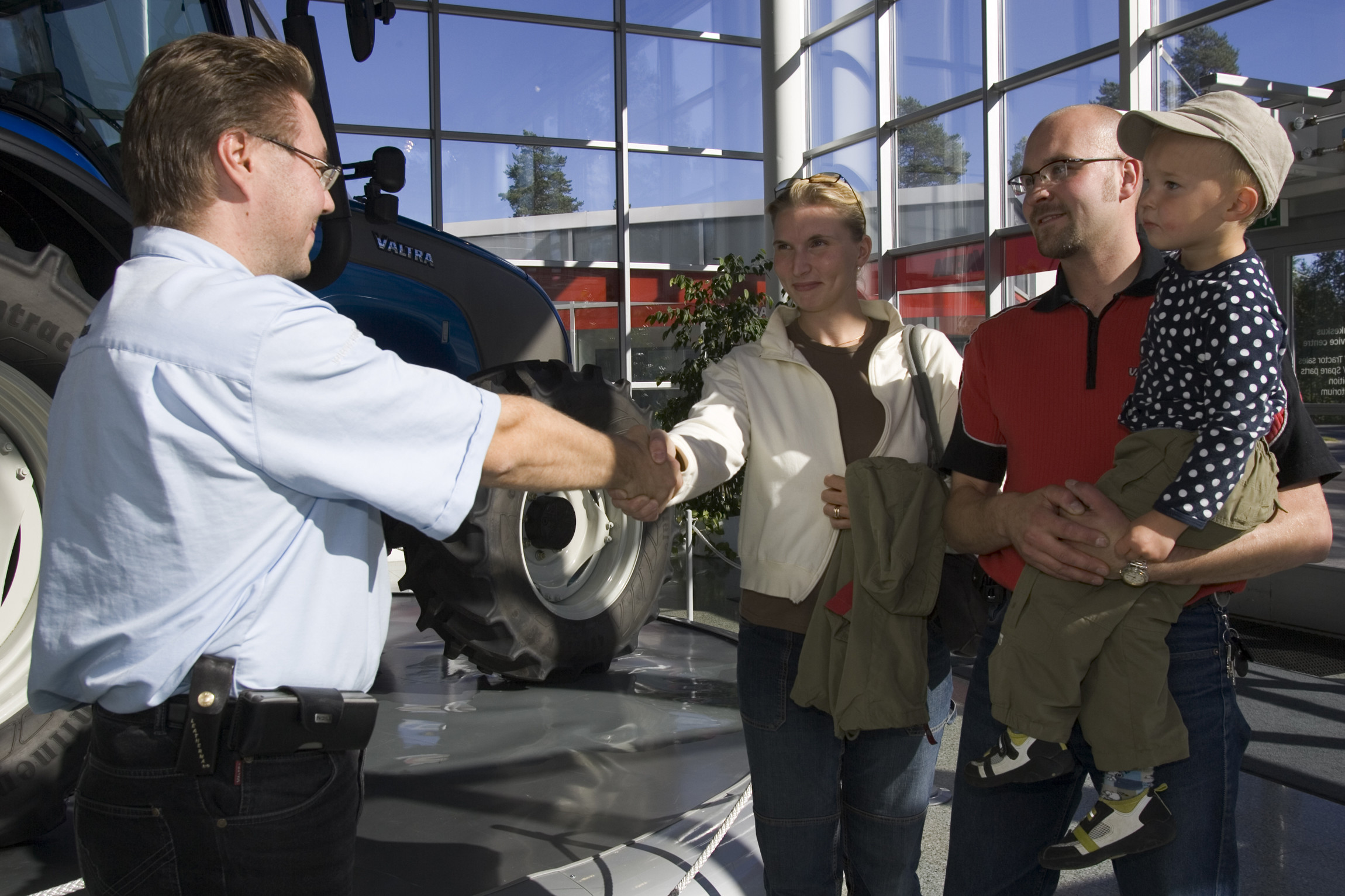
Valtra tractors are tailor-made and customers are invited to see their own tractor at the assembly line.

=== Stepless transmission ===
In 2008 Valtra introduced the stepless Direct transmission, which it had developed and manufactured itself. Unlike other continuously variable transmissions, Direct transmissions have ground-speed PTO option, are equally efficient when driven forwards and in reverse, and have separate oils for the hydraulics and transmission. Direct transmissions are very similar in design to Valtra's five-step Versu powershift transmissions.

The fourth generation T Series that was introduced in 2014 featured for the first time Valtra's patented hydraulics assistant that increases the engine speed automatically under heavy hydraulic loads. The T Series also features an automatic powershift that switches to a lower gear range when needed at a preset speed. The Valtra T Series was named Machine of the Year at SIMA, the Paris International Agri Business Show, in 2014.

In autumn 2015 Valtra introduced its ASR traction control system on the fourth generation N Series. This innovation optimises power in relation to the traction, reducing fuel consumption and avoiding damage to the ground. Valtra N Series was named Machine of the Year and awarded Tractor of the Year for the Best Design at Agritechnica exhibition 2015.

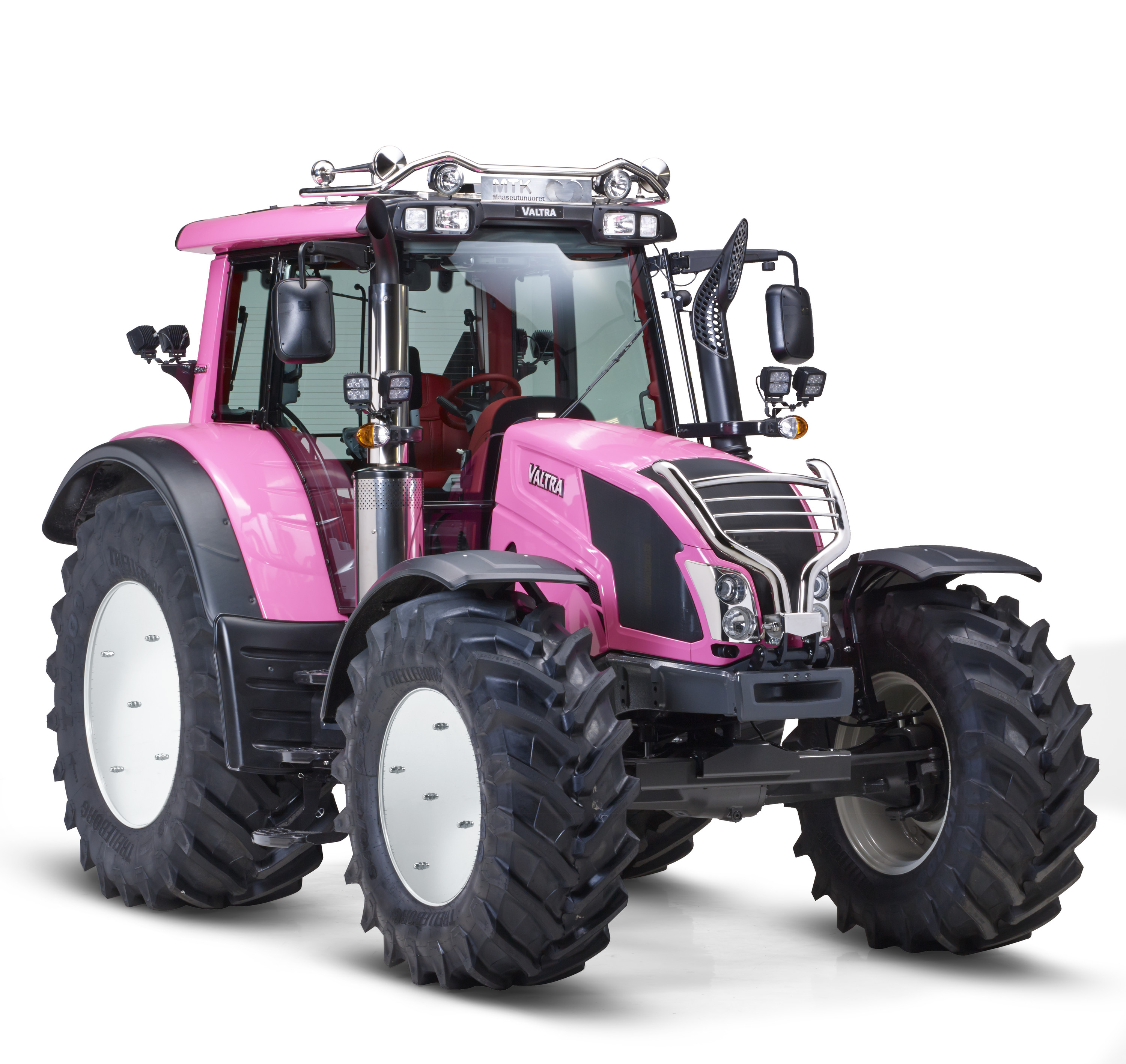
N163 Direct called "Pink Cat" was built in Unlimited Studio for Finnish Young Farmers organization.

=== Custom-built tractors ===
Since the early 1990s Valtra has had a tradition of allowing the customer to tailor the tractor to specific needs and desires, in recent years called 'a la carte'. Valtra has been the only tractor manufacturer in the world to manufacture tractors on the basis of individual customer orders only. Several options have been available pertaining to for example the tractors color, transmission type and speed, hydraulics, PTO and suspension. The Suolahti factory does not make a single tractor without an order from an importer, dealer or customer. Valtra offers a wide range of options and features, allowing customers to specify their tractors according to their own specific needs.

In 2013 the Unlimited Studio was introduced to serve the customer further in this regard, allowing the addition to the tractor of "anything within reason" as a final step in the assembly process. The Unlimited Studio allows tractors to be fitted with options that would otherwise not be possible or feasible on the regular assembly line. The 1000th Unlimited tractor was handed over in autumn 2015. The Unlimited Studio has customised 106 N163 Direct tractors for the Finnish Defence Forces, as well as the Pink Cat campaign tractor for the Young Farmers of Finland.

Fourth generation N and T Series tractors won several international tractor and design awards in 2015 and 2016 including Machine of the Year, Golden Tractor for Design, A Design Award and Red Dot design award.

== Market position ==
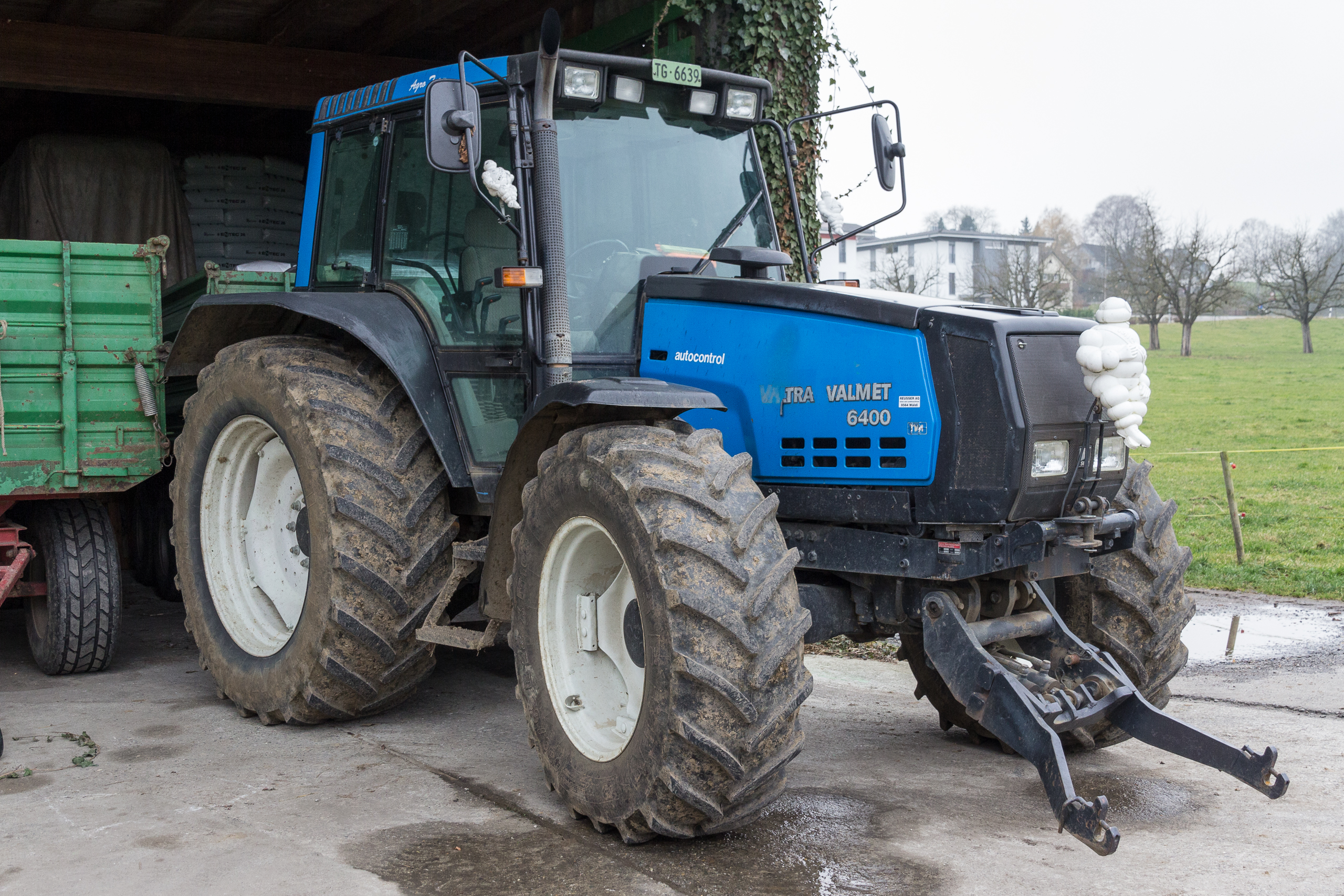
Valtra Valmet 6400

Valmet/Valtra has been the most popular tractor brand in Finland since the early 1970s and the most popular tractor brand in Scandinavia since it took over Volvo BM's tractor operations in the early 1980s. In Brazil and South America, Valmet/Valtra has been the second or third most popular tractor brand depending on the year.

In western markets, Valtra has been the fourth or fifth most popular tractor brand depending on the year. Valtra tractors are currently sold in around 75 countries around the world.

== Models ==
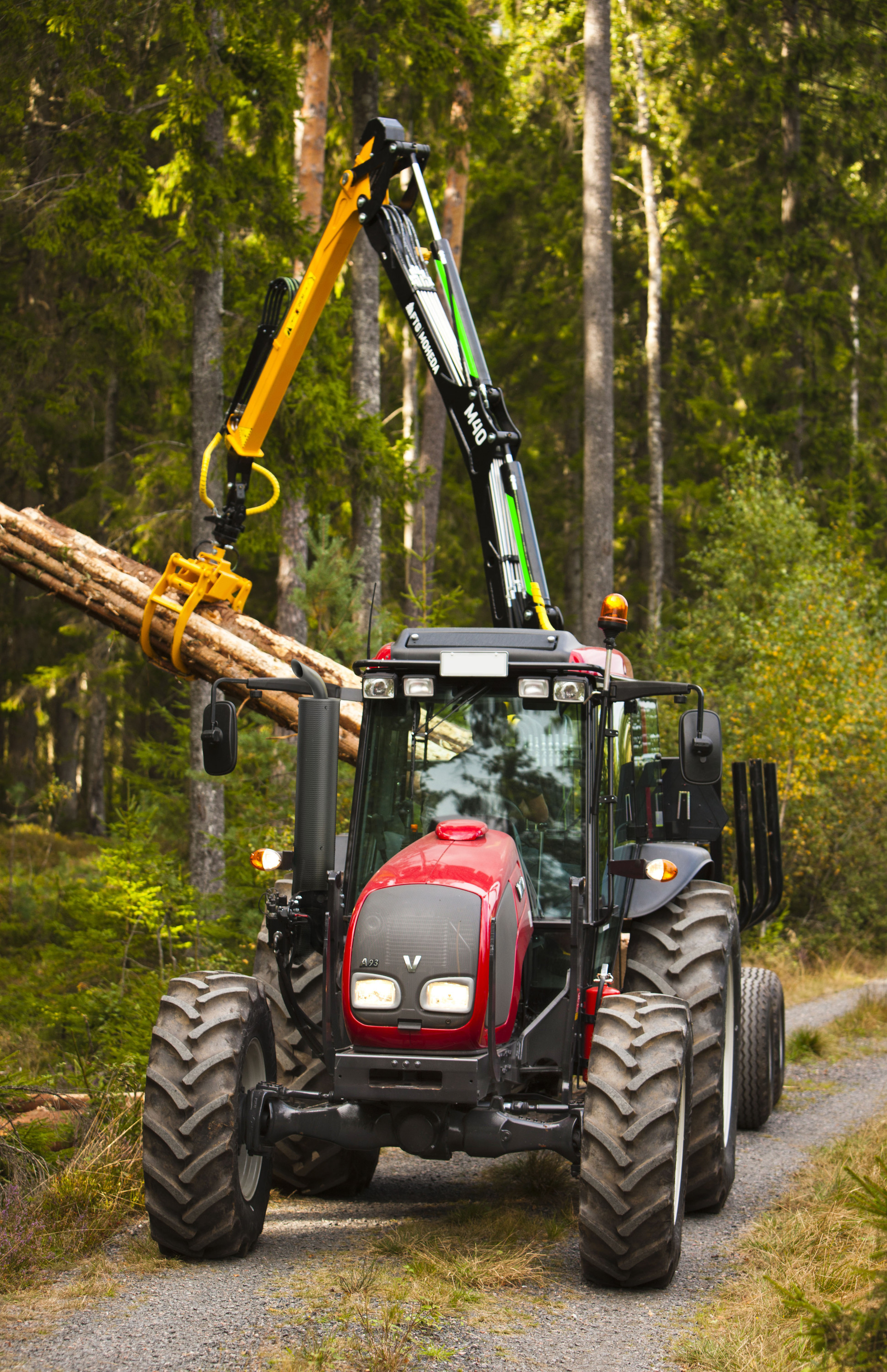
Valtra A Series tractor

Valtra tractor models being manufactured in 2015:

A Series

- A53 (50 hp /196 Nm)
- A63 (68 hp / 285 Nm)
- A73 (78 hp / 310 Nm)
- A83 HiTech (88 hp / 325 Nm)
- A93 Hitech (101 hp / 370 Nm)

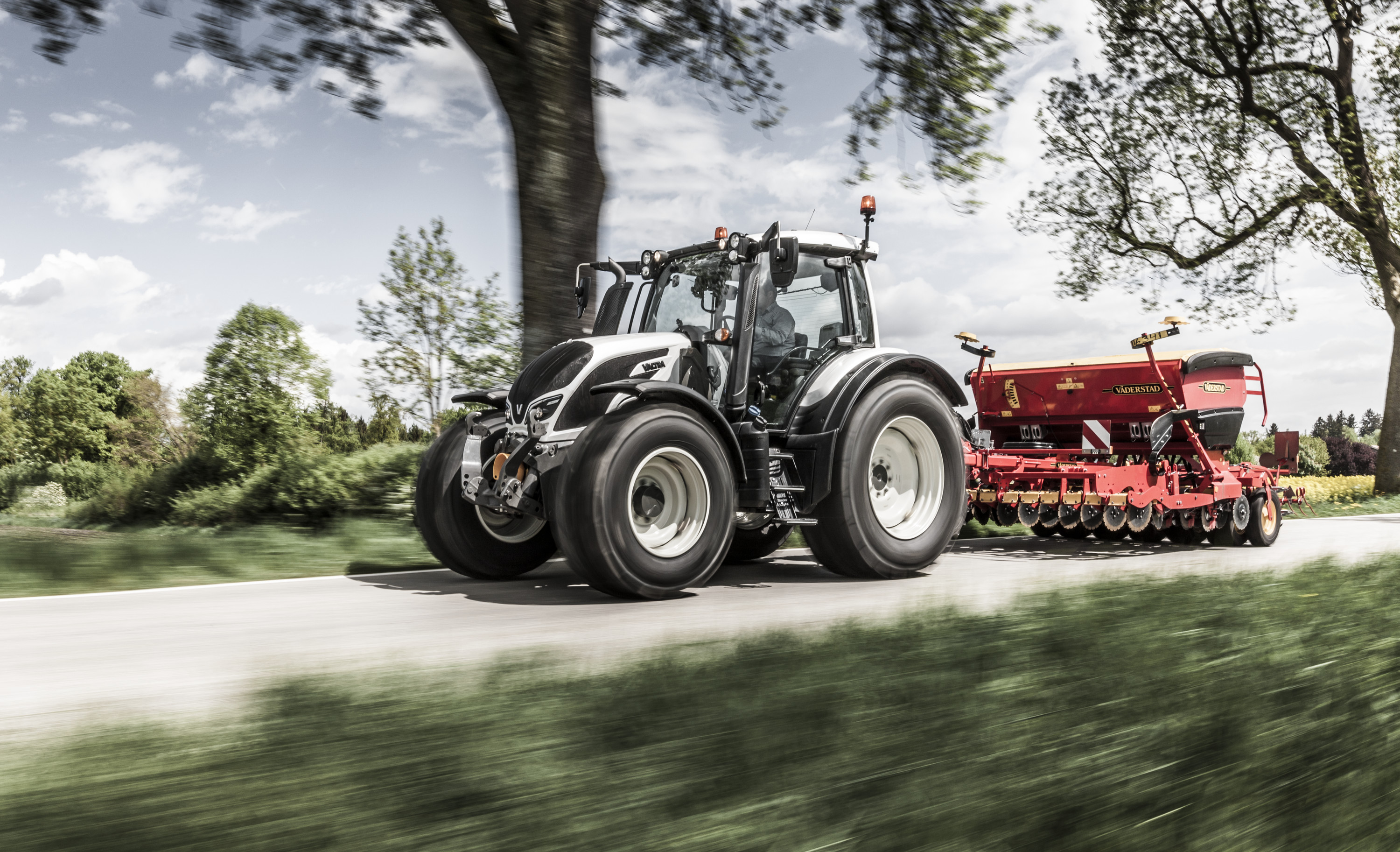
Fourth generation four-cylinder Valtra N Series tractor

N Series

- N104 HiTech (105 hp / 470 Nm)
- N114e HiTech (115 hp / 500 Nm)
- N124 HiTech (125 hp / 550 Nm)
- N134 HiTech, Active, Versu, Direct (145 hp / 600 Nm)
- N154 HiTech, Active, Versu, Direct (165 hp / 720 Nm)
- N174 HiTech, Active, Versu, Direct (185 hp / 730 Nm)

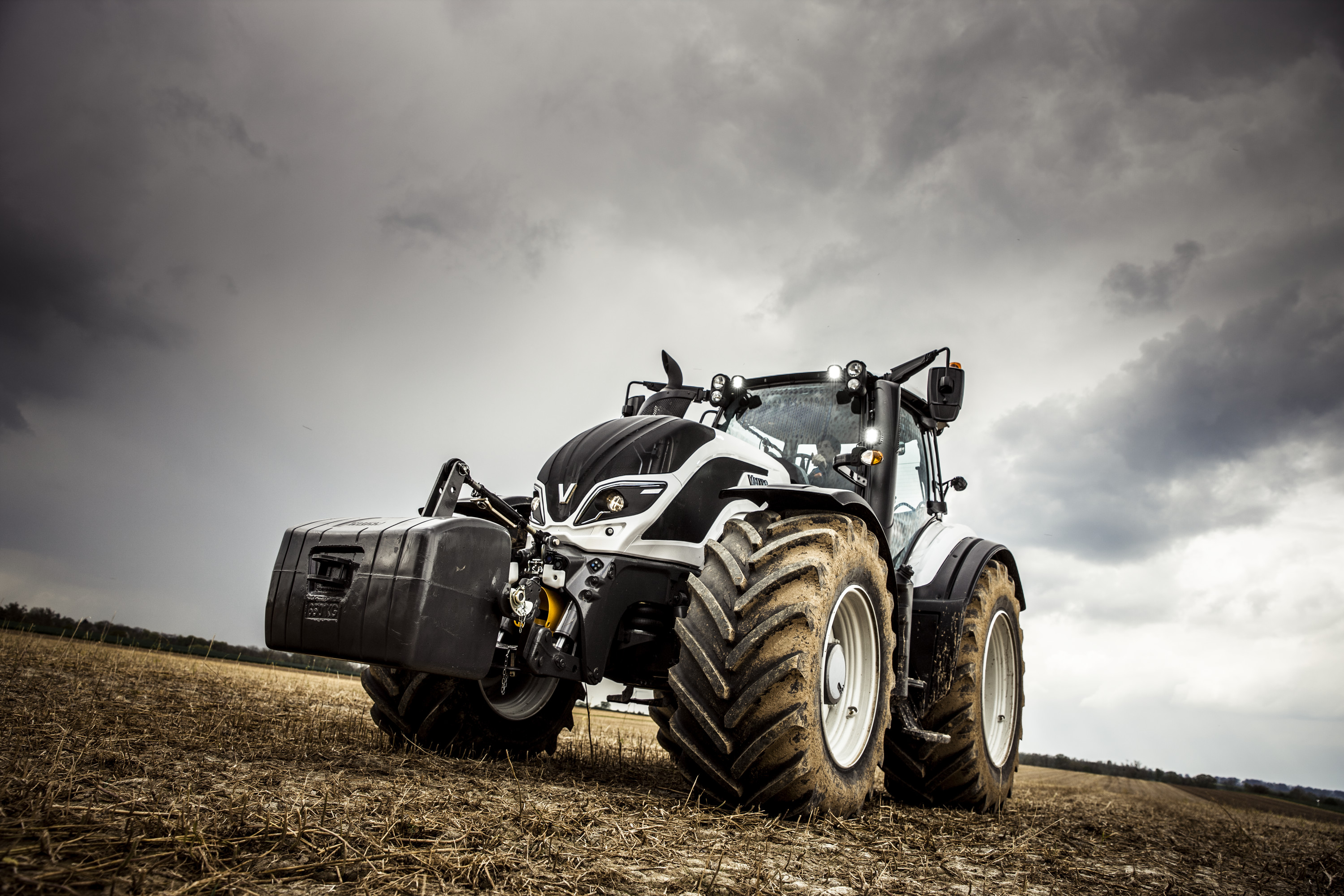
Valtra fourth generation six-cylinder T Series tractor

T Series

- T144 HiTech, Active, Versu, Direct (170 hp / 680 Nm)
- T154 HiTech, Active, Versu, Direct (180 hp / 740 Nm)
- T174e HiTech, Active, Versu, Direct (190 hp / 900 Nm)
- T194 HiTech, Active, Versu, Direct (210 hp / 870 Nm)
- T214 HiTech, Active, Versu, Direct (230 hp / 910 Nm)
- T234 HiTech, Active, Versu (250 hp / 1000 Nm)

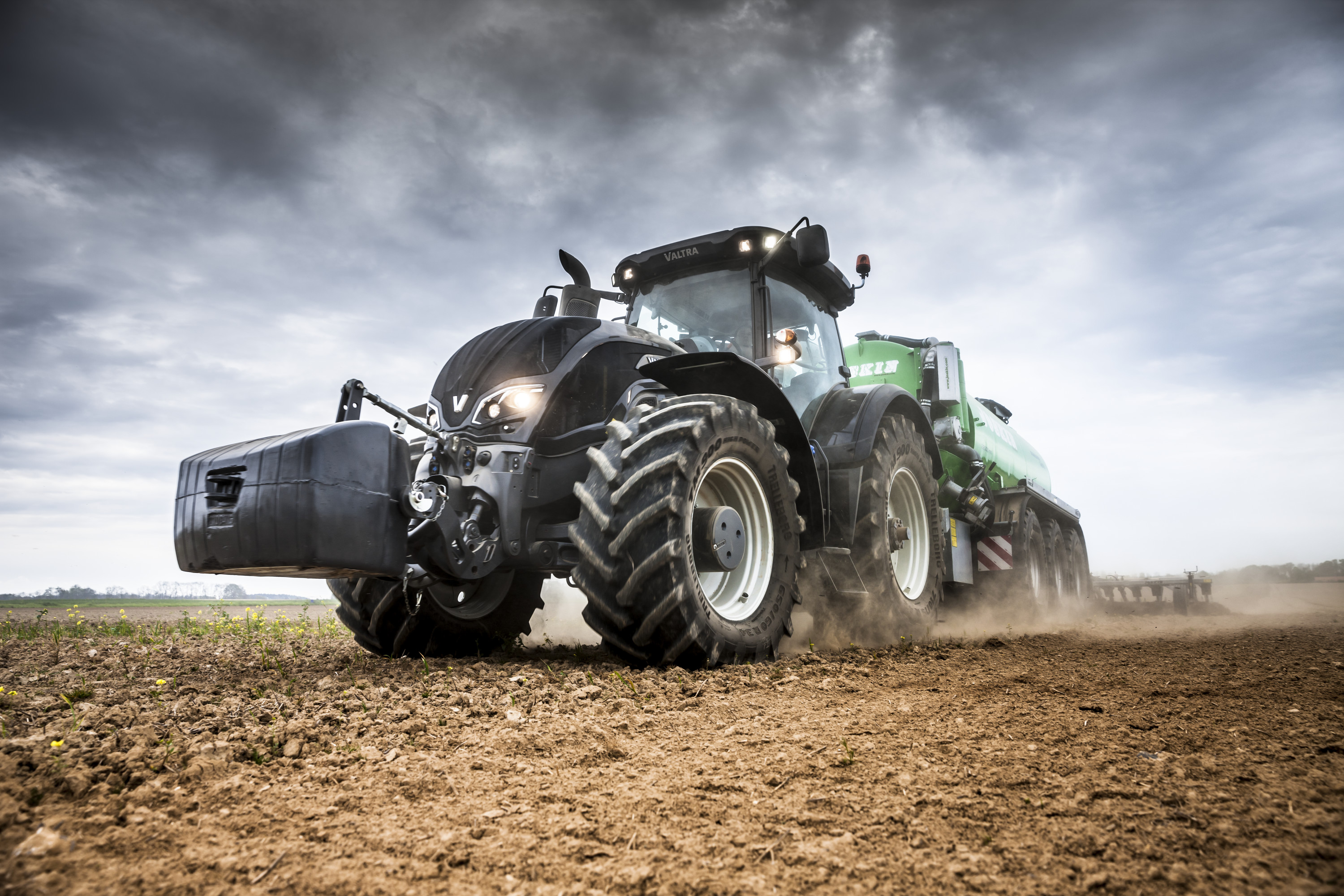
Valtra S Series tractor with up to 400 horsepower

S Series

- S274 (300 hp / 1300 Nm)
- S294 (325 hp / 1390 Nm)
- S324 (350 hp / 1500 Nm)
- S354 (380 hp / 1590 Nm)
- S374 (400 hp / 1600 Nm)

A different set of models are produced in Brazil:

- Valtra BL (65-95 hp)
- Valtra BM (100-125 hp)
- Valtra BH (145-205 hp)
- Valtra BT (150-210 hp) with higher end technology compared to BH line
- Valtra BC (Harvesters)
- Valtra BS (Sprayers)

A special series made in Argentina since 2014

- Valtra AR (140-210 cv)
