= Valmet tractor =

Finnish tractor brand

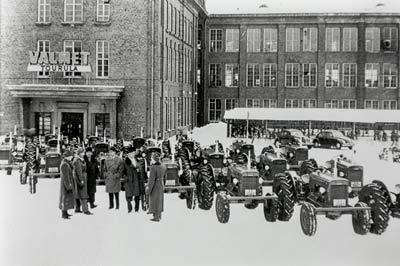
Valmet tractors at State's Rifle Factory (Valtion Kivääritehdas) in Jyväskylä, Finland in the 1950s

Valmet (originally Valtion Metallitehtaat - State Metalworks) was a company formed in 1951, when the country of Finland decided to group their various factories working on war reparations to the Soviet Union under one company, Valmet. The factories within the group produce a wide array of products including aeroplanes, road vehicles, locomotives, weapons manufacturing and everyday household appliances. Numerous parts of the company have since been sold or merged with other companies specializing in their own fields of trade and manufacture. Valmet itself was a brand of Metso Corporation, but was spun off to a separate company in December 2013. Tractors have been produced by Valmet, both in Brazil and Finland. The brand name now in use is Valtra. The tractor business, though still located in Finland, is owned by AGCO.

== All Valmet Tractor Models ==
	Model	Manufactured	Power Output	Displacement	No. of Cylinders	Fuel capacity	Year(s) Produced	Picture
Valmet	15	Finland	15 hp (11 kW)	1,414 cc (86.3 cu in)	4	29 L (6 imp gal; 8 US gal)	1952-1955	
Valmet	20	Finland	20 hp (15 kW)	1,414 cc (86.3 cu in)	4	30 L (7 imp gal; 8 US gal)	1955-1963	Valmet 20
Valmet	33 D	Finland	37 hp (28 kW)	2,685 cc (163.8 cu in)	3	40 L (9 imp gal; 11 US gal)	1957–1959	
Valmet	80	Brazil	70 hp (52 kW)	MVM	4	40 L (9 imp gal; 11 US gal)	1970s	
Valmet	205	Finland	49 hp (37 kW)	2,685 cc (163.8 cu in)	3	73 L (16 imp gal; 19 US gal)		
Valmet	255	Finland	53 hp (40 kW)	3,300 cc (201.4 cu in)	3	73 L (16 imp gal; 19 US gal)		
Valmet	305	Finland	53 hp (40 kW)	2,685 cc (163.8 cu in)	3	73 L (16 imp gal; 19 US gal)		
Valmet	355	Finland	61 hp (45 kW)	3,300 cc (201.4 cu in)	3	73 L (16 imp gal; 19 US gal)		
Valmet	359 D	Finland	37.5 hp (28.0 kW)	2,685 cc (163.8 cu in)	3	40 L (9 imp gal; 11 US gal)	1959–1960	Side view of a Valmet 359 D tractor with Sisu Auto Diesel engine
Valmet	361 D	Finland	46 hp (34 kW)	2,685 cc (163.8 cu in)	3	40 L (9 imp gal; 11 US gal)	1961–1965	1962 Valmet 361 D tractor
Valmet	365	Finland			3		1961–	
Valmet	405	Finland	61 hp (45 kW)	2,685 cc (163.8 cu in)	3	73 L (16 imp gal; 19 US gal)	1985-1989	Valmet 405 tractor
Valmet	455	Finland	67 hp (50 kW)	3,300 cc (201.4 cu in)	3	73 L (16 imp gal; 19 US gal)	1989-1994	
Valmet	465	Finland			3			
Valmet	500	Finland	49 hp (37 kW)	2,685 cc (163.8 cu in)	3	40 L (9 imp gal; 11 US gal)	1968-1971	
Valmet	502	Finland	49 hp (37 kW)	2,685 cc (163.8 cu in)	3	65 L (14 imp gal; 17 US gal)	1971-1974	
Valmet	502 S	Finland	54 hp (40 kW)					
Valmet	504	Finland	55 hp (41 kW)					
Valmet	505 Power Plus	Finland	52 hp (39 kW)					Valmet 505 with front loader
Valmet	504	Finland	49 hp (36 kW)	2,685 cc (168.8 cu in)	3	65 L (14 imp gal; 17 US gal)	1982-1985	
Valmet	555	Finland	72 hp (54 kW)	3,300 cc (201.4 cu in)	3	73 L (16 imp gal; 19 US gal)	1990-1992	
Valmet	565	Finland			3		1964–	Valmet 565 tractor in Lappeenranta, Finland
Valmet	602	Finland	58 hp (43 kW)	3,300 cc (201.4 cu in)	3	65 L (14 imp gal; 17 US gal)	1978-1982	
Valmet	602 Turbo	Finland	66 hp (49 kW)	3,300 cc (201.4 cu in)	3	65 L (14 imp gal; 17 US gal)	1980-1982	
Valmet	604	Finland	61 hp (44 kW)	3,300 cc (201.4 cu in)	3			Four-wheel drive Valmet 604
Valmet	604 Turbo	Finland	66 hp (49 kW)	3,300 cc (201.4 cu in)	3			
Valmet	605	Finland	77 hp (57 kW)	3,300 cc (201.4 cu in)	3	180 L (40 imp gal; 48 US gal)	1983-1984	Valmet 605
Valmet	605 Power Plus	Finland	79 hp (59 kW)	3,300 cc (201.4 cu in)	3	180 L (40 imp gal; 48 US gal)	1984-1989	
Valmet	655 Power Plus	Finland	88 hp (66 kW)					
Valmet	655T Power Plus	Finland	90 hp (67 kW)					
Valmet	665	Finland	89 hp (66 kW)		4			Sisu-Valmet 665
Valmet	604 T	Finland						
Valmet	700	Finland	70 hp (52 kW)	3,980 cc (242.9 cu in)	4	70 L (15 imp gal; 18 US gal)	1968-1969	Valmet 700
Valmet	700 Mk2	Finland	75 hp (56 kW)	4,180 cc (255.1 cu in)	4	70 L (15 imp gal; 18 US gal)	1969–1973	
Valmet	702	Finland	75 hp (56 kW)	4,400 cc (268.5 cu in)	4	97 L (21 imp gal; 26 US gal)	1977–1980	
Valmet	702 (B-moottorillinen)	Finland						
Valmet	702 S	Finland						
Valmet	703	Finland	73 hp (54 kW)				1977–1979	
Valmet	705 Power Plus	Finland	84 hp (63 kW)					
Valmet	755 Power Plus	Finland						
Valmet	802	Finland					1980–1983	
Valmet	803	Finland	83 hp (62 kW)				1980–1983	
Valmet	805 Power Plus	Finland						
Valmet	855 Power Plus	Finland						
Valmet	864	Finland					1960	
Valmet	865	Finland			4		1996-1997	
Valmet	900	Finland	79 hp (59 kW)	4,180 cc (255.1 cu in)	4	100 L (22 imp gal; 26 US gal)	1967-1973	
Valmet	903	Finland	93 hp (69 kW)	4,400 cc (268.5 cu in)	4	100 L (22 imp gal; 26 US gal)	1980–1982	
Valmet	905 Power Plus	Finland	167 hp (124 kW)					
Valmet	1100	Finland	110 hp (82 kW)	4,180 cc (255.1 cu in)	4	96 L (21 imp gal; 25 US gal)	1969-1974	
Valmet	1102	Finland	112 hp (84 kW)				1980–1982	
Valmet	1103	Finland	113 hp (84 kW)					
Valmet	1203	Finland	123 hp (92 kW)					
Valmet	1502	Finland	145 hp (108 kW)	6,600 cc (402.7 cu in)	6	180 L (40 imp gal; 47 US gal)	1975-1980	
Valmet	4035 P	Finland						
Valmet	6000	Finland	85 hp (63 kW)					
Valmet	6100	Finland	89 hp (66 kW)					
Valmet	6200	Finland	90 hp (67 kW)					
Valmet	6300	Finland	92 hp (69 kW)	4,399 cc (268.4 cu in)	4	165 L (36 imp gal; 44 US gal)	1991–2007	
Valmet	6400	Finland	95 hp (71 kW)	4,399 cc (268.4 cu in)	4	165 L (36 imp gal; 44 US gal)	1991–2003	Valmet 6400 with a forestry roll cage
Valmet	6600	Finland	99 hp (74 kW)					
Valmet	6800	Finland	105 hp (78 kW)					
Valmet	6900	Finland	110 hp (82 kW)					
Valmet	8000	Finland	115 hp (86 kW)					
Valmet	8050	Finland	119 hp (89 kW)					Valmet 8050
Valmet	8100	Finland	122 hp (91 kW)					
Valmet	8100 TS	Finland	125 hp (93 kW)				.	
Valmet	8150	Finland	125 hp (93 kW)		6			
Valmet	8200	Finland	130 hp (97 kW)					
Valmet	8350	Finland	130 hp (97 kW)					
Valmet	8400	Finland	140 hp (104 kW)	6,598 cc (402.6 cu in)	6	165 L (36 imp gal; 44 US gal)	1993–1996	
Valmet	8450	Finland	149 hp (111 kW)		6			
Valmet	8550	Finland	160 hp (119 kW)		6			
Valmet	8600	Finland	155 hp (116 kW)		6			
Valmet	8750	Finland	160 hp (119 kW)		6			
Valmet	8800	Finland	165 hp (123 kW)		6			
Valmet	8850	Finland	172 hp (128 kW)		6			
Valmet	8950	Finland	200 hp (149 kW)		6			

== Picture gallery ==
=== Brazilian Valmet tractors ===
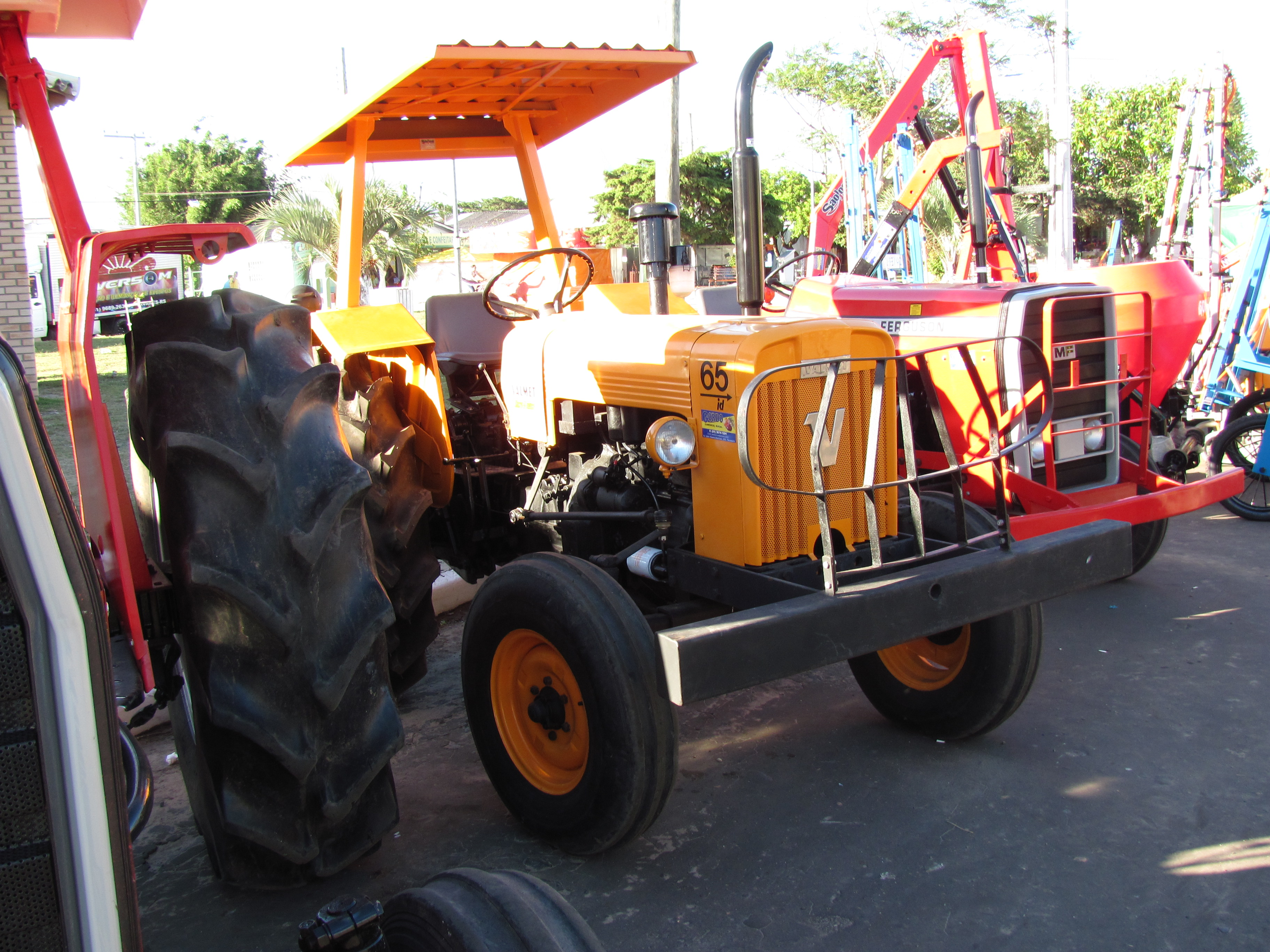
Valmet 65

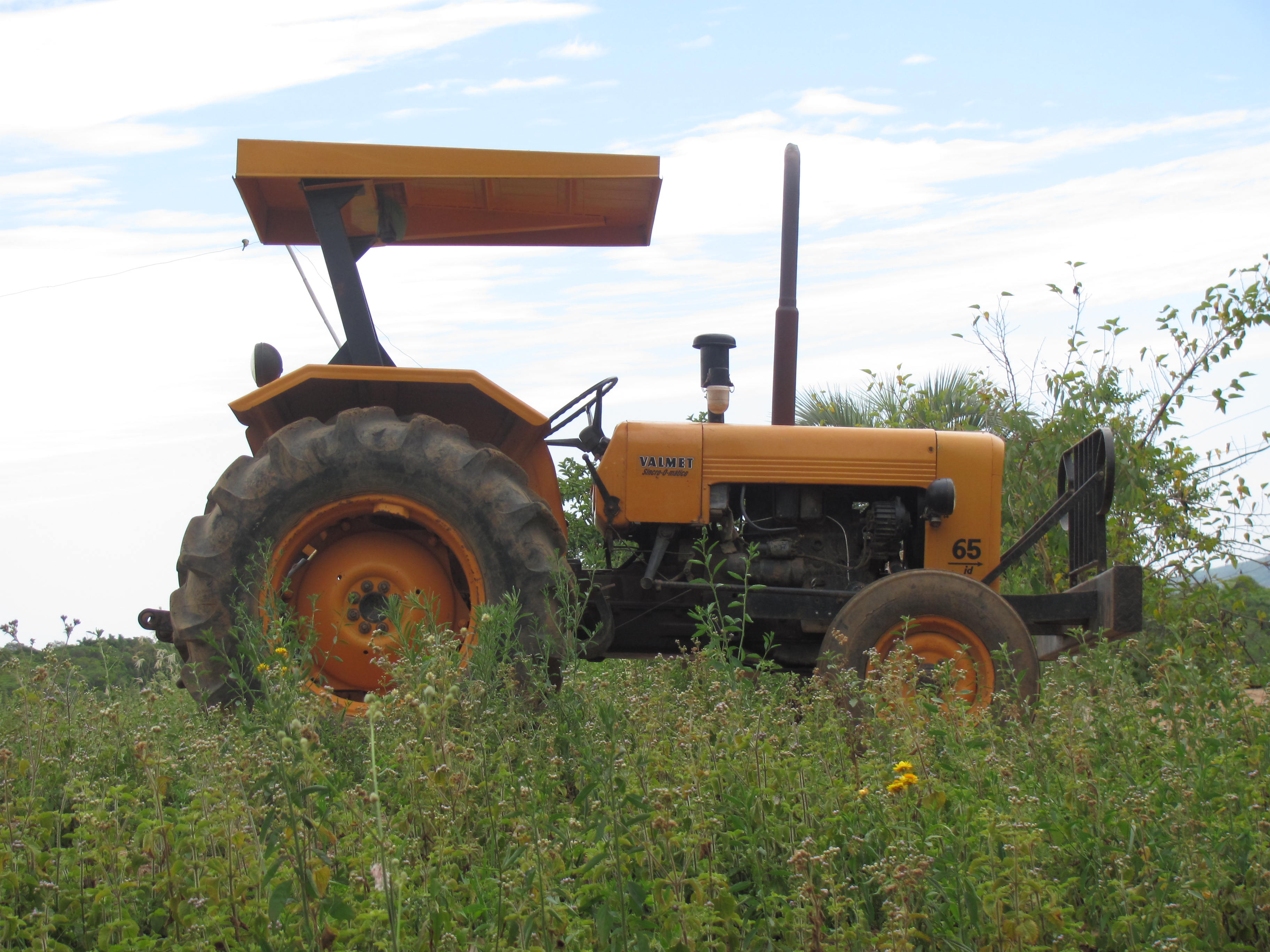
Valmet 65

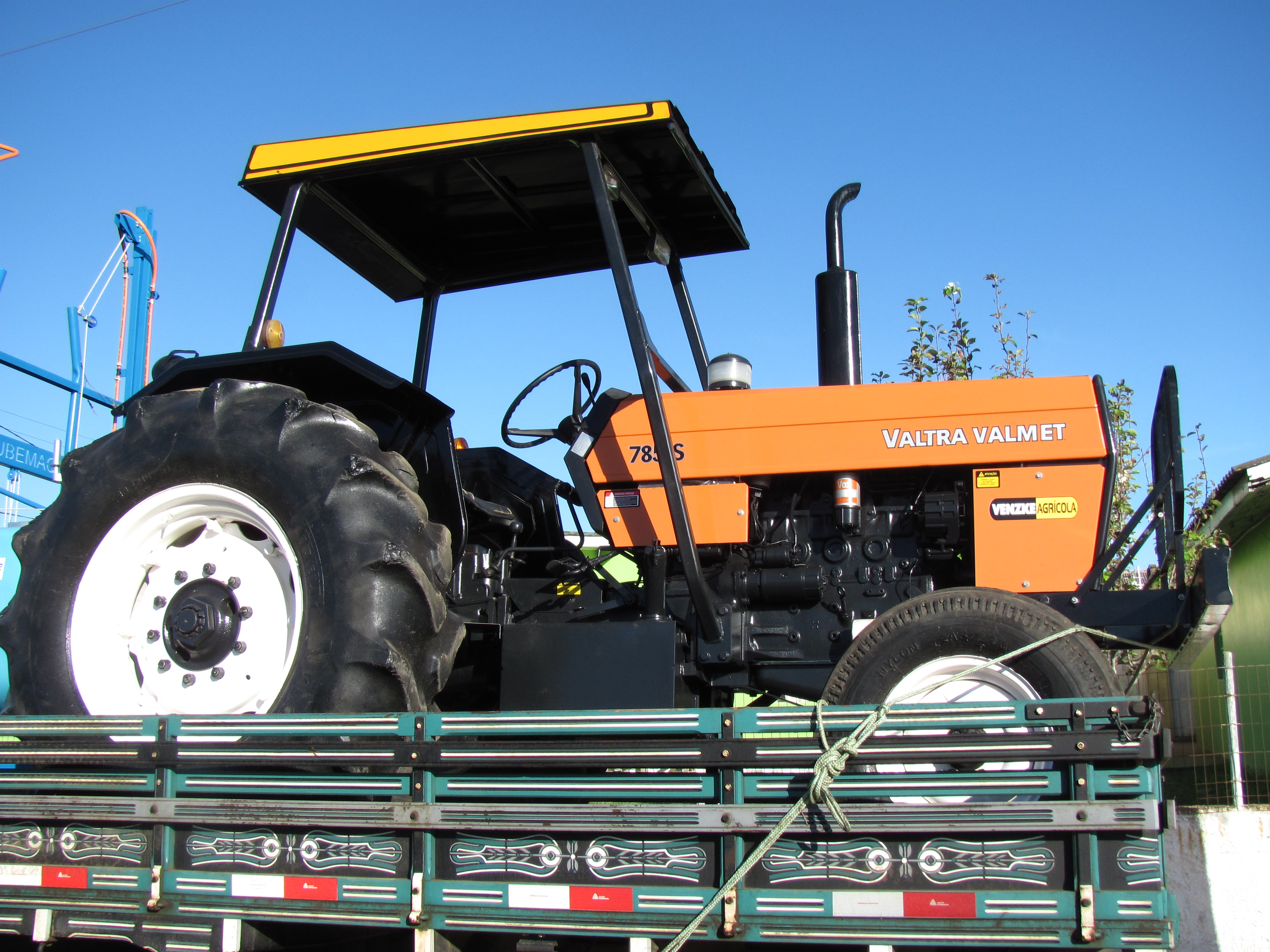
Valmet 785S

=== Valmet logos ===
Valmet logo

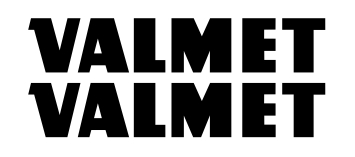
Valmet logo

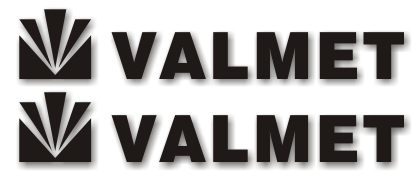
Valmet logo

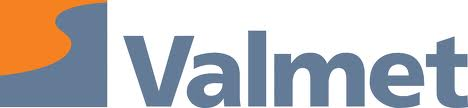
Valmet logo

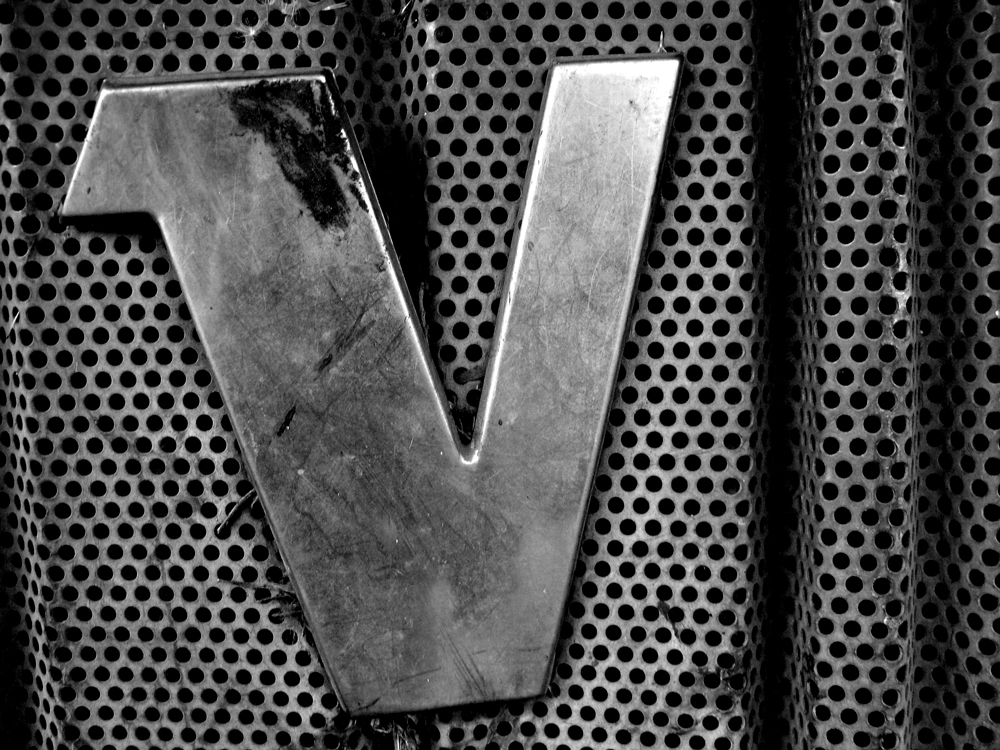
Valmet logo

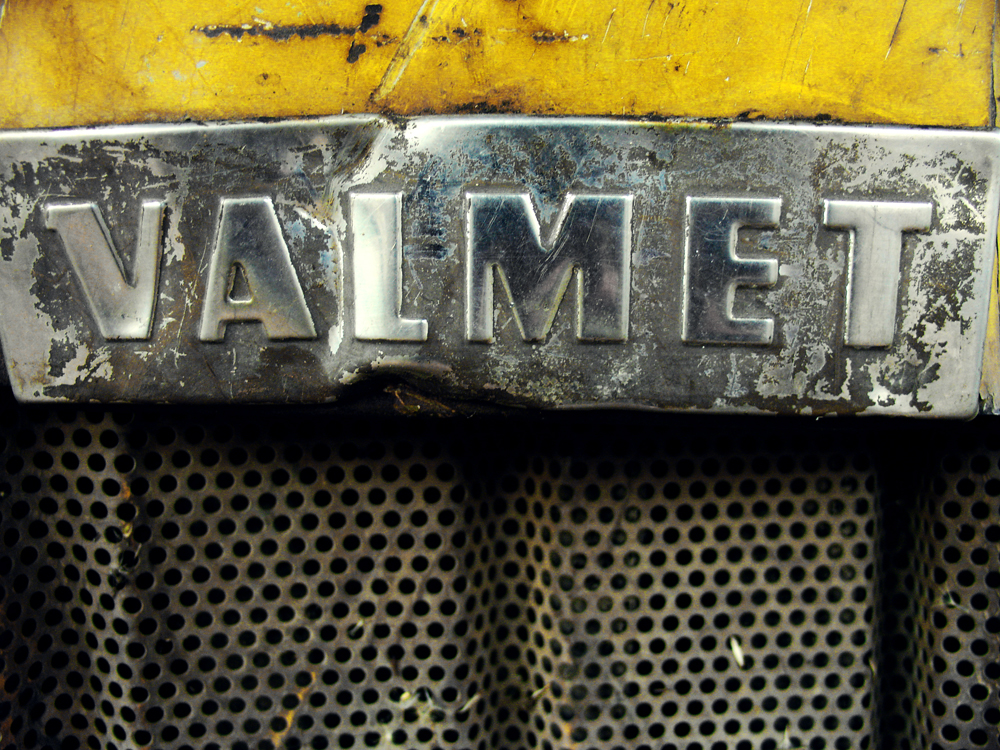
Valmet logo
