= Challenger Tractor =

Agriculture tractor brand

Challenger
- Industry: Agricultural machinery
- Founded: 1986
- Headquarters: Jackson, Minnesota, United States
- Area served: Worldwide
- Products: Tractors
- Parent: AGCO
- Website: https://dev-consent.agcocorp.com/content/challenger-ag/en_US.html

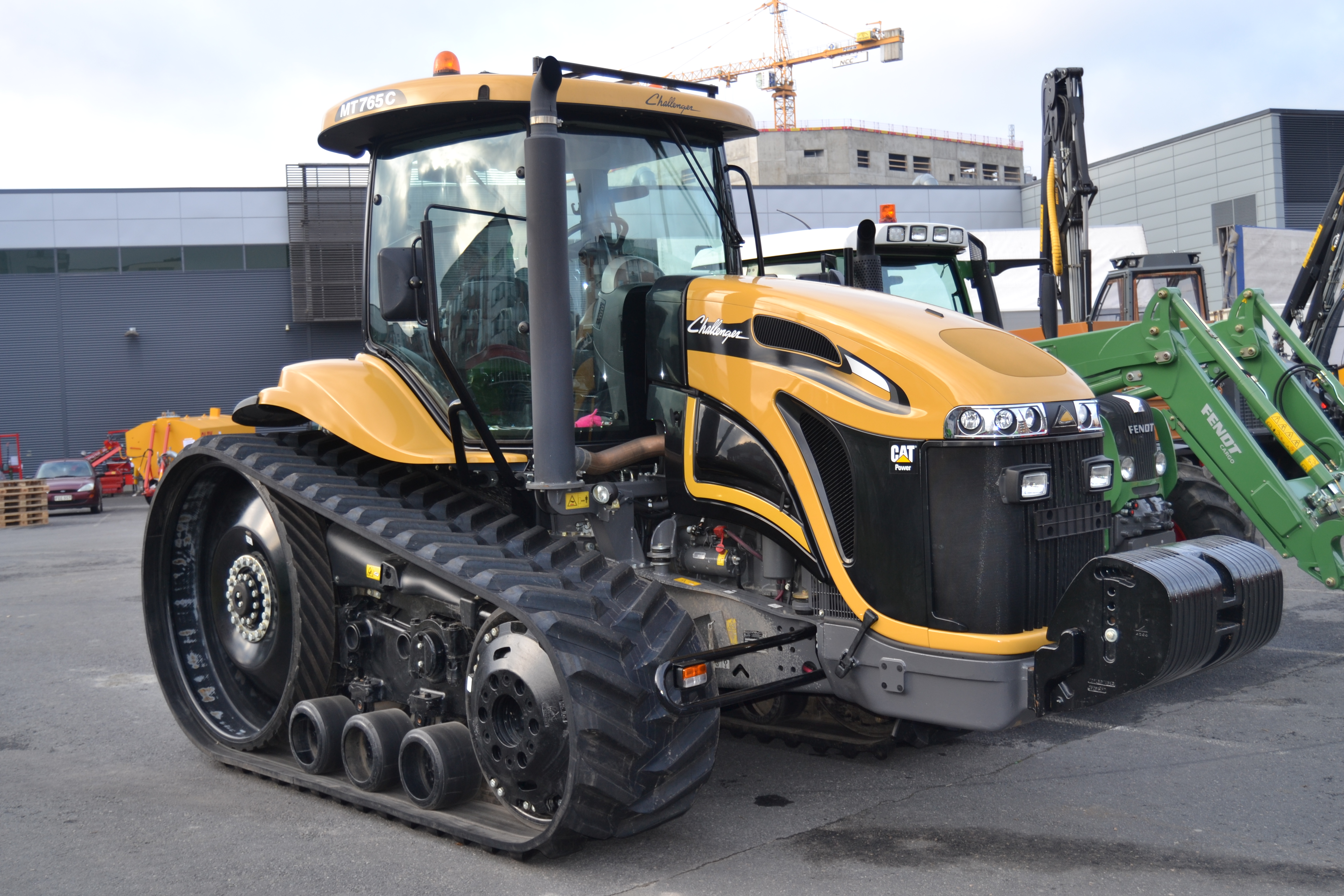
A Challenger MT765C tractor

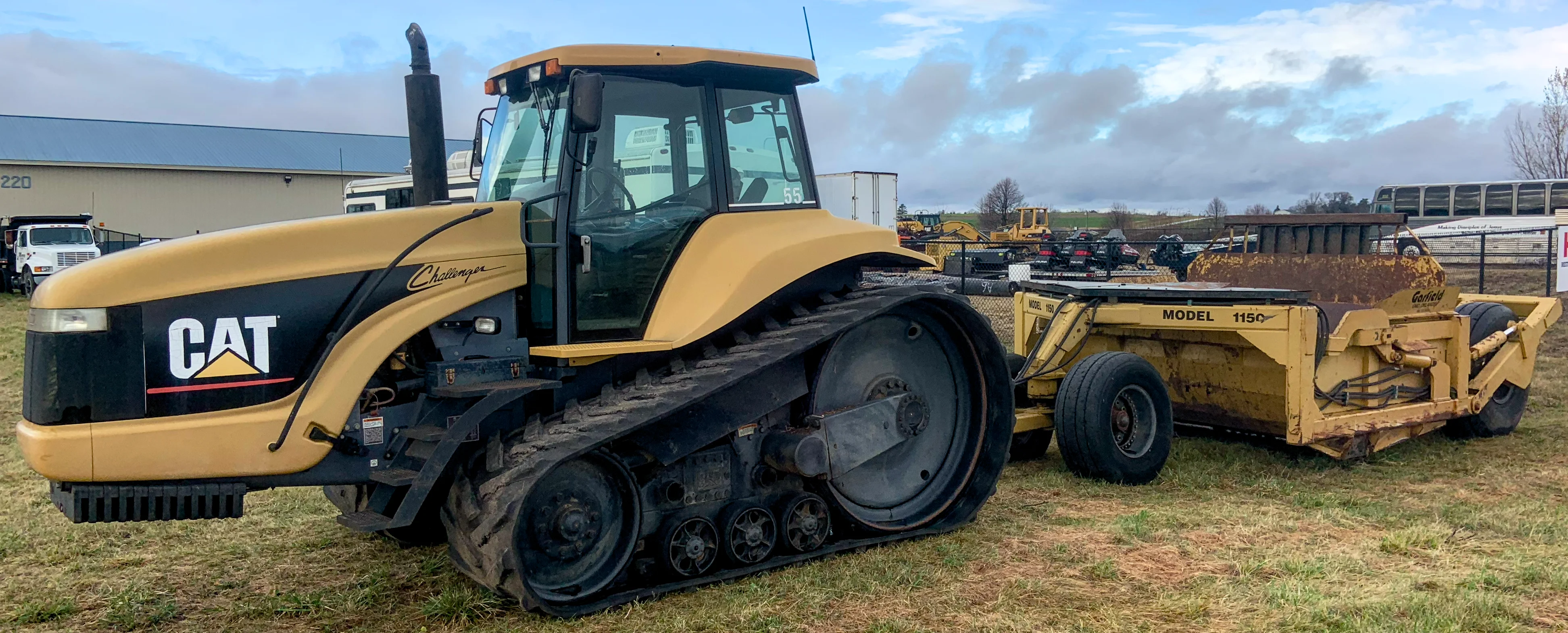
Challenger tractor with a scraper pan behind

Challenger is an American brand of agricultural tractors. Created in 1986 by Caterpillar Inc., the brand was sold to AGCO in 2002. Since then, Challenger tractors have been manufactured at the company's Jackson, Minnesota facility.

== Production models ==
=== Origins ===
The original model was the Challenger 65 featuring the Mobile-Trac System (MTS) consisting of rubber tracks and a suspension system. Although marketed as the world's first rubber-tracked agricultural tractor, a company using surplus equipment inspired by the design of military tanks had produced a considerable number of rubber tracked tank tractors. The MTS combined the flotation and traction of steel tracks with the versatility of rubber tires. The use of tracks gave the machines increased tractive performance compared to traditional four wheel drive tractors equipped with tires. The Challenger 65 began as a 270 gross hp (200 kW) machine used primarily for heavy tillage.

=== Late 20th century ===
In 1995 Caterpillar introduced the first "row crop" tracked machines with the Challenger 35, 45 and 55. These machines ranged in power from 130 KW PTO to 168 KW and were designed to be used for a variety of tasks the larger machines could not. The Challenger tracked tractor was produced by Caterpillar at their Dekalb, Illinois location until the Challenger name and all of its associated agricultural assets were sold to AGCO. During the late 1990s, the Challenger 65B was introduced. This was an upgraded version of the 65 model. It retained the bulk of the original’s specifications except for the system improvements that increased reliability.

=== Early 21st century ===
Since 2002, when the brand was purchased by AGCO, Challenger tractors have been manufactured at the company's Jackson, Minnesota facility. At the time AGCO purchased the Challenger brand most Challenger dealers were also Caterpillar construction equipment dealers. Although AGCO has shifted focus of the Challenger tractor to the agricultural market, the construction market is still an important sector for the tractors as AGCO still manufactures specially configured machines for use with pull-type earth moving equipment.

The Caterpillar Challenger MT875B was the most powerful production tractor available during its span with 430 kW gross (580 hp) engine power. In 2007, the MT875B broke the world record for most land tilled in 24 hours with a custom-made, 14 metres (46 ft) disc harrow fabricated by Grégoire Besson. It tilled 644 hectares (1,590 acres). The tractor consumed 4.42 litres per hectare (0.393 imp gal/acre) diesel fuel.

The production of Challenger tractors expanded for a time to include both tracked and wheeled type tractors, which were available in either row-crop or flotation type configurations depending upon the preference of the customer. Since their purchase in 2002, the Challenger brand has used a Caterpillar diesel engine in the majority of their models. However, with the introduction of the D series of each tractor model, AGCO began implementing the use of AGCO Power branded engines that are Tier 4i/Stage 3B emission compliant by using e^{3}, a Selective Catalytic Reduction system which injects urea in engine's exhaust gas stream to reduce nitrogen oxides and particulate matter emitted to the atmosphere.

As of 2023, only tracked tractors in the 700 Series (MT738, MT740, and MT743 models) and 800 Series (MT851, MT856, MT862, and MT865 models) are in production. AGCO phased out the Challenger brand starting in 2020. Production ended in 2024. Additionally, the Rogator application machine is now produced and sold under AGCO's Fendt brand name.
