= AGCO Power =

Finnish engine manufacturer

AGCO Power Inc.
- Native name: AGCO Power Oy
- Formerly: AGCO Sisu Power; Sisu Diesel
- Type: Limited company (osakeyhtiö)
- Industry: Manufacturing
- Founded: 1942; 84 years ago in Nokia, Finland
- Headquarters: Nokia, Finland
- Products: Engines
- Parent: AGCO
- Website: www.agcopower.com

AGCO Power Inc. (natively AGCO Power Oy, earlier AGCO Sisu Power and Sisu Diesel) is a Finnish company owned by AGCO Corporation. The company is located in Nokia, Finland, and it manufactures, for example, diesel engines for agricultural machinery.

== History ==
=== 1942–2003 ===
The company originated from a unit at Valmet's Linnavuori plant. It was located in Linnavuori, Nokia, which had been used as a fortress between 1000 and 1300. Work began on excavating the site for the factory in 1942, and the factory's first products were released two years later. The factory began manufacturing diesel engines under license from the Swedish company June-Munktell, but by 1946 it had already started manufacturing its own engines.

In 1991, the factory introduced a completely new diesel engine model. Valmet established its first engine production unit outside Finland in Brazil in 1993. The following year, Valmet sold its tractor production and the Linnavuori engine plant to Sisu, which Partek acquired in 1997.

In the early 2000s, the company began collaborating with the German firm Bosch, which specialized in electronics for cars and work machines. As a result of the partnership, a control unit was developed for the engine. In 2002, Kone acquired Partek.

=== 2004–present ===
In 2004, Kone sold Valtra and its subsidiary Sisu Diesel to the U.S.-based AGCO Corporation, which had not previously owned its own engine factory.

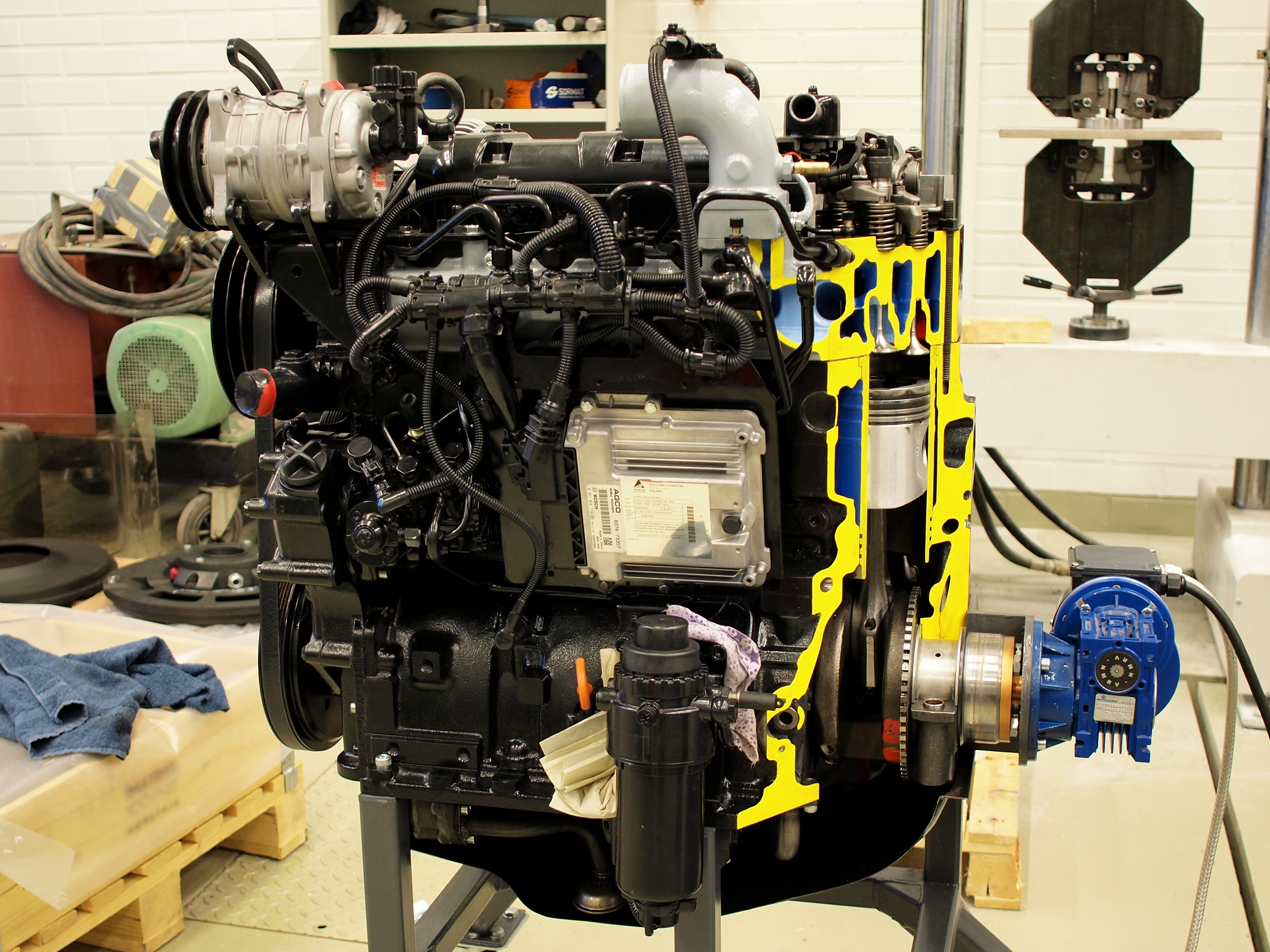
AGCO Sisu Power 49 AWI diesel engine from 2011

In 2009, AGCO Sisu Power manufactured approximately 30,000 diesel engines annually. This figure accounted for about half of the engines required by the group.

The production facility in Changzhou, China, was commissioned in 2012; two years later, a new factory was commissioned in Nokia, and an AGCO Power engine plant was opened in Argentina.

In the fall of 2025, the company's new production facilities in Linnavuori were commissioned. These facilities manufacture, for example, automatic transmission components and engine cylinder heads.

== Organization ==
AGCO Power is part of the AGCO Group. In Finland, in addition to AGCO Power, it owns Valtra Oy Ab.

AGCO Power manufactures engines not only in Linnavuori, Nokia, but also in Mogi das Cruzes in Brazil, Changzhou in China, and General Rodriguez in Argentina. Product development is concentrated at the main factory in Finland. The company's factories have a combined annual production capacity of over 100,000 engines.

In addition to production, the Linnanvuori plant houses a engine testing station.

== Products ==
In 2019, approximately 80 percent of AGCO Power's engines were used in the group's own machinery: Valtra, Massey Ferguson, Fendt, and Challenger tractors. The company also sells its engines for forestry forwarders and harvesters, combine harvesters, material handling machines, and power units.

The factory also manufactures primary and backup power units, gears, transmissions and transmission components. The gears, shafts, and transmissions it manufactures are used, for example, in BRP Finland's Lynx and Ski-Doo snowmobiles.
