= Complexe Moteurs Tracteurs =

Algerian manufacturer of agricultural machinery

CMT Spa
- Native name: مؤسسة الجرارات الفلاحية
- Type: Public
- Industry: Agricultural machinery
- Founded: 1997
- Defunct: 2009
- Fate: Discontinued
- Successor: Etrag
- Headquarters: Constantine, Algeria
- Products: Engines, tractors,
- Number of employees: 5000
- Parent: PMA

Complexe Moteurs Tracteurs, also known as CMT, was an Algerian manufacturer of agricultural machinery, tractors, and engines for several Algerian motor vehicle manufacturers such as Enmtp and SNVI. The CMT was an EPE / SPA in the portfolio of the SGP It was created in 1997 following the restructuring of the ENPMA. The complex was completed in 1972 by the German manufacturer DIAG according to the contractual form "product in hand" for the manufacture of agricultural tractors and diesel engines for different users. In 2009, CMT split into two companies Etrag which specializes in tractors and EMO which specializes in engines.

== Products ==
=== Tractors ===
Since 1974 more than 112 000 farm tractors were manufactured in CMT factories, when it was under the label Sonacome.

- Cirta C4006 From 1974 until 1983.
- Cirta C6006 From 1974 until 2003.
- Cirta CT900 From 1974 until 2003
- Cirta CX3.70 From 2003 until 2010
- Cirta CX 100 From 2001 until 2009
- Cirta C6807 From 1998 until 2009

=== Engines ===
Manufacturing diesel engines air cooled from 60 to 110 HP for agriculture and various mechanical Algerian companies.

- Cirta F4 L912

== See also ==
- Sonacome
- ENMTP
