= Etrag =

Algerian manufacturer of agricultural machinery

Etrag SPA
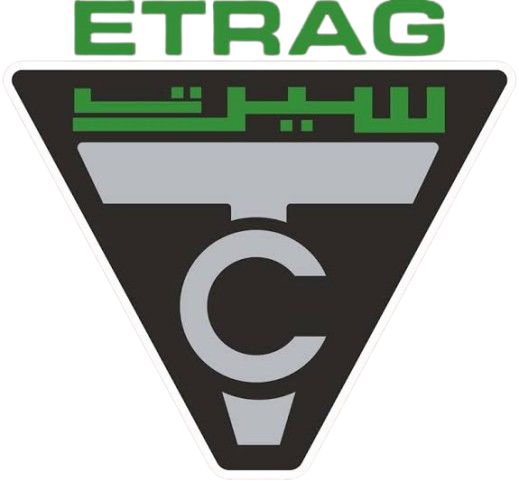
- Official logo of ETRAG.
- Native name: مؤسسة الجرارات الفلاحية
- Company type: Public
- Industry: Agriculture
- Founded: 29 June 2009
- Headquarters: Constantine, Algeria
- Key people: BENDJAMA Abdelaziz (CEO and chairman)
- Products: Agricultural machinery, consumer and commercial equipment, financial services, tractors.
- Operating income: ▲$45.8 million (2013)
- Number of employees: 1 216 (2016)
- Website: http://www.etrag.dz/

Etrag, short for Entreprise Publique Economique des Tracteurs Agricoles (EPE/ETRAG/Spa), is a company specialized in the development of agricultural machinery. It was created on June 29, 2009 following the split of the EPE CMT.

== Partnership ==
Etrag concluded an industrial and commercial partnership with AGCO Massey Ferguson, world leader in the manufacture of agricultural machinery. They created on 16 August 2012 a joint venture (joint venture) called Algerian Tractors Company ATC Spa. The agreement consisted of two local partners ETRAG with (36%), Pmat with (15%)and Massey Ferguson with (41%).

== Products ==
Since 1974 more than 112 000 farm tractors were manufactured in Etrag factories, when it was under the label Sonacome.

=== Obsolete Models ===
- Cirta C4006 From 1974 until 1983.
- Cirta C6006 From 1974 until 2003.
- Cirta CT900 From 1974 until 2003
- Cirta CX3.70 From 2003 until 2010
- Cirta CX 100 From 2001 until 2013 (first generation).

=== Actual Models ===
- Cirta C6807 Since 1998.
