= Mercedes-Benz Algeria =

Mercedes-Benz Algeria Ltd
- Company type: Subsidiary
- Industry: Automotive
- Founded: 2012
- Headquarters: Rouiba, Algeria
- Key people: Chouaki Rachid
- Products: Luxury Vehicles; Commercial Vehicles; Military vehicle
- Parent: Daimler AG, SNVI

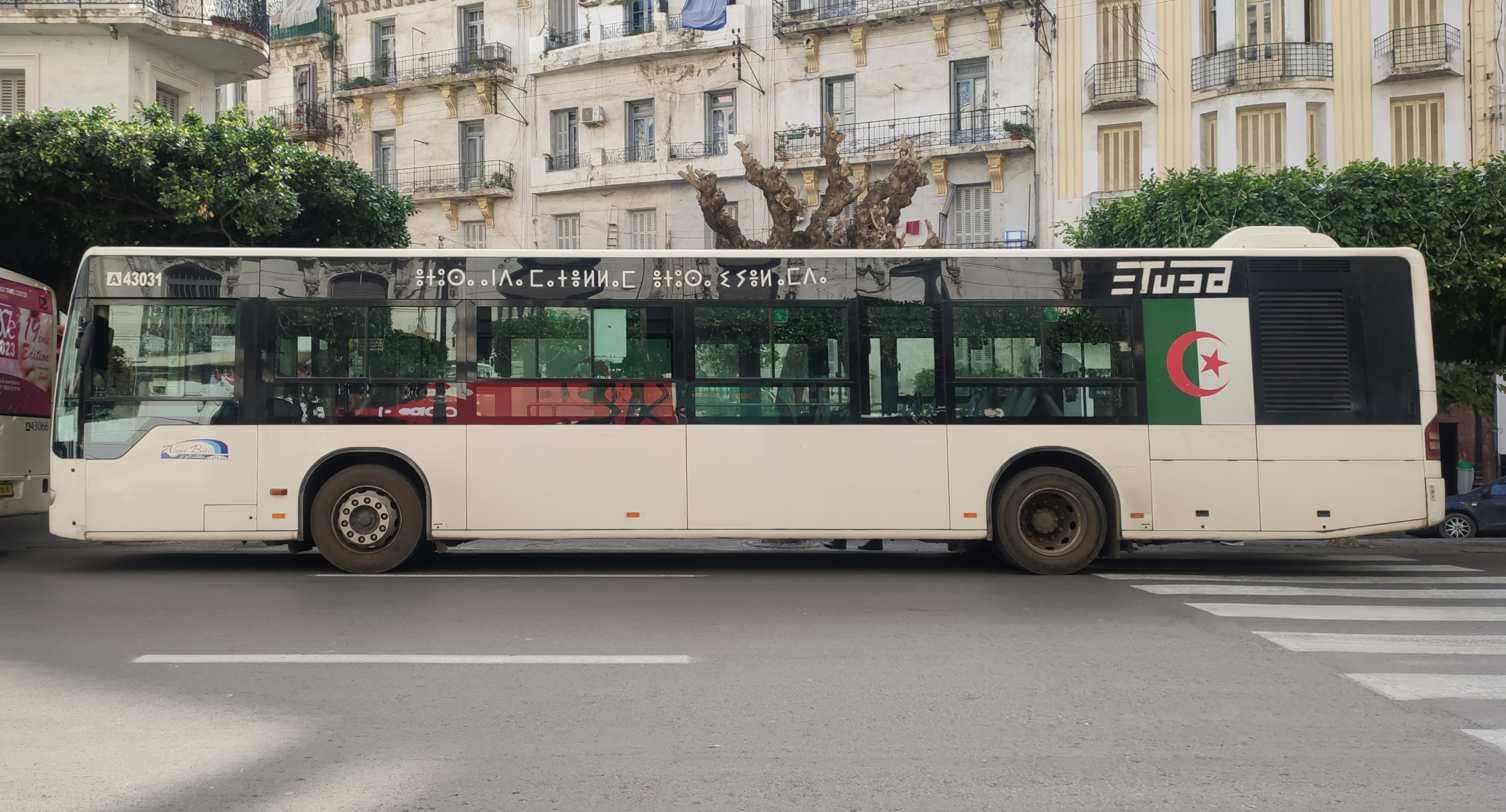
Transit bus assembled at Mercedes-Benz Algeria

Mercedes-Benz Algeria Ltd is a Joint ventures between the German Daimler AG, Algerian automotive industry (EDIV), SNVI and the Emirati investment fund AABAR founded in 2012, with headquarters in Tiaret, Rouiba, and Constantine, in Algeria.

== History ==
Daimler entered the Algerian market and established Mercedes-Benz Algeria Ltd in 2014.the venture created in July 2012 composed of three main shareholders, namely the Company of the development in the automotive industry (EDIV) coming under the National Defence Ministry (34%) and SNVI (17%). The second shareholder is represented by the Emirati investment fund "Aabar" (49%). German group Daimler AG is considered as the technological partner.

== Brand’s manufacturing facilities ==
The main factory of Mercedes in Algeria is in Rouiba, near Algiers, where heavy duty trucks and buses are manufactured. Models include:

- Zetros 1833 (4x4) - 4,000 to 6,000 kg payload
- Zetros 2733 (6x6) - 7,000 to 10,000 kg payload
- Actros
- Atego
- Axor
- Unimog

=== Other major facilities across Algeria ===
- (SAFAV-MB) Tiaret (Sprinter, Class G factory)
- Constantine EMO (Engines factory for all the models)

== Models ==
=== Assembled ===
- Mercedes-Benz G-Class 4x4 and 6x6
- Mercedes-Benz Sprinter
- Mercedes-Benz Zetros
- Mercedes-Benz Actros
