= DB120 =

DB120 may refer to:

- DB Class 120, a class of railway locomotive operated by Deutsche Bahn
- John Deere DB120, type of tractor manufactured by John Deere
