= Land imprinter =

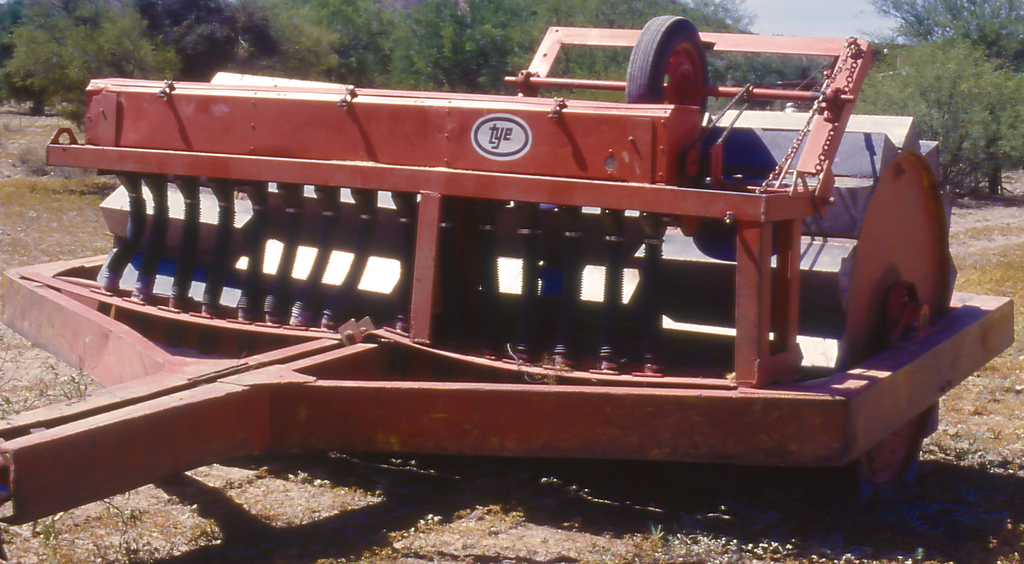
A land imprinter with seeder for planting grasses in rangeland and other desert environments.

The land imprinter is a no-till device for establishing grass cover in arid environments and deserts. The imprinter consists of a metal roller, with steel angles welded to the surface in various configurations. The angled teeth of the imprinter cut through weeds and brush to form a mulch, while the teeth press seeds of grasses and other plants into the soil. The imprints remain stable for approximately two years. During that time, imprints funnel water toward seedlings, protect them from wind, and concentrate nutrients for plant growth.

== Desertification ==
Plants create macropores that allow water to infiltrate (left), whereas desertification seals the surface, prohibiting infiltration and leading to rainwater runoff (right).

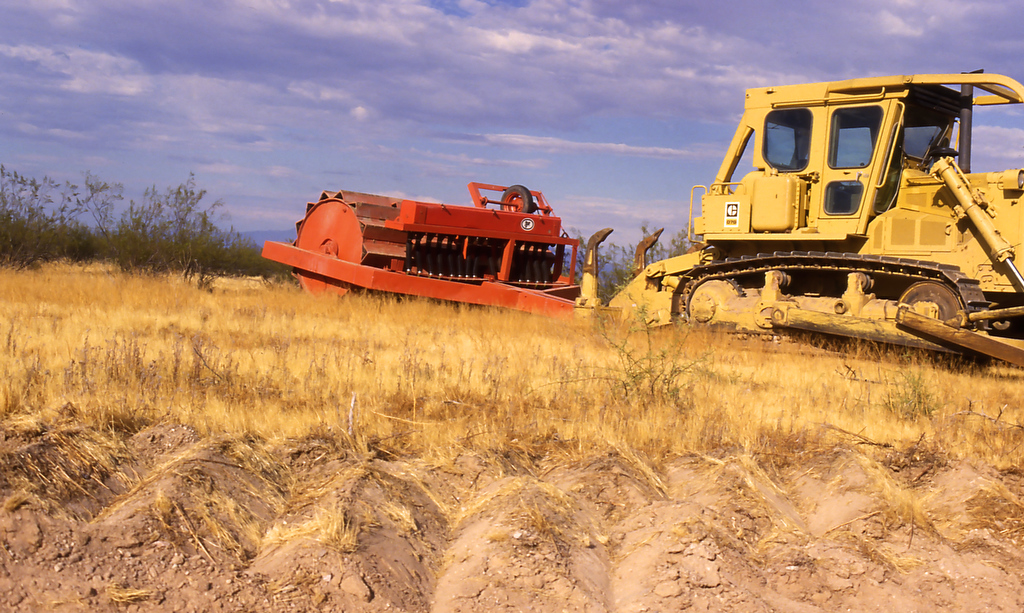
A land imprinter seeds grasses in the desert of the southwestern United States. The roller mulches existing ground cover and grass seed directly into the soil, without tilling.

Much of the world depends on grassland for the grazing of domestic livestock. Due to overgrazing, erosion, and other environmental factors, half of the world's rangeland is now lightly to moderately degraded, and 5% is severely degraded. Desertification is expanding and threatens one-third of the world's dry land. Plants and their root systems increase the quantity and size of macropores in soil, allowing rainwater to infiltrate. When ranges and grassland are overgrazed, soil becomes stripped of cover plants. Denuded soil has reduced macroporosity, reducing water infiltration and leading to runoff.

== Infiltration ==
The natural state of grassland is rough and open. Plants create small crests and troughs in the soil surface, making it rough. Root systems create macroports at the bottom of the troughs, into which water can infiltrate. At the same time, the small ridges allow air to escape.

Desertification causes the soil surface to be smooth and closed. Reduced soil macroporosity inhibits infiltration. Rainfall cannot infiltrate through macropores, and air becomes trapped. A sealed soil surface prevents rainwater infiltration, partly because air contained within soil macropores cannot escape, and water is unable to displace the air.

== Imprinting ==
Land imprinter teeth are pressed into soil for infiltration imprint.

Desertified soil has a sealed surface where rainwater cannot infiltrate, and air contained within soil macropores cannot escape (left). A soil imprint created by a land imprinter funnels water toward seedlings and provides a chimney for air to escape (right).

Imprinting reverses the desertification process by pressing V-shape imprints into the soil with steel angles on a heavy roller. Rainwater then funnels into the troughs of the imprints, where the water infiltrates into the indentation and air exhausts from the crests. Seedlings are protected from wind, and organic material is concentrated at the base of the troughs to provide nutrients to the seedling. Wind protection attenuates evaporation at the base of the seedling, maximizing water availability to the plant during the rainy season. The seedbed may remain dry for some time before water infiltrates and germination occurs. In the meantime, the stable imprint protects the seed from wind erosion and desiccation from exposure to the sun.

Broadcast seeders can be attached to the frame assembly or grain boxes mounted in front of the imprinting roller, so that seed is dropped in front of the roller which presses the seed into the soil. The weight of the imprinter can be adjusted to be appropriate for various soils and planting conditions by filling the roller and ballast tanks with water.

== Uses and limitations ==
The land imprinter was initially developed to revegetate desertified land in the southwestern United States and has been used to plant 20,000 hectares of land with grasses and other plant species in Arizona. Imprinting is most effective on loam soils that have some moisture but are not wet, which can cause soil to become compacted into the imprinter teeth. Imprinting has been conducted on slopes of up to 45% grade. For those applications cables can be used to tow the imprinter up the incline. The land imprinter is not well adapted for shallow soil or extremely rocky soil and is not well suited to mulching large stands of brush. Large shrubs must be chopped or removed prior to imprinting.

The land imprinter is typically used directly on unprepared soils, without initial tilling. The heavy roller and angled teeth crush weeds and brush into mulch, which remain as a nutrient base for new seedlings. Accordingly, it can be used on land that has been burned either intentionally or in wildfires, where remnant vegetation should be retained.

Imprinting is best suited for seeding on loose soils, and where there is either no existing plant cover—or light to moderate brush cover—before planting. Haferkamp and colleagues compared seed drill planting to imprinting on loose and firm seedbeds on a Wyoming big sagebrush and needlegrass habitat. Drilling produced more seedlings on firm seedbeds, whereas imprinting produced two times more seedlings on loose soils, compared to drilling. Haferkamp and colleagues used brushbeating plus disking to create the loosened soil treatment in that study. Ripping or chisel plowing can be used as alternatives to disking when soil is deeply compacted, as they are less destructive to soil components than disking.

The land imprinter creates microdepressions in the soil that effectively reduce erosion and runoff. Imprinting has been found to be superior to drilling at research sites in Utah, and superior to chaining after aerial broadcasting on burned seedbeds in Oregon.
