= Europactor Algeria =

Europactor Algeria Spa.
- Company type: Public
- Industry: Heavy equipment
- Founded: 2008
- Headquarters: Constantine, Algeria
- Key people: Riad Zoghmar (CEO and chairman)
- Products: Construction & Machinery
- Website: http://www.enmtp.com/europactor-algerie-3/

Europactor Algeria Spa. is an Algeria-based manufacturer of compaction heavy equipment. It is a partnership between the Spanish firm Europactor S.L. and the Algerian Sofare Spa., a subsidiary of the ENMTP Group.

== History ==
In January 2008 ENMTP began negotiations with the Zaragoza-based Europactor S.L. to create a new company based in Aïn Smara, Constantine Algeria. In April of that year an agreement was signed, with Sofare owning 60% and Europactor S.L. 40% of the shares of the new company. In 2013 the factory was ready and started manufacturing several models of road rollers.

== Models ==
The Aïn Smara facility manufactures several models of road rollers, including five types of single-drum compactors, ranging from 3 to 20 tons, and one 12-ton double-drum compactor. All the models are equipped with water-cooled engines, which are manufactured by the Oued Hamimine company of Constantine.
