= Mercedes-Benz Zetros =

Off-road truck

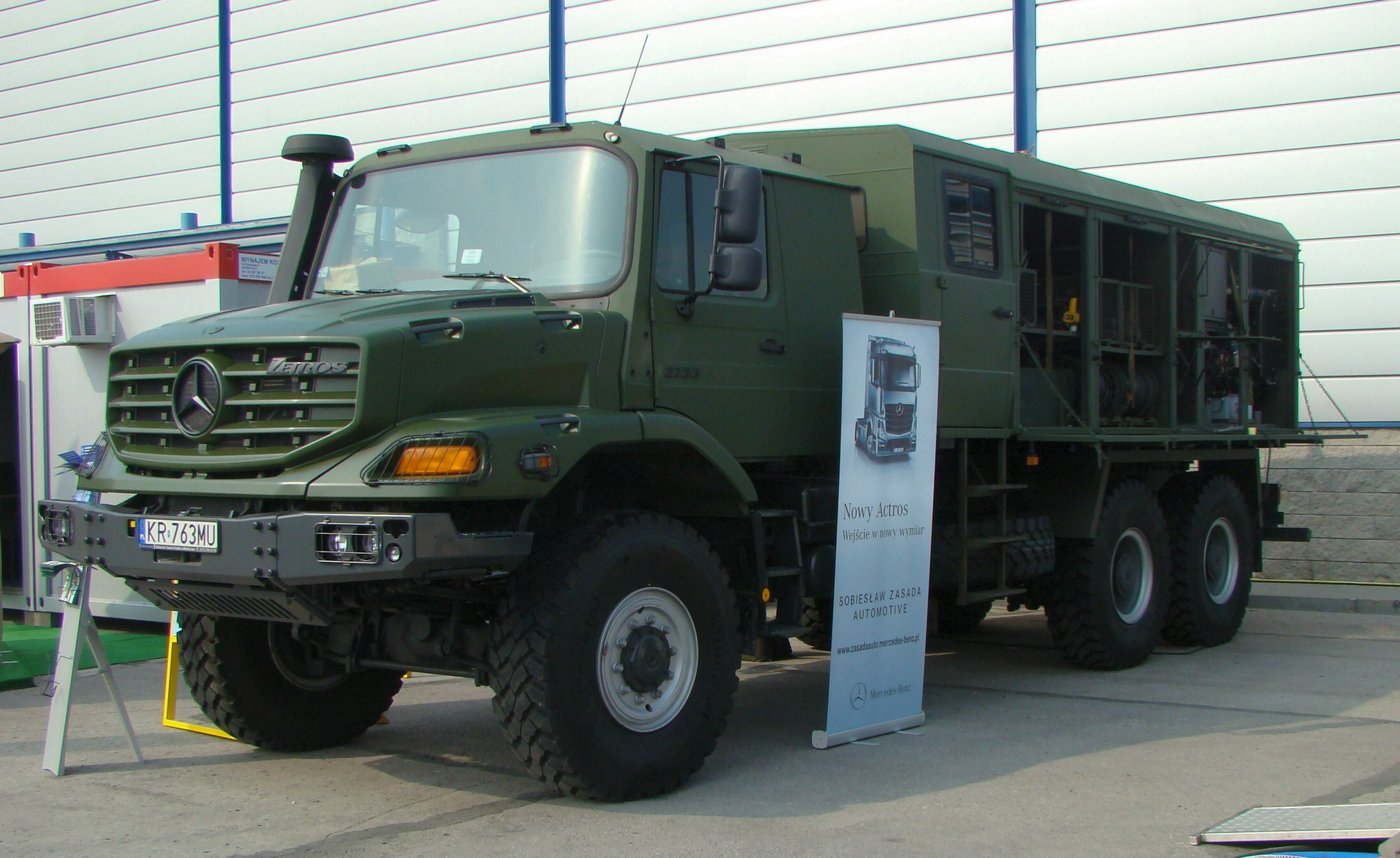
- Zetros 2733 at the International Defence Industry Exhibition 2012
- Type: Tactical transport truck
- Place of origin: Germany

Service history
- Used by: See Operators

Production history
- Manufacturer: Daimler AG (2008-2019); Daimler Truck (2019-present)
- Produced: 2008 - present
- No. built: > 15,000 as of October 2025
- Variants: See Variants

The Mercedes-Benz Zetros is an off-road truck for extreme operations, developed by German manufacturer Mercedes-Benz and currently produced by Daimler Truck. It is designed to be compatible with the C-130 Hercules transport and also fits into a standard German railway carriage.

The Zetros was first presented at the 2008 Eurosatory military trade show in Paris. It was initially only produced at the Mercedes-Benz plant in Wörth, Germany. The Canadian Army ordered the Zetros, the chassis is made in Wörth, but armoured cabins and the custom modules will be added to the chassis by Marshall Canada, Manac, Soframe, and General Dynamics Land Systems-Canada in Canada. Daimler is proposing a collaboration to produce it in France with Arquus for the French Army.

In 2019, Mercedes-Benz presented a facelift of the Zetros; it features a more powerful engine and a bigger number of variants.

== Variants ==
The Zetros is available with an engine power of 360 hp (265 kW) up to 510 hp (375 kW) in all-wheel drive and non all-wheel drive versions:

- Chassis, tipper or tractor
- 4×4, 6×6, 8×8

Although normally used as a truck, the Zetros has also been put to work as an off-road tractor unit in the middle east. German company Harald Bruhn also introduced a Zetros-based agricultural trailer truck as the Secutor.

8X8 Version: Frappe Longue Portée Terrestre FLP-T 150 Multiple rocket launcher version for the French Army.

Unmanned Ground Vehicle version uses the MOSAIC Ground Autonomy Kit from Quantum Systems allowing Artificial Intelligence to autonomously carry out activities related to military logistics.

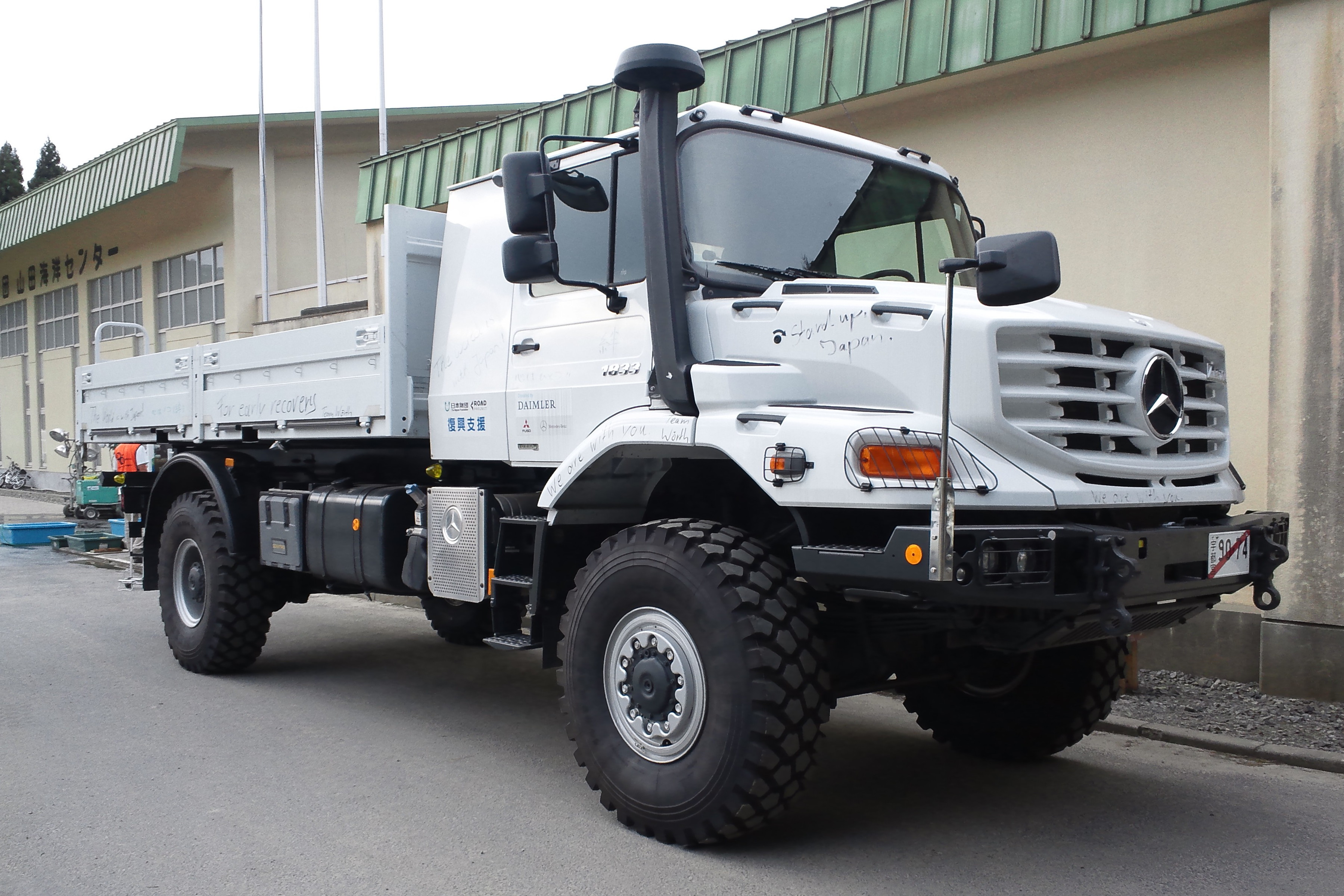
Mercedes-Benz Zetros 1833 as a relief vehicle for the 2011 Tōhoku earthquake and tsunami

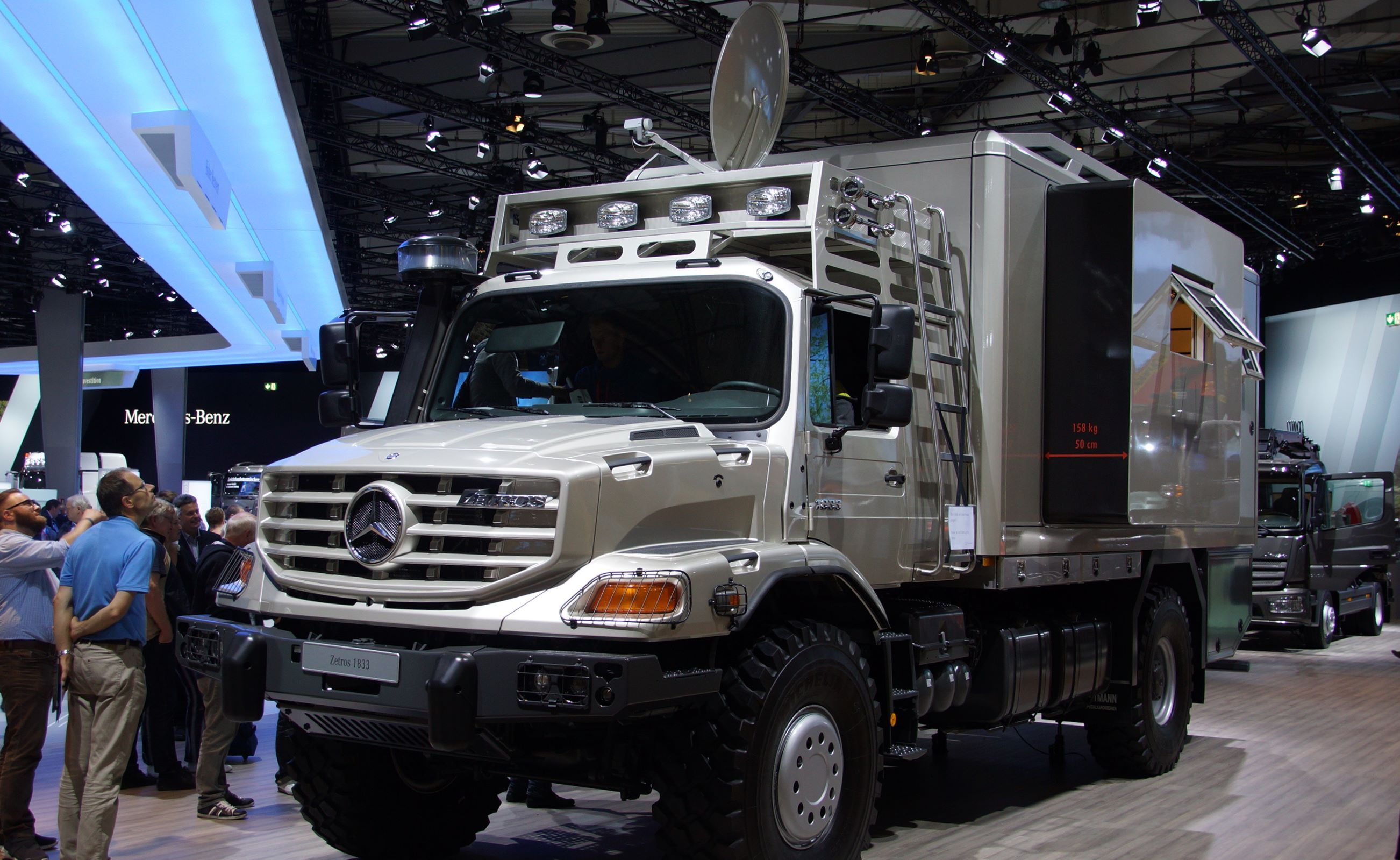
Zetros 1833 RV at IAA 2014

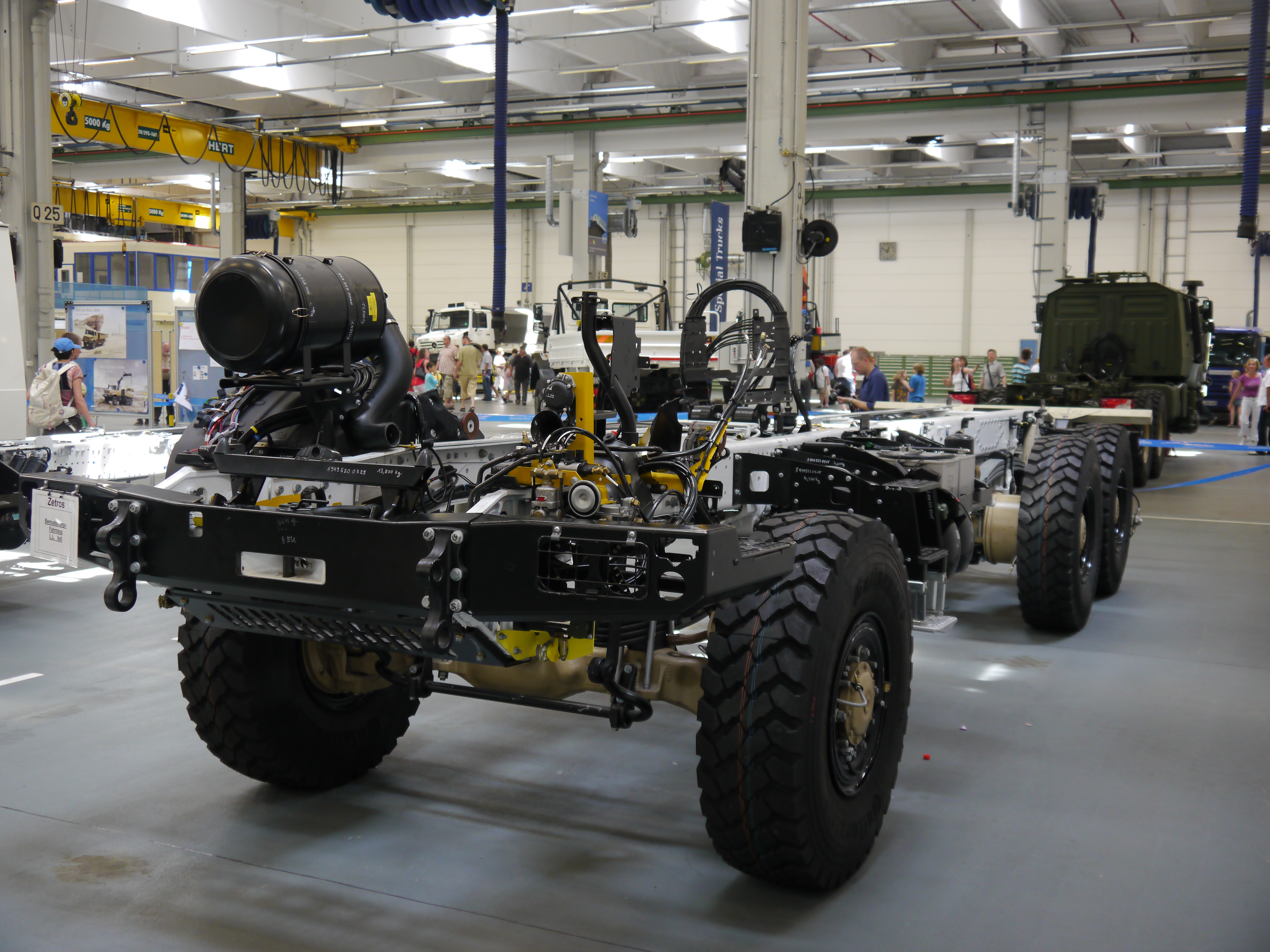
Rolling chassis of a Zetros 2733

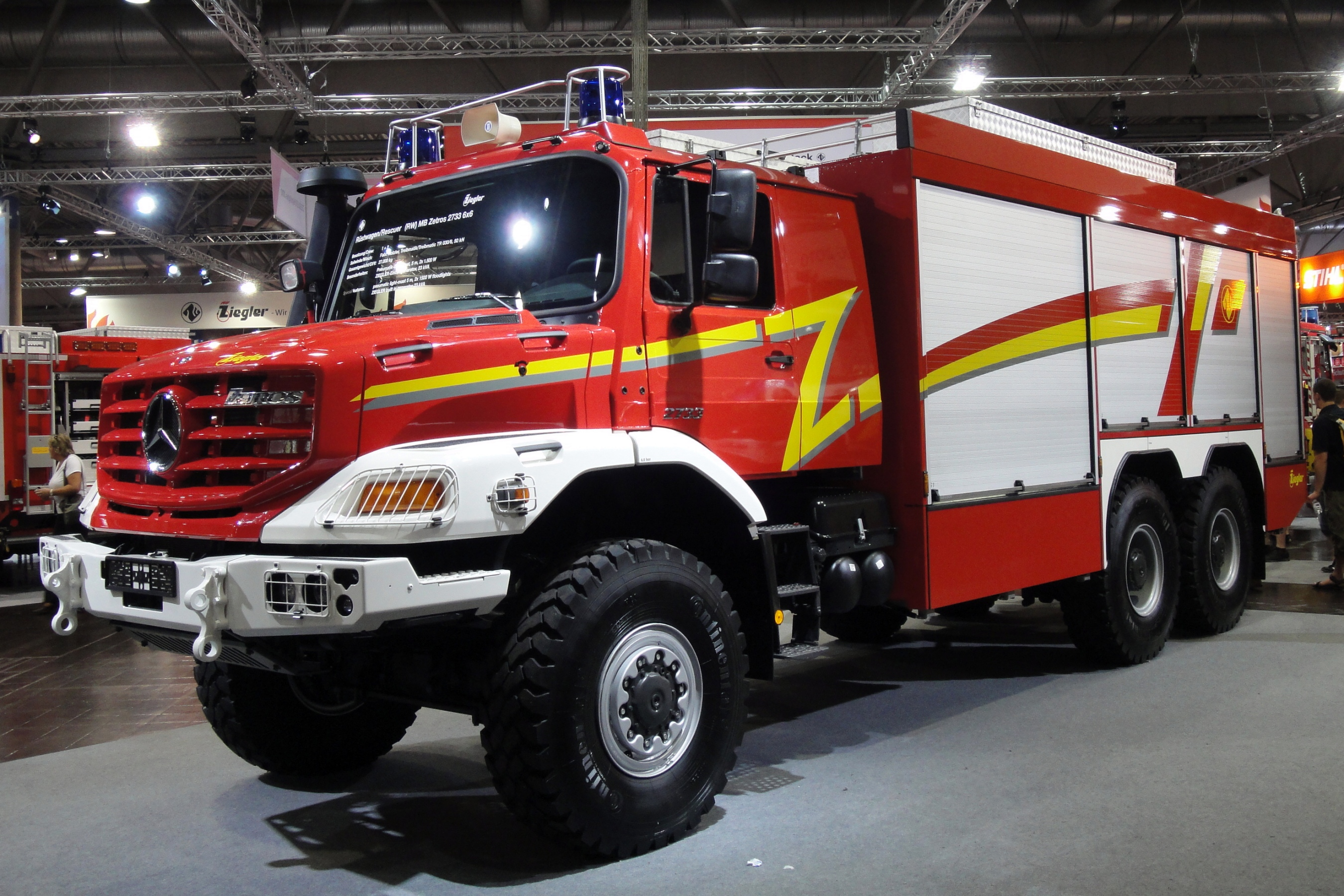
Mercedes-Benz Zetros 2733 6x6 technical rescue truck

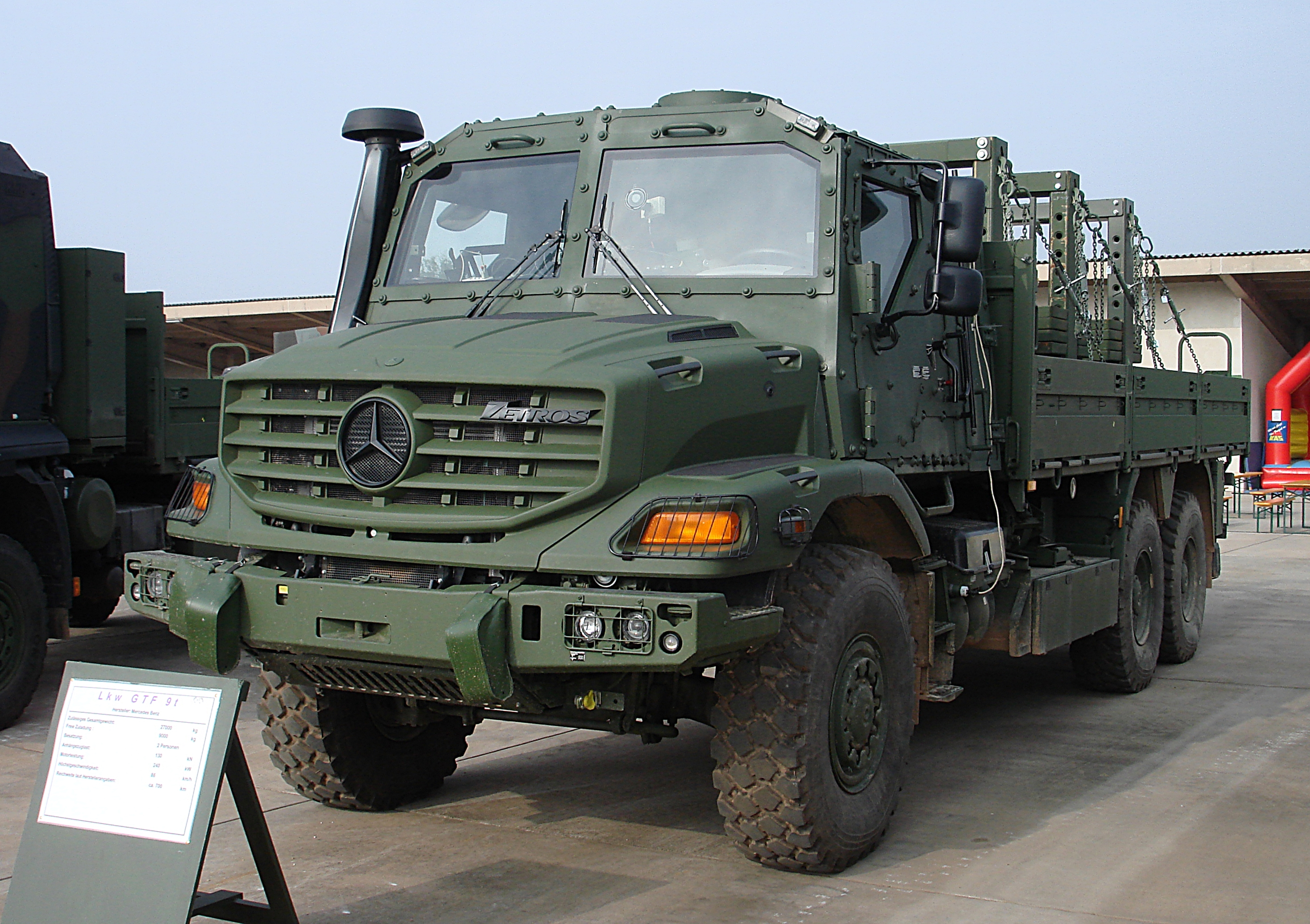
Zetros 2733 of the German Army

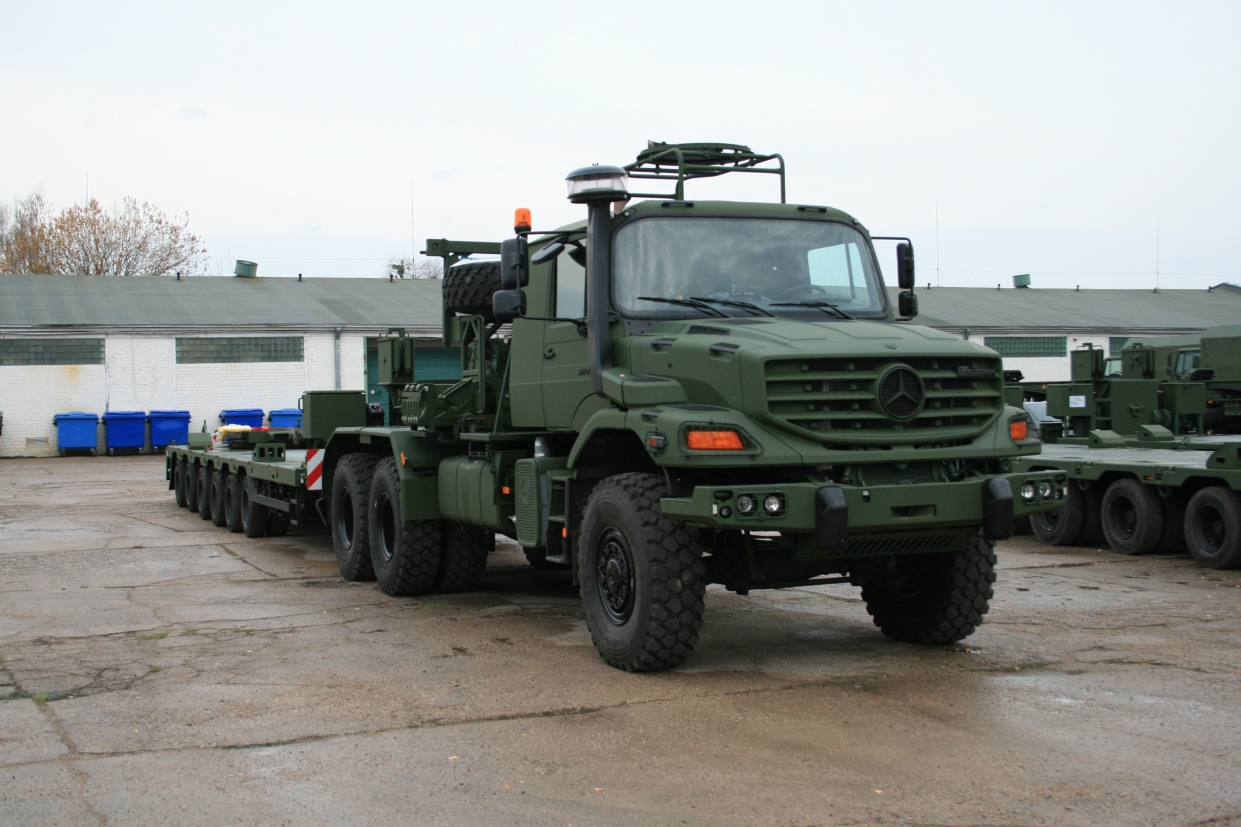
Mercedes-Benz ZETROS with Mercedes-Benz EMPL platform of Lithuanian army

=== Technical characteristics ===
The facelifted Zetros has now one type of engine in all variants.

- Engine: 12.816 cc inline 6 cylinder diesel

Emission	Power [kW]	Power [hp]	Torque [Nm]
EU III	265	360	1.800
EU III	310	421	2.100
EU III	350	476	2.300
EU V	330	449	2.200
EU V	375	510	2.400

- Transmission: 16 speed manual transmission with shift lever, controlled via control cable, pneumatic power-assisted
- mechanical differential locks on front and rear axles and in the transfer case
- Top speed: 55 mph
- fording depths up to 0.8m

== Operators ==
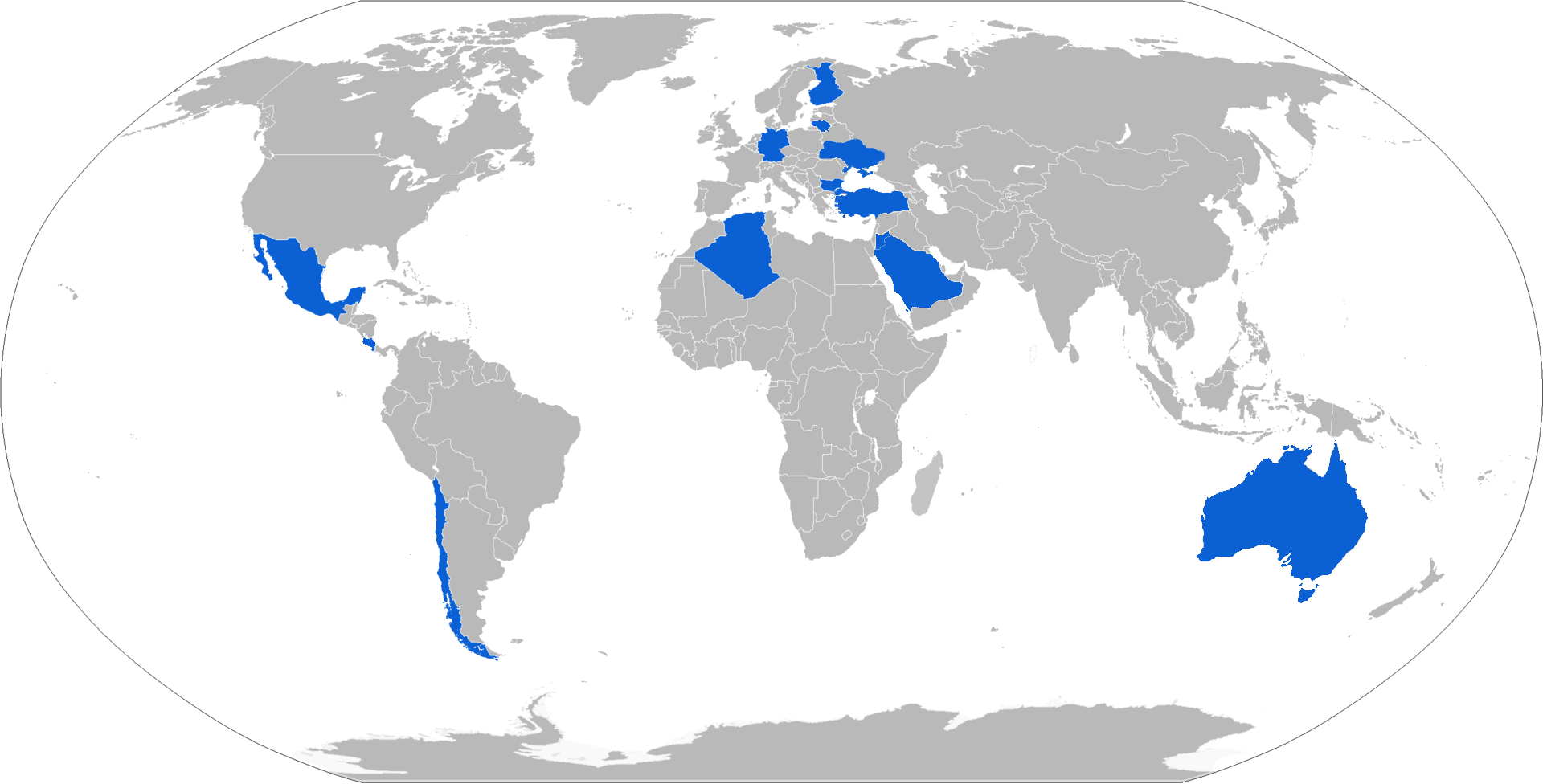
Map with Zetros operators in blue

=== Military operators ===
==== Current operators ====
Algeria
Around 2,000 trucks are planned to be produced by the Algeria's National Company of Industrial Vehicles (SNVI) destined for the Algerian defence ministry. Locally further developed into self-propelled artillery systems using the D-30 and T-12 gun systems.
Bulgaria
The Bulgarian army ordered the Zetros in 2009 to transport personnel and supplies. As of 2012, it operates 335 trucks with 30 more on order.
Chile
In August 2016 Mercedes Benz has been awarded a contract to provide 330 trucks for the Chilean Army. The contract includes a batch of Zetros 2733 6×6 and Unimog U4000 4×4 vehicles.
In May 2025, 33 Zetros 2036A were ordered by the Chilean Army, am artillery tow-truck.
Finland
The Finnish Defence Forces have acquired Zetros trucks to replace outdated Sisu Auto vehicles for transportation of both personnel and explosives.
France
The French Air Force ordered several MICA VL fire units. The launchers of the fire units are using the Zetros as platform.
A large order was made in January 2026 for up to 7,000 trucks. John Cockerill will supply and militarise the trucks.
Germany
The German army has ordered a total of 110 armoured Zetros vehicles, 72 of which are supposed to serve in logistics units.
Jordan
Germany donated 20 Zetros 2733 A 6×6 trucks and 50 Zetros 1833 A 4×4 trucks to Jordan in order to be used for the logistics of the Jordanian security agencies when caring for refugees.
Lithuania
Eight Zetros 3643 6×6 tow trucks acquired in 2019 with Mercedes-Benz EMPL platform for PzH 2000 or Bergepanzer 2 transportation.
141 Zetros 2733 6×6 transport trucks equipped with cranes acquired in 2023; they will delivered by 2030.
Mexico
The Mexican Army and Mexican Air Force have planned the purchase of 137 6×6 trucks, in three stages, beginning the first purchase of 46 in 2017. The Mexican Navy also operates an undisclosed number of Zetros trucks.
Poland
31 Mercedes Benz Zetros 3348 AS 6×6 with Dobrowolski DOB70W low bed semi-trailer with an option for 78 more sets ordered in October 2021 for tank transport duty. First 8 sets delivered by the end of 2023.
Saudi Arabia
Operated by the Saudi Arabian National Guard.
Turkey
The Turkish Armed Forces use Zetros as HISAR carrier.
Ukraine
As of January 2025, the Armed Forces of Ukraine have received:
- 262 logistics trucks
- 78 tankers based on the Zetros
On order:
- 20 refrigerator Zetros.
- > 1,000 ordered by Germany for Ukraine (October 2025)
- 200 Bohdana howitzers based on the Zetros truck financed in December 2025 (€750 million)

==== Future operators ====
Canada (1,500)
The Canadian army selected General Dynamics Land Systems Canada in a joint venture with Marshall Canada as bid winner for the LVM (Logistics Vehicle Modernisation) programme. The contract signed in June 2024 provides for:
- 1,000 light trucks (Zetros 4×4)
- 500 heavy trucks (Zetros 8×8)

==== Evaluation only ====
Argentina
In 2016, Mercedes-Benz presents and exhibit the Zetros in the Directorate of Arsenals, the plant of the former TAMSE in Boulogne. As reported by the Defensa site, the Argentine Army is a former customer of Mercedes-Benz. The idea is that the Zetros can replace, in a gradual way, the current fleet of Unimog and MB 1114.

=== Civilian clients ===
==== Current operators ====
Australia
Agriculture vehicles:
- The Zetros is used as a fertiliser spreader and manure spreader in the South East of South Australia. It is a 4×4 version operated by Crossling Contractors based in Naracoorte.
Costa Rica
Emergency vehicles:
- The first non military application of the Zetros 2733 was announced in June 2018 by the Costa Rican Firefighters as the organization acquired one. It will serve as transport for rescue crew and equipment in emergency situations as floods, hurricanes, storms, wild fires, volcanic eruptions and earthquakes.
Finland
Mining industry:
- Zetros 6×6 tank truck used on on open-cast mine at Kevista.
France
Vehicle body maker:
- KLUBB Group uses it as a base vehicle for specialised vehicles.
Germany
Mining industry:
- Zetros 4×4 tow truck used in an anhydrite mine by Knauf Gips KG in Hüttenheim.
