= Gorru =

Agricultural tool

Gorru is a seeder in India. It is used for applying fertilizers and sowing sorghum, groundnut, Bengal gram, green gram, black gram, and cowpea. It is animal-driven. It is also used for weed control.
