= Algerian Tractors Company =

Algerian manufacturer of agricultural machinery

Algerian Tractors Company ATC Spa
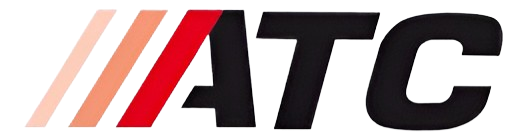
- Logo of the Algerian Tractor Company.
- Native name: شركة الجرارات الجزائرية
- Company type: Joint venture company between Etrag and AGCO
- Industry: Agricultural machinery
- Founded: 16 August 2012
- Headquarters: Constantine, Algeria
- Key people: Mezdour Abdelhafid (Chairman).
- Products: Tractors
- Operating income: ▲DZD 1 146 million (2013)
- Website: http://www.etrag.dz/?p=105

Algerian Tractors Company ATC Spa is an Algerian agricultural machinery manufacturer. It is a joint venture created on August 16, 2012, after an agreement between the Algerian company Etrag and the American Group AGCO. The factory produce tractors in El Khroub, close to Constantine, Algeria.

== Partnership ==
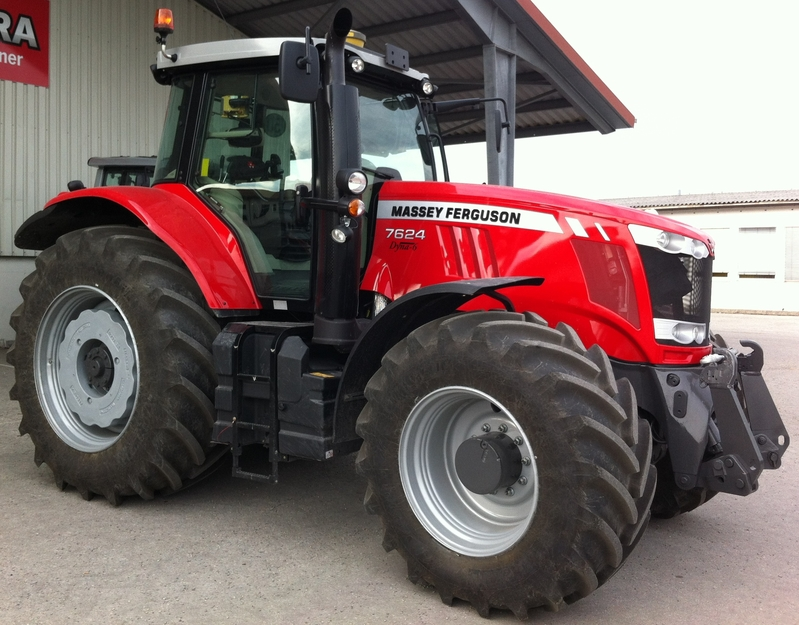
Massey Ferguson

Etrag concluded an industrial and commercial partnership with AGCO. They created on 16 August 2012 a joint venture (joint venture) called Algerian Tractors Company ATC Spa. The agreement consisted of two local partners: ETRAG with (36%), Pmat with (15%) and AGCO with (41%).

== Products ==
The factory is producing one Etrag tractor and several Massey Ferguson tractors.

=== Etrag Models ===
- Cirta C6807 2x4 (68 CV)

=== Massey Ferguson Models ===
- MF 425 2x4 and 4x4 (55 CV)
- MF 440 Xtra 4x4 (82 CV)
- MF 7150 4x4 (150 CV)

== See also ==
- List of companies of Algeria
