= Somatel Liebherr =

Somatel-Liebherr Spa
- Company type: Public
- Industry: Heavy equipment
- Founded: 1 July 2012
- Headquarters: Constantine, Algeria
- Key people: Abheiden Rainer (CEO and chairman), Brik Boubaker (Chief executive)
- Products: Construction & Machinery
- Total assets: DZD 1,650 billion (end 2012)
- Website: http://www.enmtp.com/somatel-liebherr-2/

Somatel-Liebherr Spa: is a publicly-owned manufacturer of heavy equipment based in Constantine, Algeria. It is a joint venture between the German Liebherr Group and Somatel, a subsidiary of the Algerian government-owned ENMTP. It was founded in 2012 and is located in the industrial area of Ain Smara in Constantine Somatel-Liebherr started production in 2013.

Somatel controls 51% of the company's shares, and Liebherr Group 49%.

== Products ==
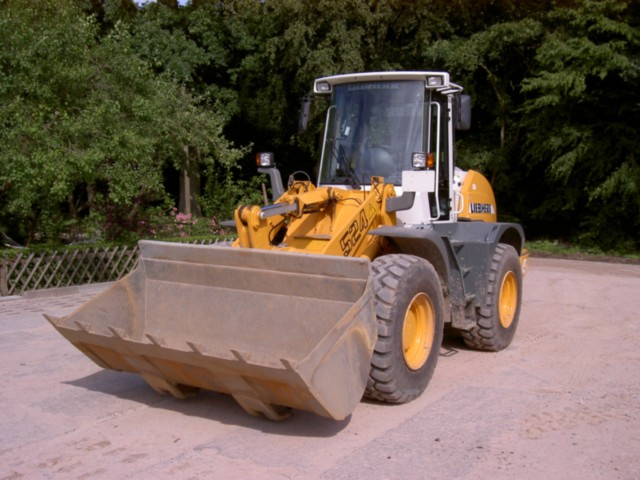
Wheel loader L524

The current line of products manufactured by the company includes:

=== Hydraulic Excavators ===
- A 904
- R 926 C
- R 954 C

=== Wheel loaders ===
- L 524
- L 566

=== Bulldozers ===
- PR 744
- PR 754
