= ENMTP =

Algerian company

ENMTP SPA
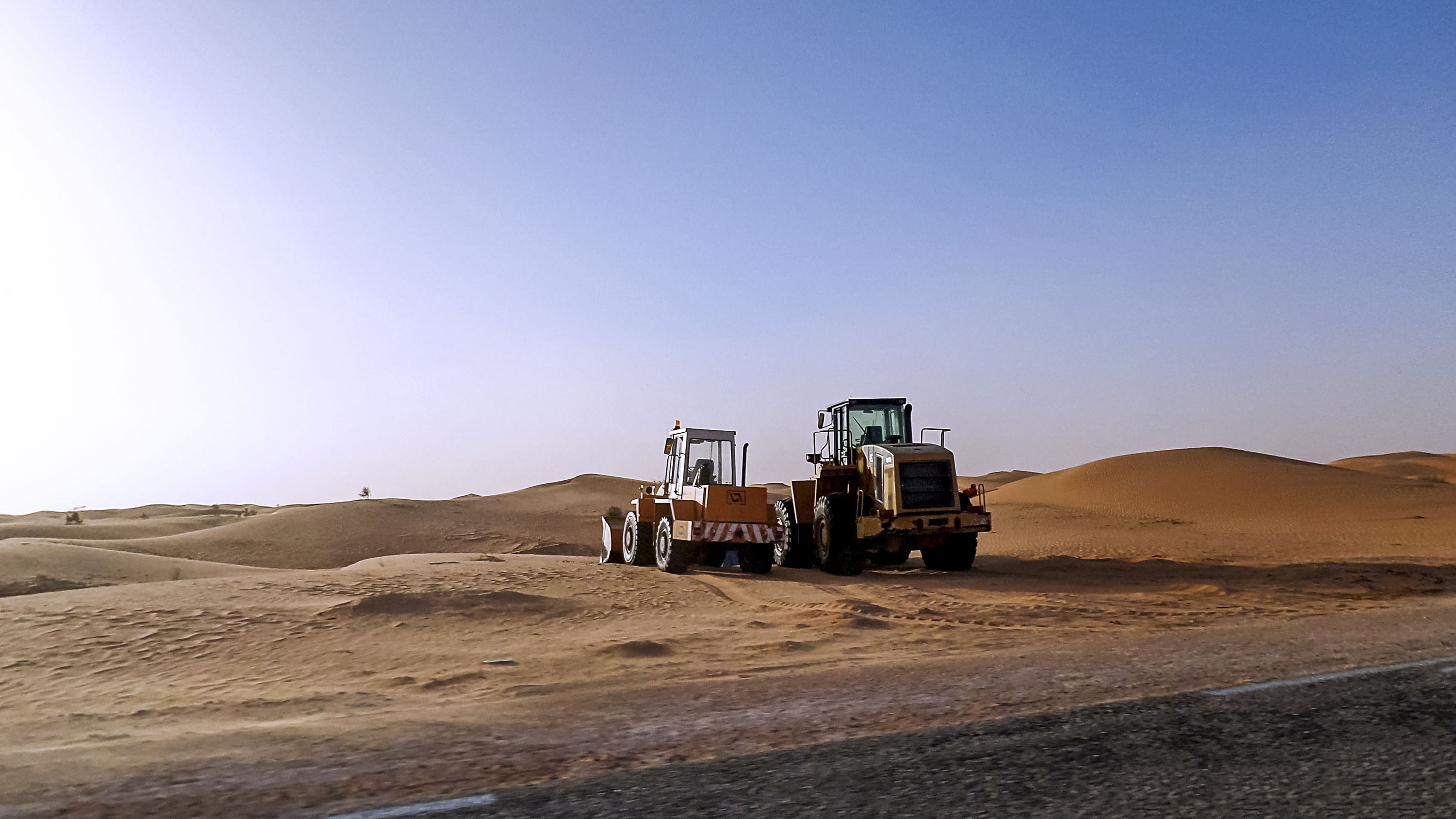
- Native name: المؤسسة الوطنية لعتاد الأشغال العمومية
- Type: Public
- Industry: Heavy equipment
- Founded: January 1983
- Headquarters: Constantine, Algeria
- Key people: Slimane BOULEBD (CEO and chairman)
- Products: Construction & Machinery
- Operating income: ▲£70.7 million (2012)
- Number of employees: 2 300 (2012)
- Website: http://www.enmtp.com/

ENMTP (from Entreprise Nationale des Materiels de Travaux Publics) is an Algerian company specializing in the development, manufacture and distribution of machinery used in public works. It has registered capital of 15.6 billion DA and is 100% owned by the state.

Following the restructuring of the Sonacome and SN METAL, the National Company of heavy equipment "ENMTP" was transformed into joint stock company in 1995.

The ENMTP Group produced materials under licenses acquired from recognized manufacturers, such as:

Liebherr (Germany) for excavators, cranes, bulldozers and large shippers O & K (Germany) for loaders INGERSOLL RAND CO (United States) in the field of compressors and compactors POTAIN (United States) for the production of building cranes Braud & Faucheux for manufacturing concrete mixers and materials developed with the company's internal skills: backhoe loaders, Graders, BTS Press and various small products

The industrial potential of ENMTP Group is considered one of the largest in Africa. It is structured according to specialization by product lines. Each unit have the largest industrial autonomy.

== Infrastructures ==
Four Manufacturing plants and a commercial network covering Algeria ENMTP manages a sizeable industrial potential involving 2,400 workers who generated a turnover of US$60 million in 2006, and expects US$70 million by the year 2007 with a 2,350-strong workforce.

This potential is mainly organized in the main engineering industries and related products: public works equipments (excavators, hydraulic cranes, loaders, bulldozers, etc.), compactors and compressors, and concrete equipment.

The ENMTP restructuring strategy grants a leading part to partnership with national or international operators, irrespective of their legal status. Whatever the option, what matters most is that it achieves the desired targets: developing competitive products, expanding distribution channels, notably abroad, and securing technological "know how".

== Partnership ==
Promoting partnership through the setting up of subsidiaries in order to upgrade products and manufacturing process, develop competitive products, rehabilitate and update the tool of production, and promote access to foreign markets.

This partnership policy lead to the creation of two new Companies:

- in 2012 Somatel Liebherr was created with the German group Liebherr.
- Europactor Algeria, as a subsidiary of Sofare

== Products ==
The current line of products manufactured by the company includes: backhoe loaders, compaction equipment, stationary compressors (Electric/Diesel), concrete pumps, and other small and medium constructions machines.

== Products ==
The current line of products manufactured by the company includes: hydraulic excavators, wheel loaders, bulldozers, backhoe loaders, graders, propelled cranes, tower crane, compaction equipment, stationary compressors (electric/diesel), concrete mixers, dumpers, concrete pumps, spreaders, and other small & medium constructions machines.

== See also ==
- Sonacome
- Cirta
- Sofare SPA
