= John Deere DB120 =

Tractor model

The John Deere DB120 is an agricultural planter made by Bauer Built Mfg. in Paton, Iowa. Upon its release in 2009, it was the largest production planter in the world. It has a 120 feet (37 m) wide tool-bar and plants 48 rows which are 30 inches (760 mm) apart. It is estimated that the planter should sow 70 to 80 acres (0.32 km^{2}) per hour at 5 to 5.5 miles per hour ground speed. This means that in a 12-hour day it will plant almost two sections of land. John Deere claims that the planter is 30% more productive than their 36 row DB90 planter. To transport such an incredibly wide implement, the DB120 folds into five sections . The planter weighs in at over 20 tons empty and almost 24 tons when loaded with seed. The DB120 had a limited release in 2009 with orders being taken for the 2010 season. It retailed at $345,000. In 2020, the base price on the John Deere website was over $500,000.

The DB120 needs a GPS (satellite navigation) system to guide it as there are no row markers to indicate where to position the tractor/planter.
