= Broadcast spreader =

Seed and fertilizer spreading tool

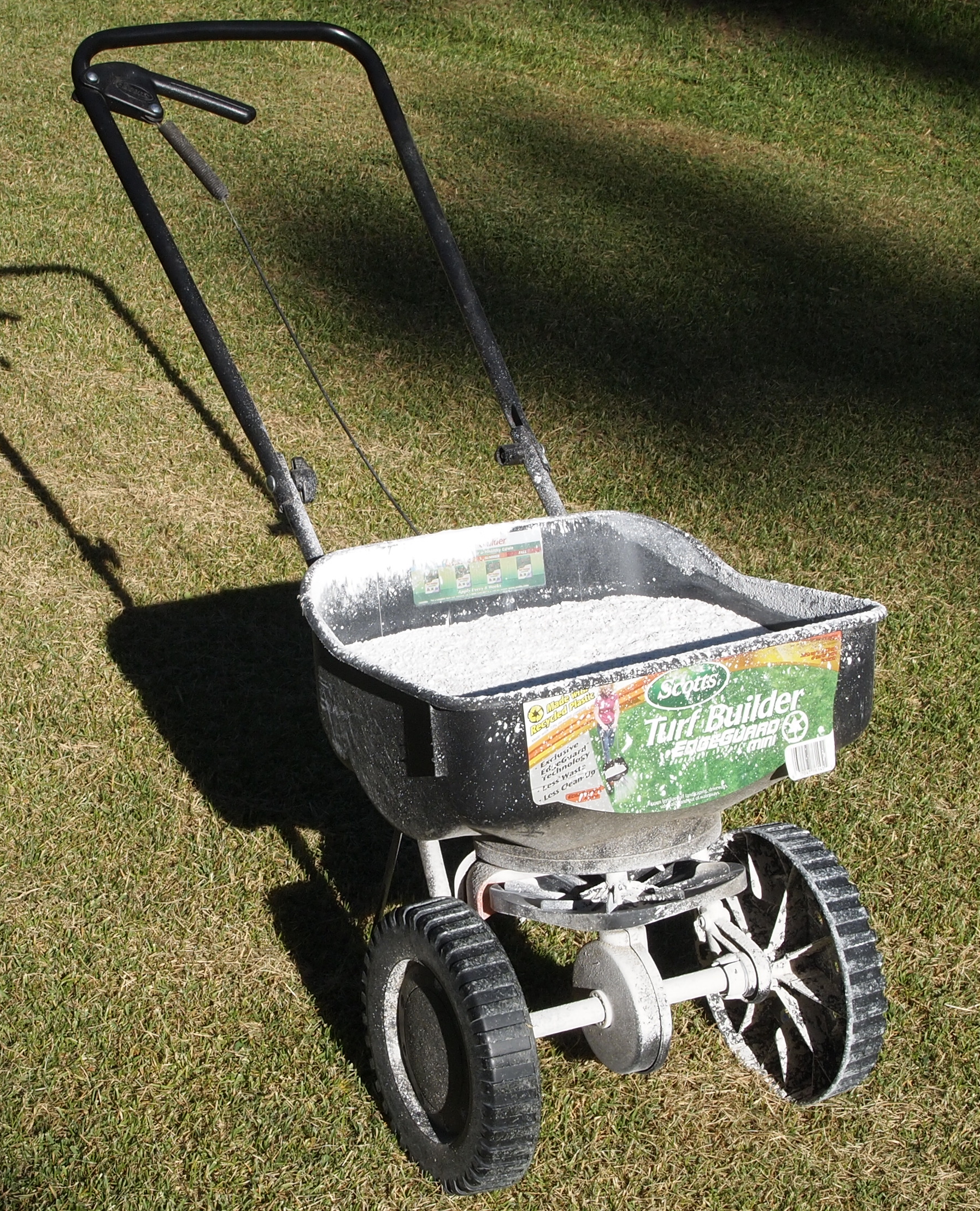
Hand-pushed broadcast spreader

A broadcast seeder, alternately called a broadcaster, broadcast spreader, fertilizer spreader or centrifugal fertilizer spreader (Europe) or "spinner" (UK), is a farm implement commonly used for spreading seed and fertilizer where no row planting is required (mostly for lawns and meadows: grass seeds or wildflower mixes), lime, fertilizer, sand, ice melt, etc., and is an alternative to drop spreaders/seeders. Apart from spinners there is also a type of broadcast spreader called "wagtail spreader" (the name describing the movement of its distributing part), used with tractors.

== Types ==
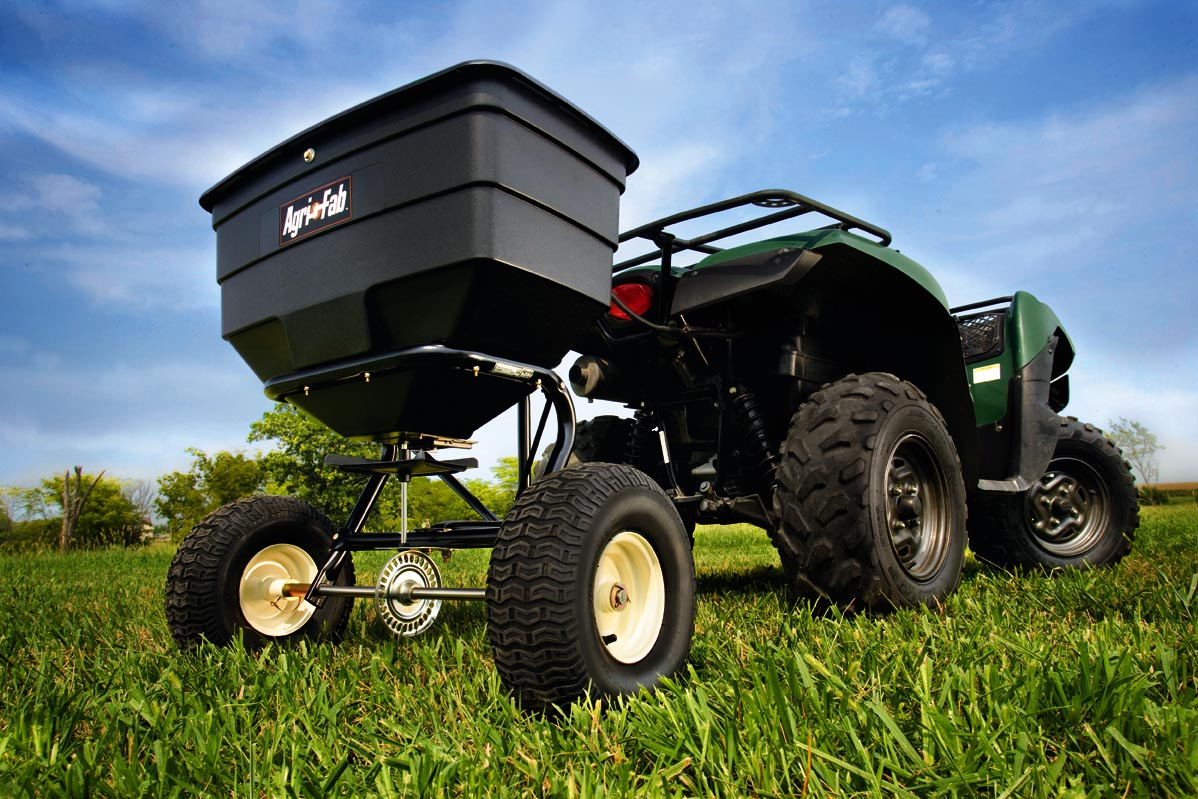
ATV tow spreaders normally have a larger capacity to enable the coverage of larger areas.

The smallest are handheld with a hopper of several liters and which operate via hand cranking. A bit larger are push units with the spinning disk powered by gearing to the wheels. The next size up is designed to be towed behind a garden tractor or ATV. Very similar in size to the tow behind units are broadcast seeders that mount to the three-point hitch of a compact utility tractor, these are ideal for landscape and small property maintenance. Still larger are commercial broadcast seeders/spreaders designed and sized appropriately for agricultural tractors and mount to the tractor's three point hitch. The broadcast seeders that are mounted to a three-point hitch are powered by a power take-off (P.T.O.) shaft from the tractor. At the largest size are pull behind or chassis mounted units for agricultural use that can spread widths of up to 90 feet.

== How they work ==
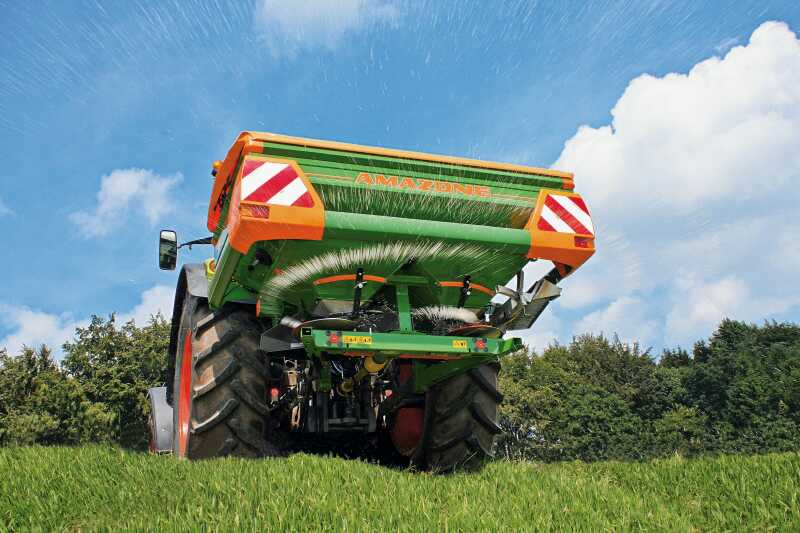
View of a tractor-operated broadcast seeder moved by three-point hitch and driven by PTO shaft

The basic operating concept of broadcast spreads is simple. A large material hopper is positioned over (in the centrifugal types) a horizontal spinning disk. The disk has a series of 3 or 4 fins attached to it which throw the dropped materials from the hopper out and away from the seeder/spreader. Alternately a pendulum spreading mechanism may be employed, this method is more common in mid-sized commercial spreaders for improved consistency in spreading. The photos clearly show the material hopper. Hoppers are commonly made of plastic, painted steel, or stainless steel. Stainless steel is usually used in large commercial units for strength and because granular fertilizer is often quite corrosive.

Some seeders/spreaders have directional fins to control the direction of the material that is thrown from the spreader. All broadcast spreaders require some form of power to spin the disk. On hand carried units, a hand crank spins gears to turn the disk. On tow behind units, the wheels spin a shaft that turns gears which, in turn, spin the disk. As is partially visible in one of the photos, with tractor mounted units, a mechanical P.T.O. shaft connected to the tractor and controlled by the tractor operator, spins the disk. There are some seeder/spreaders made for garden size tractors that use a 12 volt motor to spin the dispersing disk and yaw. Broadcast spreaders can also be used under drones.

== See also ==
- Manure spreader
- Seed drill
- Planter (farm implement)
