= Planter (farm implement) =

Agricultural farm implement (machine)

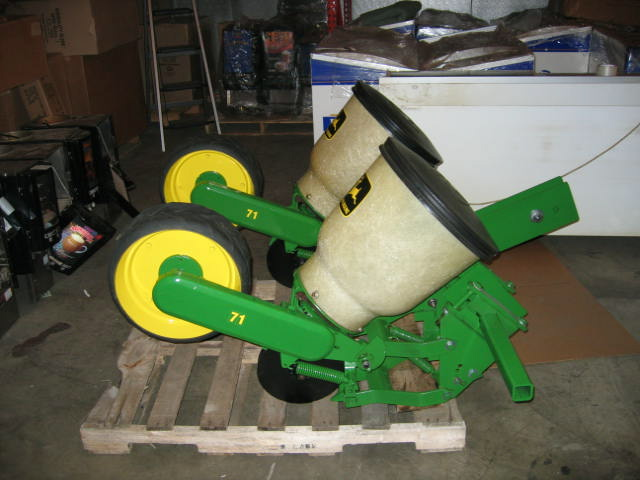
A two row planter featuring John Deere "71 Flexi" row units

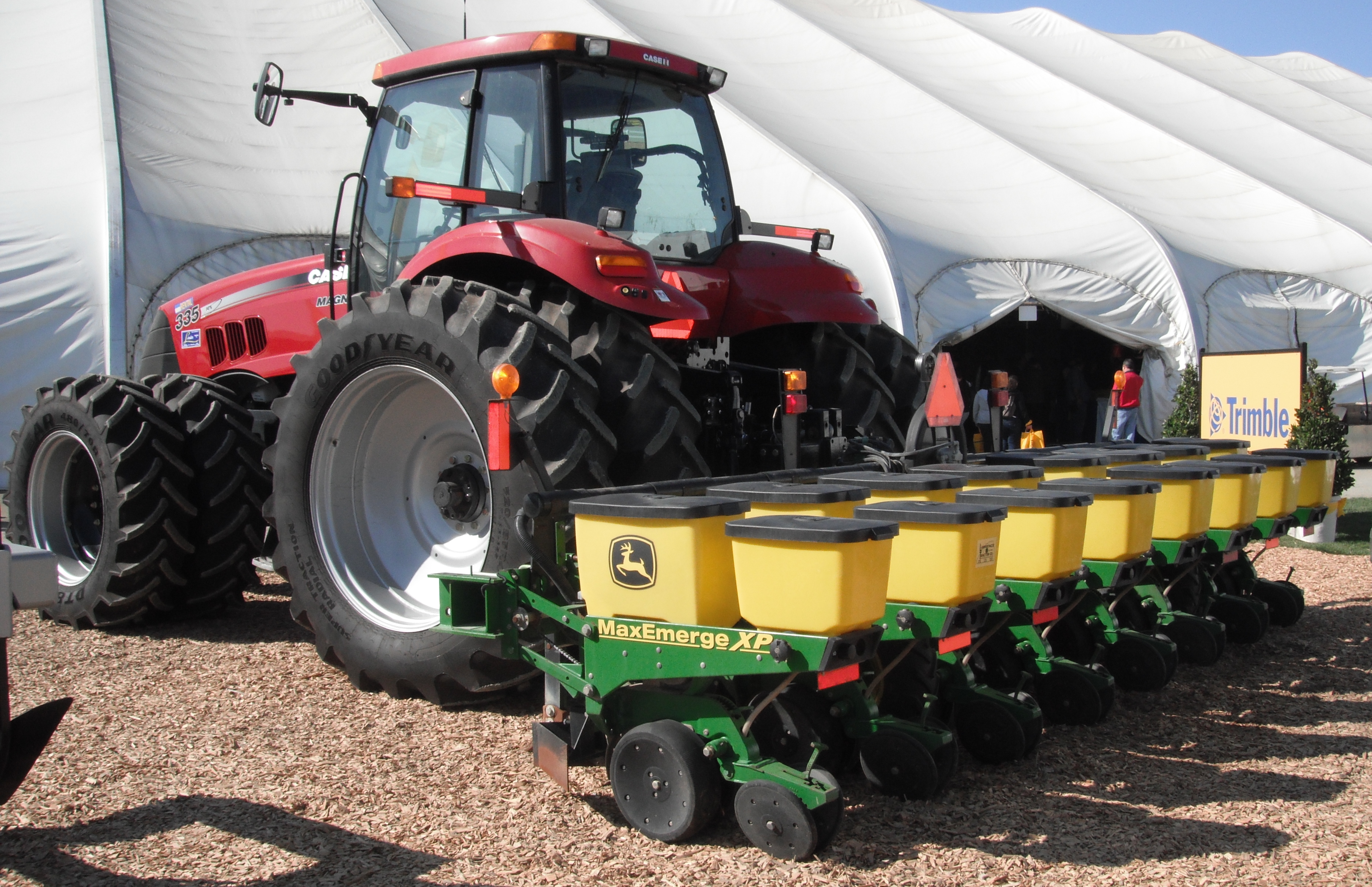
John Deere MaxEmerge XP Planter with Case IH AFS precision farming system which auto-steers using GPS

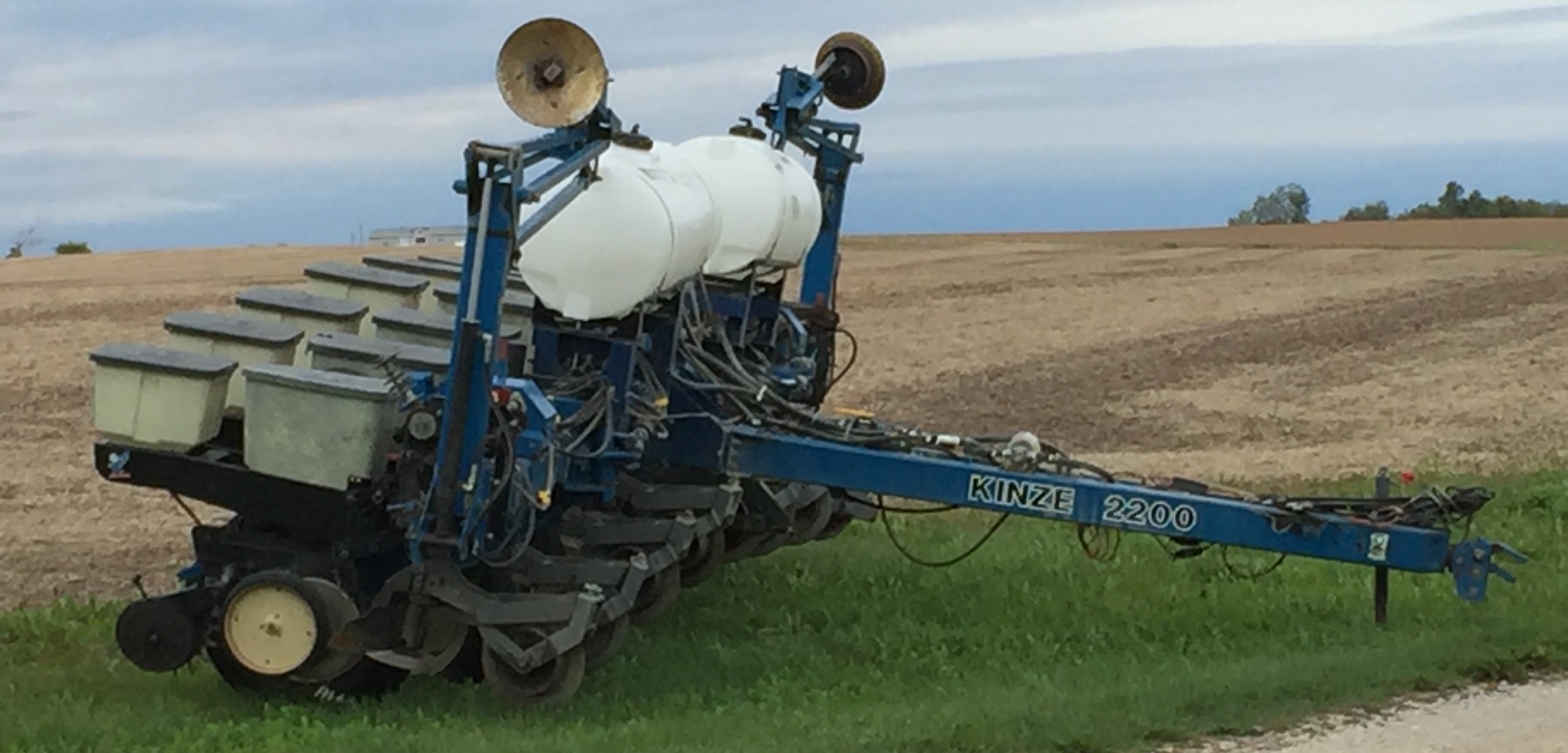
A Kinze 2200 planter

A planter is a farm implement, usually towed behind a tractor, that sows (plants) seeds in rows throughout a field. It is connected to the tractor with a drawbar or a three-point hitch. Planters lay the seeds down in precise manner along rows. Planters vary greatly in size, from 1 row to 54, with the biggest in the world being the 48-row John Deere DB120. Such larger and newer planters comprise multiple modules called row units. The row units are spaced evenly along the planter at intervals that vary widely by crop and locale. The most common row spacing in the United States today is 30 inches.

== Design ==
Various machines meter out seeds for sowing in rows. The ones that handle larger seeds tend to be called planters, whereas the ones that handle smaller seeds tend to be called seed drills, grain drills, and seeders (including precision seeders). They all share a set of similar concepts in the ways that they work, but there is established usage in which the machines for sowing some crops including maize (corn), beans, and peas are mostly called planters, whereas those that sow cereals are drills.

On smaller and older planters, a marker extends out to the side half the width of the planter and creates a line in the field where the tractor should be centered for the next pass. The marker is usually a single disc harrow disc on a rod on each side of the planter. On larger and more modern planters, GPS navigation and auto-steer systems for the tractor are often used, eliminating the need for the marker. Some precision farming equipment such as Case IH AFS uses GPS/RKS and computer-controlled planter to sow seeds to precise position accurate within 2 cm. In an irregularly shaped field, the precision farming equipment will automatically hold the seed release over area already sewn when the tractor has to run overlapping pattern to avoid obstacles such as trees.

Older planters commonly have a seed bin for each row and a fertilizer bin for two or more rows. In each seed bin plates are installed with a certain number of teeth and tooth spacing according to the type of seed to be sown and the rate at which the seeds are to be sown. The tooth size (actually the size of the space between the teeth) is just big enough to allow one seed in at a time but not big enough for two. Modern planters often have a large bin for seeds that are distributed to each row known as central commodity systems.

A class of planters that dig down farther than others are called listers. They are not used much any more, as their use belonged to a set of high-till methods that low-till and no-till methods have largely replaced. Corn listers were common on the Great Plains in the 1920s through 1950s.

== Drive systems ==
There are different types of planters available with the main difference being mechanically driven vs. hydraulic/electrical driven. In a mechanical drive system the unit works by a small suspended tire being driven by another which is in contact with the ground (driven) tire. As the operator lowers the planter the two tires make contact and the planter is engaged. When the driven wheel begins to turn it then turns a series of gears that determine the population of the seed produced. The gears can be changed by the operator in order to change the planting population. A hydraulic driven system came about to correct the shortfalls of the ground driven system. Hydraulic driven systems allow the operator to change population on the go, as well as allowing the computer controller to follow a prepared prescription for an individual field. The system also allowed for plant populations to be infinite in that mechanical gears systems are limited to set number of population settings and gears available from manufactures. In 2014 John Deere introduced the ExactEmerge row unit which introduced high-speed planting. Precision Planting followed suit and released the vDrive system. These systems were unique, not that they were electrical, but that they allowed an operator to double their speed when planting. Other manufacturers had already developed an electrical planter, but lacked these additional improvements. Traditionally, an operator would plant at about 4.5-5.5 mph for optimal performance. However, with the advent of these systems electrical motors match the speed of the tractor and "dead-drop" the seed in the trench using either a belt or brush-belt which cause the forward momentum of the planter to be offset by the rearward momentum of the seed. Older systems would instead drop the seed through a tube after the meter rather than place it in the seed trench directly.

== See also ==
- Seed drill
