= SNVI =

Algerian vehicle manufacturer and modifier

- Logo of the SNVI, first introduced in 1967.

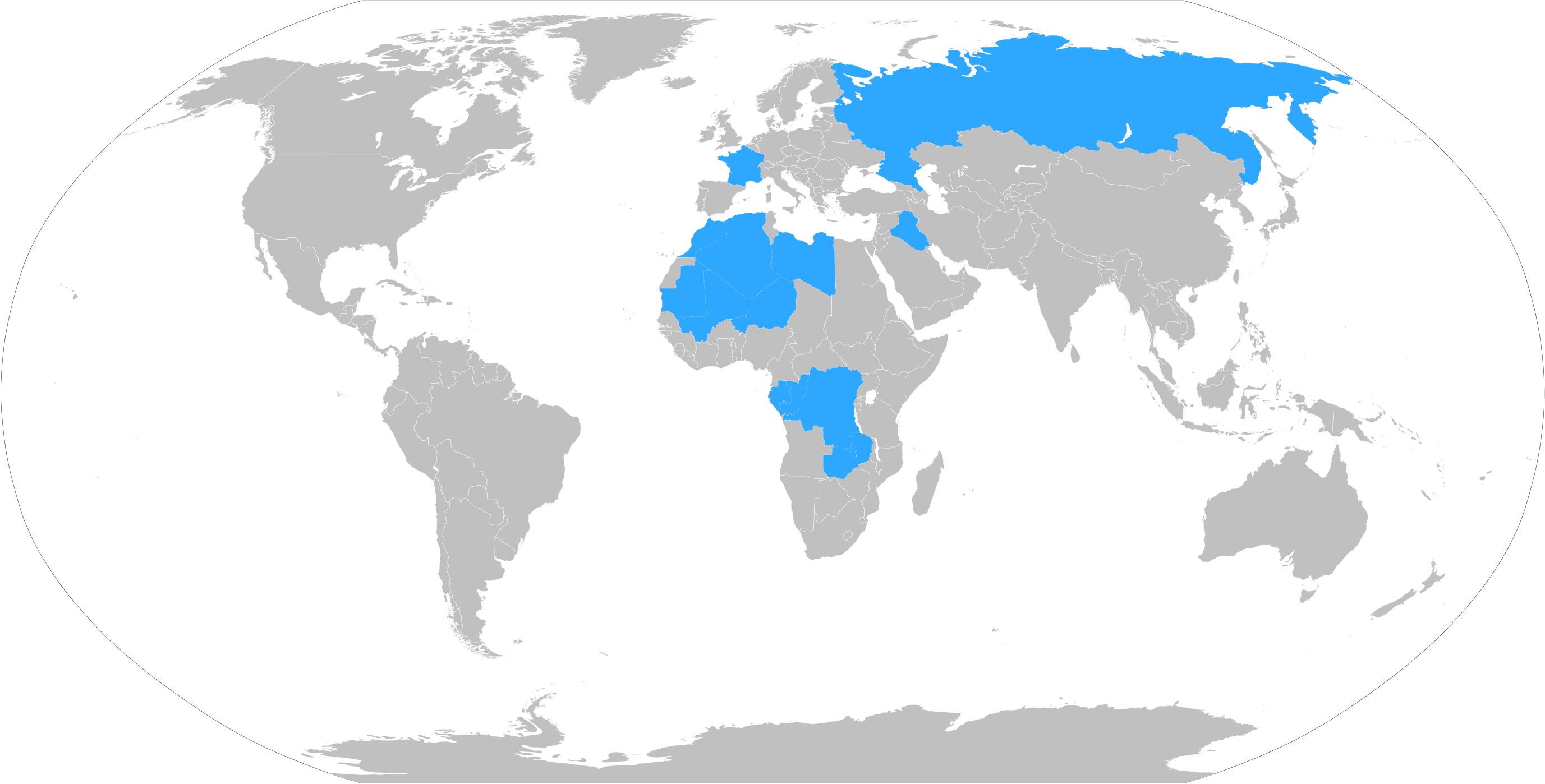
- SNVI international exportations.
- Native name: المؤسسة الوطنية للعربات الصناعية
- Industry: Automotive
- Predecessor: Berliet Algeria
- Founded: 1967
- Founder: State of Algeria
- Headquarters: Rouiba, Algeria
- Area served: Algeria
- Key people: Mustapha Meghdouri (CEO)
- Products: Trucks; Buses/Coaches; Trailers; Tractors; Military Vehicles
- Revenue: ▲DZD 20 billion (2011) (approx. US$ 250 million)
- Owner: Algerian State (Algerian Army) (100%)
- Number of employees: ~7000 (2023)
- Parent: Sonacome
- Website: snvigroupe.dz

SNVI (Arabic: المؤسسة الوطنية للعربات الصناعية; French: Société Nationale des Véhicules Industriels), formerly the National Society of Mechanical Construction (SONACOME, الشركة الوطنية للهندسة الميكانيك), is an Algerian automaker headquartered in Rouïba that has produced trucks and buses since 1967. The public company also manufactures Mercedes-Benz vehicles.

== History ==
The origins of the company dates back to the colonial era. On June 2, 1957, the French company Berliet established an assembly plant in Algeria to manufacture trucks and buses. The first vehicle assembled in Algeria rolled off the production line on October 15, 1958.

the state took a 40% stake in the company in 1964 via the National Development Fund.

Sonacome (Arabic: الشركة الوطنية للهندسة الميكانيك; French: Société Nationale de Construction Mecanique) was founded by the Algerian government on August 9, 1967, through ordonnance 67-150. It inherited colonial Berliet factories and equipment after the latter ceased operations in 1973.

In 1980, Sonacome's M210 was the winner of the second edition of the Paris-Dakar rally.

In May 1995, SNVI changed its legal status to become a public economic company governed by common law; SNVI was then set up as a joint-stock company (SPA) with a share capital of 2.2 billion Dinars.

Although the Algerian government tried numerous times to save the company by injecting money into it, It came close to going bankrupt multiple times.

In February 2021, the Minister of Industry, Ferhat Aït Ali, announced that the SNVI will be attached to the Directorate of Military Industries under the Ministry of National Defense

== Facilities ==
SNVI's headquarters are located in Rouiba, 20 km to the east of Algiers, with branches in Hussein Dey, Constantine, Oran, and Ouargla.

== Production ==
In 2011, the company made 2,007 vehicles. Its ambition is to return to its 1980s production rate, which was around 6,000 vehicles per year.

== Exports ==
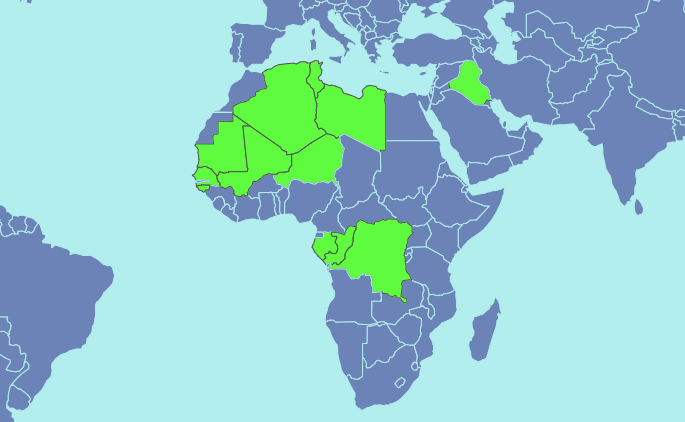
SNVI Exportation

SNVI exports its products to several countries, including Democratic Republic of the Congo, Iraq, Gabon, Guinea-Bissau.

== Models ==
Since 1967, SNVI produces trucks, buses, and semi-trailer.

=== Trucks ===
SNVI offers a variety of trucks for civilian and military purposes.

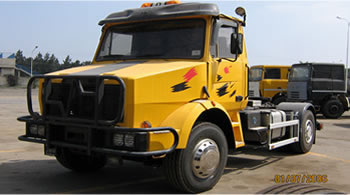
SNVI Military Truck TC260

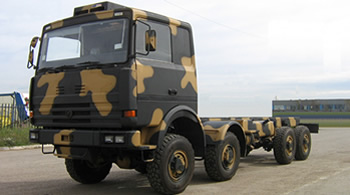
SNVI Military Truck M350

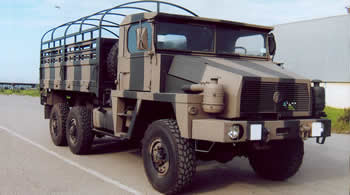
SNVI Military Truck

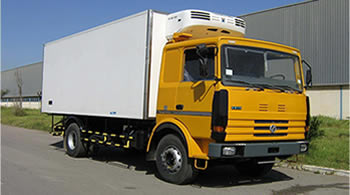
SNVI Refrigerator truck

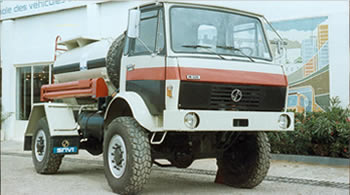
SNVI Truck All Terrain

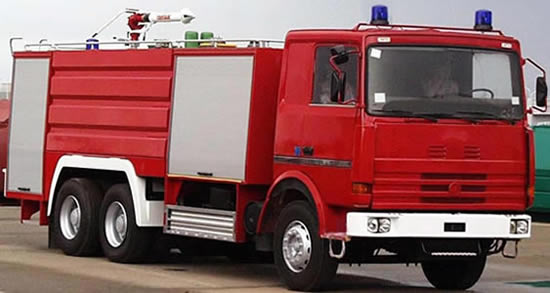
SNVI Firefighter truck

==== Civilian trucks ====
Type	Name	Start Production	End Production
Transport	SNVI K66	1975	—
Transport	SNVI K120	1975	—
Transport	SNVI C260	1975	2019
Transport	SNVI B260	1975	1990
Transport	SNVI B400	—	—
Semi-Trailer	SNVI TB400	—	—
Semi	SNVI TC260	—	—
All Terrain	SNVI M120	—	—
All Terrain	SNVI M230	1975	—

==== Military trucks ====
Type	Name	Start Production	End Production
All Terrain	SNVI M120	—	—
Semi-Trailer	SNVI M230	1975	—
All Terrain	SNVI M260	—	—
Semi-Trailer	SNVI M350	—	—
Transport	SNVI K66	1975	—
Transport	SNVI K120	1975	—
Transport	SNVI C260	1975	2019
Transport	SNVI B260	1975	1990
All-Terrain	SNVI B400	—	—

=== Buses ===
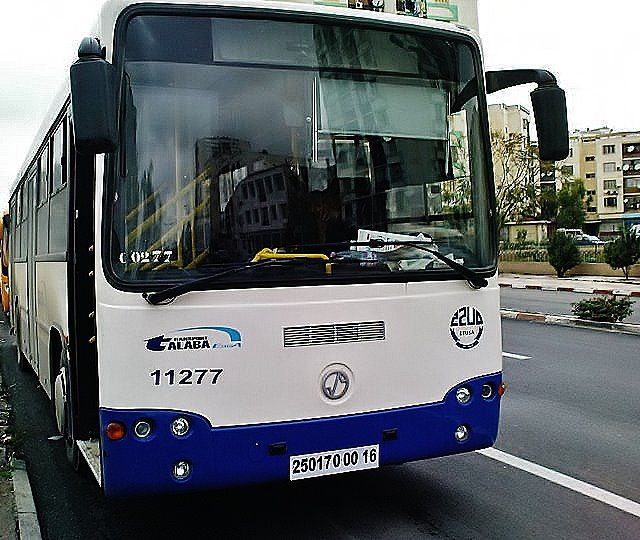
100L6 Talaba bus

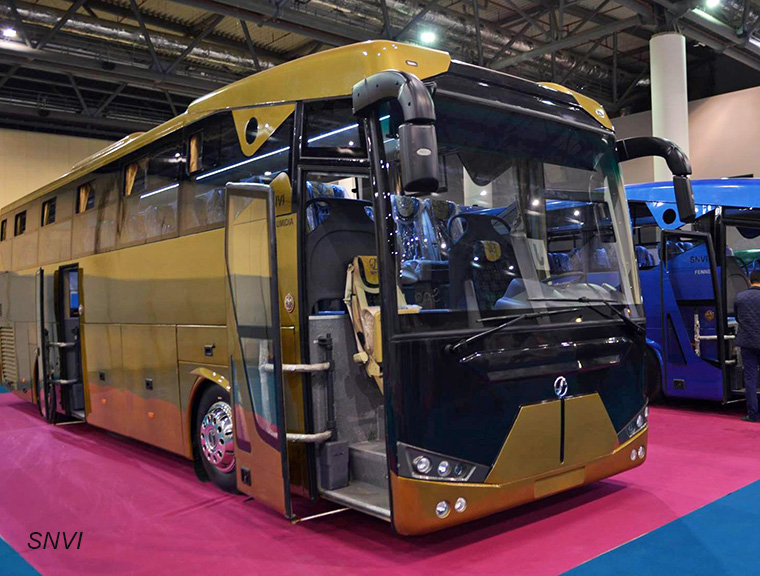
SNVI Bus Numedia Lux.

SNVI Buses

==== Civilian buses ====
Name	Number of Passengers
Minibus	25
SNVI Safir	49
SNVI Numidia Lux	47
SNVI Atakor	34

==== Military buses ====
Name	Number of Passengers
Minibus	36
Versatile Intervention Vehicle	18

=== Semi trailers ===
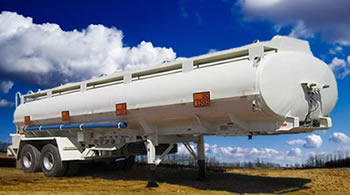
SNVI Tanker

- Tanker – 30 000L
- Cement mixer
- Low-boy trailer
- Trailer CEP 3000L
- Tippers
