= Sonacome =

Algerian Construction Equipment Manufacturer

SONACOME (Société Nationale de Construction Mecanique) is an Algerian construction equipment maker.

Established in Algiers in 1967, the company has produced an off road vehicle for the Dakar Rally.

Many trucks produced by the company were sold at production cost or cheaper during the country's agrarian revolution. In 2017, SONACOME-SNVI became a subsidiary of the Algerian defense ministry.

SNVI, a truck manufacturer, is a subsidiary.

== Products ==
- M210 transport truck
- C260 transport truck
- b350 transport truck
- K66 dump truck
- K120 transport truck
- K66 transport truck
- 49V8 Autocar
- 100v8 Autobus
- Safir Autocar
- 100 L6 Autobus

=== Trucks ===
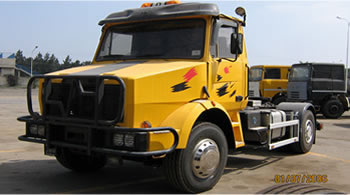
SNVI Military Truck TC260

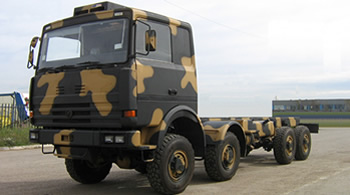
SNVI Military Truck M350

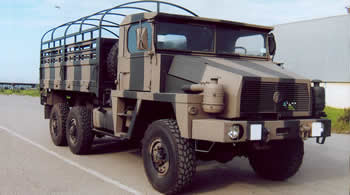
SNVI Military Truck M230

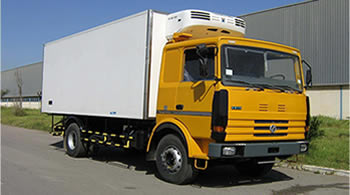
SNVI Refrigerator Truck

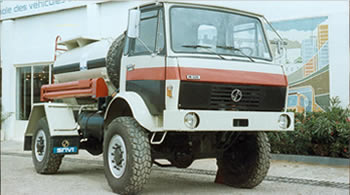
SNVI All-Terrain Truck M120

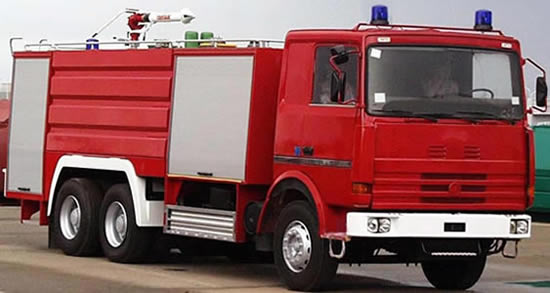
SNVI Firefighter Truck

=== Buses ===
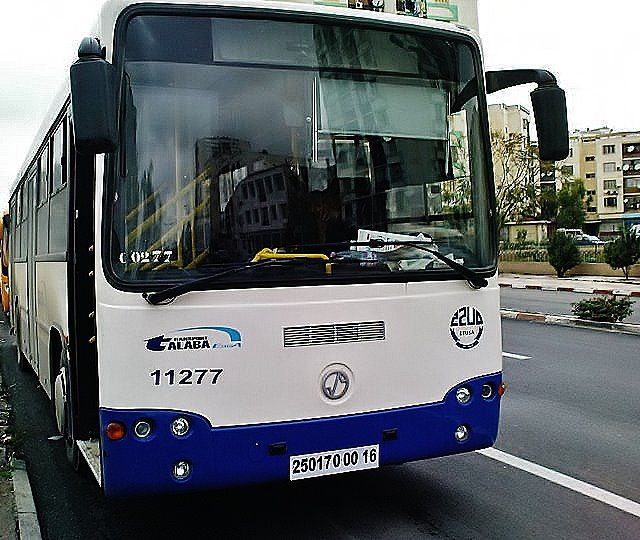
100L6 Talaba Bus

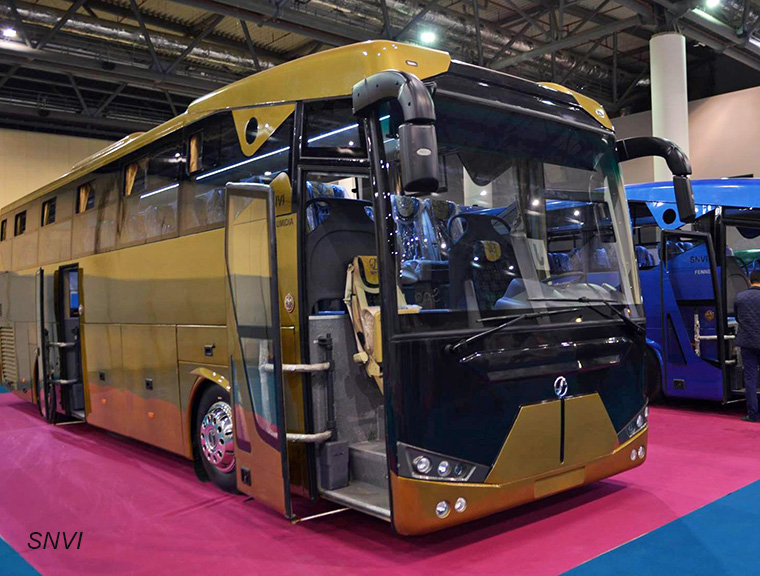
SNVI Bus Numedia Lux
