= Agricultural machinery industry =

Subsector of the industry

The agricultural machinery industry or agricultural engineering industry is the part of the industry, that produces and maintain tractors, agricultural machinery and agricultural implements used in farming or other agriculture. This branch is considered to be part of the machinery industry.

== History ==
See also history of Agricultural machinery and Mechanised agriculture

=== 19th century ===
The agricultural machinery industry emerged in Britain and the United States in the 19th century. Until then the common tools of farming were the plough and the sickle. These iron agricultural implements were often made by blacksmiths in the local village, who regularly also acted as farrier. In the first part of the 19th century some of the early agricultural machine manufacturers arose from these blacksmith workshops, such as John Deere who started up with the production of ploughs in series in the 1840s.

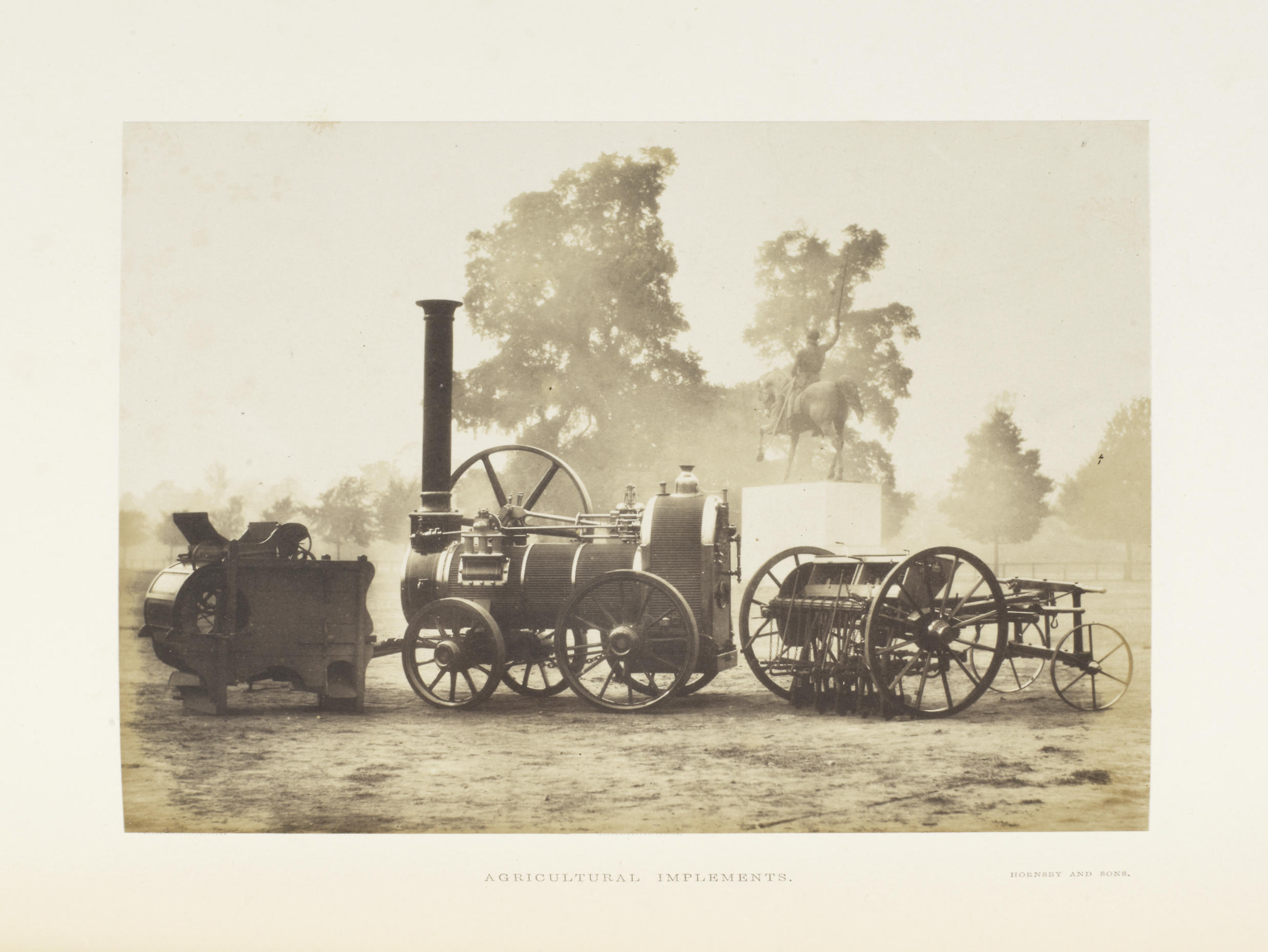
Agricultural Implements, 1851.

Other companies arose from the introduction of horse drawn reaping, which replaced the type of hand reaper in use since biblical times. A company as the McCormick started up with building these kind of harvesting machines around the 1840s. And another origin of agricultural industry was the introduction of combined harvesting, threshing and cleaning in the 1830s. The Case Corporation for example started building those in 1842 as the Racine Threshing Machine Works. Until early 20th century most of those machinery were powered by horses.

Mid 19th century the portable steam-powered plowing engines were introduced. They were used in pairs, placed on either side of a field to haul a plow back and forth between them using a wire cable. These portable engines were also used to power threshing machines, mills and pumps. The portable steam engines were produced by specific agricultural machinery maker, such as Ransomes, Sims & Jefferies who had started as brass and iron-founder making casting ploughshares late 18th century.

Late 19th century in Britain more companies such as Richard Garrett & Sons and Mann’s Patent Steam Cart and Wagon Company developed steam tractors for direct ploughing, but the heavy, wet soil of England meant that these designs were less economical than a team of horses. In the United States, where soil conditions permitted, steam tractors were used to direct-haul plows. Steam-powered agricultural engines remained in use well into the 20th century until reliable internal combustion engines had been developed.

Collins (1987) recalled that the impact of the agricultural machinery industry in the 19th century was still limited. He stated : "prior the third quarter of the nineteenth century the impact of machinery in agriculture was slight compared with that in manufacturing industry. Some operations such as barn work and hay and corn harvesting had been largely mechanized by 1880 but, up to the Second World War, many were still performed by hand labour and large numbers of workers were still required for seasonal tasks such as hop- and fruit-picking and vegetable cultivations."

=== 20th century ===
In the beginning of the 20th century in the UK the Agricultural machinery industry "although composed of many hundreds of firms, was dominated by a few large ones, chiefly in the eastern counties of England. The total output of the industry was estimated to be worth 6.5 million pounds in 1913, or about 5 percent of the total value of the output of the mechanical engineering industry at the first Census of Production in 1907."

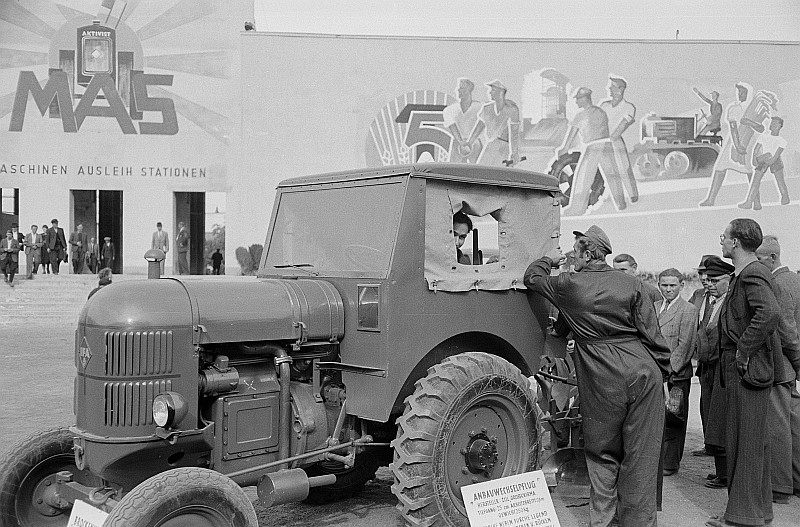
Agricultural exhibitions, 1951

In the first decennia the internal combustion engine; first the petrol engine, and later diesel engines; became the main source of power for the next generation of tractors. Early companies expanded into the tractor business, such as John Deere which bought the Waterloo Gasoline Engine Company in 1918, which manufactured the popular Waterloo Boy tractor. In the 1930s new technologies as rubber ties and hydrologics were introduced in tractors and other farm machinery. The diesel engines also contributed to the development of the self-propelled, combined harvester and thresher, or combine harvester (also shortened to 'combine'). Instead of cutting the grain stalks and transporting them to a stationary threshing machine, these combines cut, threshed, and separated the grain while moving continuously through the field.

In the second part of the 20th century the production of agricultural machinery in development countries rose rapidly. In the 1960s a country as the UK exported more than 60% of its production to Western Europe, Australia, USA, Canada and South Africa, and main manufacturers started production plants abroad. Another trend was the increased concentration among manufacturers. In the 1970s in the UK six companies supplied 75% of the total output.

The further mechanization of agriculture in the 20th century made possible by the agricultural machinery industry had a huge impact of the economic structure of society. In the developed countries the total labour force engaged in agriculture dropped from about 75% in 1800 to less than 5% late 20th century. In developing countries, in late 20th century still 75% of all land "was farmed with only hand-tools and draught-animal technology." In Turkey still 48% and in India 66.5% of the labor were working in agriculture, according to the FAO Production Yearbook 1990.

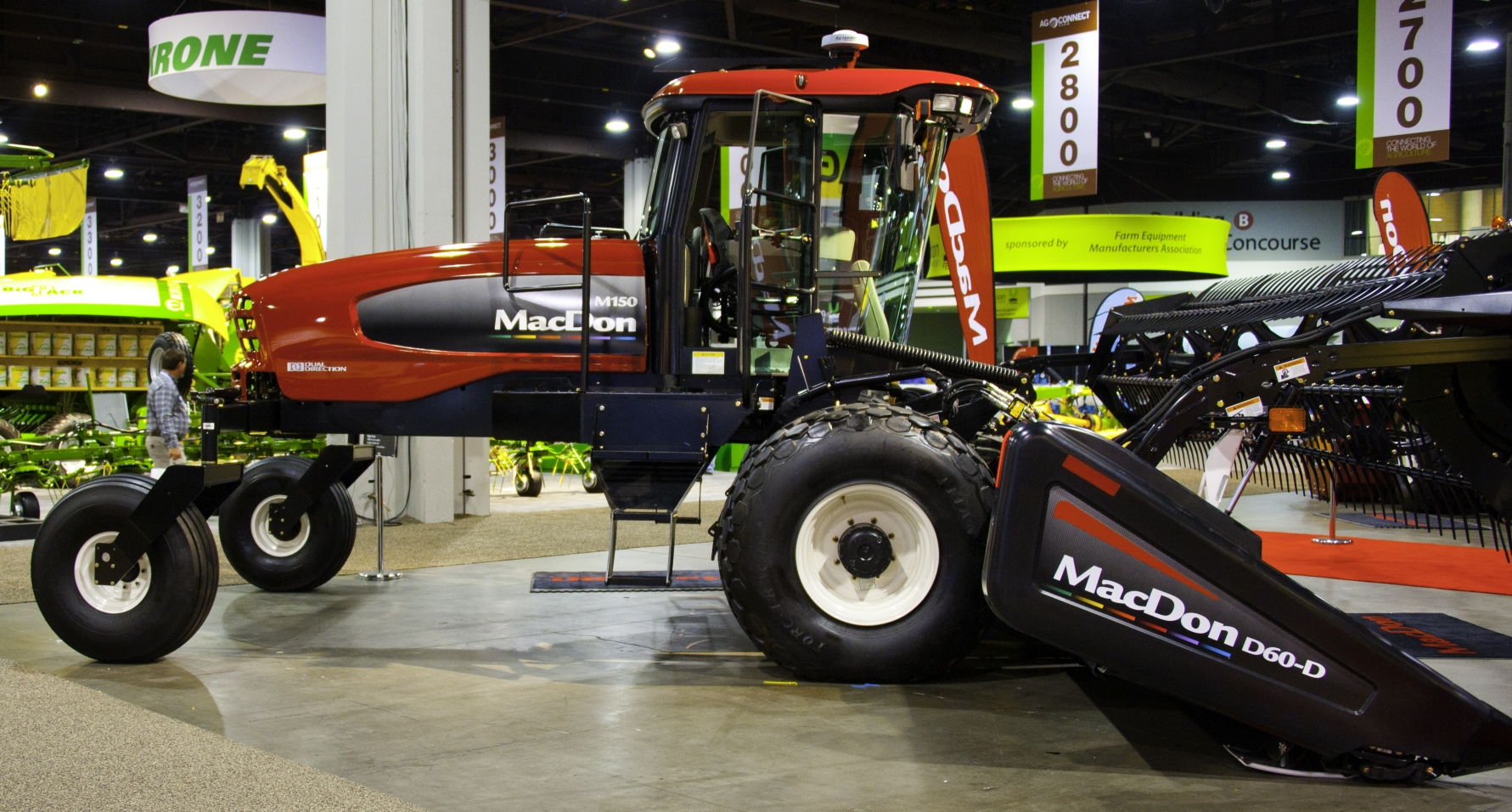
AFBF 2011 exhibition, Atlanta, Georgia, USA.

=== 21st century ===
A 2013 report by the VDMA gave the following preview of the current developments in the agricultural machinery industry:

The general trends in society, agriculture and technology allow conclusions about the future requirements profile for agricultural machinery... The depicted dominating topics for the agricultural sector are

- Precision & automation
- Efficiency & user friendliness
- Communication & networking

These topics are today already central components of the specifications for new developments ...

== Agricultural machinery ==
The agricultural machinery industry produces agricultural machinery, machinery used in the operation of agricultural areas and farms. Main types are:

- Tractors and power.
- Machinery for tillage or soil cultivation.
- Machinery for planting, seeding, fertilizing, pest control, irrigation.
- Machinery for harvesting, haymaking, and post-harvest, such as produce sorters, and machinery for loading
- Machinery for milking
- Other agricultural machinery, for example grinder mixers, wool presses and windmills.

In developed countries overall the largest segment of agricultural equipment sales is tractors.

== Agricultural machinery manufacturers ==
Agricultural machinery manufacturers exist in sizes from small and medium business to multinationals. James & Akrasanee (1988) stipulated that those forms have different production management, and can be classified into three groups:

- The first group consists of those workshops with limited and simple equipment. Despite their flexibility, the production management system is very rare in this case.
- The second group includes those with certain degrees of division of labour within the plant. They do organize some plant layout, but not in a fully systematic manner.
- The last group constitutes those with clear production lines and division of labour.

The two largest agricultural machinery manufacturers worldwide based on revenue (in 2012):

- John Deere : $37.79 billion revenues and employing 67,000 people worldwide in 2013. Its workforce has increased significantly in the past decennia from 43.000 in 2002 to 67.000 in 2013.
- CNH Industrial : $19.4 billion revenues and employing 33.800 people worldwide in 2013.

In the United States the revenue of tractor & agricultural machinery manufacturing sector increased from about 35 billion U.S. dollars in 2009 to 42 billion U.S. dollars in 2014.

=== Active ===
- AGCO
- Agrale
- Agrinar
- Al-Ghazi Tractors
- Algerian Tractors Company
- Arbos
- ARGO SpA
- Basak Traktor
- Carraro Agritalia
- Case IH
- Challenger Tractors
- Claas
- CNH Industrial
- Daedong
- Deutz-Fahr
- Erkunt Tractor
- Escorts Limited
- Fendt
- Goldoni
- Iseki
- JCB
- John Deere
- Kharkiv Tractor Plant
- Kirov Plant
- Kubota
- Lamborghini Trattori
- Landini
- Lindner
- LS Mtron
- Mahindra Tractors
- Massey Ferguson
- McCormick Tractors
- Millat Tractors
- Minsk Tractor Works
- Mitsubishi Agricultural Machinery
- New Holland Agriculture
- Pronar
- Shibaura
- Sonalika Tractors
- SAME
- SAS Motors
- SDF Group
- Steyr
- TAFE
- TYM
- Ursus SA
- Valpadana
- Valtra
- Versatile
- Yanmar
- YTO Group
- Zetor
- Zoomlion

=== Former ===
- Allis-Chalmers
- Case Corporation
- Ferguson-Brown Company
- Fiat Trattori
- Ford
- International Harvester
- Leyland Tractors
- Massey-Harris
- Renault Agriculture

== Agricultural machinery associations ==
Some of the more important agricultural machinery associations are:

- Agricultural Engineers Association (AEA): British trade association which represents manufacturers and importers of agricultural machinery and outdoor equipment.
- Agrievolution: global network of agricultural machinery associations.
- Association of Equipment Manufacturers (AEM): American association which represents manufacturers of agricultural machinery.
- CEMA: European association representing the agricultural machinery industry in Europe.
- Mechanical Engineering Industry Association(VDMA): German manufacturers' association which represents manufacturers of agricultural machinery.

== Global agricultural machinery industry ==
According to the CEMA, the European association representing the European agricultural machinery industry, Europe was the largest producer of agricultural machinery globally in 2013:

- Europe produced 31% of the global production
- North America produced 26.5% of the global production,
- China produced 26.5% of the global production, and
- The remaining 16% is produced elsewhere.

In total, the production of agricultural machinery worldwide in 2013 generated about 95 billion euros, based on a report Agricultural Machinery November 2013 : Market Perspectives 2014 by the VDMA, a German engineering association. Another recent statistic mentioned, that the agricultural machinery industry in 2010 generated worldwide about $56 billion.

=== Agricultural machinery industry in Europe ===
With a volume of 28 billion euros (2014) agricultural machinery production in the European Union (EU) represented 28 per cent of world total according to VDMA. Out of the EU total, the share of Germany is 27 per cent, followed by Italy (17 per cent) and France (14 per cent). All leading international manufacturers have several production sites on the European continent, and their products from these factories in general are destined for the customers who yield for efficiency and accuracy on the fields.

The EU production of tractors was 187,000 units, correspondent to a value of 9.4 billion euros (2014). Outside the EU, a major production site for tractors is the Minsk Tractor Works (Belarus) with a high market share in the neighbouring countries, especially within the Commonwealth of Independent States. The leading countries for tractor production in the EU are Germany and Italy (with John Deere, Case New Holland, AGCO and Same Deutz-Fahr being the major brands). Germany is also the major place for the manufacturing of harvesting, spraying, fertilizing and seeding equipment. Italy and France have a primary position for soil working machines and transportation vehicles. The majority of the agricultural machinery companies are small and medium-sized and family owned.

One third of the EU production is destined to markets outside the union, mainly to the Eastern European markets, but also to North America and, increasingly, to Asia.

After a peak in 2003 and 29 billion euros of turnover, the sector experienced an economic downturn in 2014/2015. The strategy of the European industry is to keep its leading technological position and to diversify its market presence into the high potential regions (e.g. Asia).

=== Agricultural machinery industry in North America ===
In 2014, the AEM stated that "U.S. domestic sales of agricultural machinery and equipment rose from about $20 billion in 1999 to $38 billion in 2012. Since 1998 and through 2012, U.S. exports of agricultural equipment have grown relatively quickly, more than doubling from about $4 billion to $8.7 billion.

In 2021, the AEM reported an increase in sales of new agricultural machinery for the U.S. market. There also an 27% increase of new machinery manufacturing for this year. AEM members are also anticipating a 6% to 10% increase in agriculture machinery demand over the next 12 months. In the report is mentioned that in 2021 the U.S. is the world's leader in producing agricultural machinery.

=== Agricultural machinery industry in South America ===
Graciela summarized (2008) that "the agricultural machinery industry in Argentina depends for growth on higher exports and further progress towards internationalization, which are strategic goals for the largest firms. Given the dynamism of global demand for this type of machinery, the conclusion is that the sector can increase its sales in export markets, where some of its products are competing well."

=== Agricultural machinery industry in Asia ===
Yuan'en (2007) stated, that the "Chinese government has attached great importance to agriculture, rural areas and farmers, made a series of policies that favorite to the farmers, added the financial subsidy to the agriculture, especially constituted the subsidy policies for the farmers on their agricultural machinery purchasing."

A 2013-2014 report acknowledged that "China's agricultural machinery industry has achieved rapid development, the gross output value of agricultural machinery exceeded RMB 300 billion, total power of agricultural machinery surpassed 1 billion kilowatts, and the integrated mechanization level of agricultural crops exceeded 50%, demonstrating that China has entered into a mechanized production-oriented period.... Tractors and harvesting machinery are the most important agricultural machinery products in China, with annual output of 2.25 million units and 1.114 million units in 2012 separately...

Gyanendra (2006) recalled, that "the early agricultural mechanization in India was greatly influenced by the technological development in England. Irrigation pumps, tillage equipment, chaff cutters, tractors and threshers were gradually introduced for farm mechanization. The high yielding varieties with assured irrigation and higher rate of application of fertilizers gave higher returns that enabled farmers to adopt mechanization inputs, especially after Green revolution in 1960s."

The Turkish Ministry of Economy (2011) explained that "Turkey is one of the few countries of the world which is self-sufficient in food. At present Turkey is the largest producer and exporter of agricultural products in the Near East and North Africa... The agricultural machinery industry is comprised of about 1000 manufacturers countrywide.... Companies manufacturing agricultural machinery and equipment except tractors are mostly small and medium size companies. The sector employs about 15,000 workers... The value of agricultural machinery and spare parts and agricultural tractors and trailers exports was US$ 313 million in 2009."

== See also ==
- Agribusiness
- Agriculture
- Agricultural engineering
- Mechanised agriculture
