= CEMA =

CEMA or Cema may stand for:

- CEMA = Council for the Encouragement of Music and the Arts, predecessor (1940) of the Arts Council of Great Britain
- CEMA (European agricultural machinery), an agricultural machinery association in Europe
- CEMA, The Council for Mutual Economic Assistance
- CEMA (record label distributor), a branch of Capitol-EMI
- California Ethnic and Multicultural Archives a repository of primary source materials from California's ethnic history
- Centre d'Essais de Matériels Aériens, a French aircraft test centre at Vélizy – Villacoublay Air Base
- Centro de Estudios Macroeconómicos de Argentina or Universidad del CEMA, a university in Buenos Aires
- Chef d'État-Major des Armées, the Chief of the Defence Staff of France
- Civil Emergency Measures Act, a law in Yukon responding to the COVID-19 pandemic
- Construction Equipment Manufacturers Association, a group which represents construction equipment manufacturers in Japan
- Committee for the Encouragement of Music and the Arts, the predecessor to the Arts Council of Great Britain
- Consumer Electronics Manufacturers Association, now the Consumer Electronics Association
- Cyber Electromagnetic Activities
