= Agrinar =

Argentine agricultural machinery company

Agrinar S.A.
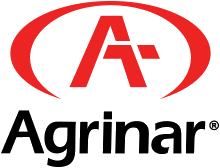
- Company type: Private
- Industry: Agricultural machinery
- Founded: 2002; 24 years ago
- Headquarters: Granadero Baigorria, Argentina
- Area served: Argentina
- Products: Tractors, Combine harvesters
- Website: agrinar.com.ar

Agrinar SA is an Argentine agricultural machinery manufacturing company based in the city of Granadero Baigorria in Santa Fe Province, Argentina. The company focuses on agricultural vehicles, producing mainly tractors but also combine harvesters and backhoe loaders.

It was founded in 2002, utilizing a former Massey Ferguson factory and designs. A lawsuit from AGCO, Massey Ferguson's parent company, brought about design changes.

== Products ==
=== Tractors ===
- T-85 2WD / 4WD
- T-100
- T-100 Super Alto
- T-110
- T-120 2WD / 4WD
- T-150
- T-170
- T-180
- TA 215

=== Combine harvesters ===
Commercialised under the Marani Agrimar name:

- AXIAL 3000 12s
- 3000
- 2121 M 10S
- 2140 HEE 12S Evolución 5

=== Heavy machinery ===
- CR-90
- MC 55 / 65 / 80
