= Iseki =

Japanese manufacturing company

Iseki & Co., Ltd.

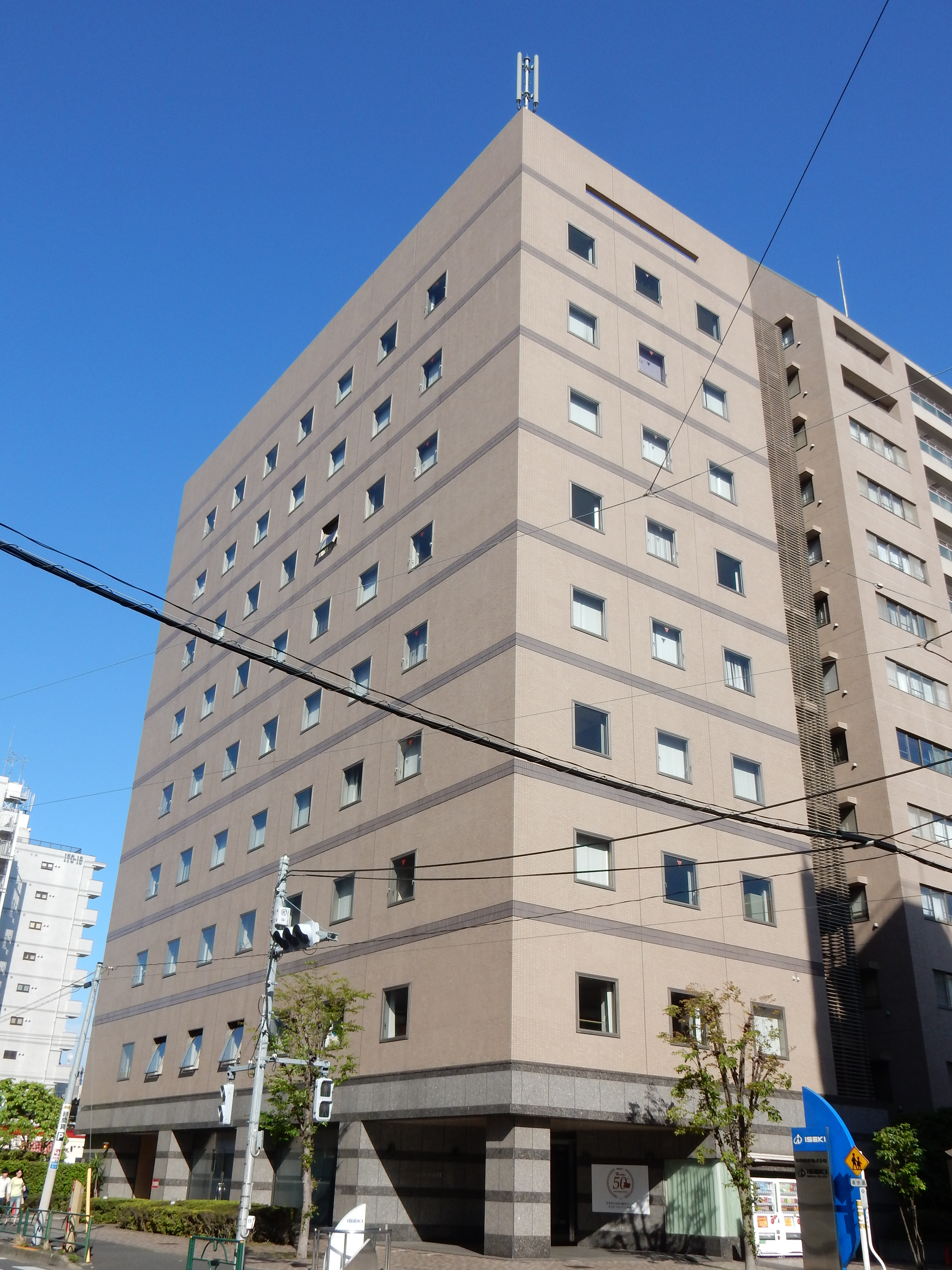
- Iseki's Tokyo headquarters
- Native name: 井関農機株式会社
- Type: Public (K.K)
- Traded as: TYO: 6310
- ISIN: JP3139600005
- Industry: Agricultural machinery
- Founded: August 1926; 99 years ago
- Headquarters: Matsuyama, Ehime, 799-2692; Arakawa, Tokyo (Tokyo headquarters), Japan,
- Area served: Worldwide
- Key people: Eiichiro Kinoshita (President)
- Products: Tractors; Combine harvesters Rice transplanters Riding mowers Zero-turn mowers Tillers; Diesel engines
- Revenue: JPY 158.3 billion (FY 2016) (US$ 1.4 billion) (FY 2016)
- Net income: JPY 2.8 billion (FY 2016) (US$ 25 million) (FY 2016)
- Number of employees: 5,853 (consolidated, as of December 31, 2016)
- Website: Official website

Iseki & Co., Ltd. (井関農機株式会社, Iseki Nōki Kabushiki-Gaisha), based in Matsuyama and Tokyo, Japan, is the third largest Japanese agricultural machinery manufacturing company. Its products include tractors, combine harvesters, rice transplanters, riding mowers, zero-turn mowers, tillers, components, and diesel engines.

It was founded in 1926 as Iseki Farm Implement Trading Co. (井関農具商会, Iseki Nōgu Shōkai) in Matsuyama, Ehime, Japan. It was incorporated in 1936 as Iseki & Co.

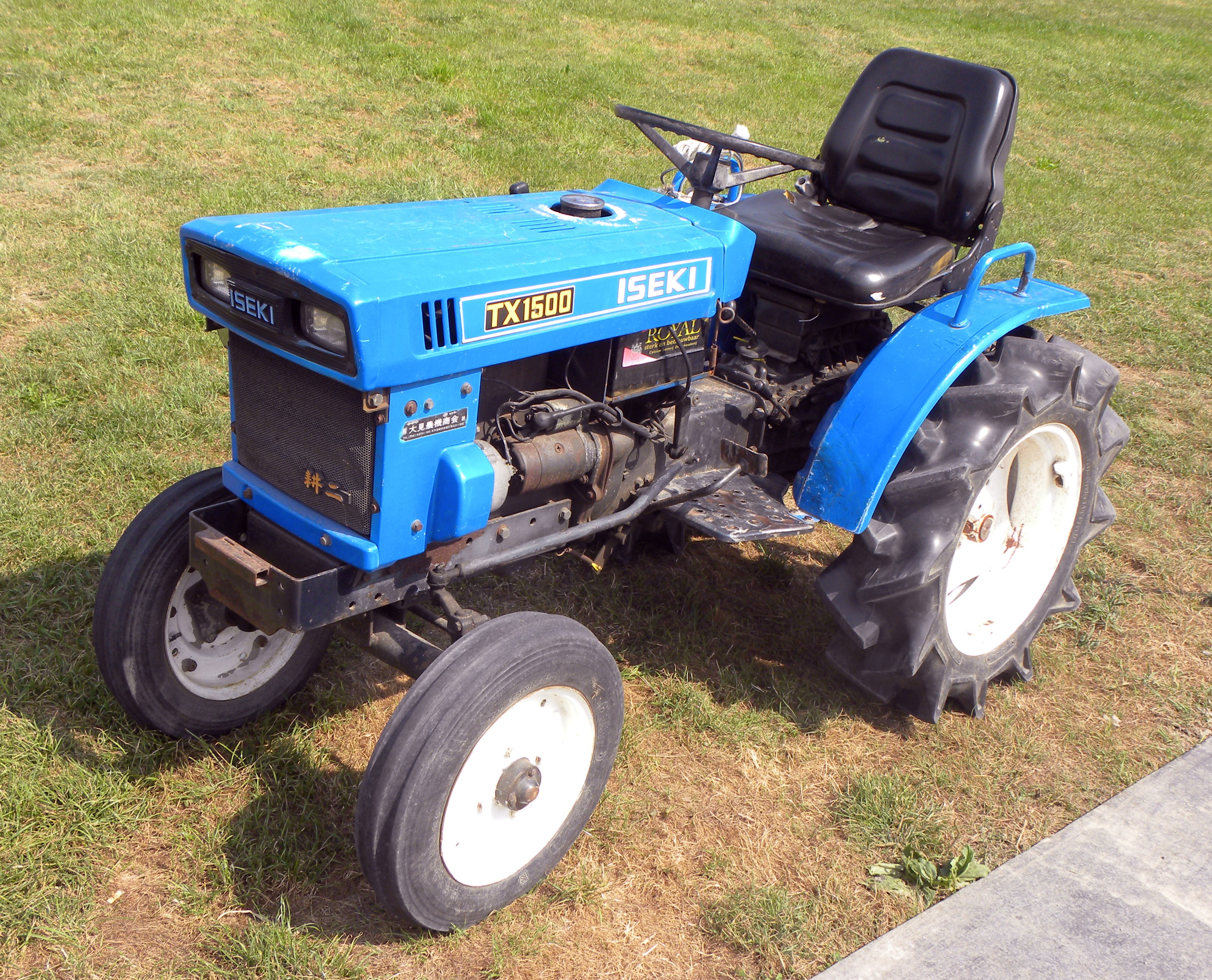
Iseki TX 1500 compact tractor from 1978

Iseki began building tractors in 1961. Early models of the Iseki tractor were built under Porsche-Diesel's technology and design transfer contract. Its tractors have been and are sold worldwide under various brands: AGCO, Bolens, Challenger, Massey Ferguson and White. Some models sold in Japan have been built by Landini of Italy and by Massey Ferguson in France.

Early TYM tractors were based on Iseki's designs and used Iseki's expertise.

Iseki also has joint ventures with other companies, among them Dongfeng Motor.

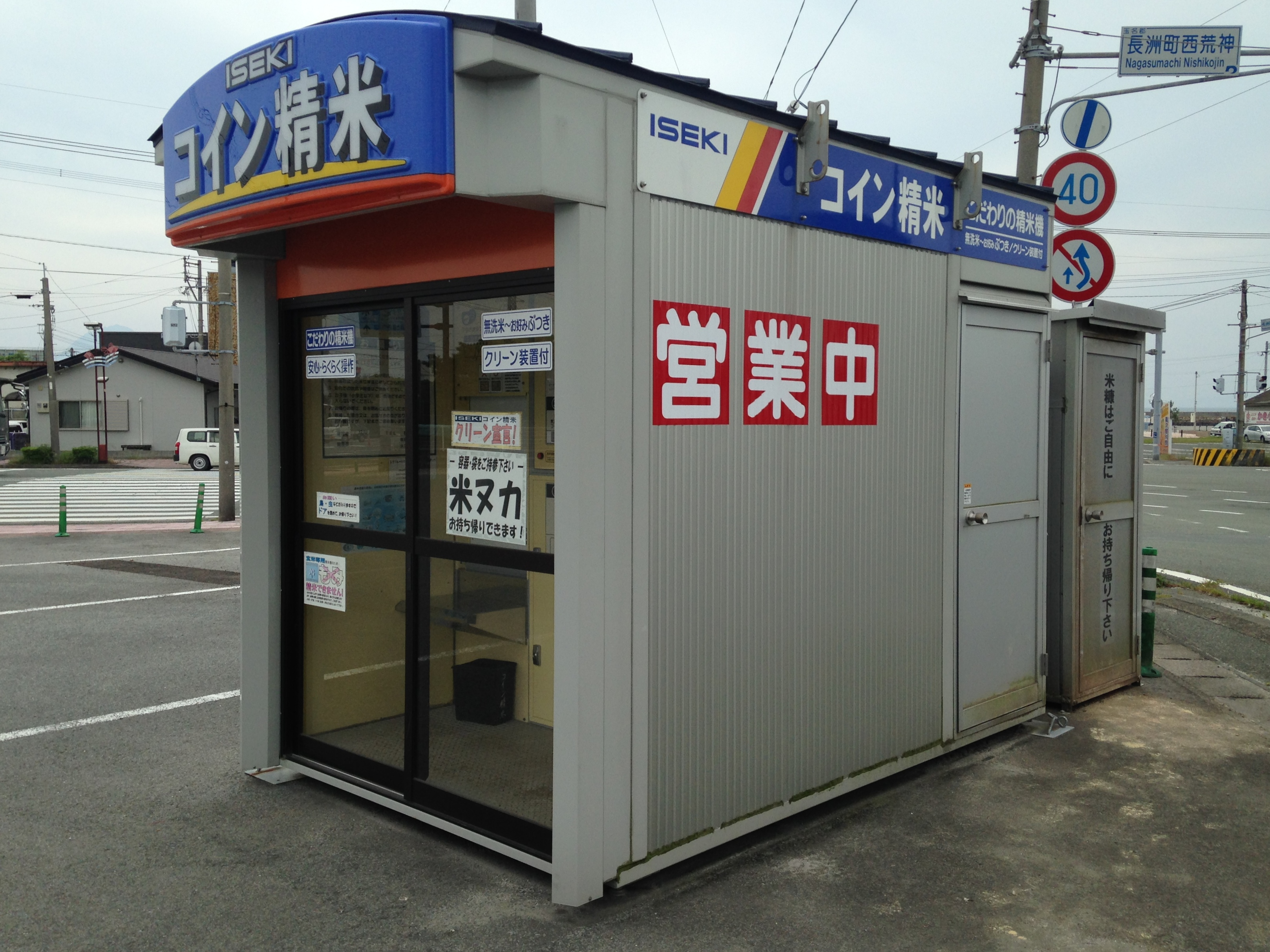
Iseki self-service automated rice mill in Nagasu, Kumamoto

Iseki have changed the way grass clippings are collected on their garden tractors. Unlike most machines where the grass is forced up over the transmission and other elements, the Iseki tractor has a system where the transmission is passed to the wheels by a series of chains, much like a rice paddy tractor.
