= Construction equipment theft =

Criminal act of stealing construction equipment

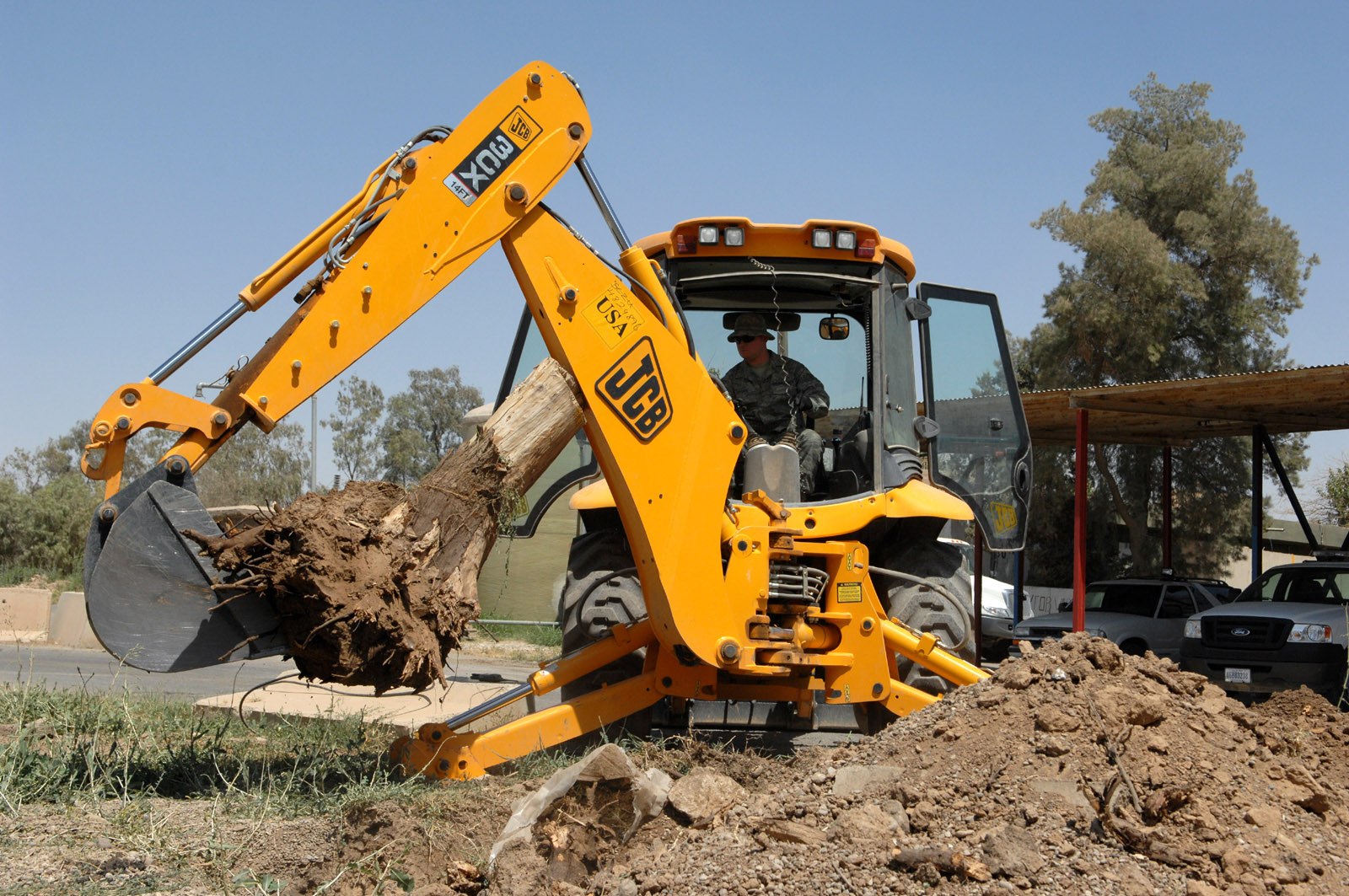
RA JCB 3CX backhoe at work. Backhoes (also called "rear actors" or "back actors") are one type of construction equipment stolen from construction sites and rental companies.

Construction equipment theft, is the criminal act of stealing or attempting to steal construction equipment, including all type of heavy equipments. Construction equipment theft has been recognized as a significant problem in the United States and elsewhere in the world, including Canada, Australia, Europe, and Japan.

== Incidents ==
Construction equipment is believed to be targeted by thieves because it is often poorly secured, easily disguised and very expensive. Some construction equipment can cost as much as $150,000. Backhoes can cost $45,000 to $55,000 (this and other figures in 2010 U.S. dollars); skid steer loaders, $25,000 to $35,000; generators, $25,000 to $150,000 (for trailer mounts); forklifts, $12,000 to $50,000.

Anti-theft measures taken for registered motor vehicles are often not used on construction equipment: open cabs of construction equipment can be easy for thieves to access; equipment often has "one key fits all" ignition systems; construction equipment often does not have standardized vehicle identification numbers or serial numbers, and when they do, thieves often remove the numbers; title and registration for the equipment are not mandated. Record keeping for construction equipment is often poor, making identification of recovered items difficult. Large construction equipment is used to flatten a security fence before thieves leave a storage or construction site.

Thieves typically remove all identifying numbers before reselling the items, often to unsuspecting contractors. Other equipment may be stripped down to components for separate resale on the black market. Some items stolen in the United States and the United Kingdom are sold overseas.

Thefts can occur from construction sites, by thieves posing as customers of rental companies and from equipment storage areas. Stolen construction equipment is sometimes used to commit other crimes. For example, thieves have used construction equipment to move or destroy bank ATMs.

== Scope of problem ==
According to UAE-based Al Tayyeb Used Heavy Equip. & Machines Tr. L.L.C., more than 450 items of stolen construction equipment were reported to Japan Construction Equipment Manufacturers Association in 2008 in Japan alone.

In the United States, the National Insurance Crime Bureau estimated that by 2007 more than $1 billion in construction equipment was stolen each year.

In the United Kingdom, according to the 2009 Equipment Theft Report, published by the National Plant & Equipment Register, the most commonly stolen items in that country in 2008 were trailers (911 thefts), excavators (849), site dumpers (244) and telehandlers (202). The biggest increases in thefts were in agricultural tractors (up 149 percent), quad bikes (up 83 percent), forklift trucks (up 67 percent), and portable generators (up 55 percent). TER manager Tim Purbrick said organized criminals found construction theft very lucrative.

== Anti-theft measures ==
As of 1998, the Home Depot chain of stores, which rent construction equipment, implemented two policies which dramatically reduced theft, according to the company: It stopped leaving equipment in trailers, ready for hauling away, and it used tire locks rather than chains to secure equipment in place. "When would-be thieves see that they have to load the equipment onto a trailer, which takes extra time, makes more noise and may draw attention to their actions, they decide it's not worth the trouble," Dan McAreavey, product manager for Home Depot Tool Rental for North America, told Rental Equipment Register, a business publication.

In the United Kingdom, the Construction Equipment Security And Registration (CESAR) and The National Plant & Equipment Register programs allow companies to register equipment to help recover stolen items.

In 2008, a trend was identified in the United Kingdom in which criminals rented equipment for fake sites and then vanished once the equipment was delivered. "Early indications are that CESAR registered plant is up to six times more likely to be recovered than non-CESAR registered items", according to RSA (formerly Royal Sun Alliance), a British insurance company. RSA recommended that rental businesses be sure to identify those leasing equipment and either establish credit with customers or use credit or debit cards for payment.

== See also ==
- Theft
- Motor vehicle theft
