= Transplanter =

Agricultural machine

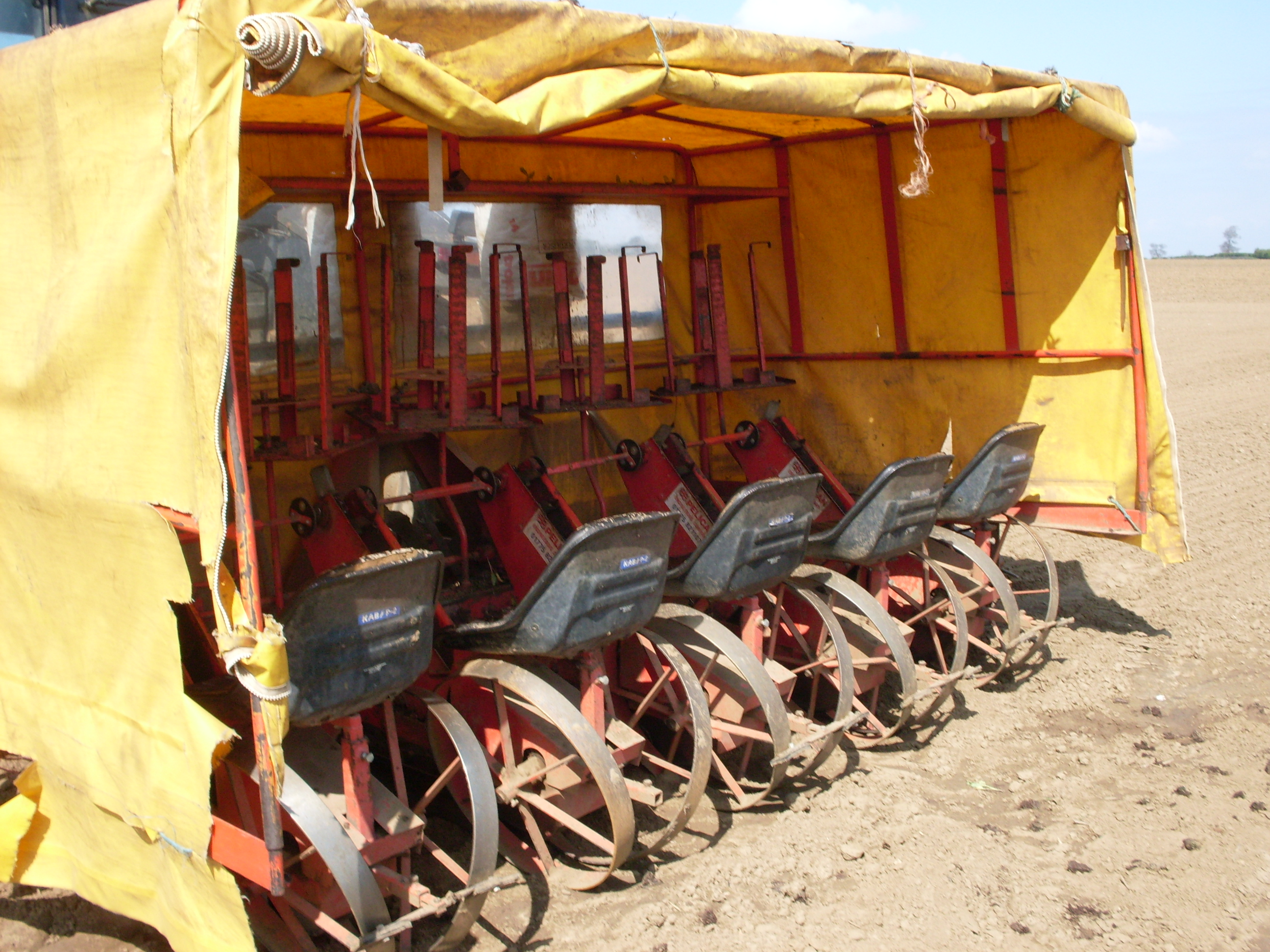
Five-row transplanter

A transplanter is an agricultural machine used for transplanting seedlings to the field. Transplanters greatly reduce time required to transplant seedlings compared to manual transplanting. Among the crops that are transplanted with transplanters are tomatoes, Chinese cabbage, cabbage, lettuce, and rice.

Semi-automatic transplanters require seedlings to be manually fed into the transplanter, which limits operating speed and operating time. They have been developed for bare-root seedlings as well as seedlings with soil. Fully automatic transplanters are faster and require less labor. However, they require seedlings to be in paper pots.

Transplanters may be self-propelled, towed on tractors, or ridden on.

== Gallery ==
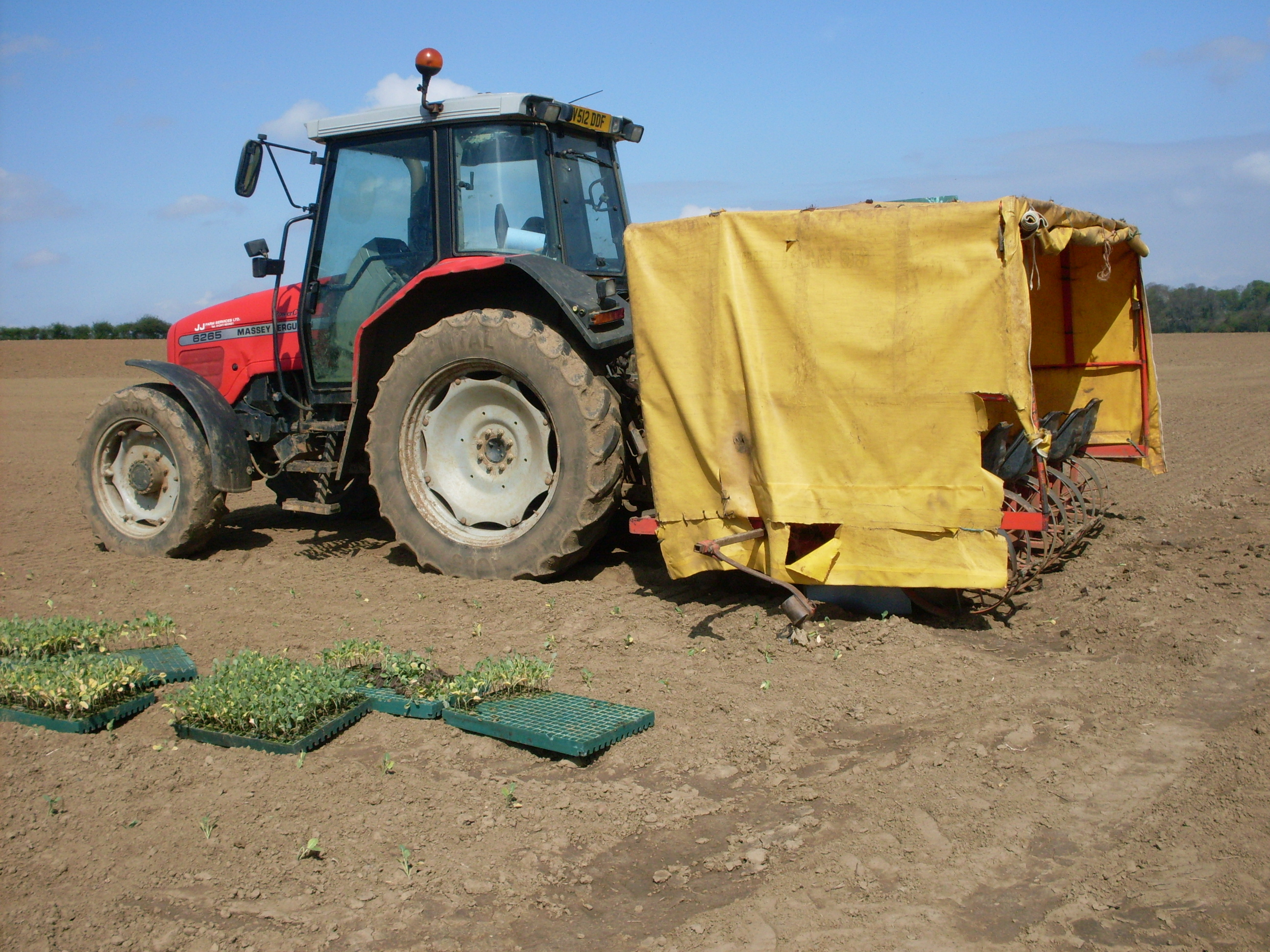
Five-row transplanter being towed by a Massey Ferguson 6265 tractor.

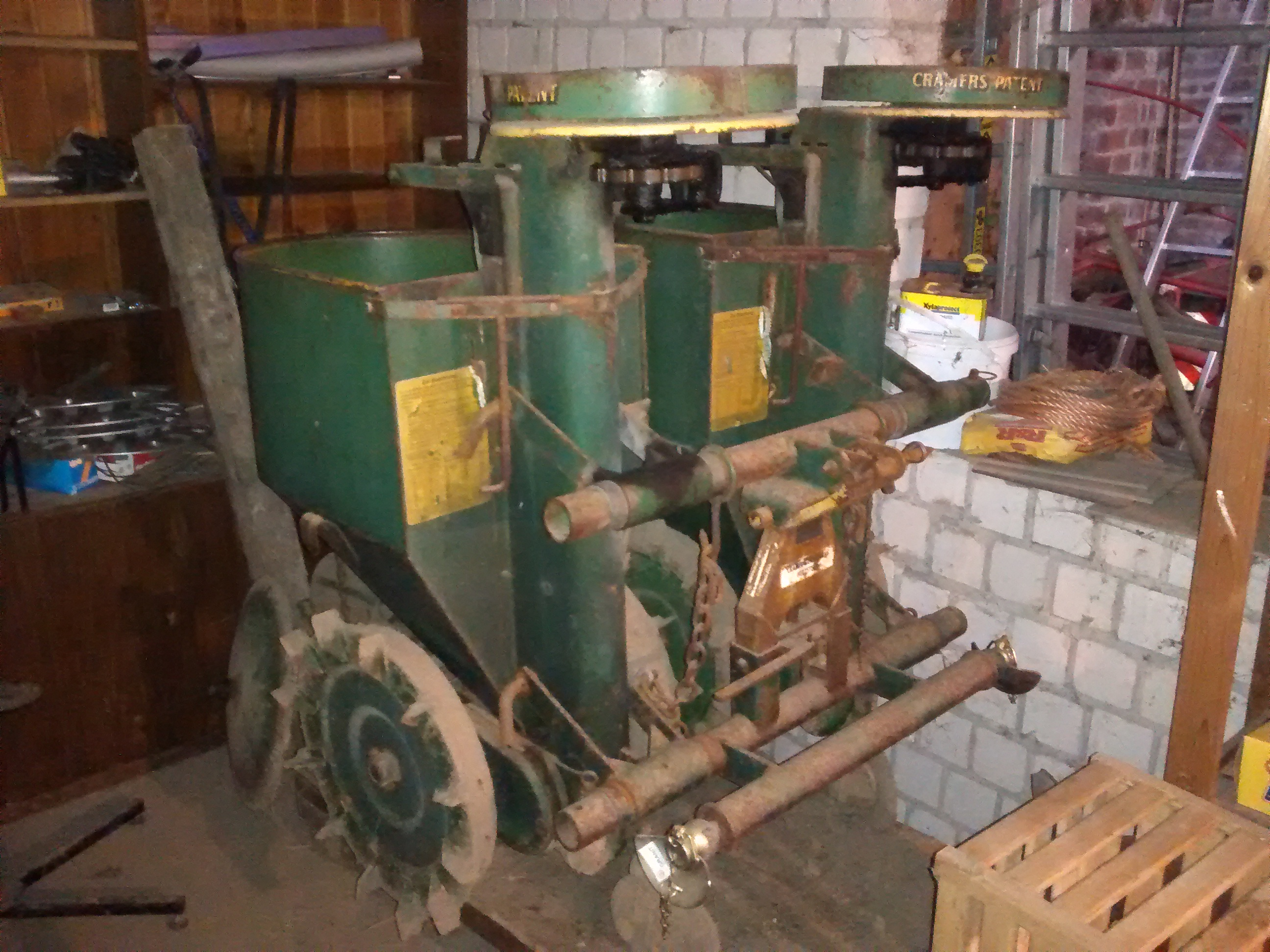
Potato transplanter.

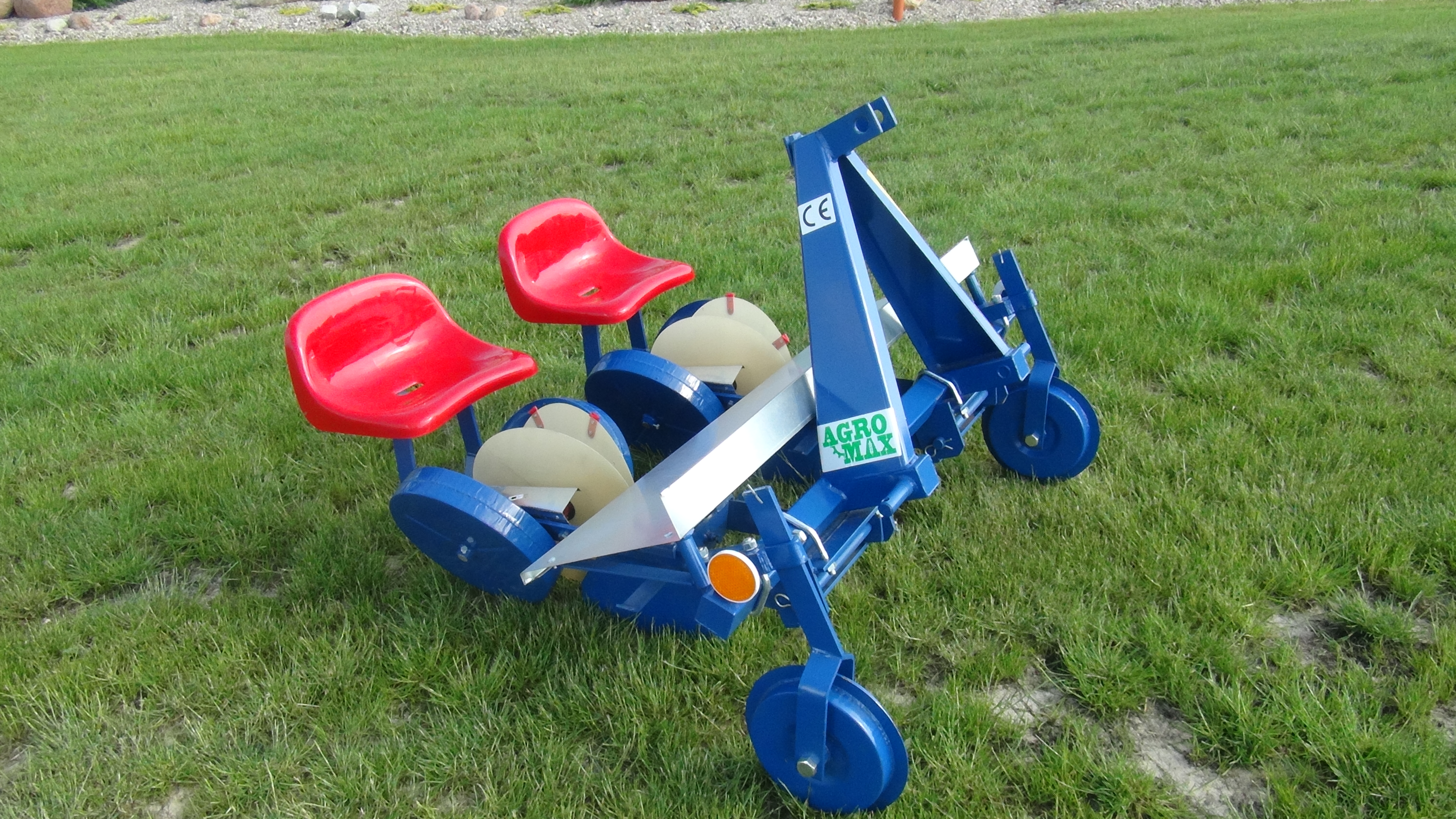
Two-row disk transplanter.

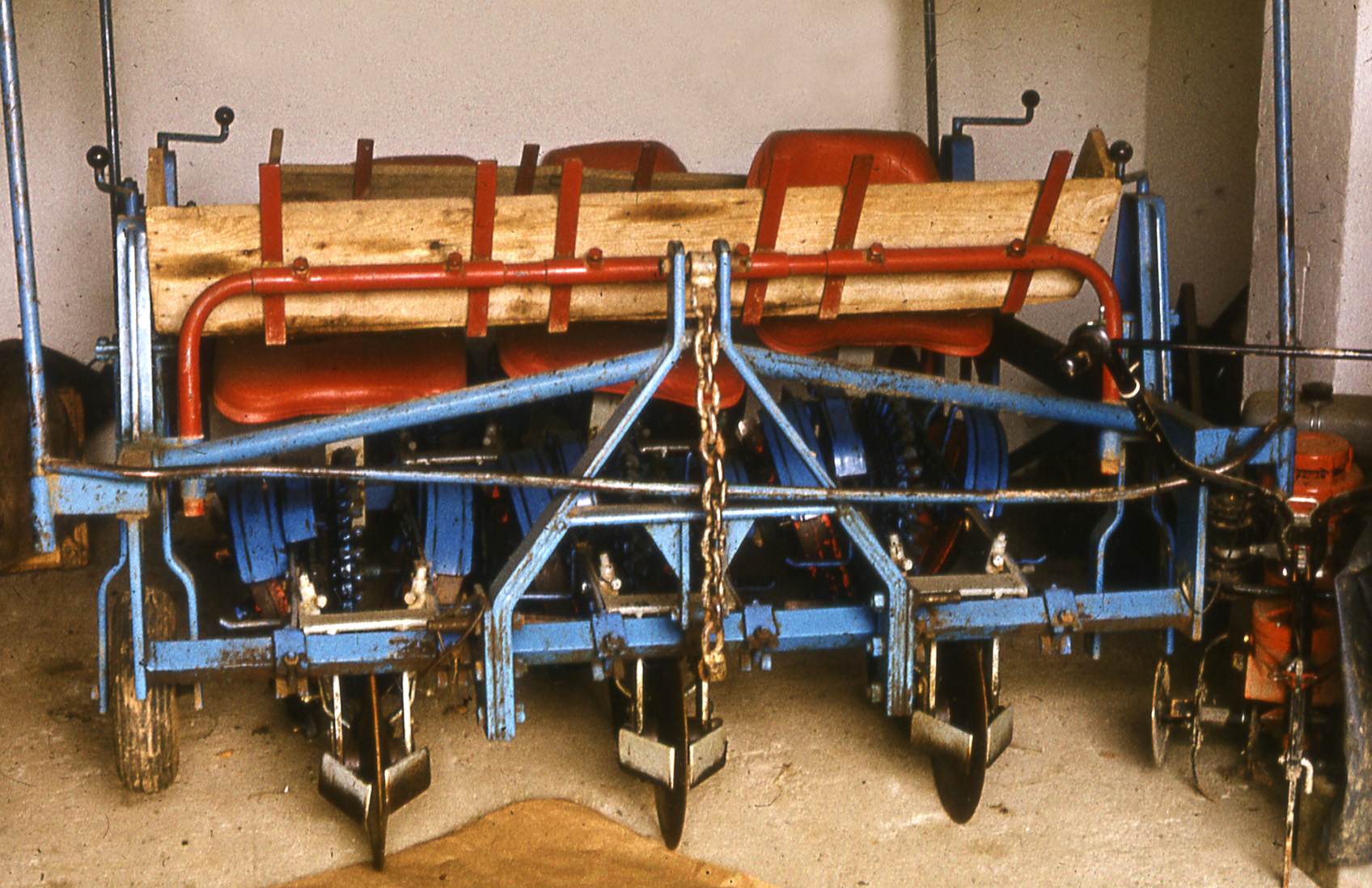
Nursery stock transplanter.

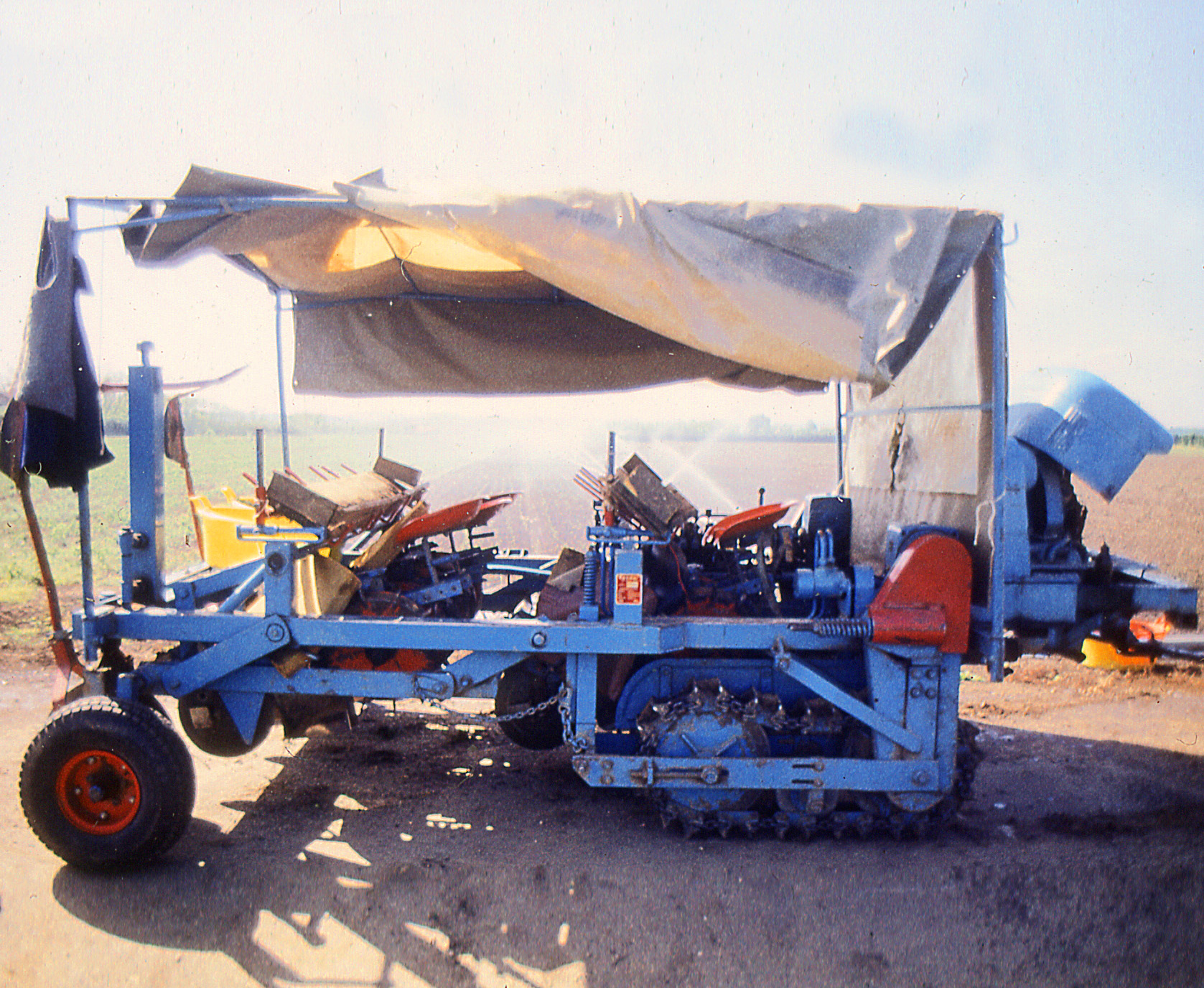
Self-propelled transplanter.

== See also ==
- Rice transplanter
