= Open Agriculture Initiative =

The MIT Open Agriculture Initiative (OpenAg) was founded in 2015 by Caleb Harper as an initiative of the MIT Media Lab at the Massachusetts Institute of Technology. The project closed in April 2020 with the departure of Harper from MIT, although the closure was only officially confirmed by MIT a month later in May. The project aimed to develop controlled-environment agriculture platforms called "Food Computers" that operated on a variety of scales, and which might have been used for experimental, educational, or personal use. All of the hardware, software, and data would have been open source, with the intention of creating a standardized open platform for agricultural research and experimentation. In theory, had the project succeeded, it would have enhanced transparency in the agricultural industry and made urban agriculture easier to perform, easing access to fresh foods.

The OpenAg project received criticism that much of its early positive publicity was based on results that were either exaggerated or outright faked. Staff members told stories of purchasing potted plants from stores and demonstrating them as if they had been grown in "Food Computers". Gizmodo called the project a "Theranos for plants" and said that few, if any, of the Food Computers successfully grew a plant. The project was also buffeted by the resignation of Joichi Ito from the MIT Media Lab, who had helped procure much of the funding for the project.

== Food Computer ==
The Open Agriculture Initiative coined the term "Food Computer" to describe their main product. Originally developed under the MIT CityFARM project, the Food Computer was a controlled-environment agriculture platform that used soilless agriculture technologies including hydroponic and aeroponic systems to grow crops indoors. The Food Computer also used an array of sensors to monitor the internal climate within a specialized growing chamber and adjust it so that the environmental conditions would remain consistent and optimum.

The climate inside of a growing chamber was supposed to be tightly controlled to enhance food production and quality. The data on the climate conditions during a given harvest cycle could be logged online as a "climate recipe", and the phenotypic expressions (observable characteristics) of the plant could also be monitored and recorded. These recipes were recorded in an online database that was to be openly accessible so that climate conditions could be downloaded by other users around the globe.

The term Food Computer was applied generally to any of the Open Agriculture Initiative's controlled-environment systems, or specifically to the smallest model, which was also called a Personal Food Computer. The tabletop-sized unit was intended for use in homes, classrooms, and small-scale experimental facilities. The mid-sized model, or Food Server, was the size of an internationally-standardized shipping container, and would utilize vertical farming structures. It was intended for use in cafeterias, restaurants, local grocers, and large-scale experimental facilities. The largest versions of the Food Computer were to be warehouse-sized Food Data Centers that would function on the level of industrial crop production.

Food Computers were never commercially available. As of 2016, there were six prototype Personal Food Computers operating in schools around the Boston area, and three Food Servers operating at MIT, Michigan State University, and Unidad Guadalajara (Cinvestav) in Mexico. Build directions and schematics were available for makers and hobbyists, while more-widespread availability was expected once manufacturing began.

== Open Phenome Library ==
Various climate conditions including temperature, relative humidity, carbon dioxide and oxygen levels, pH of water, electrical conductivity of water, and exposure to various nutrients, fertilizers, and chemicals influence whether a plant grows and also how it grows. Different climate conditions can lead to different phenotypic expressions in plants that are genotypically very similar or identical. The various traits that a plant expresses, including color, size, texture, yield, growth rate, flavor, and nutrient density, make up its phenome. OpenAg aimed to crowd source related research, and to create an open library of phenome data that relates external climate conditions to specific phenotypic expressions in various plants.

== Affiliations and funding ==
The Open Agriculture Initiative was primarily funded through the MIT Media Lab, which was almost 100% industrially funded through corporate memberships. The Open Agriculture Initiative had also received specific endorsements from members such as IDEO, Lee Kum Kee, Target, Unilever, and Welspun. OpenAg also received additional investments and philanthropic contributions from companies and institutions unaffiliated with the Media Lab.

== Criticism ==
=== Allegations of scientific misconduct ===
In September 2019, former employees at Fenome, the startup spun off from OpenAg, openly discussed the failure of their Food Computers to maintain the controlled environment required for growing food. They alleged that photographic results and growth data had been falsified for presentations to investors and the general public. A series of internal emails sent by Babak Babakinejad, the former lead scientist of the project, backed up these allegations.

Further investigations in November showed that the Food Computers which principal investigator Harper claimed had been sent to a refugee camp for Syrian refugees in Azraq had instead been sent to a World Food Programme office in Amman, where they failed to grow food.

=== Environmental concerns ===
In September 2019, Boston radio station WBUR published a report detailing charges that the OpenAg initiative lab at MIT's Bates Research and Engineering Center in Middleton had been dumping nitrogen-laden hydroponics solution into the wastewater system at levels above the state's mandated limits of 10 ppm, leading to an investigation by the Department of Environmental Protection (MassDEP).

MIT was assessed a fine of $25,125 for this violation. MIT agreed to pay $15,000 and to close a wastewater injection well, and to prepare a wastewater management plan for MassDEP approval.
