= Goldoni (company) =

Goldoni Keestrack srl
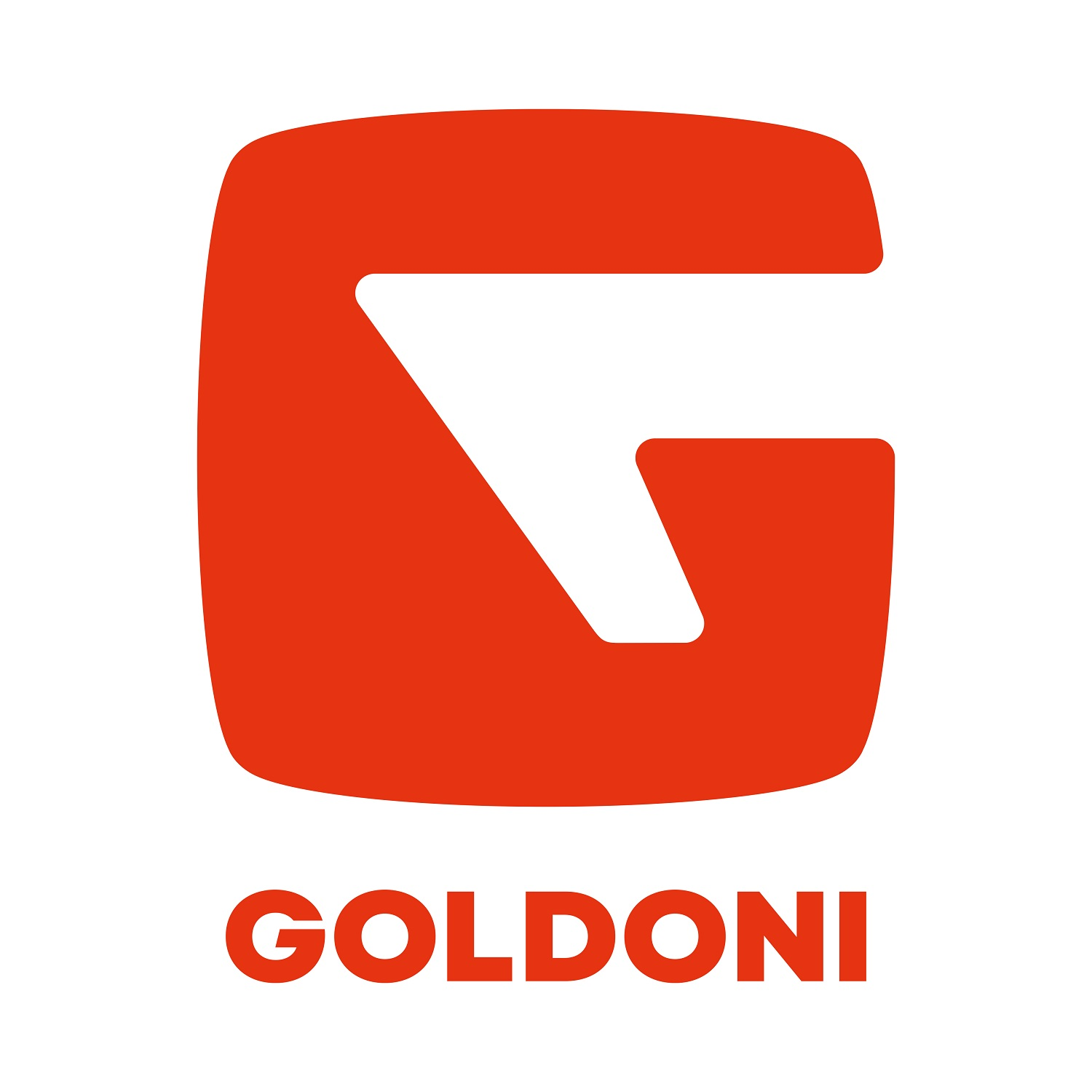
- Company type: Public company
- Industry: Agricultural machinery
- Founded: 1926
- Founder: Celestino Goldoni
- Headquarters: Carpi, Emilia-Romagna, Modena, Italy
- Products: Tractors specialized Equal size wheel tractors Tractors with loading platform Motorized cultivators
- Owner: Keestrack groups
- Website: www.goldoni.com

Goldoni S.p.A. is an Italian agricultural machinery manufacturer. The company was founded by Celestino Goldoni in Migliarina, Modena, Italy in 1926. The company designs and builds specialized tractors, equal size wheel tractors, tractors with loading platform and motorized cultivators.

== History ==
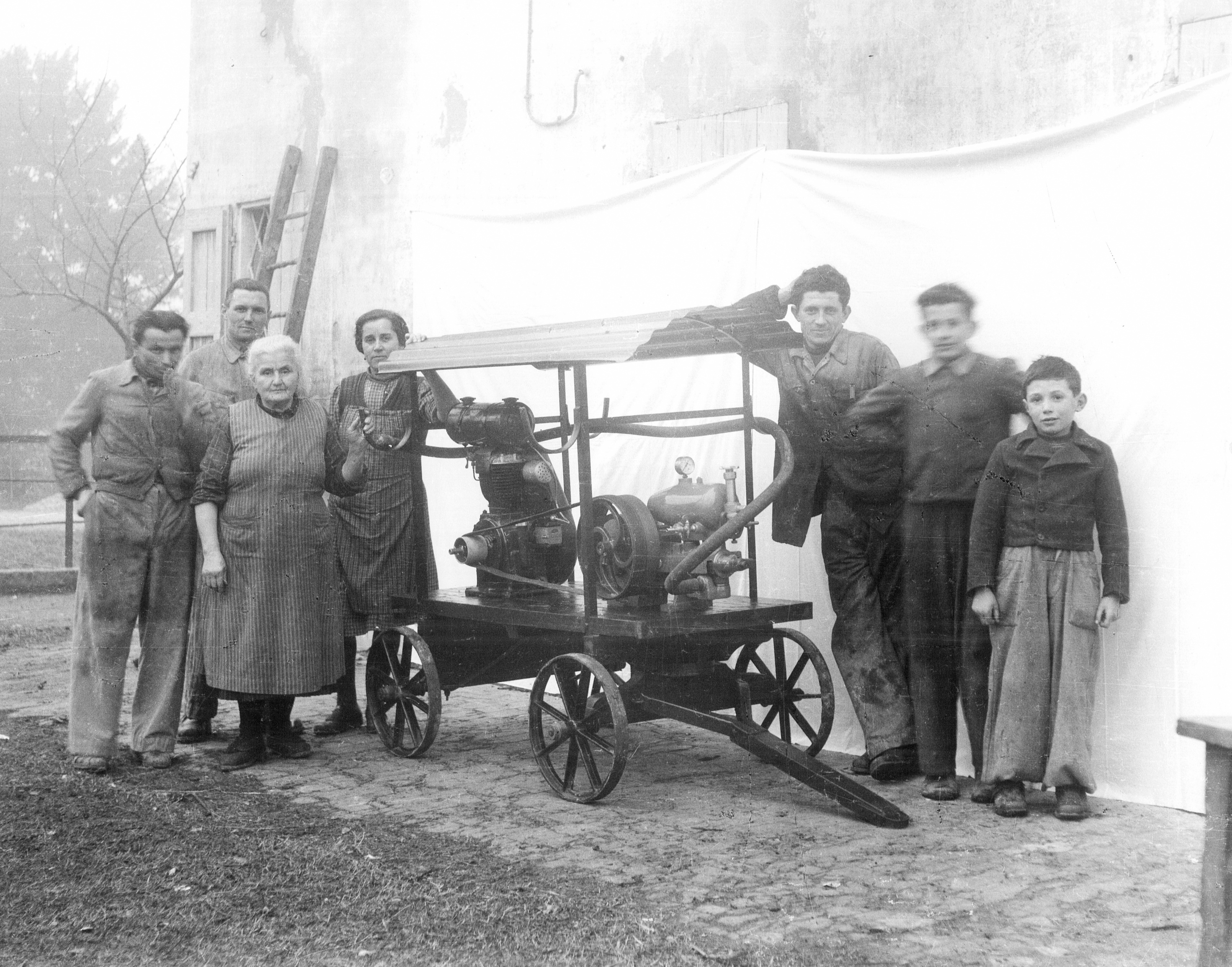
Goldoni's family - 1948

In 1926 Celestino Goldoni founded "Goldoni Agricultural Machinery" in a farmhouse in the countryside of Modena, beginning the production of irrigation's pumps.

In 1950, the company added motocultivators and motomowers, which is sold through an exclusive commercial with the Federconsorzi through its net in Italy.

In 1967, the first tractors were produced, with the series "Export", followed by the series "Universal" and the company expanded abroad through a series of trade agreements.

In 1969 Goldoni came to an agreement with Cuba for the sale of 1500 tractors (GM4 and "Export") for the fields of sugar cane; in 1978 was inaugurated the branch "Goldoni France"; in 1980 with Tbilisi (Georgia, soon Soviet Union ) for on-site production and marketing of products "Goldoni 700" and "Cultivator Super 600".

In 1982 it introduced the "Compact" tractors, designed to work in orchards and vineyards; in 1984-1985 it granted to the Republic of China the license for on-site production and marketing of "Transporter", "Goldoni 800", " Universal "and" RS 900"; in 1986 with John Deere to produce the names and colors of John Deere of orchard and vineyard tractors and Iran for on-site production and marketing of" Universal "and" 900 RS "and motormowers. At the beginning of the nineties, Goldoni began the production of tracked specialized and 2002 introduced the series "Star Quadrifoglio", still a specialized tractor for orchards and vineyards. In 2004 it inaugurated the new department "research and development" and in 2008 presented the "Boxter", which won the "Technical Innovation" at the EIMA International.

In March 2021 Keestrack, a major manufacturer in mining, recycling and construction equipment, acquired Goldoni.

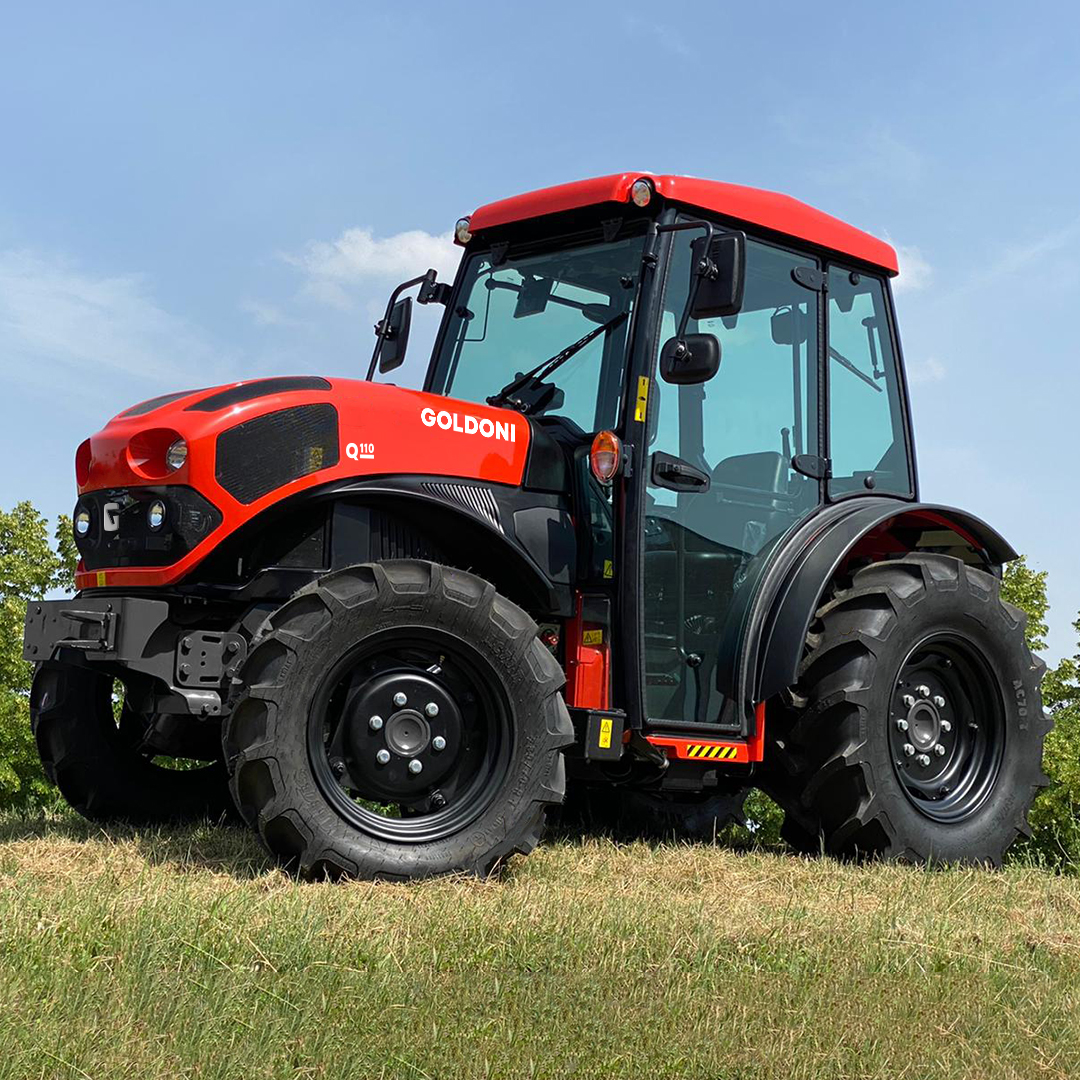

== Factory ==
The factory of Migliarina di Carpi near Modena occupies an area of over 130,000 m^{2} (of which 65,000 are covered).

== Products ==
The products include:

- Specialized tractors
- Equal size wheel tractors
- Tractors with loading platform
- Motorized cultivators

== Branches ==
Branch subsidiaries in France. Over to the European Community, the main foreign markets are the countries of the Mediterranean and the Middle East, South America and North America, and Oceania, bringing the export in more than 80 countries.
