= TYM (company) =

South Korean agricultural company

TYM CORPORATION
- Native name: 주식회사 티와이엠
- Company type: Public
- Traded as: KRX: 002900
- Industry: Agricultural machinery
- Founded: September 28, 1951; 74 years ago
- Headquarters: Seoul, South Korea
- Area served: Worldwide
- Key people: Kim Hee-Yong; Chairman & CEO
- Products: Tractors; Combine harvesters Cultivators; Rice transplanters Diesel engines
- Revenue: KRW 713.3 billion (FY 2020) (US$ 655 million) (Note: Exchange rate at 31/12/2020 : 1,088 KRW per USD)
- Website: https://tym.world/

TYM CORPORATION (Korean: 주식회사 티와이엠) is a South Korean agricultural machinery manufacturing company headquartered in Seoul, South Korea with operations in more than 40 countries. The company began in 1951, founded in Busan, South Korea, as the Tong Yang Moolsan and was renamed "TYM" in 2020. TYM designs, produces, and sells tractors, combines, cultivators, rice transplanters and diesel engines.

== History ==
In 1968 it merged with Korea Light Metal and commenced agricultural Machinery production. In 1973 Anyang Farm Machinery Factory established; company shares opened to the public. TYM's Research and Development Institute and Agricultural Machinery Training Institute were established in 1993.

TYM entered the US tractor market in 2004 and acquired Kukje (Branson) in 2016. Kukje Machinery and its Branson line would put TYM ahead of current number two LS Mtron among South Korean agricultural equipment players, and close to Daedong Co., the manufacturer of Kioti tractors and all-terrain utility vehicles.

== Products ==
- Tractors
- Attachments
- Cultivators
- Rice transplanters
- Combine harvesters
- Engines

== Brands ==
- Branson
- Kukje Machinery (KM)
- TYM
