= Lindner (agricultural machinery manufacturer) =

Agricultural machinery manufacturer based in Kundl, Austria

Traktorenwerk Lindner GmbH
- Company type: GmbH
- Industry: Agricultural machinery
- Founded: 1948
- Founder: Hermann Lindner
- Headquarters: Kundl, Kufstein District, Tirol, Austria
- Products: Tractors; All-terrain transporters
- Number of employees: 220
- Website: Official website

Lindner Traktorenwerk GmbH is an Austrian agricultural machinery manufacturer. Lindner is a family company based in Kundl, Austria that has produced tractors and transporters for mountain and grassland management and for forestry and municipal applications since 1948. The company was the first manufacturer of a four-wheel-drive tractor in Austria.

== History ==
Lindner Logo

Hermann Lindner was born on 5 November 1905 in Neustift im Stubaital. He founded the company in 1946 initially to produce gang saws, but in 1948 exhibited his first tractor, the S 14, at the Vienna Autumn Fair. Lindner constructed more tractor models with different engines and special equipment and in 1953, the company introduced the first Austrian tractor with four-wheel drive.

In 1956 a new production hall was built, employing over 150 people. Every month, around 70 tractors left the factory in Kundl, mainly for Austrian customers, but also for export to Spain, France and Italy. On 19 October 1957 Hermann Lindner died in hospital in Wörgl from the effects of a serious car accident, but the company continued to thrive under the direction of his wife Stephanie, and his children Hermann Lindner, Loisi Sappl and Rudolf Lindner.

== Models ==
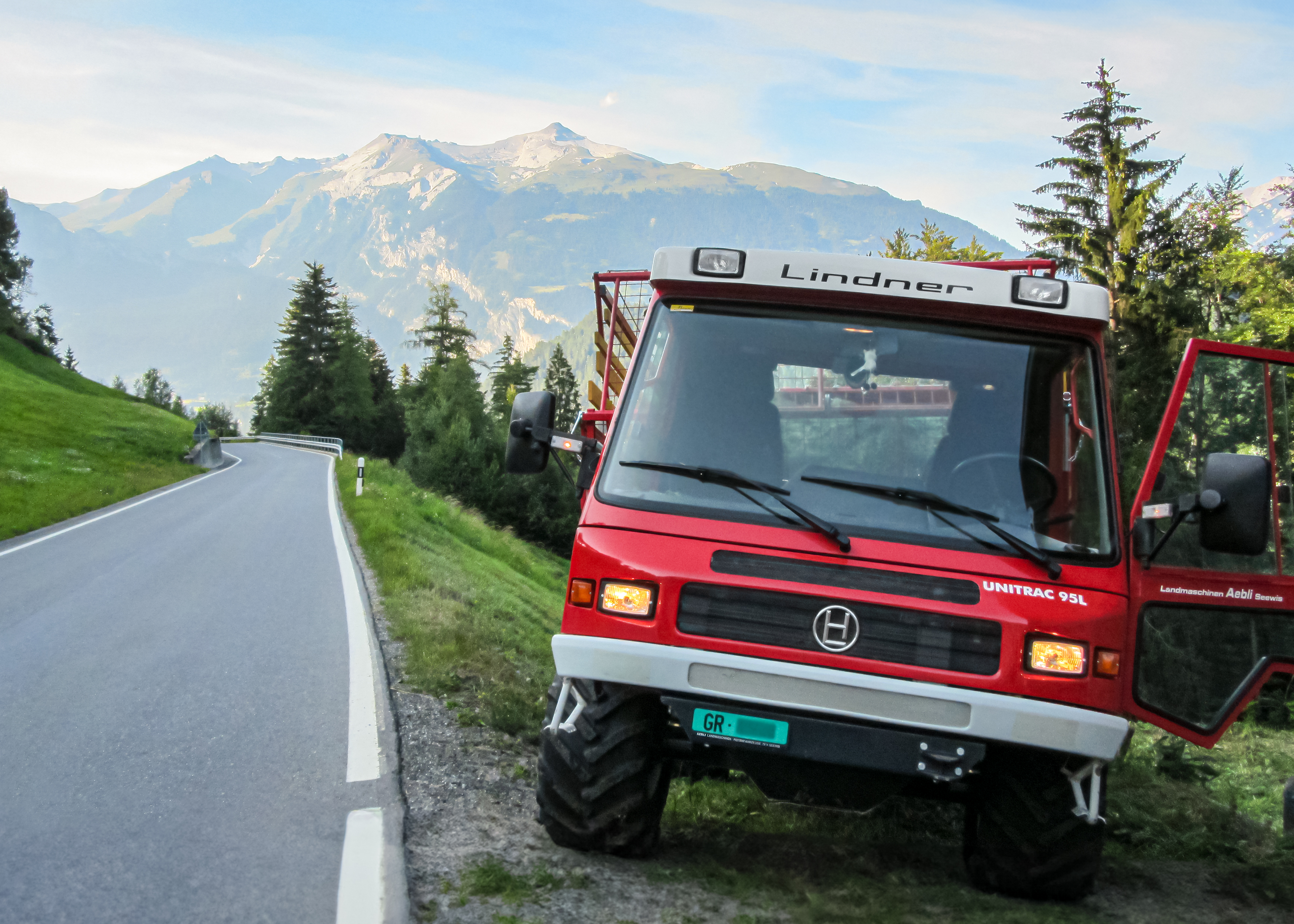
Lindner Unitrac 95L truck in Versam, Switzerland

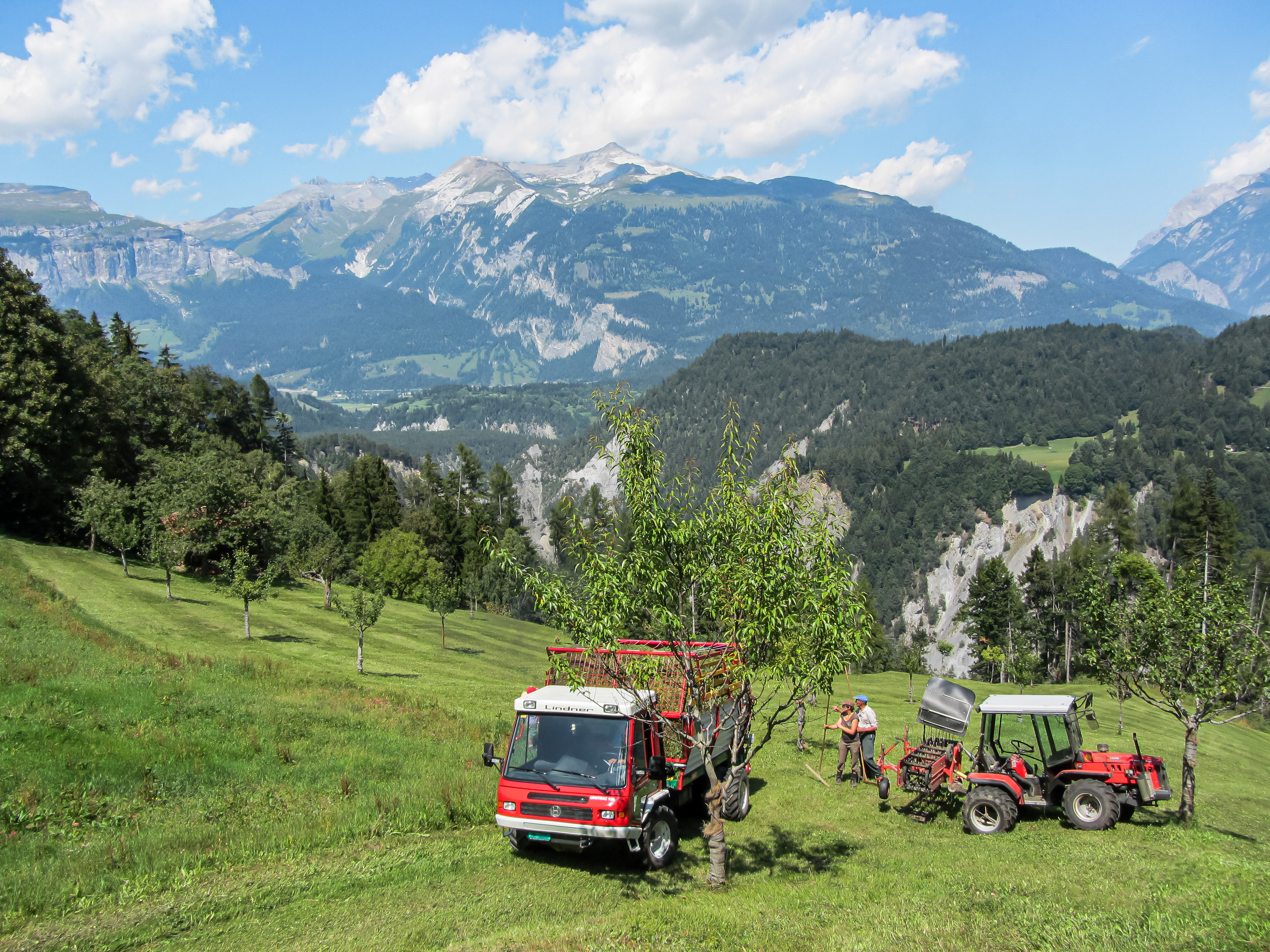
Lindner truck and tractor harvesting hay in Swiss Alps

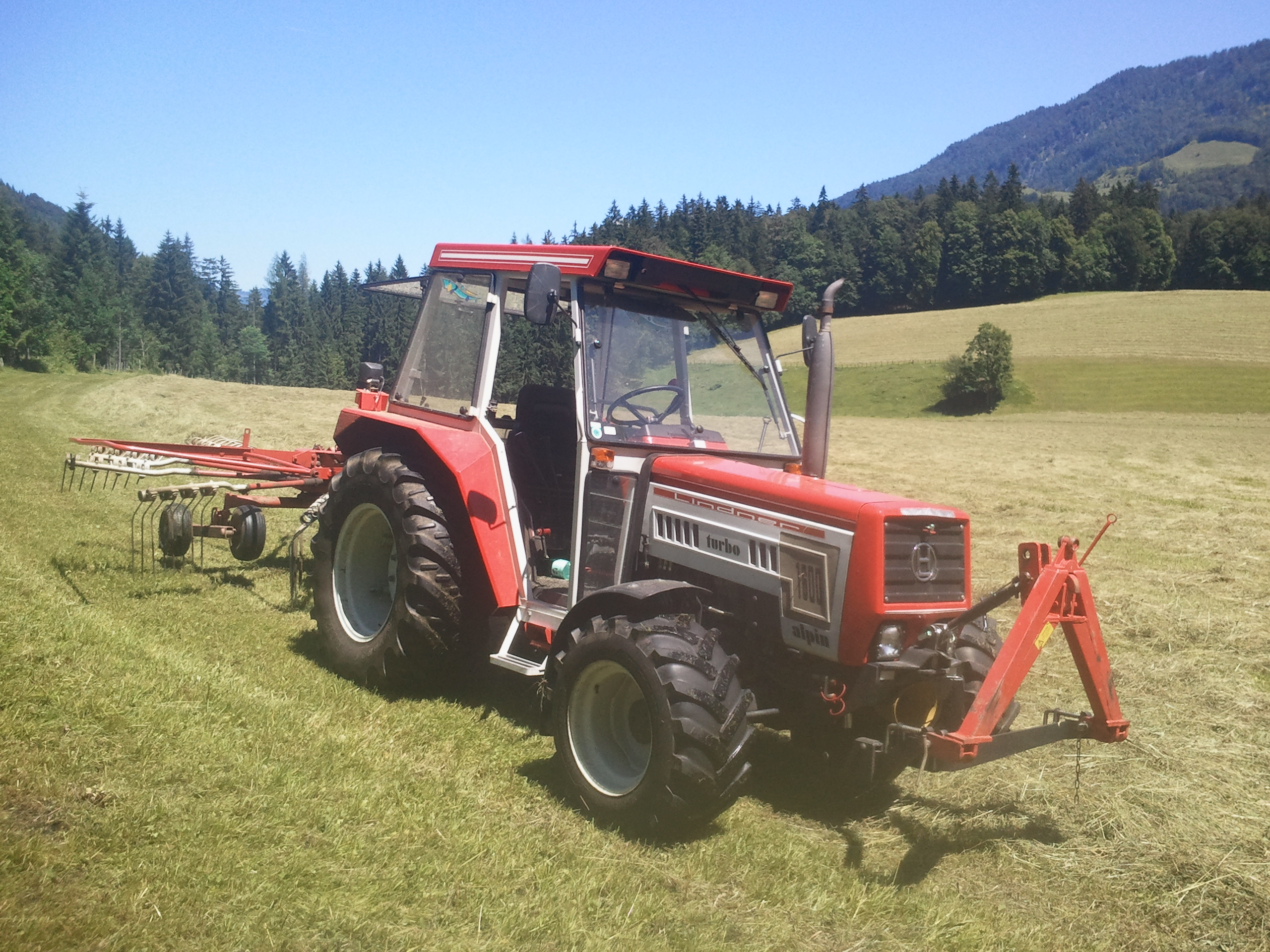
Lindner 1600 Alpin Turbo

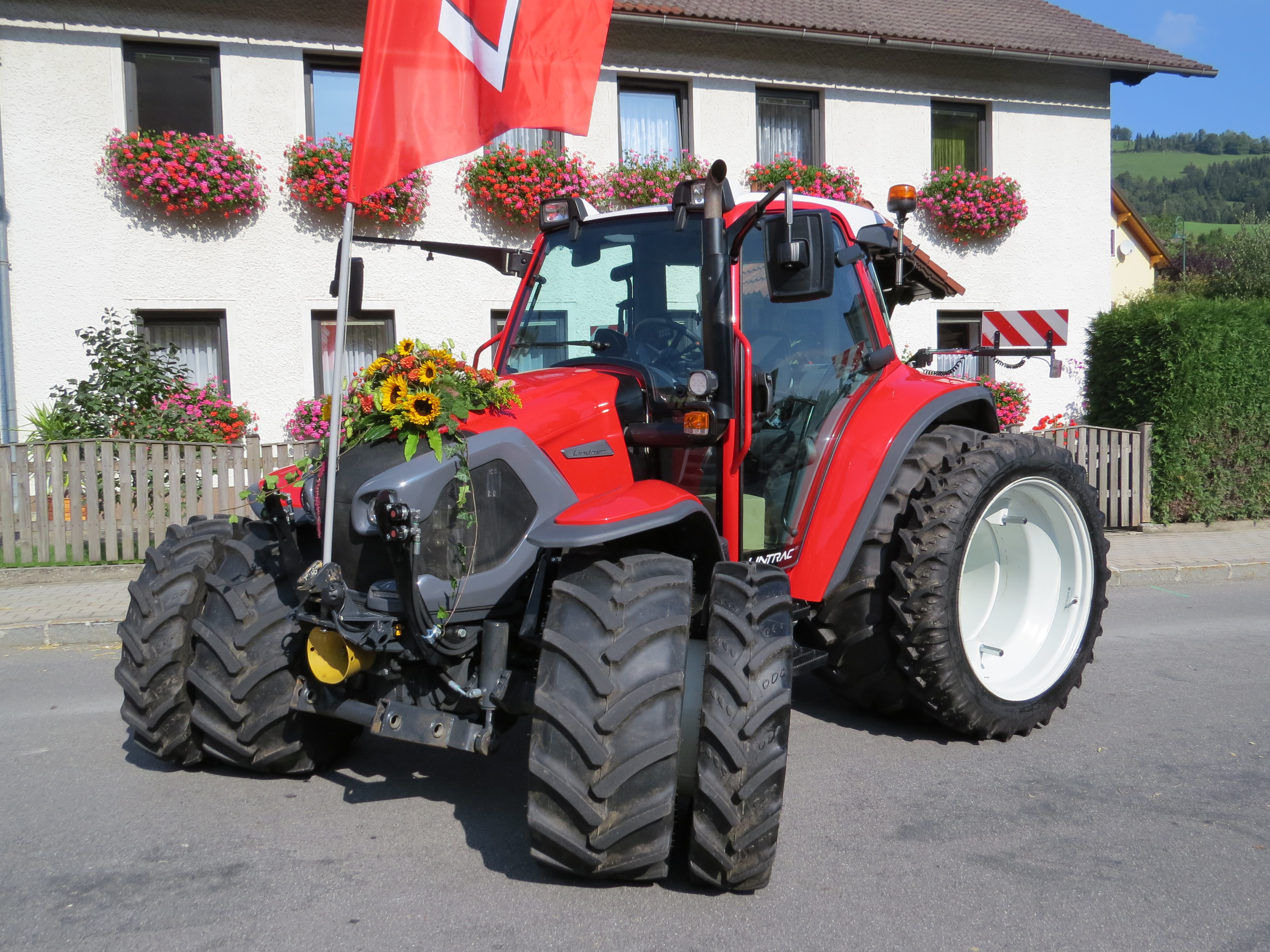
Lindner Lintrac at Dirndlkirtag in Frankenfels, Austria (2017)

The first Lindner tractor, the S 14, was produced between 1948 and 1950. Powered by a 14 hp (10 kW) 1330 cc engine, it was joined by a range of more powerful tractors, the 15 hp (11 kW) JW 15 (1949), the 20 hp (15 kW) JW 20 (1950) and 40 hp (30 kW) JW 35 (1953). The Bauernfreund (BF) brand was introduced in 1953, and would be produced until 1985.

The BF 250, 320 and 450 were introduced in 1967 with 3-cylinder Perkins water-cooled engines and the A-210 ZF power train. The first transporter (Muli) T 3500 followed a year later. In 1969 a special mountain tractor with small dual tire was developed.

In January 1985, the BF series was replaced by a completely new tractor generation. In June, all of production was turned towards the new series, and all previously built models were superseded by new models, the Lindner 1450, 1500, 1600, 1650 and 1700 with Steyr gearbox, Perkins diesel engines, all available with four-wheel drive.

1996 saw the launch of the Geotrac 50, 60, 70 and 80. In 1999 the larger Geotracs 100 was introduced with 98 hp (73 kW). By 2005, around 10,000 units had been produced. In 2001 the Geotrac 60, 70 and 80 were replaced by the new models Geotrac 65, 75 and 85, and in 2002 the Geotrac 83 and 93 with a new ZF-powershift appeared. The Geotrac 73 A designed with a high torque motor and low center of gravity for extreme ( "Alpine") ratios followed in 2003.

The 10,000th Geotrac and 1,000th Unitrac left the plant in 2005. 2007 Geotrac series 4 was introduced (106 to 126 hp (79 to 94 kW)). In 2009 the company launched the first model of the GEOTRAC Series 4 Alpin, the Geotrac 94. The following year, the Series 4 Alpin was expanded with the Geotrac 64, 74 and 84.

In 2015, the Lindner Lintrac, the first tractor with a continuously variable transmission, was put on the market.

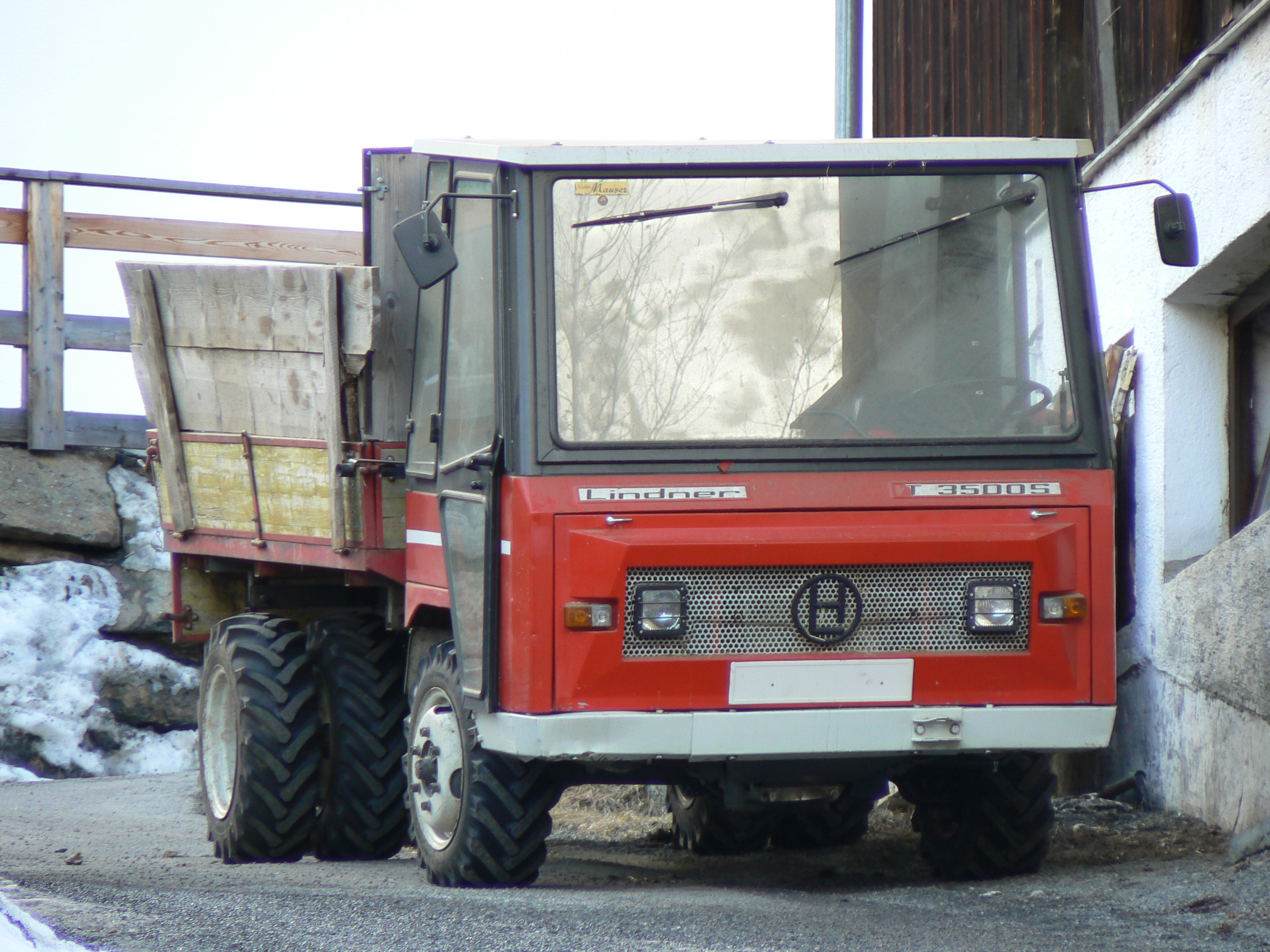
Lindner Transporter T 3500S

== Environmental activity ==
Lindner was the first company in Austria to receive a low energy certificate for a company building, in 2010.

The 2,000 square metres (22,000 sq ft) Innovation Centre, opened in 2014, uses triple glazing and energy-saving components such as LED lighting enable the building to achieve standards which almost compare to a passive house and is powered by a photovoltaic solar array.

== Lindner today ==
Lindner is still 100% owned by the family and based in Kundl. Revenue in 2015 was €74 million, with annual production running to about 1500 vehicles. It is third in the tractor market in Austria after Steyr Tractor and New Holland with has a market share of 13%, while Austria's three best selling tractors in 2015 were the Geotracs 74, 64 and 84, all of which were produced in Kundl. Exports are about 52% of production, primarily to Germany, Switzerland, Italy, France, Slovenia, Netherlands and Norway.
