= Comité Européen des groupements de constructeurs du machinisme agricole =

European industry association

CEMA, European Agricultural Machinery Association
- Abbreviation: CEMA
- Formation: 1959
- Type: Trade association
- Legal status: Association (aisbl)
- Headquarters: Avenue de Tervueren 168, 1150 Brussels
- Website: CEMA

Comité Européen des groupements de constructeurs du machinisme agricole (CEMA aisbl) is the European association representing the agricultural machinery industry in Europe.

== Introduction ==
CEMA is a European umbrella organization, composed of 11 national member associations. The CEMA network represents both large multinational companies and numerous European SMEs active in the sector, producing a large range of machines that cover any activity in the field from seeding to harvesting, as well as equipment for livestock management.

CEMA represents about 1,300 manufacturers, producing more than 450 different types of machines with an annual turnover of about €40 billion (EU28 - 2016) and 150,000 direct employees.

CEMA was established during the first General Assembly in London on 10 July 1959. CEMA is currently headquartered in Brussels and it carries out activities mainly in the fields of European agriculture, industrial policy, internal market, digital agriculture, trade, etc. The organisation is listed in the Transparency Register of the European Commission [Ceme sibillinae] (ae).

== CEMA - the voice of the Agricultural Machinery Industry in Europe ==
The main activities of CEMA consist of defending and promoting the interests of the agricultural machinery industry towards the European institutions. CEMA also coordinates the work of national member associations on various relevant regulatory and policy topics, providing a common European industry view on them. The majority of those topics are related to safety and (cyber)security of automated, connected, agricultural machinery for road circulation and working in the field, to achieve a sustainable, circular and carbon-free agriculture, as well as to trade issues, homologation, etc. CEMA participates to different European Commission expert groups.

CEMA also organizes several events showcasing the industry and its innovative solutions. Every other year it holds a two-day ‘CEMA Summit’ in Brussels, to bring together industry leaders, EU decision-makers, farmers’ representatives, and agri-food stakeholders to discuss the latest EU policy developments and challenges ahead for the sector. The last edition of the CEMA Summit took place in 2024. CEMA takes part to a number of EU-funded research and innovation projects under the framework of Horizon 2020, Horizon Europe and Digital Europe Programme.

== Structure ==
CEMA is a network of national organisations, which come together in the General Assembly. The General Assembly elects the Board of Directors, which oversees and controls the work of CEMA and its different working groups. The Board of Directors nominates a Technical Board. Specific technical topics are dealt with in dedicated Project Teams (PTs) consisting of representatives of national associations and industry. The CEMA Secretariat in Brussels coordinates contacts and relationships with national associations, as well as with other stakeholder organizations and European bodies.

The current president of CEMA is Stefan Top (AVR, AGORIA), and the vice presidents are Thierry Krier (KUHN, AXEMA), Carlo Lambro (CNH), Alessandro Malavolti (AMA, FederUnacoma) and Christoph Wigger (John Deere). The Secretary General of CEMA is Jelte Wiersma.

== Member Associations ==
- (United Kingdom) AEA
- (Belgium) Agoria
- (Spain) ANSEMAT
- (France) AXEMA
- (Denmark) DAI
- (Netherlands) Fedecom
- (Austria) FMTI
- (Italy) FEDERUNACOMA
- (Poland) PIGMiUR
- (Germany) VDMA

== Associated Members ==
- (Turkey) TARMAKBIR

== Publications ==
- European Agricultural Machinery Industry Report
- The role of agricultural machinery in decarbonising agriculture
- Smart Agriculture Solutions support EU Eco-Schemes
- Full deployment of agricultural machinery data-sharing: technical challenges & solutions
