= Japan Construction Equipment Manufacturers Association =

- Abbreviation: CEMA
- Founded: 1990; 36 years ago
- Type: Trade association
- Purpose: "Contributing to society through harmony and progress"
- Headquarters: Shiba Koen, Minato-ku, Tokyo 105-0011
- Coordinates: 35.659682°N 139.745293°E
- Region served: Japan
- Official language: Japanese
- Chairman: Tetsuji Ohashi
- Website: www.cema.or.jp/

The Japan Construction Equipment Manufacturers Association (一般社団法人 日本建設機械工業会, Ippan Shadanhōjin Nihon Kensetsu Kikai Kōgyō-kai), or CEMA, is a trade association which represents construction equipment manufacturers in Japan. The association often responds to inquiries from media and researchers on the state of the manufacturing business environment in Japan.

== Founding ==
The association was formed in a time when the industry was in a massive price war. The future members of the association realized that if the war went on no one would make a profit and the companies would hurt each other. Once the industry formed its group, every company felt secure again.
