= Rice transplanter =

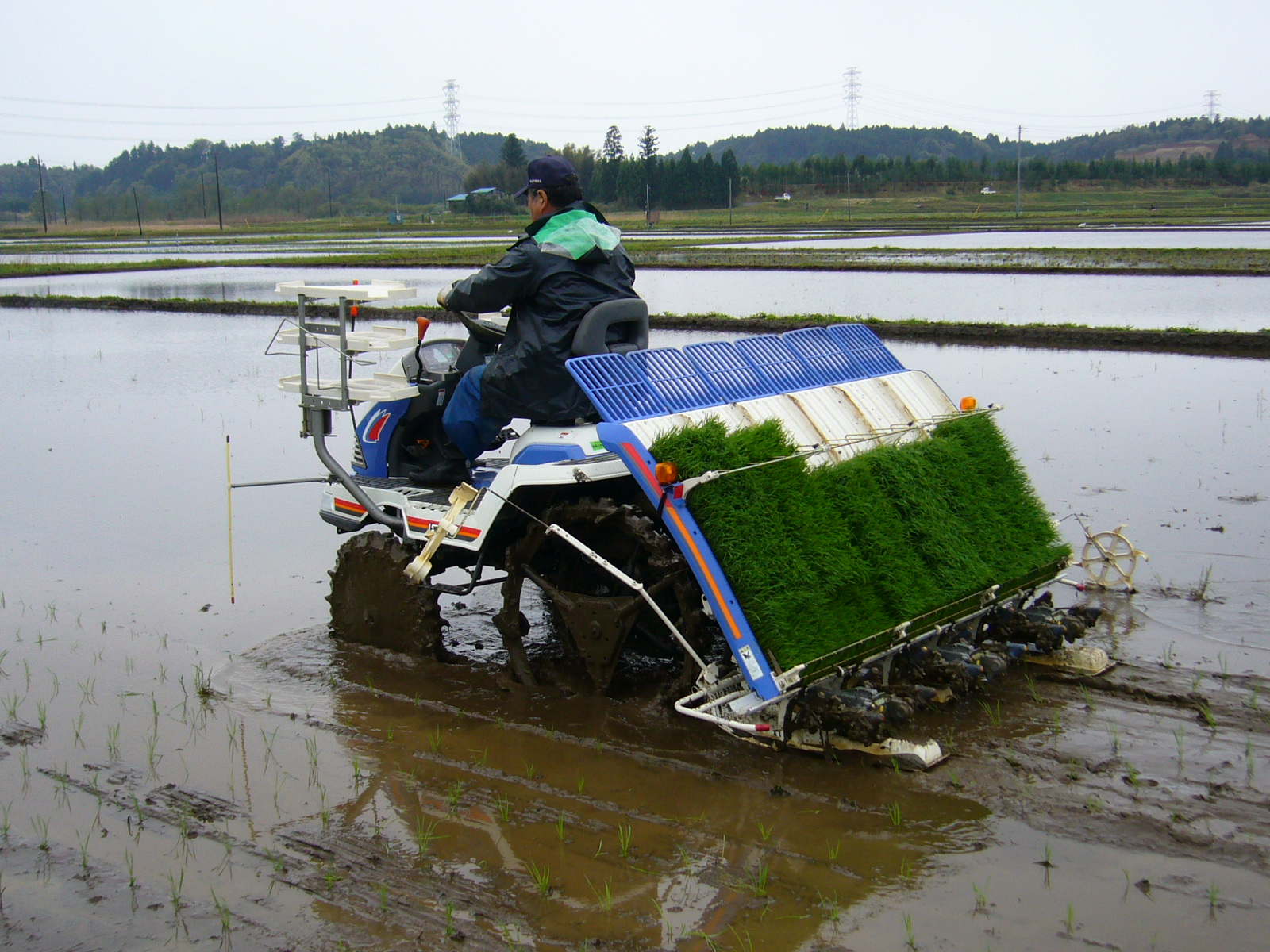
A riding-type rice transplanter in Japan

A rice transplanter is a specialized transplanter fitted to transplant rice seedlings onto paddy fields. The two main types of rice transplanter are the riding type and walking type. The riding type is power-driven and can usually transplant six lines in one pass; the walking type is manually driven and can usually transplant four lines in one pass.

Although rice is grown in areas other than Asia, rice transplanters are used mainly in East, Southeast, and South Asia. This is because rice can be grown without transplanting, by simply sowing seeds on field, and farmers outside Asia prefer this fuss-free way at the expense of reduced yield.

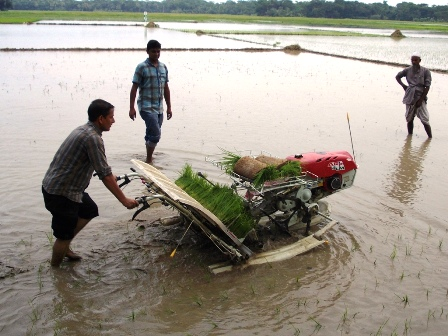
A Korean walking-type rice transplanter

A common rice transplanter comprises:

- a seedling tray like a shed roof on which a mat-type rice nursery is set;
- a seedling tray shifter that shifts the seedling tray like a typewriter carriage; and
- plural pickup forks that pick up a seedling from a mat-type nursery on the seedling tray and put the seedling into the earth, as if the seedling were taken between one's fingers.

Rice transplanter in use in rural Kanagawa, 2023

Machine transplanting using rice transplanters requires considerably less time and labour than manual transplanting. It increases the approximate area that a person can plant from 700 to 10,000 square metres per day.

However, rice transplanters are considerably expensive for almost all Asian small-hold farmers. Rice transplanters are popular in industrialized countries where labor cost is high, for example in South Korea. They are now also becoming more popular in South Asian countries because, at transplanting time, labor shortage is at peak levels.

Rice transplanters were first developed in Japan in the 1960s, whereas the earliest attempt to mechanize rice transplanting dates back to late 19th century. In Japan, development and spread of rice transplanters progressed rapidly during the 1970s and 1980s.
