= List of tractor manufacturers =

The following companies and organisations currently manufacture tractors.

== A ==
- Ace (India)
- AGCO Corporation (United States)
  - Fendt (Germany)
  - Massey Ferguson (US)
  - Valtra (Finland)
- Agrale (Brazil)
- Agri-King (India)
- Agrinar (Argentina)
- Al-Ghazi Tractors (Pakistan)(licensed New Holland)
  - Fiat Trattori
- Antonio Carraro (Italy)
- ARGO SpA (Italy)
  - Landini
  - McCormick Tractors
  - Valpadana

== B ==
- Basak Traktor (Turkey)
  - Versatile
- BCS Agri (Italy)BCS homepage
  - Ferrari Tractors
  - Pasquali
- Belarus (Belarus) (MTZ)
- Blue White Robotics (Israel)

== C ==
- Carraro Agritalia (Italy)
- Case IH (US)(part of CNH Industrial N.V.)
- Chalion (China)
- Chelyabinsk Tractor Plant (Russia)
  - ChTZ
- Claas (Germany)
- CNH Industrial N.V. (UK)
  - Case IH (US)
  - New Holland (Italy/US)
  - Steyr (Austria)

== D ==
- Daedong (South Korea)
  - Kioti
- Deere & Company (US)
  - John Deere
- Deutz-Fahr (Germany) (part of SDF)

== E ==
- Escorts-Kubota (India)
  - Escorts-Kubota
  - Farmtrac
  - Powertrac
- ETRAG (Algeria)

== F ==
- Fendt (Germany) (part of AGCO)
- Ferrari Tractors (Italy) (part of BCS Agri)

== G ==
- Ganja Auto Plant (Azerbaijan)
- Goldoni (Italy)

== H ==
- Harbin (China)
  - Harbin SongJiang
- Hattat (Turkey)
- Hürlimann - (Swiss) (part of SDF)

== I ==
- IMT (Serbia) (part of TAFE
- Indo Farm (India)

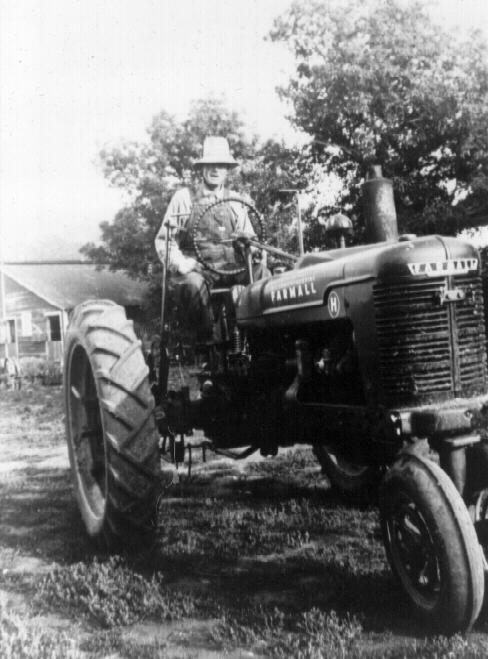
International Harvester

- Iseki (Japan)
- ITE (Israel)

== J ==
- JCB (England)
- Jinma (China)
- John Deere (US)

== K ==
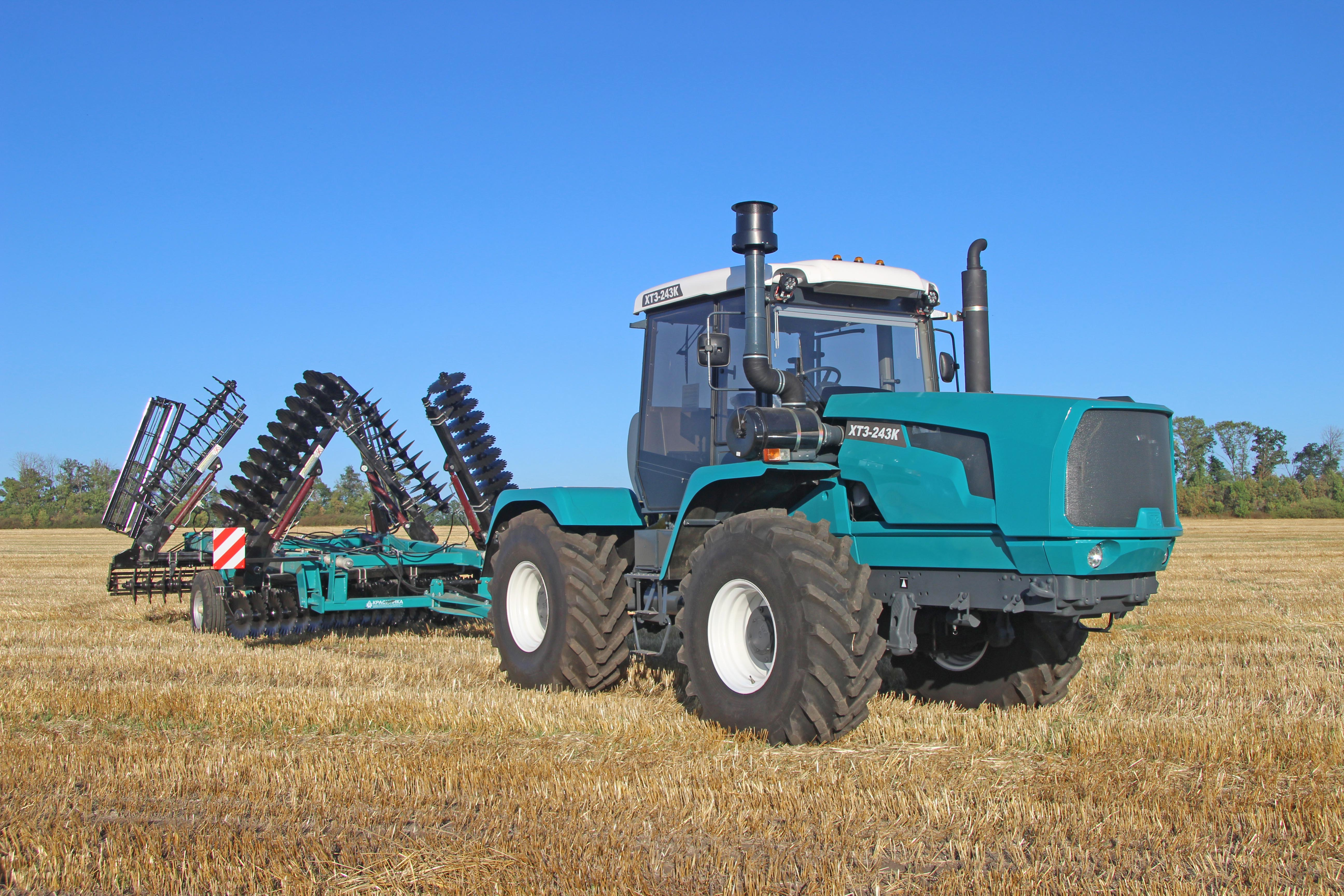
KhTZ (Ukraine)

- KhTZ (Kharkiv Tractor Plant) (Ukraine)
- Kioti (part of Daedong)(South Korea)
- Kirovets (Kirov Plant St Petersburg) (Russia)
- Kubota (Japan)

== L ==
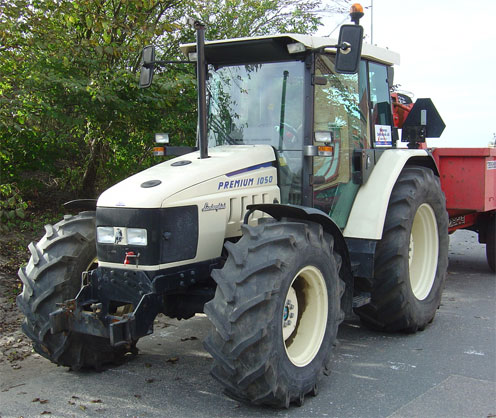
Lamborghini tractor in India

- Lamborghini (Italy) (part of SDF)
- Landini (Italy) (part of ARGO SpA)
- Lindner (Austria)
- LiuGong (China)
- Lovol (China) (formerly Foton)
  - Aupax
- LS Mtron (South Korea)
  - LS

== M ==
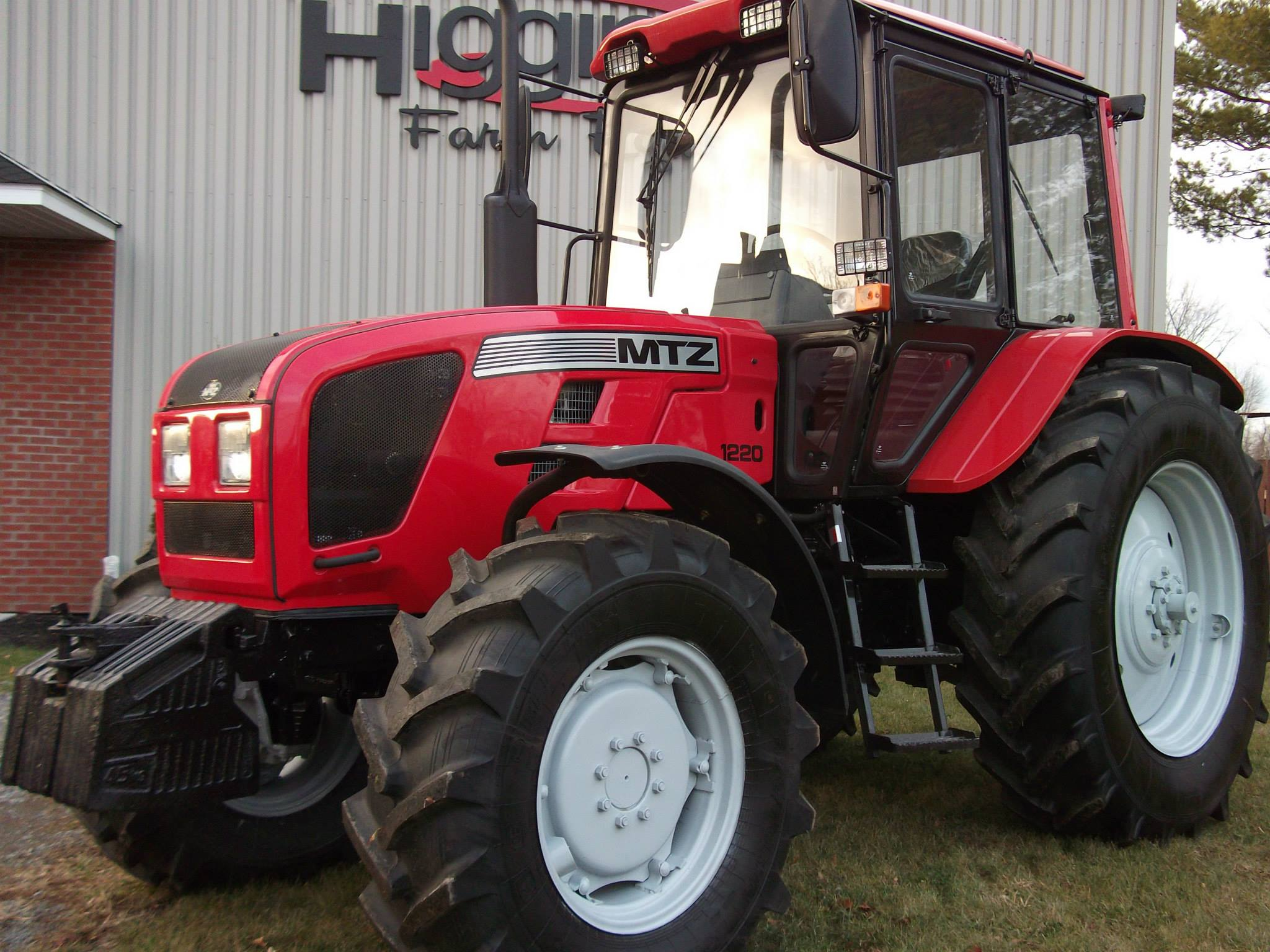
MTZ (Belarus)

- Mahindra Tractors (India)
  - Erkunt (Turkey)(part of Mahindra)
    - ArmaTrac
  - Mahindra
  - Mitsubishi Agricultural Machinery (Japan)(own 33.3%)
  - Trakstar (formerly Mahindra Gujarat and Shaktimaan brands)
- Majevica (Serbia)
- Massey Ferguson (US)(part of AGCO Corporation)
- McCormick Tractors (Italy)(part of ARGO SpA)
- Millat (Pakistan)
- Mitsubishi Agricultural Machinery (Japan) (part of Mahindra)
- MoAZ (Belarus)
- MTZ (Belarus)
  - Belarus
- Mingsin Tractors (China)

== N ==
- New Holland (US)(part of CNH Industrial N.V.)

== P ==
- Pauny (Argentina)
- Pol-Mot (Poland)
  - Ursus (Poland)
- Preet (India)
- Pronar (Poland)

== R ==
- Renault (France)
- Rogers & Compañía Limitada (Chile)
- Rostselmash (Russia)

== S ==
- SAME Deutz-Fahr (SDF) (Italy)
  - Deutz-Fahr (Germany)
  - Hurlimann
  - Lamborghini
  - SAME
- Siam Kubota (Thailand)
- Solis Mexico Tractor (Mexico)
- Sonalika International (India)(purch by Yanmar)
- Steyr (Austria) (part of CNH Industrial N.V.)

== T ==
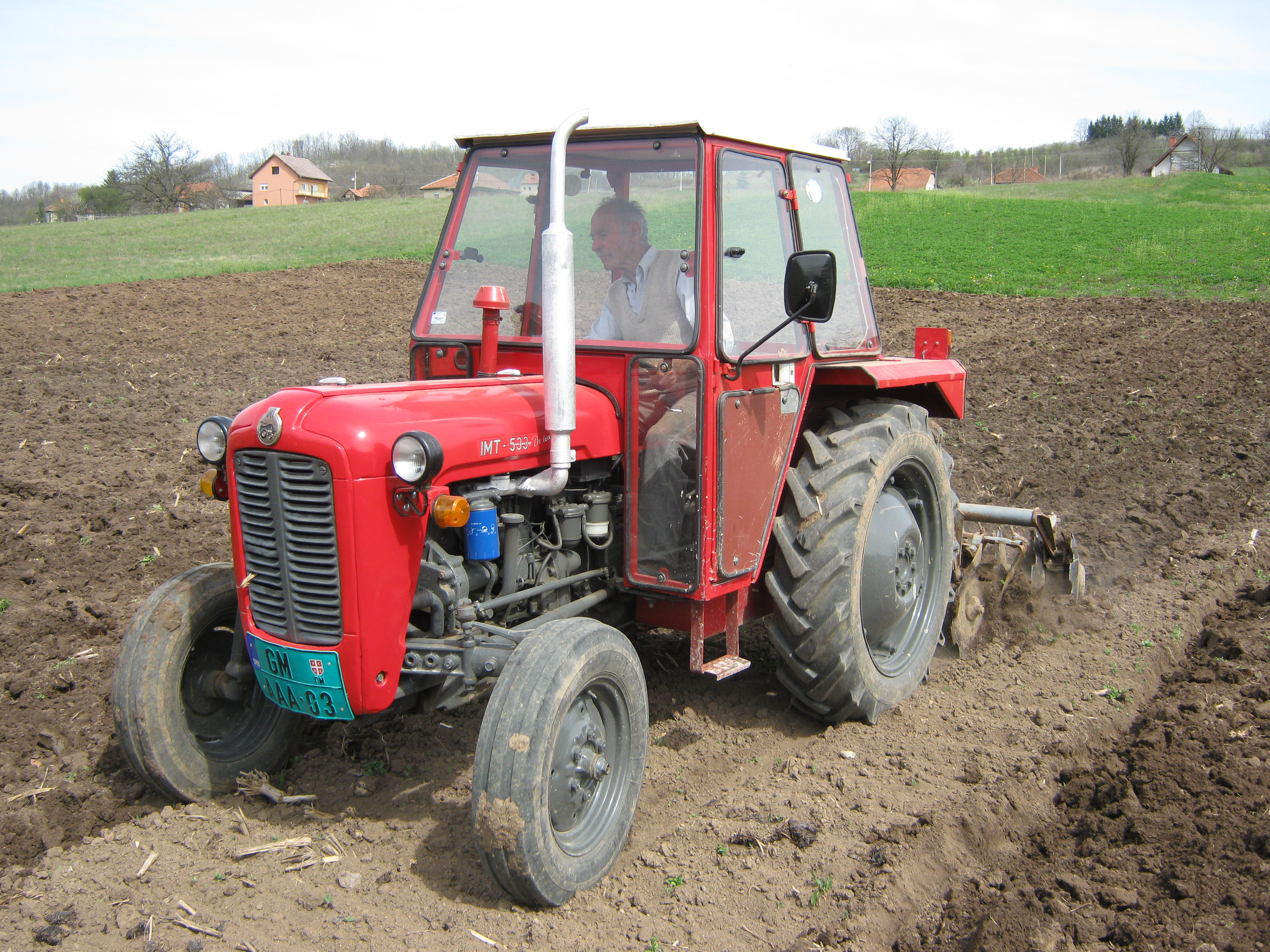
IMT (Serbia)

- Tractors And Farm Equipment (India)
  - Massey Ferguson Tractors
  - IMT (Serbia) (purchased by TAFE in 2018 and restarted)
  - Eicher Tractors
  - TAFE Tractors
- Telake (China)
- Terrion (Russia)
- TYM (South Korea)
- Toro
  - Ventrac
- Tumosan (Turkey)

== U ==
- Ursa Ag (Canada)
- Ursus (Brazil) (URSUS MÁQUINAS AGRÍCOLAS LTDA) (mfg licensed Mahindra)

== V ==
- Valpadana (Italy) (part of ARGO SpA concern)
- Valtra (Finland) (part of AGCO concern)
- Versatile (Canada) (owned by Basak Traktor)
- VST Tillers (India)

== W ==
- Wuzheng (China)

== Y ==
- Yaadim Development (Israel)
- Yagmur (Turkey)
  - Valpadana (licensed)
- Yanmar (Japan)
  - Solis/Sonalika Internatiinal (India)
- YTO (China)
- YuMZ (Ukraine)

== Z ==
- Zanello (Argentina)
- Zetor (Czech Republic)
- Zoomlion (China)

== See also ==
- Tractors in India - details of Indian tractor building history and brands
