= Pronar =

Polish manufacturer of motorcycles, agricultural related machinery

Pronar Sp. z o.o.
- Company type: Privately Held
- Industry: Agricultural machinery
- Founded: 1988
- Headquarters: Narew, Podlaskie Voivodeship, Poland
- Products: Tractors; Combine harvesters Agricultural trailers
- Number of employees: 2000+
- Website: www.pronar.pl

Pronar Sp. z o.o. is a Polish agricultural machinery manufacturer. The company was founded in 1988 and its headquarters is in Narew, Podlaskie Voivodeship, Poland. Its main products are tractors, combine harvesters and agricultural trailers.

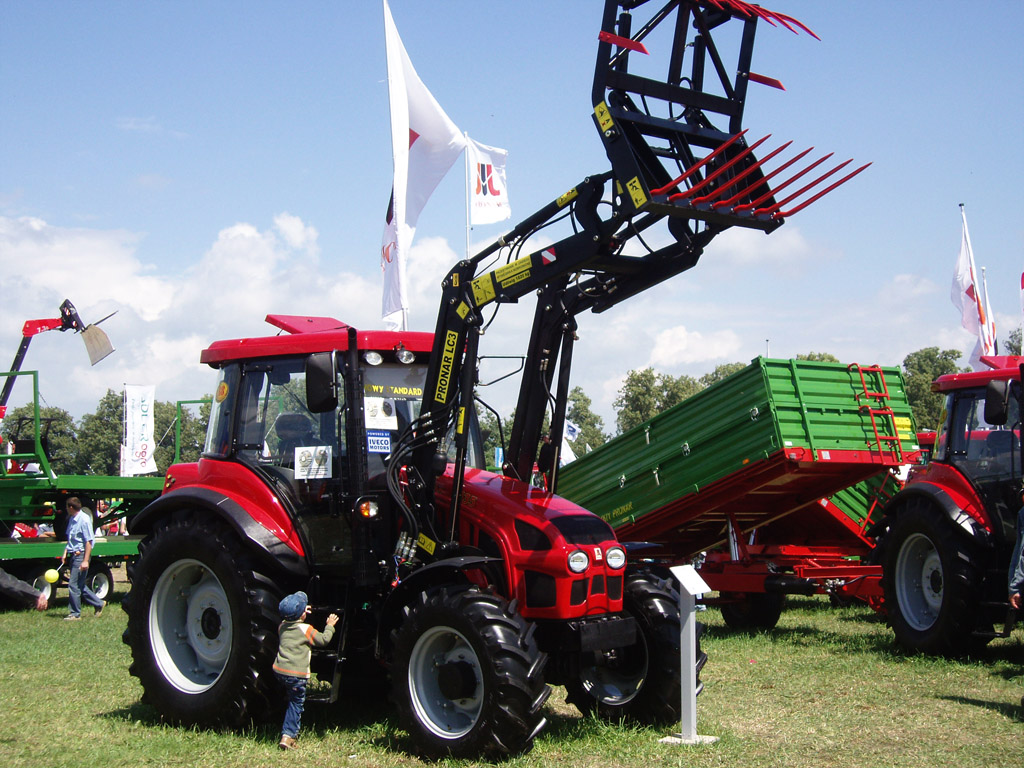
Pronar 5135

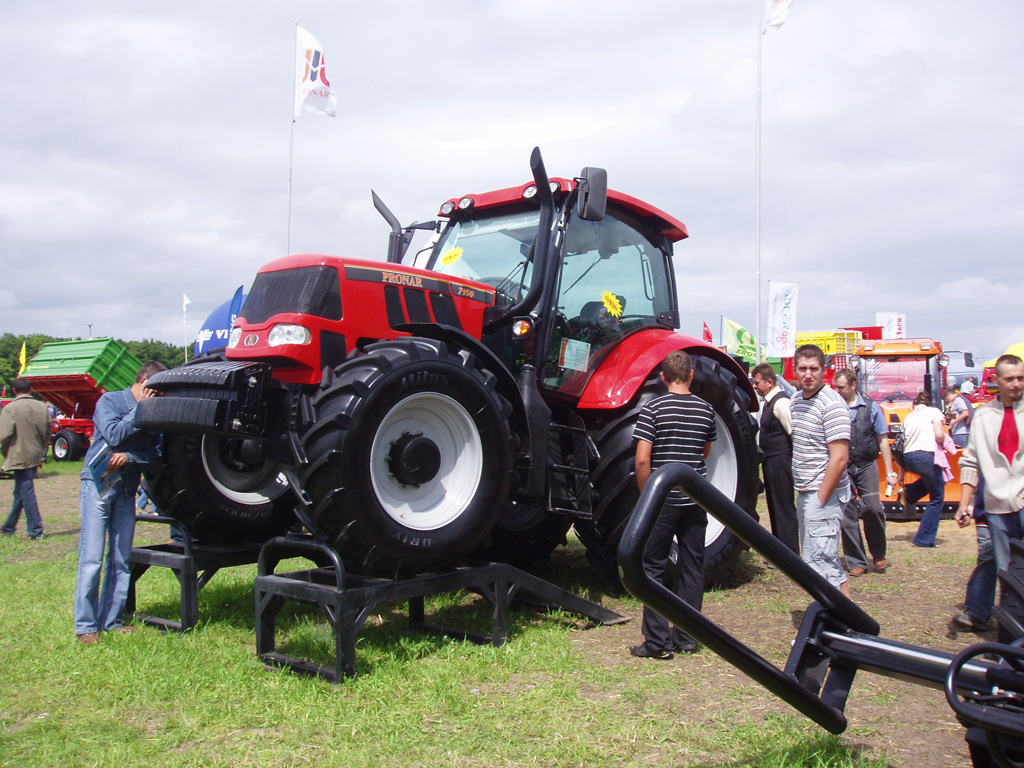
Pronar 7150

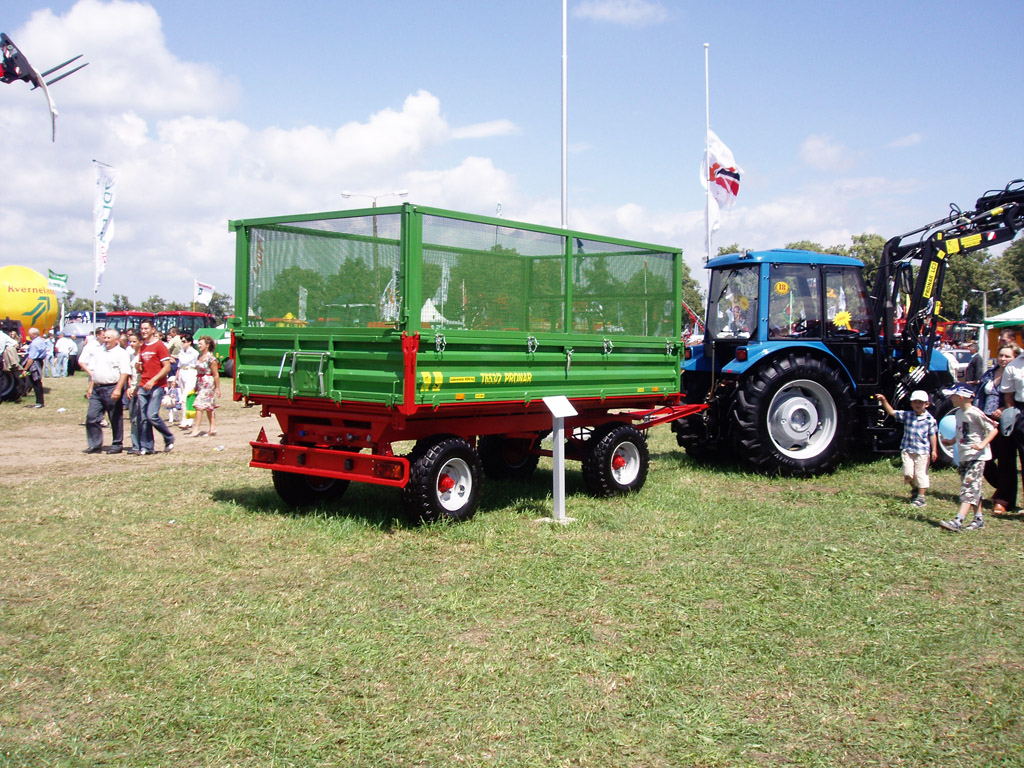
T653/2

== History ==
Pronar Sp. z o.o. was founded in 1988. In the early years, it was mainly occupied with exporting agri-food articles to the countries of the former Soviet Union. The company began assembling Belarusian tractors (Belarus/MTZ) MTZ-80 with the importing of the Minsk tractor factory components. Over the years, Pronar began to introduce new types of tractors with different specs. Imported parts and assemblies were gradually replaced by parts produced in Poland, and it transformed the existing assembly in production.

Pronar is the exclusive distributor in Poland of the Belarus and Kioti/Daedong tractors.

== Product Profile ==
Expanding its agricultural products, in 2003 the company began production of agricultural trailers and specialist trailers (including the transport of animals, transport of timber) with a capacity from 2 to 23 ton, and manure spreaders. Pronar also specializes in the production of municipal products (communal tractors, utility trailers, sweepers, snow plows, front loaders complete with alternative facilities).

In the year 2005, Pronar introduced the Vector brand of combine harvesters, built by RostSelMash.

In addition, Pronar-branded commercial operations and a network of petrol stations in the north-eastern Polish lead the market. It is also a distributor of steel materials of domestic origin and the world.

In 1997, Pronar Wheels Department was founded. At the beginning manufacturing wheels for Pronar's manchinery. With time the offer was extended and at the moment Pronar Wheels is Europe's leading manufacturer of wheels for agricultural, forestry and industrial applications.

Since 1998, Pronar has manufactured hydraulic components and pneumatic power, and since 2001, manufactured plastic components.

In 2012, Pronar broke into the UK market and distributed products with the help of Bob Mills via Agritrend LTD.

== Tractor Models ==
- Pronar Series I
  - Pronar 320AM 26.5 kW (35 hp)
  - Pronar 320AMK of 26.5 kW (35 hp)
  - Pronar 82A of 57.4 kW (81 hp)
  - Pronar 82SA of 57.4 kW (81 hp)
  - Pronar 82TSA of 65 kW (90 hp)
  - Pronar 1025 74 kW (105 hp)
  - Pronar 1221 96 kW (130 hp)
  - Pronar 1523 111 kW (151 hp)

Models 82A, 82SA, 82TSA and 1025 are also available in forestry versions.

- Pronar Series II
  - Pronar 82A-II 58.7 kW (79.8 hp)
  - Pronar 82SA-II 58.7 kW (79.8 hp)
  - Pronar 82TSA-II 66.7 (90.7 hp)
  - Pronar 1025-II 77 kW (104.7 hp)
  - Pronar for 1221-II, 96.9 kW (131.8 hp)
- Pronar P5 Series
  - Pronar 5110 60 kW (81.6 hp)
  - Pronar 5115 60 kW (81.6 hp)
  - Pronar 5130 72.5 kW (98.6 hp)
  - Pronar 5135 74 kW (100.6 hp)
  - Pronar 5235 71 kW (96.6 hp)
- Pronar P7
  - Pronar 5112 60 kW (82 hp)
  - Pronar 5122 66 kW (90 hp)
- Zefir
  - Zefir 40k Zefir of 29.4 kW (40 hp)
  - Zefir 85 62.5 kW (84.9 hp)
- Pronar P6 Series
  - Pronar 7150 129.3 kW (180 hp)
- Pronar P9 Series
  - Pronar on 8140 195 kW (265 hp)
- Pronar Żubroń 2048 - WP maksymlanej power of 44.9 kW (no longer produced)

== Trailers ==
- Single Axle - T654, T654 / 1, T655, T671, T681 [1]
- Two axles - T653, T653 / 1, T653 / 2, T672, T672 / 1, T672 / 1, Silo, T672 / 2, T680, T680 Special
- Three-axis T780
- Tandem T663, T663 / 1, T663 / 1, Silo, T663 / 2, T663 / 3, T683
- Tridem T682
- Skorupowe T669, T669 / 1, T679, T679 / 1, T700
- Specialist 6 Courier, Courier 10, Heros N162, N262 Hercules, N262 / 1 Herkules14, T022, T023, T024, T025, T026, T185, T185 KO2, T285, T644, T679 / 2, T701, T740, T900

== Motorcycles ==
- Pronar # 125 / 2
- Pronar # 125 / 4 - was created by 2006

== Pronar Wheels ==
Pronar Wheels Department manufactures single piece wheels up to 54" in diameter and up to 36" in width.

Pronar Wheels Department offers also dual wheels systems and complete wheel assemblies with tires.

In agricultural applications Pronar wheels are used in machines like tractors, combines, grain carts, self proppeled and trailed sprayers.

Pronar exports wheels to customers across the World.

Pronar's OEM customers includes AGCO (brands Valtra, Massey Ferguson, Fendt), Kubota, Zetor, Ammann Group, ARGO SpA (Landini, McCormick) and many others.

== Pronar Components ==
Pronar manufactures and market components used in agricultural machine production i.e. steel sidewalls, axles, pneumatic and hydraulic components.

Since 2012 Pronar manufacture steel sidewalls for use in agricultural trailers. Steel sidewalls are rolleformed and laser welded.

The axle production department was established in 2012. Now is located in new factory opened in 2017 in Hanjnowka. Pronar manufacture braked and unbraked axles and half-shafts. The range of products can be used in machines with payload from 4 to 24 t. Axles and half-shafts are designed for: agricultural trailers, sprayers, large-size cultivating units, construction, municipal and forestry machines.

== See also ==
- List of tractor manufacturers
