= Valpadana =

Italian agricultural machinery manufacturer

- Company type: Subsidiary
- Industry: Agricultural machinery
- Founded: 1935
- Headquarters: Fabbrico, Reggio Emilia, Emilia-Romagna, Italy
- Number of locations: 4 plants
- Area served: Worldwide
- Key people: Valerio Morra (Argo President)
- Products: Tractors
- Revenue: €447 million (2011)
- Number of employees: Approx. 1600
- Parent: ARGO SpA
- Website: Official website

Valpadana is an Italian agricultural machinery manufacturer. The company is headquartered in Fabbrico in the Province of Reggio Emilia, in the region of Emilia-Romagna, Italy. The company manufactures tractors for agricultural uses. It was purchased by ARGO SpA in 1995, and operates as part of the ARGO Tractors Group, a division of ARGO SpA. ARGO is also the owner of Landini, McCormick Tractors and formerly Laverda (now owned by AGCO Corp).

== History ==
Valpadana was founded in 1935 in San Martino in Rio, Italy. In 1954, the company manufactured its first lawn mower. In 1959, it opened a new production plant. The first tractor was produced in 1960. In 1966, the company created the SEP division. The division focused on the commercialization of motor mowers. It produced its first reverse drive tractor with the driving position on a rotating platform in 1988. In 1995, the company was purchased by Argo SpA, owned by the Morra family. That same year Landini, a division of Argo, acquired in 1994, took over Valpadana. After being purchased by ARGO, Valpadana expanded its production line offering specialized tractors, such as for vineyards and orchards.

== Product range ==
Valpadana offers three categories of tractors: one-way 4 wheel equal size, reversible 4 wheel equal size, and specialized. The one-way 4 wheel equal size tractor has three basic models the 4600, 6400, and 6600, these basic models each offer different versions. There are seven specialized versions of the one-way 4 wheel equal size tractor. The reversible 4 wheel equal size tractor has two basic models, the 6600 and the 9600, there are three specialized versions of this tractor line. The specialized tractor line offers one basic model, the 3600, which has six specialized versions.

== See also ==
- ARGO SpA
