= Feller =

Feller or Fellers may refer to:

- Feller (surname), a list of people with the surname Feller or de Feller
- Fellers (surname), a list of people
- another name for a lumberjack
- Feller College, a former boarding school in Quebec, Canada
- Feller Bach, a tributary of the Moselle River in Rhineland-Palatinate, Germany
- Feller buncher, forestry machine
- Fellers (film), an Australian comedy

== See also ==
- Fella (disambiguation)
- Fellow (disambiguation)
