= Fella =

Fella may refer to: a unformal term for a person most likely a male.

== People ==
- Fella El Djazairia, stage name of Algerian singer, pianist and performer Fella Ababsa (born 1961)
- Fella Makafui (born 1995), Ghanaian actress
- Edward Fella (born 1938), American graphic designer, artist and educator
- Giuseppe Fella (born 1993), Italian footballer

== Other uses ==
- Fella-Werke, a German agricultural machine manufacturer
- Fellach, also called Fella, a river of Bavaria, Germany
- Fella (river), a river near Tarvisio, Friuli Venezia Giulia, Italy
- "Fella", the official DeviantArt mascot
- Fella, a 2018 album by Danheim

== See also ==
- Feller (disambiguation)
- Fellow (disambiguation)
- NAFO (group)
