= Feller (surname) =

Feller is a surname. Notable people with the surname include:

- Abraham Feller (1904–1952), American official and diplomat
- Anke Feller (born 1971), German sprinter
- Bob Feller (1918–2010), American baseball player
- Carlos Feller (1923–2018), Argentinian operatic bass
- Catherine Feller (born 1939), British actress and educator
- Daniel Feller, American historian
- Dick Feller (born 1943), American country musician and songwriter
- Dorothee Feller (born 1966), German politician
- Eugen Viktor Feller (1871–1936), Croatian pharmacist and entrepreneur, father of William
- François-Xavier de Feller (1735–1802), Belgian writer
- Frank Feller (1848–1908), Swiss illustrator and painter
- Georg-Wolfgang Feller (1915–1991), German World War II naval officer
- Harald Feller (1913–2003), Swiss diplomat who saved Hungarian Jews from the Holocaust
- Harald Feller (organist), (born 1951), German organist, choral conductor and composer
- James Happy Feller (born 1949), American football player
- Joachim Feller (1638–1691), German professor from Leipzig
- Jules Feller (1859–1940), Belgian linguist and Walloon militant
- Karl Feller, American trade unionist
- Manuel Feller (born 1992), Austrian skier
- Naomie Feller (born 2001), French footballer
- Peter Feller (c. 1920–1998), American theatrical set builder
- Rose Feller (born 1975), Hungarian artist
- Sébastien Feller (born 1991), French chess grandmaster suspended for cheating
- Sherm Feller (1918–1994), American composer, radio personality and baseball announcer
- Sid Feller (1916–2006), American musical conductor
- William Feller (1906–1970), Croatian-American mathematician
