= Fellow (disambiguation) =

A fellow is a member of a group of learned people.

Fellow may also refer to:

- Fellow (emulator), an emulator designed to run Amiga software
- Fellow, a commonly used synonym for man
- The Fellow, a racehorse

== See also ==
- Fella (disambiguation)
- Feller (disambiguation)
