= Rolo, Emilia-Romagna =

Rolo
- Comune
- Comune di Rolo
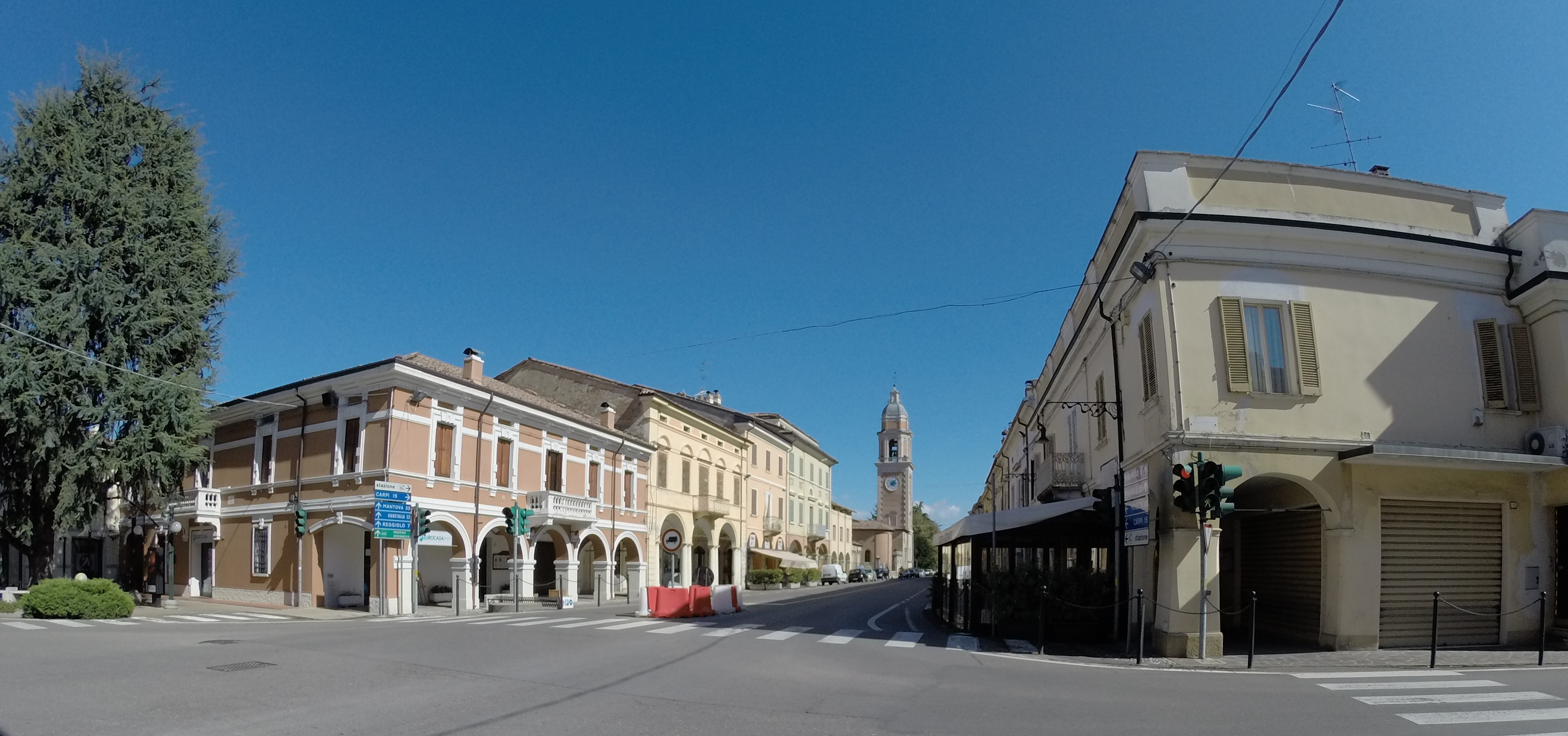
- View of Rolo

- Location within Italy Location within Emilia-Romagna
- Coordinates: 44°53′N 10°51′E
- Country: Italy
- Region: Emilia-Romagna
- Province: Reggio Emilia (RE)
- Frazioni: Ronchi

Government
  - Mayor: Ruggero Baraldi

Area
  - Total: 14.17 km^{2} (5.47 sq mi)
- Elevation: 21 m (69 ft)

Population (31 December 2017)
  - Total: 4,062
  - Density: 286.7/km^{2} (742.5/sq mi)
- Demonym: Rolesi
- Time zone: UTC+1 (CET)
  - Summer (DST): UTC+2 (CEST)
- Postal code: 42047
- Dialing code: 0522
- Patron saint: St. Zeno
- Saint day: April 12
- Website: Official website

Rolo (Reggiano: Rôl or Rōl) is a comune (municipality) in the Province of Reggio Emilia in the Italian region Emilia-Romagna, located about 60 kilometres (37 mi) northwest of Bologna and about 25 kilometres (16 mi) northeast of Reggio Emilia.

Rolo borders the following municipalities: Carpi, Fabbrico, Moglia, Novi di Modena, Reggiolo.
