= Al-Ghazi Tractors =

Pakistani agricultural machinery assembler

Al-Ghazi Tractors Ltd.
- Native name: ال غازی ٹریکٹر
- Company type: Public
- Traded as: PSX: AGTL
- Industry: Agricultural machinery
- Founded: June 26, 1983
- Headquarters: Karachi-75500, Pakistan
- Area served: Pakistan
- Key people: Yasin Seker (CEO); Robert Ian McAllister (chairperson)
- Products: Tractors
- Revenue: ▲ Rs. 34.543 billion (US$120 million) (2023)
- Operating income: ▲ Rs. 5.043 billion (US$18 million) (2023)
- Net income: ▲ Rs. 2.611 billion (US$9.3 million) (2023)
- Total assets: ▲ Rs. 14.229 billion (US$51 million) (2023)
- Total equity: ▲ Rs. 5.780 billion (US$21 million) (2023)
- Owner: Al-Futtaim Group (50.02%); CNH Industrial (43.17%)
- Number of employees: 410 (2023)
- Parent: CNH Industrial; Al-Futtaim Group
- Website: alghazitractors.com
- Footnotes / references Financials as of 31 December 2023

Al-Ghazi Tractors Ltd (AGTL) (Urdu: ال غازی ٹریکٹر) is a Pakistani agricultural machinery assembler headquartered in Karachi with a tractor manufacturing plant located in Dera Ghazi Khan. It is a subsidiary of CNH Industrial and Al-Futtaim Group.

Al-Ghazi Tractors assembles New Holland tractors in Pakistan with the production capacity of 30,000. It is one of the two major tractor manufacturers of Pakistan, other is Millat Tractors.

== History ==
Al-Ghazi Tractors was founded in 1983 and started production at its plant located in Dera Ghazi Khan. It was listed on the Karachi Stock Exchange in 1985.

In 1991, Al-Futtaim Group took over the management control of Al-Ghazi Tractors by acquiring 50 percent of its shares for PKR 104.36 million (US$4.26 million).

== Products ==
Al-Ghazi produced a wide range of models which include:

- Ghazi
- 480S
- 640
- NH 70-56
- NH Dabung 85 (discontinued)
- NH 850

Al Ghazi also produces generators and farming equipment.

== See also ==
- List of tractor manufacturers
