= McCormick Tractors =

Italian agricultural machinery manufacturer

McCormick Tractors International Ltd.
- Company type: Subsidiary
- Industry: Agricultural machinery
- Founded: 2000
- Headquarters: Fabbrico, Italy
- Products: Tractors
- Number of employees: 1100
- Parent: ARGO SpA

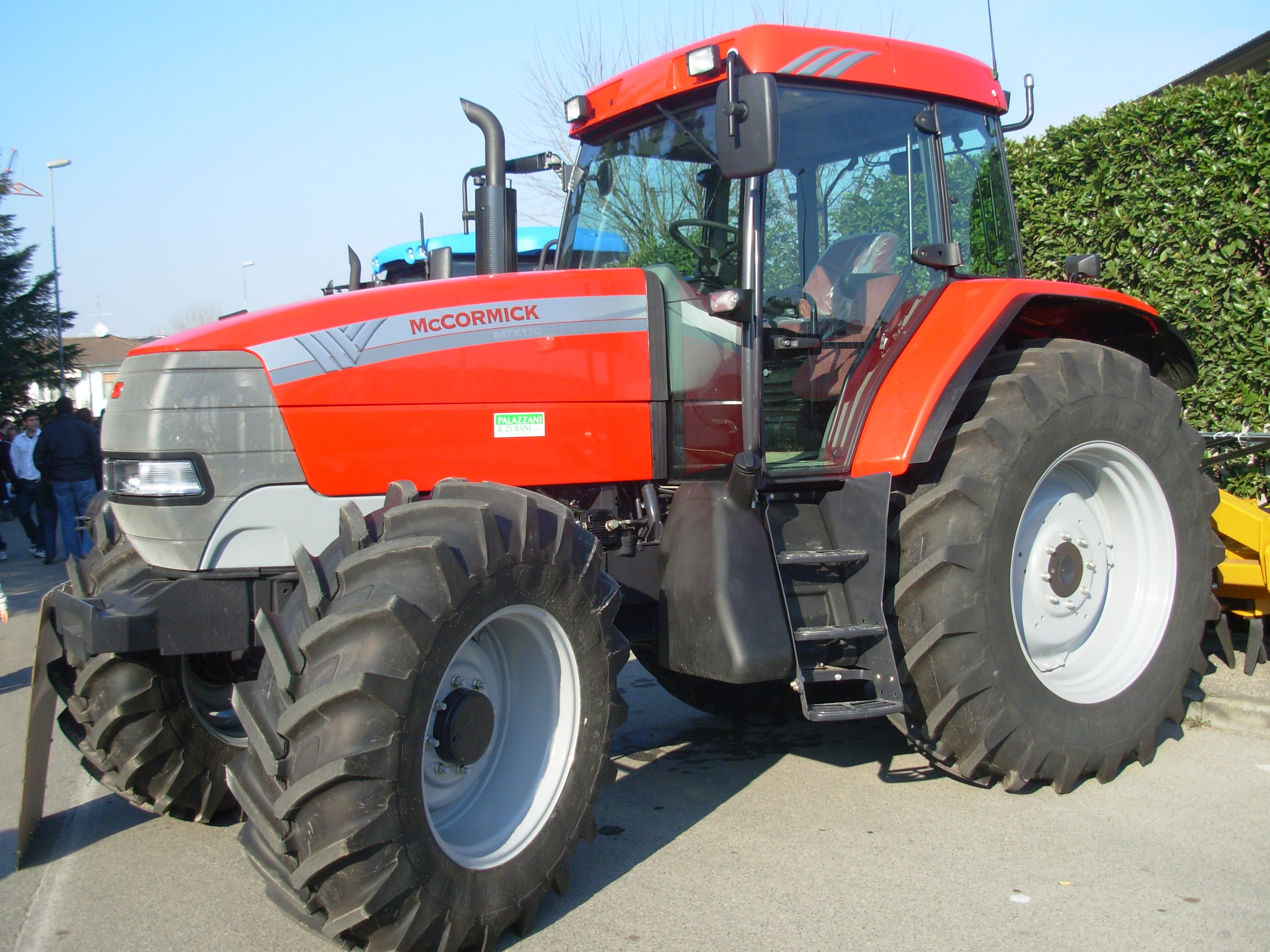
McCormick MTX120

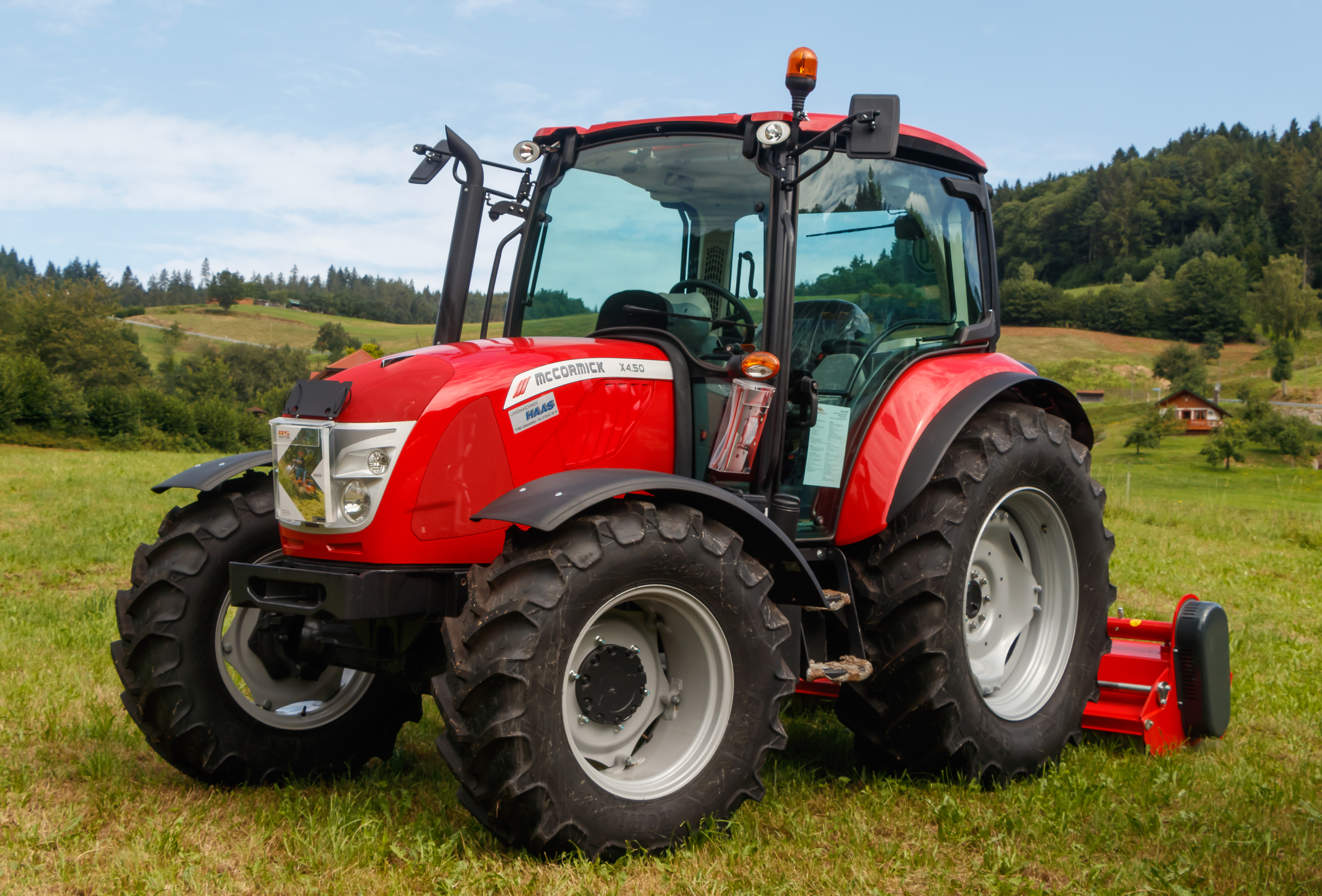
McCormick X4.50 T4i

McCormick Tractors International Ltd. is the agricultural machinery company formed in 2000 when Case IH divested assets in order to gain European Union regulatory approval to merge with New Holland Ag. The initial assets of McCormick bought by ARGO SpA were the Case IH tractor manufacturing plant in Doncaster, England, the rights to the Case IH model C, CX and MX-C and a licence to build MX Maxxum tractors. Most of the remainder of the Case IH and New Holland assets became CNH Global. The tractors are named for the McCormick family of Chicago and Virginia.

In June 2001, the company purchased the rights to build the MX transmssion and the factory in Saint-Dizier, France formerly owned and operated by Case IH. This site was previously the home of McCormick power train components in the 1950s.

In December 2001, the announcement was made that McCormick Tractors International would be organizing McCormick International USA to be based near, and supported by Vermeer Corporation located in Pella, IA.

The Doncaster plant was the headquarters of the McCormick company. The plant had a long history of producing tractors for Case IH and International Harvester and under its new ownership continued to produce tractors for Case IH under the terms of a European antitrust agreement.

In December 2006, ARGO SpA announced that the Doncaster facility was to close with the loss of around 325 jobs. The statement immediately hit the local news, not only for the job losses, but also because the announcement came a week before Christmas.

In 2007, all McCormick tractor production was moved to Fabbrico, Italy. The Fabbrico site had been the main Landini factory and together with other ARGO Group factories in the area has since manufactured a common line of products carrying the Landini and McCormick brands. The last tractor rolled off the Doncaster assembly line on 14 December 2007, an XTX series tractor. The KamAZ company purchased and transferred the assembly line with a view to assembling a version of the XTX series tractor in Russia.

McCormick Tractors International Ltd was a subsidiary of ARGO SpA until production was transferred to the ARGO Tractors factory in Italy and 'McCormick' became a brand only.

In 2011, the Saint-Dizier plant was sold to YTO, a Chinese firm and transmission production was moved to Italy.

International sales, service support and marketing activities transferred to the Italian factory and an independent distributor took on these responsibilities for Great Britain, and also for all of Ireland in 2017.

== See also ==
- List of tractor manufacturers
