= Rana Khudadad Khan =

Pakistani politician

Rana Khudadad Khan was a Pakistani industrialist and politician who served as the president of the Pakistan Muslim League (Punjab). He was also co-founding chairman of Rana Tractors with his brother Rana Allahdad Khan.
