= Laverda (harvesters) =

Italian combine harvester manufacturer

- Our Reliability, Your Productivity
- Company type: Subsidiary
- Industry: Automotive industry
- Founded: 1873; 153 years ago
- Founder: Pietro Laverda
- Headquarters: Breganze, Italy
- Number of locations: 1 plant
- Area served: Worldwide
- Products: Combine harvesters
- Parent: AGCO
- Website: www.laverdaworld.com/en/home

Laverda is a manufacturer of combine harvesters and hay equipment, based in Breganze, Italy. It was founded in 1873 by Pietro Laverda to produce farming implements in the province of Vicenza. 1956 was the year the first self-propelled Laverda combine, the M 60, was manufactured. Laverda formed a partnership with Fiat in 1981, and would be a part of that company for some 20 years.

The Morra family's holding company, ARGO SpA, bought Laverda in 2000 as Fiat was merging its New Holland Agriculture group with Case IH to form CNH Global. In 2007, ARGO sold 50% of the Laverda business to AGCO, the remaining 50% of the joint venture was eventually sold in 2011 and the Breganze plant became AGCO's European center of excellence for harvesting.

== History ==
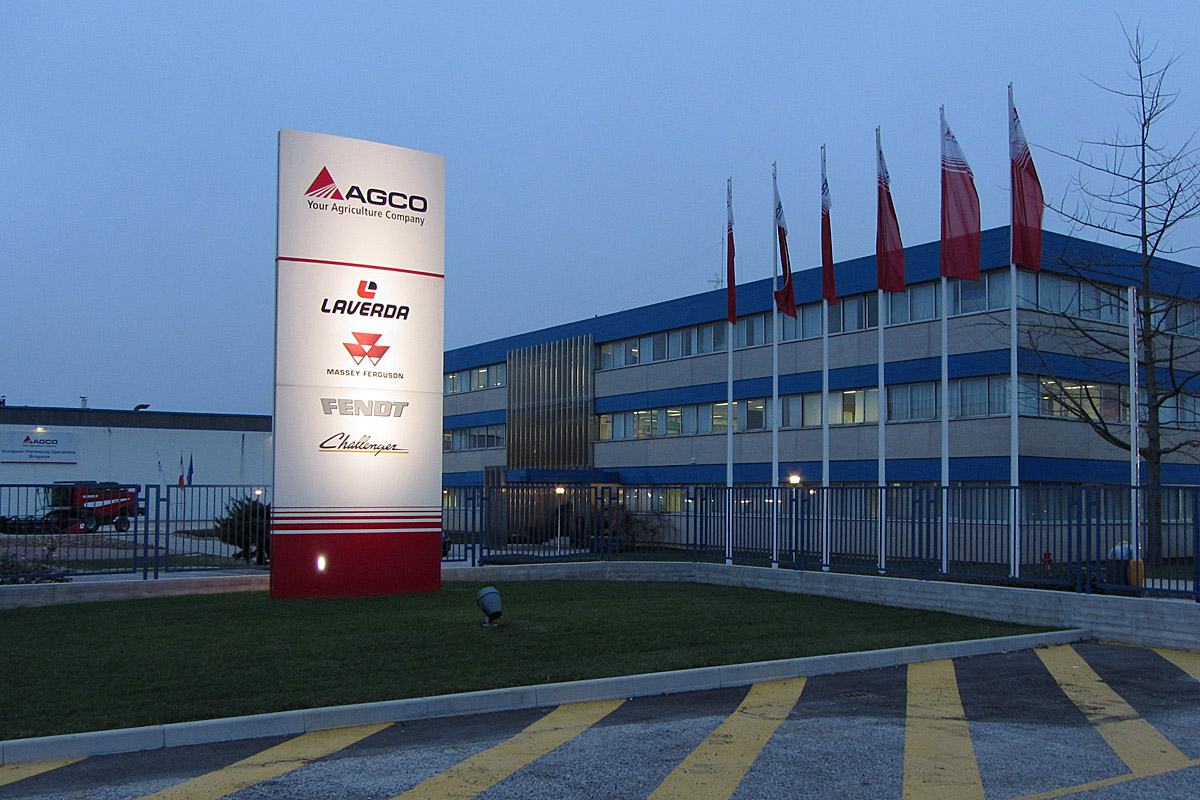
Laverda headquarter and production site in Breganze, Italy

1873 Pietro Laverda established “Ditta Pietro Laverda”, the first craftsman's workshop that produced farming implements, wine-making machines and bell-tower clocks in S.Giorgio di Perlena, in the Province of Vicenza.

1905 Having moved to Breganze, to the place that was to remain the headquarters for more than seventy years, the company took on an industrial character with over 100 employees. The production catered to the needs of agriculture that was just becoming aware of mechanization: manual threshing machines, straw cutters, grain fans, wine presses, corn shellers, etc.

1919 At the end of the First World War and with the arms industry phase having been brought to a close, activities were fully resumed with the collaboration of Pietro Laverda's sons, Giovanni and Antonio. New models were introduced amongst which the first patented hydraulic press.

1930 The young grandsons of the founder, Pietro Jr and G.Battista took over from Pietro Laverda Sr at the company's helm.

1934 Laverda presented the first towed mowing machine to be made in Italy, model 48 A.

1938 This was the year that reaper-binder ML6 was presented, the first Italian model, forerunner of a series of machines that was to influence Italian grain cultivation for decades. It was with this machine that Laverda entered the harvesting machine sector.

1947 The first self-propelled mower was produced in the Breganze plant.

1956 Laverda designed and built the first Italian self-propelled combine harvester, the M 60 model.

1963 This was the year in which the M 120 combine harvester was created. By now, the company had over 1000 employees divided amongst three production divisions.

1967 Laverda entered the market of large forage harvesting machines with the AFC 110 self-propelled mower, followed by the even larger AFC 150 model.

1971 Production of the M 100 AL began. This was the first combine harvester in the world to be equipped with a crosswise and longitudinal Self-levelling system.

1973 The company celebrated its hundredth anniversary, emphasized by the significant slogan “Laverda: from the time the hand became machine ”. This was also the year of the TA 150 forage harvester, with heads able to harvest maize, forage and grain crops.

1975 New combine range: models M 92, M 112, M 132 and M 152.

1981 At a time of intensive development, the company built a new plant in Breganze and started a partnership with Fiat group doomed to last 20 years. The modern production lines in this new facility spawned the M 182, the first model to be equipped with electronically controlled functions.

1983 Laverda proceeded by developing new models, beginning with the 3000 Series.

1992 Laverda proposed and developed the “levelling system”, specifically designed for combines working on sloping ground, and the MCS (Multi Crop Separator) system for separating the product. The number of combines produced now exceeded 50,000.

2000-01 The Breganze plant was taken over by Argo SpA, the holding company belonging to the Morra family, owner of Landini Tractors trademark and company. The new owners forcefully relaunched Laverda's historic trademark on the market with a new range of combines, big balers and round balers.

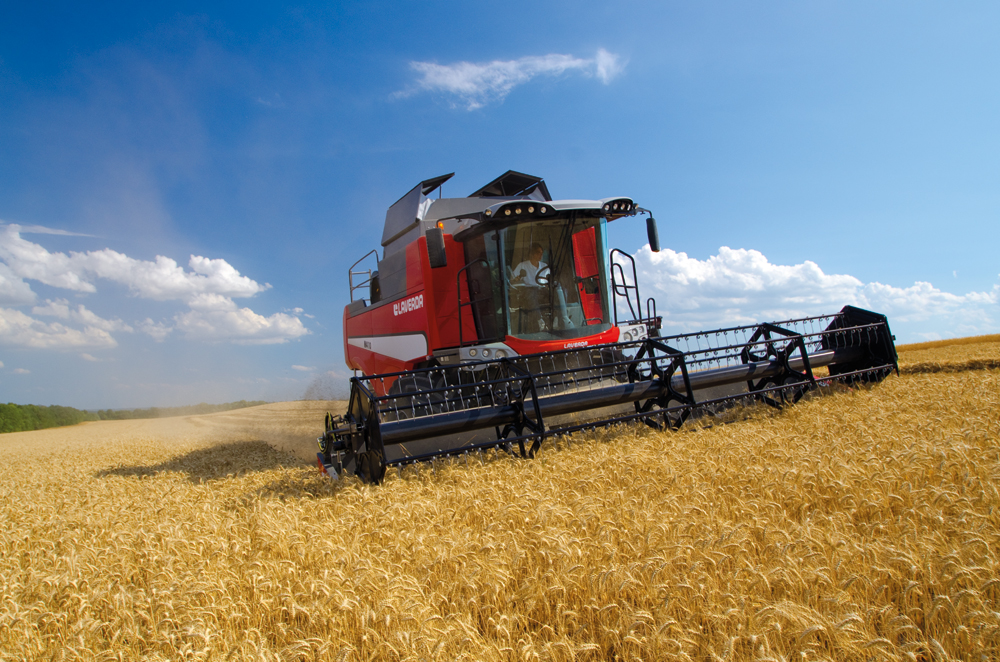
Laverda M 410 combine model

2002-03 Laverda presented the new LXE Series, M Series and the new Self-levelling combine Series.

2004 Acquisition of the Fella-Werke plant and trademark. Launch of the REV Series for the 2004-2005 sales campaign.

2005 The year got off to a good start with a shareholding agreement with Gallignani SpA, an important manufacturer of pick-up balers.

2006 It was the year of the new LCS Laverda Crop System Series.

2007 Argo SpA officially announced the establishment of a 50% joint venture between Laverda SpA and AGCO Corporation, based in Duluth (Georgia), a major worldwide manufacturer and distributor of agricultural equipment. Laverda has been operating since 2004 in close partnership with AGCO supplying the corporation with its combines decaled in the Massey Ferguson, Fendt and Challenger brands.

2011 AGCO purchased the remaining 50% of the shares of Laverda and Fella.

== Product Range ==
- M 400 Series
- M 400 LC Series
- M 300 Series
- M 200 Series
- Self-levelling Series

== See also ==
- Laverda motorcycle
- List of Italian companies
