= Super Landini =

Tractor model

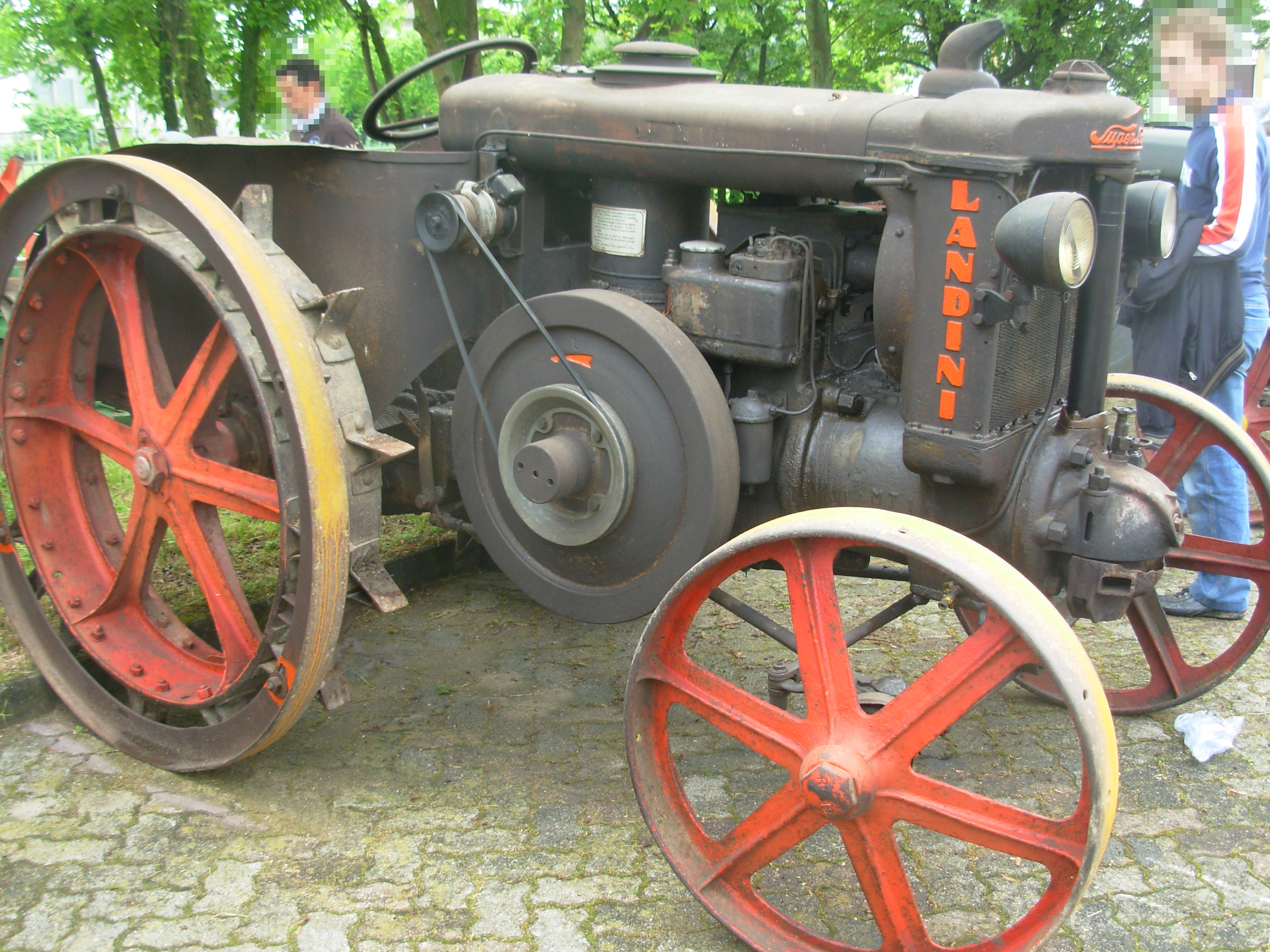
- A Super Landini model
- Type: Agricultural, industrial
- Manufacturer: Landini
- Production: 1934–1959
- Weight: 8,050 pounds (3,650 kg)
- Gross power: 50 horsepower (37 kW)

The Super Landini (S.L. 50) was a tractor produced by Landini, Italy.

== History ==
The tractor was produced in over 3,200 units in Fabbrico in Emilia-Romagna. It was started by heating the metal head with a flame from a petrol or gas lamp until it became red hot in a few minutes; for this reason the tractor received the nickname of Landini Testa Calda (Hot Head). The fuel injection pump was then manually operated two or three times, and with an adequate rotation of the flywheel operating the piston, the cylinder volume was compressed and combustion was triggered.

== Specification ==
This model has a fully loaded weight of 3,650 kg. The engine, transmission, and differential are grouped together in a single, chassis-like structure. The disc clutch is housed in the right-hand flywheel, and the transmission is mechanical with three speeds and one reverse gear, with top speeds ranging from 3.8 km/h to 7.8 km/h (9 km/h with tires) depending on the gear selected. Transmission is handled exclusively by the rear axle, equipped with a differential.

The first series of Super Landinis was produced from 1934 to 1937. It featured rounded, shell-shaped rear fenders that followed the profile of the wheels and flywheels with a slightly larger diameter than those of the later Super series. The latter offered a more ergonomic driving position, reminiscent of the characteristic shape of a Roman chariot; this configuration ensured greater safety for the operator.

As for the controls, the only pedal present, the clutch pedal, is located on the right-seide, while, as on all "burnt" Landinis, the accelerator control is a notched manual lever, located on the left wing; the handbrake lever is to the left of the differential lock.

== Bibliography ==
- Fontanesi Amos, Dal 1884 Landini, Fabbrico, Argo Tractors S.p.A., 1984, 193 p. (ISBN 3440059936)
- William Dozza, Trattori testacalda italiani, Milano, Giorgio Nada Editore, 2007, 179 p. (ISBN 9788879112192)
