= Fella-Werke =

German manufacturer of agricultural equipment based in Feucht, Germany

AGCO GmbH
- Industry: Agricultural machinery manufacturing
- Founded: Feucht (February 9, 1918)
- Founder: Josef Hackl, Albert Löffler
- Headquarters: Feucht, Germany
- Area served: Worldwide
- Products: Mowers, tedders, rakes etc.
- Services: Parts, service, training
- Parent: AGCO (USA)
- Website: fella.eu

AGCO GmbH is a German manufacturer of agricultural equipment based in Feucht, Germany, located just southwest of Nuremberg in Bavaria. It was established in 1918 as a harrow manufacturing company, and its product line has expanded since.

Currently, AGCO in Germany has the industry's largest product range of mowers, tedders and rakes. The machines are a vibrant red color with safety tarps in a bright yellow color. The logo is also a vibrant red square with a white circle inside which states Fella in bold black letters. The Fella slogan is ‘Harvesting Energy’.

== History ==
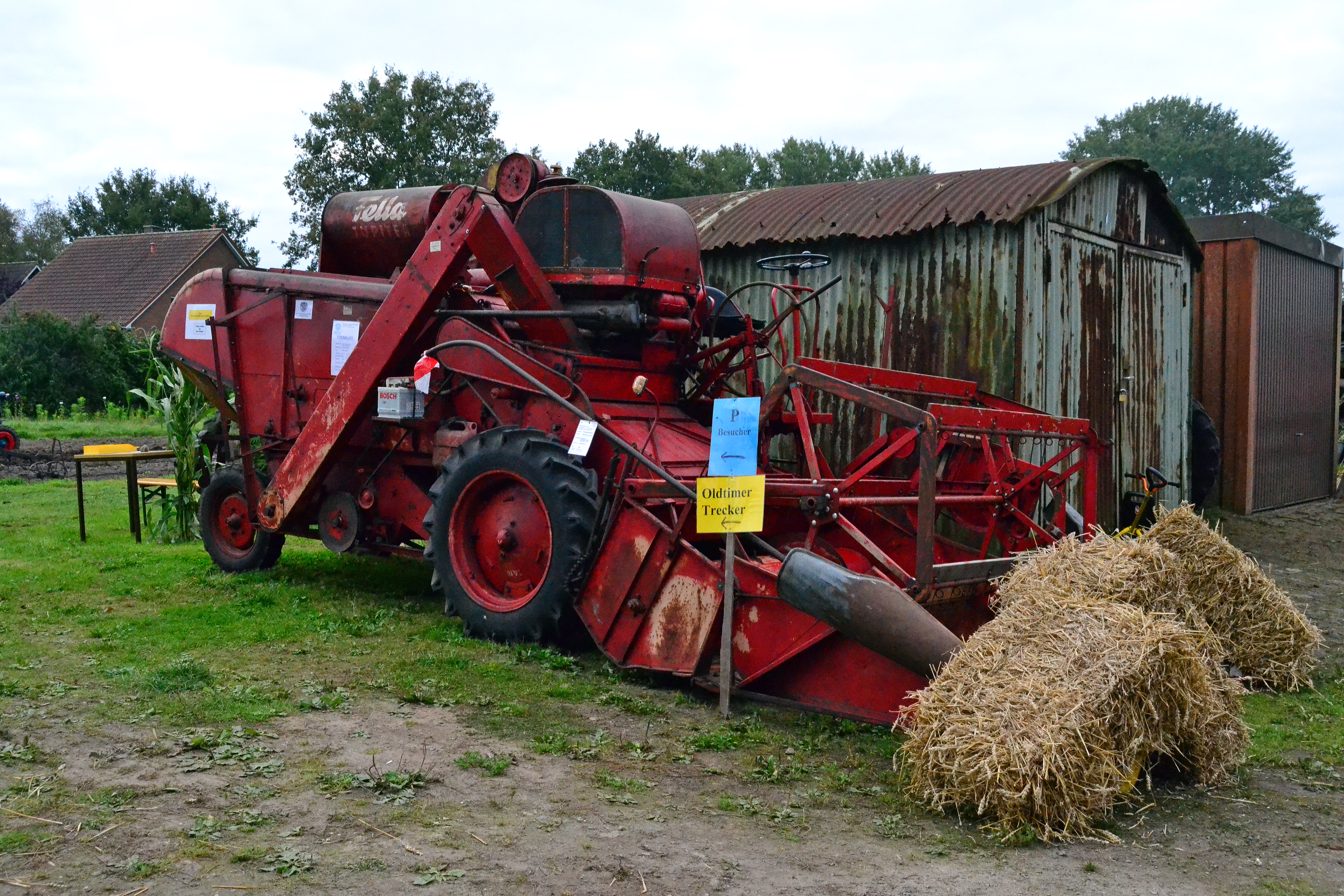
Self-propelled combine harvester Jupiter (1960)

In 1917, Josef Hackl and Albert Löffler came up with the idea to create a harrow manufacturing company. World War I would soon be over and there would undoubtedly be an increase in farm equipment demand and sales and metal working production. Hackl and Löffler wanted to take advantage of this business opportunity. They also benefited by being involved in Isaria-Zählerwerke (a company that produced radios and was later purchased by Siemens).

Isaria-Zählerwerke is a very important part of the history of Fella. The Board members of Isaria-Zählerwerke, which included Hackl, decided to undertake the Bayerische Harzprodukte-Fabrik GmbH, a company that produced wood products. This company leased out their land to the furniture company Karl Beer. That land also became important in the future of Fella-Werke. When Josef Hackl brought his idea to the Board members of Isaria-Zählerwerke and the Bayerische Harzprodukte-Fabrik GmbH, they thought it could work and decided to undertake it.

They decided to give the Bayerische Eggenfabrik AG (later to be known as Fella-Werke GmbH) a beginning share capital of 300,000 German Marks to set up the new company. The general thought was that after World War I there would be an increase in the demand of metal work. This demand could not be satisfied by the Munich-based Isaria-Zählerwerke alone.

Löffler left Isaria-Zählerwerke on 31 December 1917, and on 1 January 1918, he became Managing Director of the Bayerische Eggenfabrik AG in Feucht, Germany. The formal founding of the company took place on February 9, 1918, simultaneously while acquiring the land from the furniture company Karl Beer. The plot was approximately 9.3 acres (3.8 ha) and was acquired for 168,000 German marks.

Under the leadership of Löffler, what is now known as Fella-Werke GmbH began as a harrow production company. It did not take long before Fella started acquiring other companies, however. In 1923, Fella acquired a loader wagon company and in 1924, they added the production of ploughs to their line. In 1931, Fella took over Epple & Buxmann in Augsburg. This was a crucial step in their harvesting technology. In that acquisition, Fella began their first production of mowers, tedders and rakes mainly for grain production.

In 1954, there was the introduction of Jupiter, a self-propelled combine harvester. This harvester was very modern and advanced for the time, being able to work through not only one, but many different types of grain. In 1966, Fella added yet another product to their line: silos. In the 1980s, and 1990s, Fella really began to focus on their forage product range. They kept a large product range, but focused on advancing in the forage harvesting industry.

Fella has still been making technical innovations in the field with the world’s largest mounted disc mower (working width: 33.92 feet (10.34 m)), the 36.09-foot (11.00 m) and 42.65-foot (13 m) tedders, and the TS 40000 rake.

== Present ==
AGCO GmbH is still located in Feucht, Germany. The present product range is focused on forage harvest implements: mowers, tedders, and rakes. AGCO is still known for having the largest forage harvesting product range, as well as professional sized machinery.

== Management ==
AGCO also went through many management changes; in 1988, there was a management buy-out where Peter Timmermann became the managing director and in 1999, Timmermann sold the company to a Dutch investing group (Netagco) who invested heavily in Fella. Netagco invested specifically in upgrading the old buildings as well as building a new assembly hall and a more modern office building.

In 2004, Fella was acquired by ARGO, who decided that their subsidiary company, Laverda, would become the parent company of Fella. In 2007, it became necessary for ARGO to sell 50% of Laverda. They sold that 50% to AGCO and in late 2010, AGCO announced its intentions to buy the remaining shares of Laverda, thereby purchasing Fella-Werke GmbH as well. This purchase was finalized in March 2011.

== Current machinery range ==
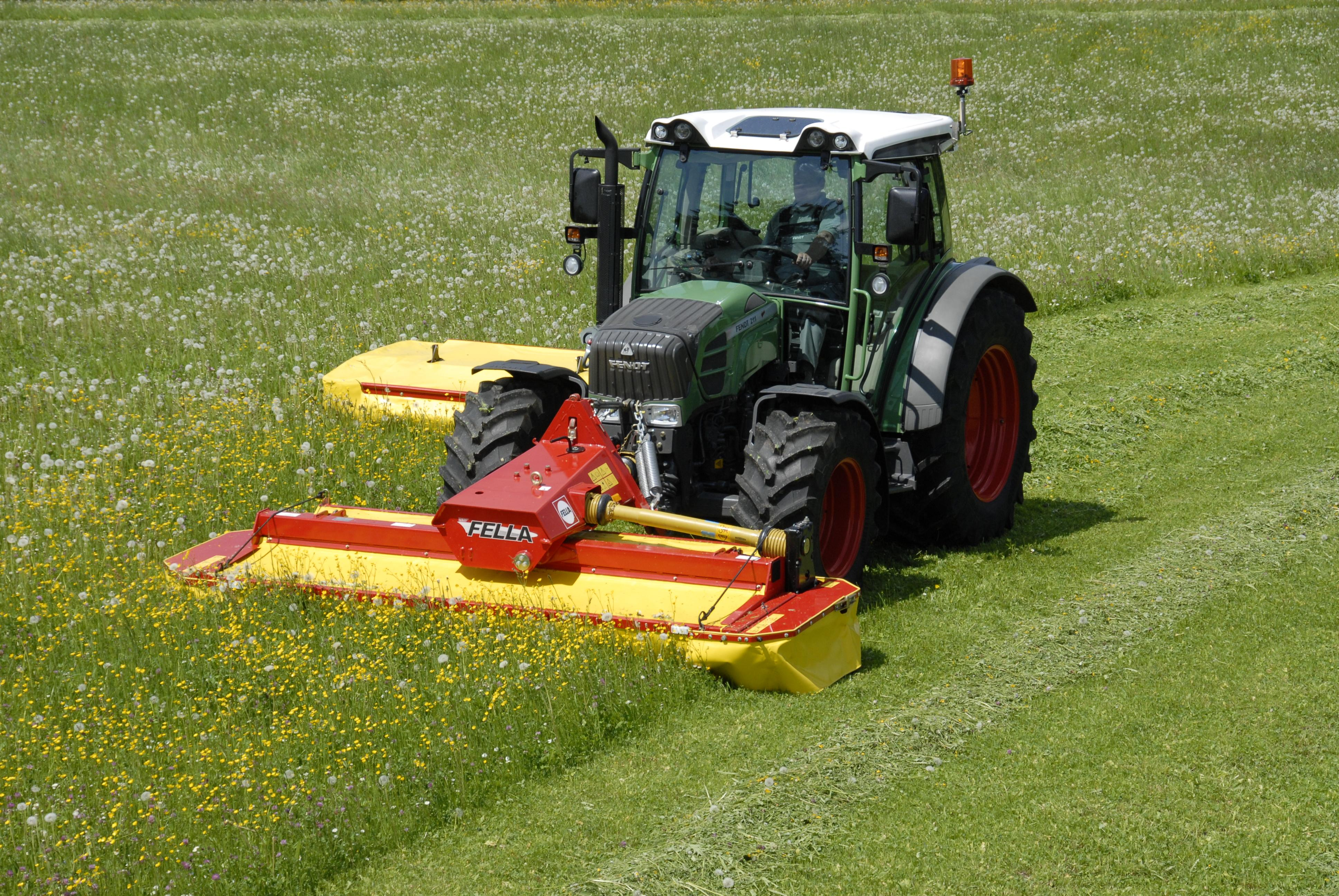
Fendt tractor with Fella mowers

AGCO currently offers drum mowers, disc mowers, mowers, tedders and rakes including conditioners and other attachments.

The drum mowers come from 5.41 to 10.04 ft (1.65 to 3.06 m) for a single mower. Disc mowers, on the other hand, come with a working width of 5.45 to 30.51 ft (1.66 to 9.30 m). These come with several different options; tine or roller conditioners as well as a conveyor belt to form a swath immediately after mowing.

Currently, Fella has the largest tedder on the market; the TH 1800 Hydro is a 57.41-foot (17.50 m) tedder. There are also small attachments for alpine tractors, TH 400 DS Hydro, which is 13.12 ft (4.00 m).

Rakes include an 11.15 ft (3.40 m) TS 301 DS as the smallest alpine machine, and the TS 4000 which has a working width of 41.01 ft (12.50 m)). There are several different patents and innovations here, one being the ‘jet effect’.

== Manufacturing plant ==
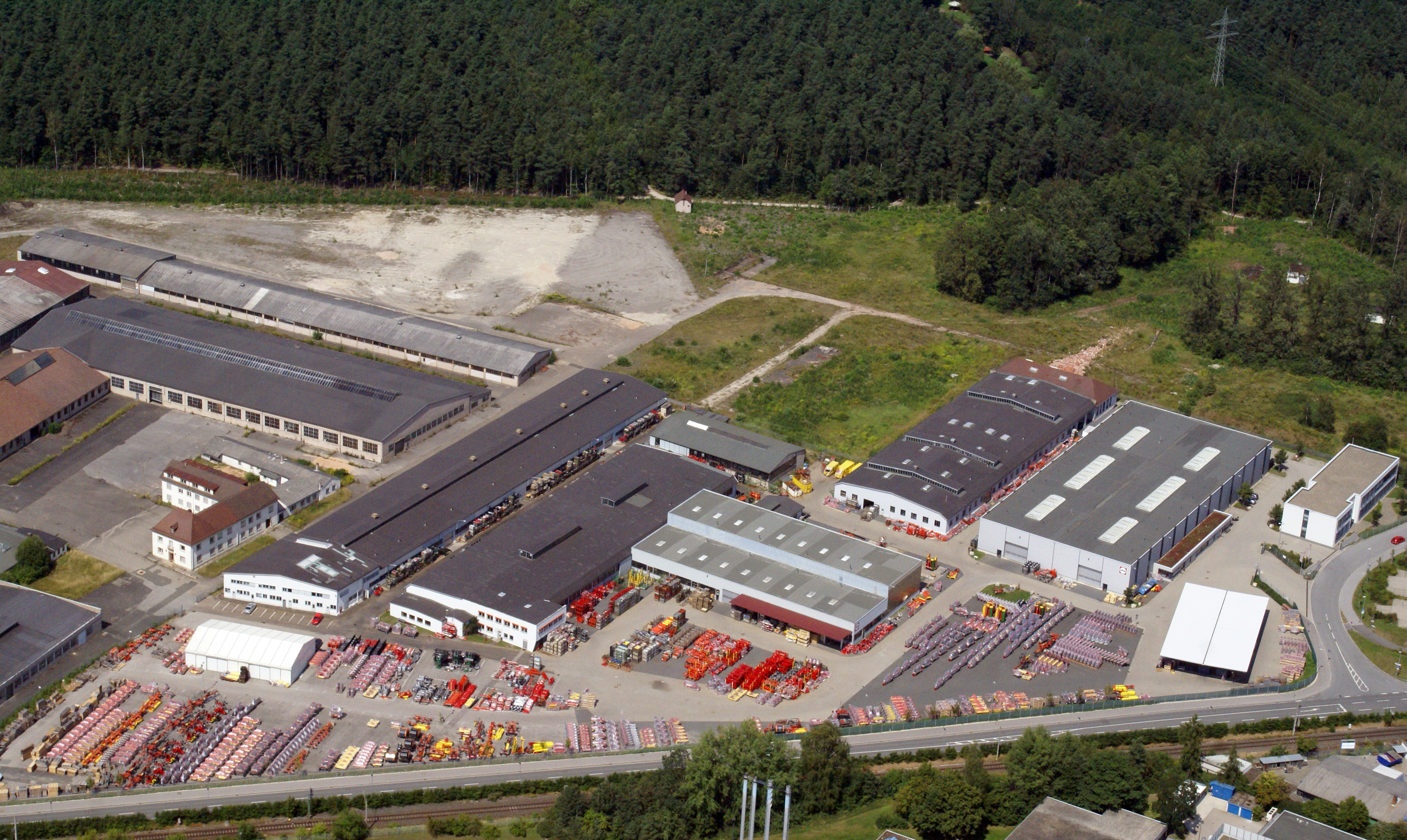
AGCO manufacturing plant in Feucht, Germany, 2010

Since the founding of Fella in 1918, the property size has grown and decreased in size. In the beginning Fella was approximately 9.3 acres (3.8 ha) and at one point grew to be approximately 43.46 acres (17.59 ha). At its current size, Fella is 11.37 acres (4.60 ha) with five separate buildings.

In 1997, Fella brought in a new concept to the way their manufacturing plant was set up. The decision was made to create four self-governing buildings. Each of these buildings would be responsible for its own machine type: one building for drum mowers, one for disc mowers, one for tedders, and one for rakes. There would be two responsible managers for the factory workers as well as the production requirements and plant management. Because of these modifications that helped increase productivity, and improve flexibility and quality, Fella won the 1998 International Best Factory Award.
