= Fellers (surname) =

Fellers is a surname. Notable people with the surname include:

- Bonner Fellers (1896–1973), American general in World War II
- Carl R. Fellers (1893–1960), American food scientist and microbiologist
- Rich Fellers (born 1959), American equestrian
