= Wuzheng =

Chinese car manufacturing company

Shandong Wuzheng Group Co., LTD.
- Type: Private
- Industry: Automotive industry
- Founded: 1961
- Headquarters: Rizhao, Shandong, China
- Key people: Jiang Weidong
- Products: Commercial vehicles Truck
- Brands: Wuzheng; WOW; Feidi Motors
- Revenue: ▲2.3 billion USD (2012)
- Number of employees: 14,000
- Subsidiaries: Zhejiang Feidi Motors Manufacturing Co., Ltd.
- Website: https://www.wuzheng.com

Shandong Wuzheng Group Co., LTD (Wuzheng or Wuzheng Group, 山東五征集團有限公司) is a commercial vehicles and agricultural machinery manufacturing company registered in China. Their headquarters are located in Shandong, Rizhao.

Wuzheng Group was the county tractor station, in 2000 it became a private company. In 2012, Wuzheng Group had a revenue of US$2.3 billion.

== History ==
- 1962, Wulian tractor station was found.
- 1984, Changed name to Wulian general machine shop.
- 1995, First exported to overseas.
- 2005, Changed name to "Wuzheng Group", acquired "Zhejiang UFO Automobile Manufacturing Co., Ltd." (Feidi Motors).
- In 2009, the "Wuzheng" trademark was recognized as a "Well-known Chinese Trademark" by the State Administration for Industry and Commerce.
- 2016, WAW brand launching.

== Farming vehicles ==
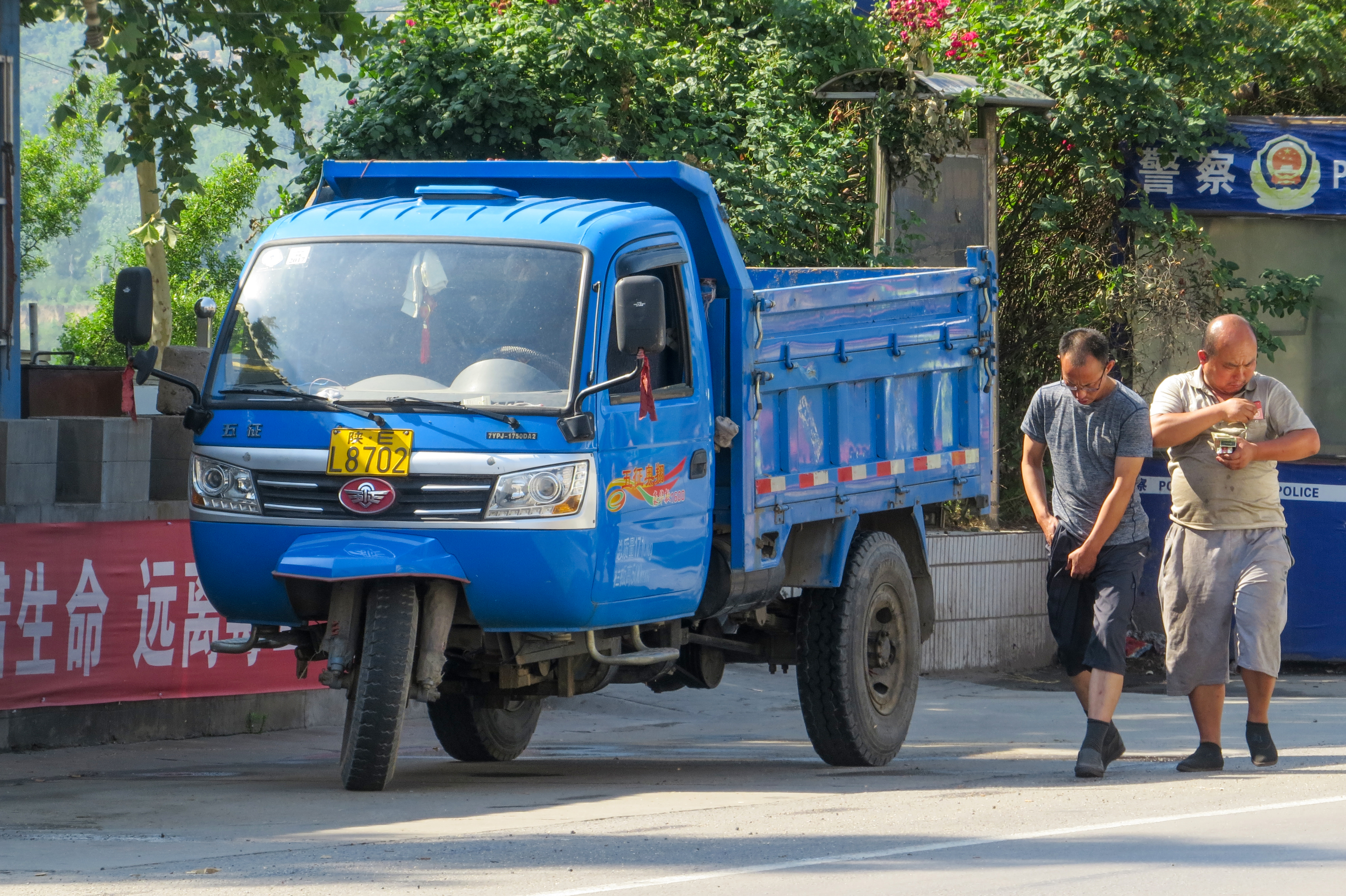
A Wuzheng three-wheeled truck in Ruicheng County, Shanxi, China in 2017.

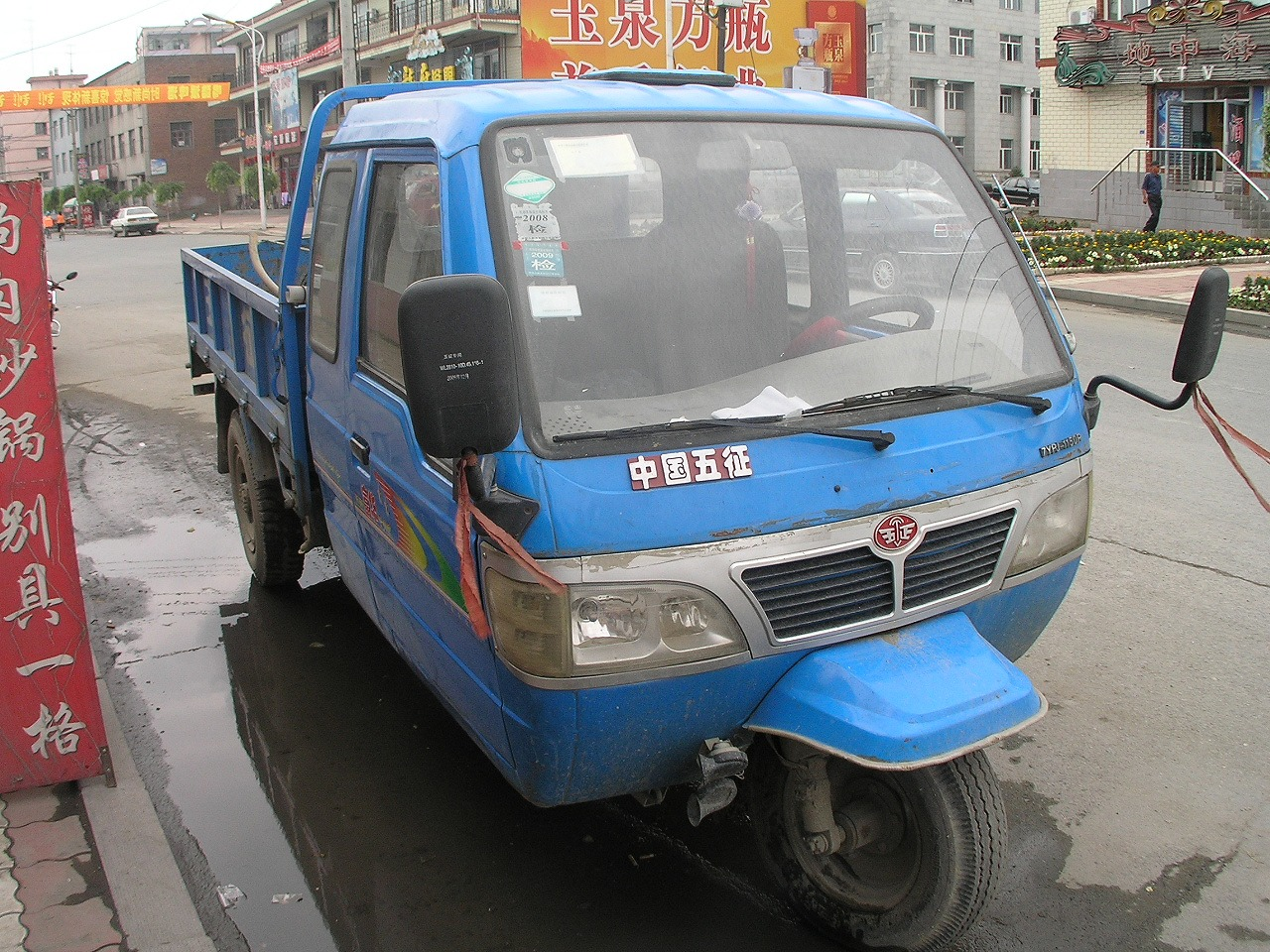
Close-up view of the cab.

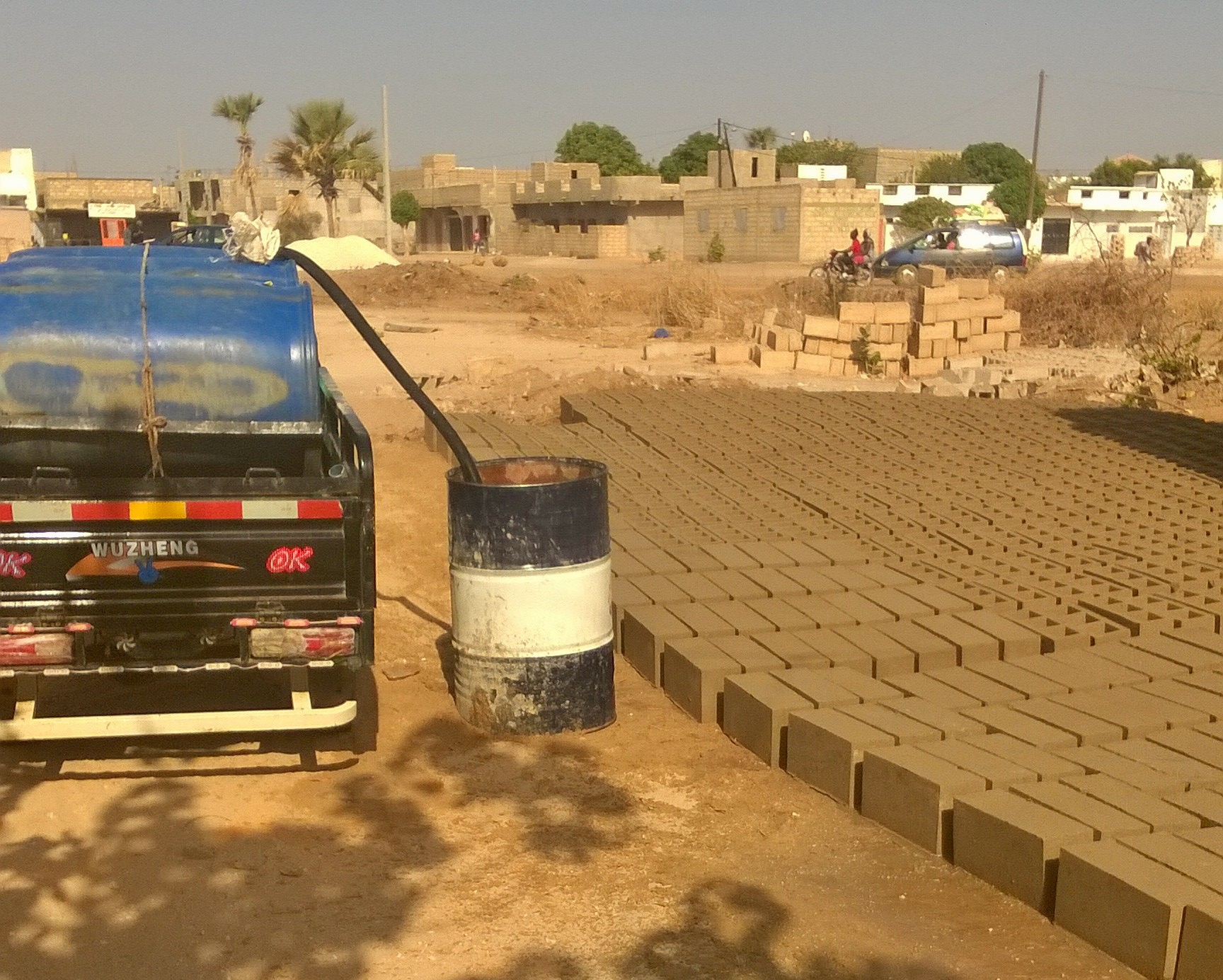
A Wuzheng three-wheeled truck in Senegal in 2020.

== Feidi Motors ==
Originally branded as Wuzheng-Feidi (WAW), Feidi Motors (Pronounced as Feidie in Chinese, 飞碟) is a light commercial vehicles brand of Wuzheng Group, particularly known for its diverse range of trucks, including fuel-powered and electric models. The brand also offer solutions for various applications, from urban delivery to specialized uses like waste management and refrigeration. Key Features and Models:

- Feidi Dito: Light truck series designed for short-distance transportation in urban and rural areas, with a focus on urban delivery and secondary distribution. The electric version was introduced as the EF3 in Europe.
- Feidi W Series (W5, W7): A regular duty trucks with more safety and efficiency, incorporating features like hydraulic suspension, a keyless entry system, and an SOS button. The W5 is designed with "Fluid Dynamics" principles and is aimed at the high-end market in urban areas. The W7 features a high-strength steel chassis and a robust rear axle. The electric version was introduced as the EW5 in Europe.
- Feidi Aochi: A regular duty truck series designed with shorter wheelbases to navigate narrow roads, particularly in Southeast Asian countries like Vietnam.
- Feidi Q and U series: A micro van (U series) and micro truck (Q series) series focuses on noise and vibration control, making it suitable for eco-friendly petroleum production. The electric version was introduced as the Compact E-Van in Euroupe. Feidi also offers a range of special duty variants, such as the Feidi Q2 Mini Electric Freezer Truck.
- Feidi U6: Light commercial van based on the Karry Porpoise
- E-Trike 3MX: Light logistics tricycle truck.
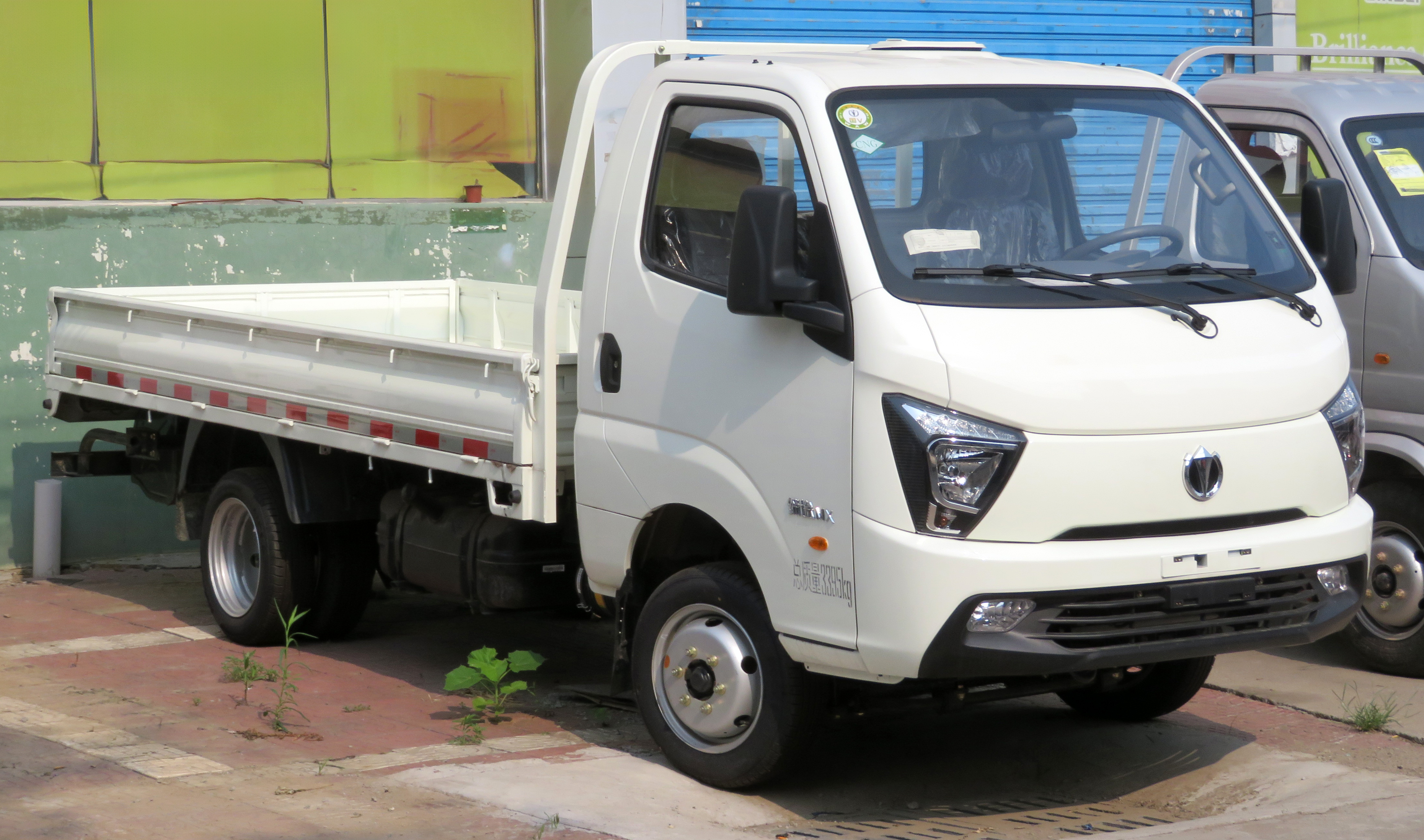
Feidi Dito DX

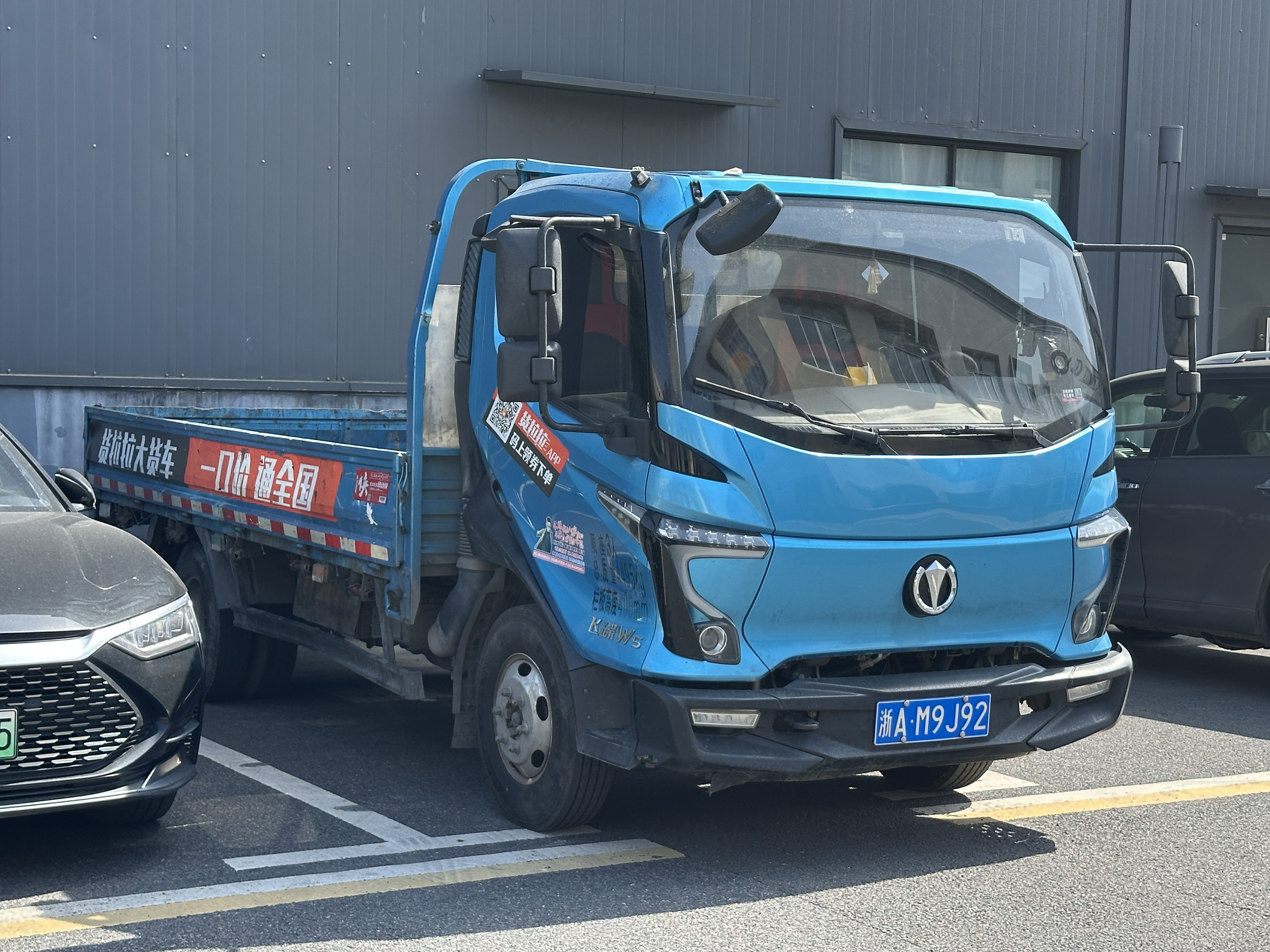
Feidi W series (W5)

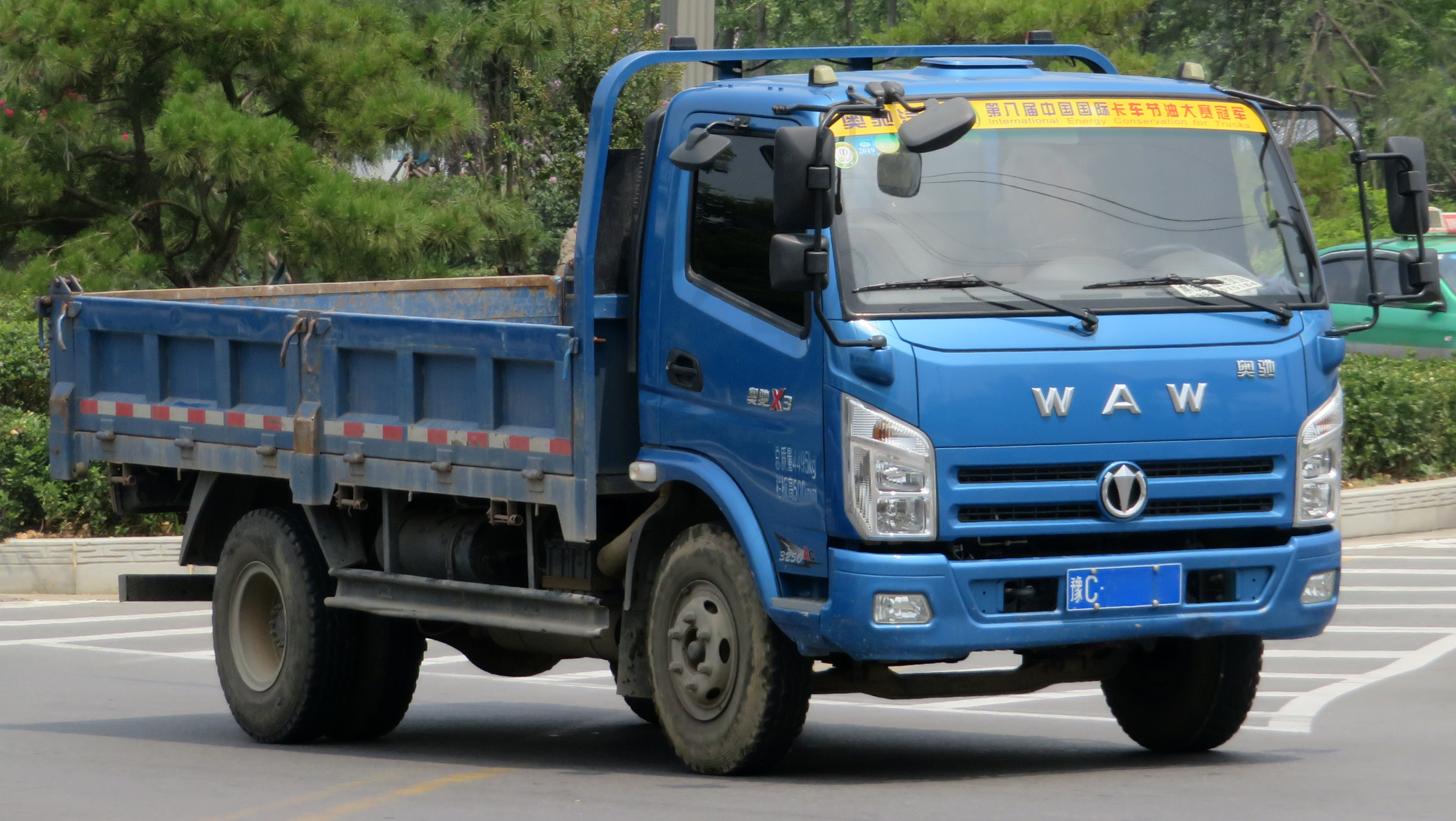
Feidi Aochi (Aochi X3)

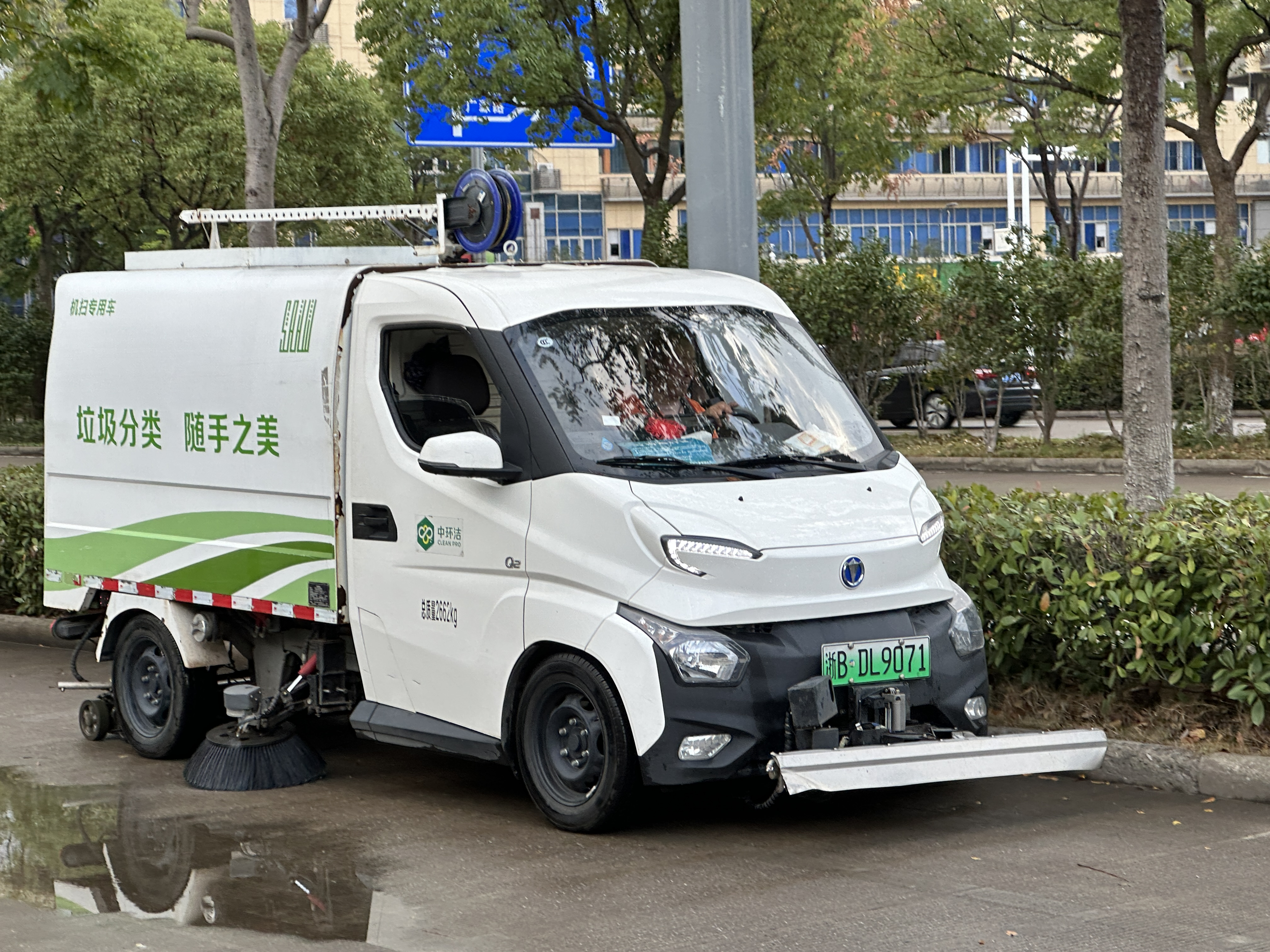
Feidi Q series (Q2T street sweeping vehicle)

Feidi Q series (Q3 box truck)
