= Rose Feller =

Hungarian artist

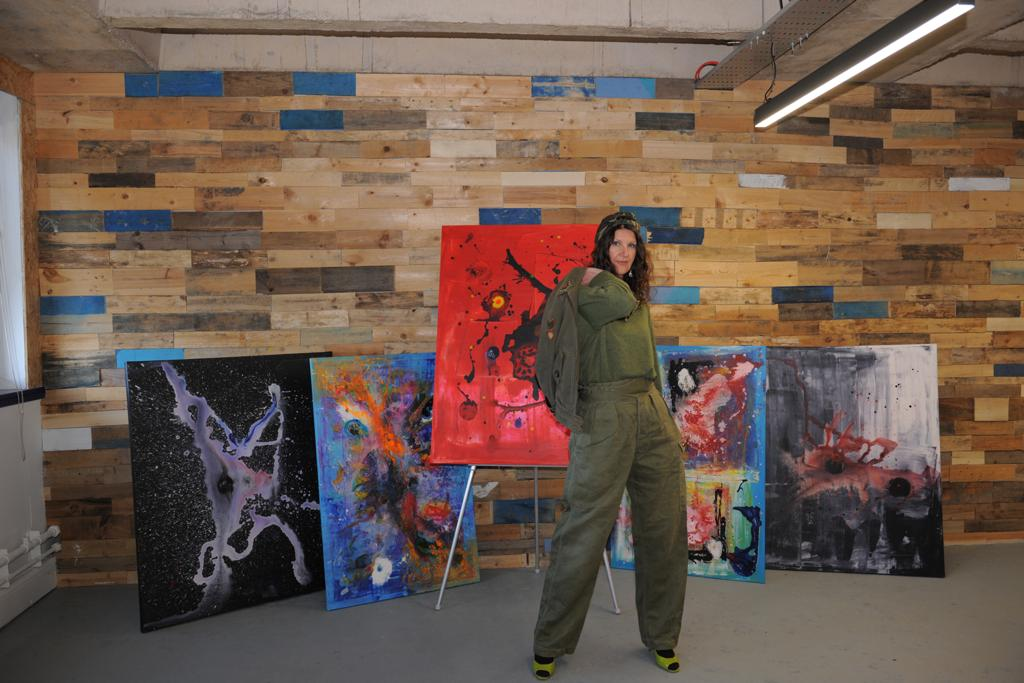
Rose Feller is in the atelier.

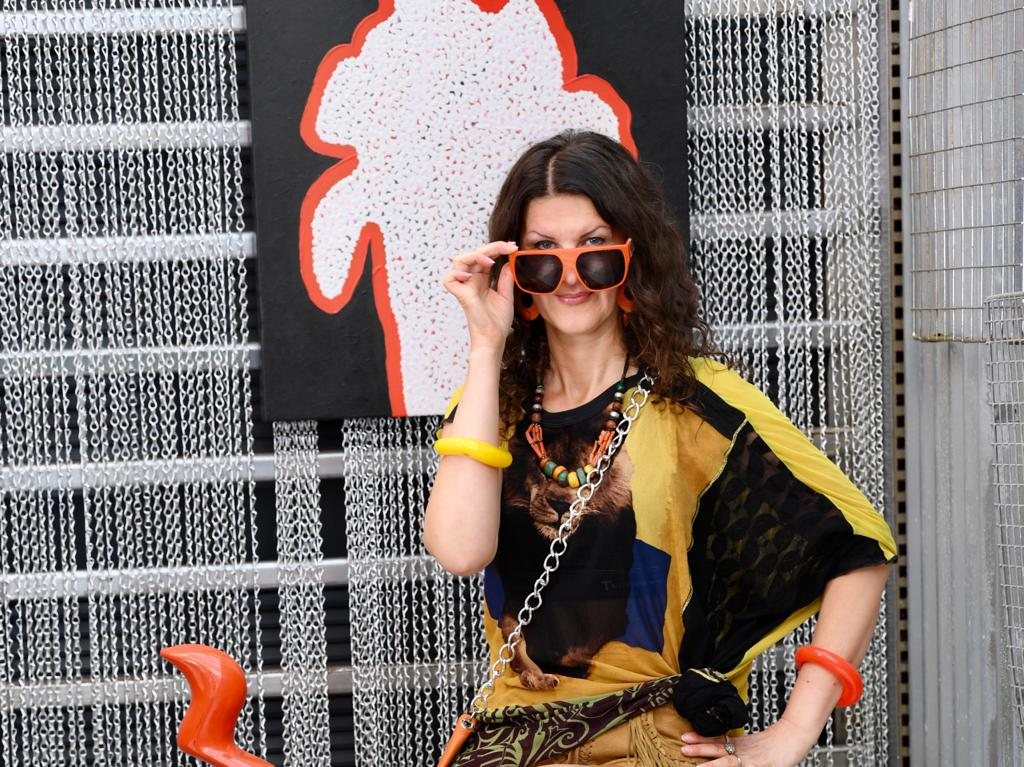
Rose Feller

Rose Feller also known as Rózsa Szűcs (born 1975) is a Hungarian maximalist artist, who works with multimedia and recycled material.

== Biography ==
Whilst living in Hungary, Feller painted traditional works in an eighteenth century style using oil paints. Since coming to the UK she has found artistic freedom, initially experimenting with surrealistic and abstract art, and now concentrating on abstract and AI art. Feller came to the UK in 2008 to escape an abusive relationship where she was stifled in her artistic expression. She initially moved to London and is now living in Gloucester. Feller is a self-taught artist and it is only since travelling to the UK she started to study formally. In 2017, she completed an Art and Design Foundation Diploma, and in 2018 commenced a Fine Art Degree at the University of Gloucestershire.

== Exhibitions ==
2018 - Gloucester City Museum – solo exhibition

2018 - Debenhams, Gloucester – Contributing artist

2019 - Saatchi Art Gallery

== Multimedia ==
Feller uses as much as 80 per cent recycled material in her multi-media projects. These include found objects, food waste (such as egg shells), rubbish, glass from car accidents and dead animals.

She aspires to create in a way which pushes the boundaries, create work which no one else can with material that others don’t use.

Her work has an unconscious element to it, with no real objective other than to express herself as she is at one particular moment.

The use of dead animals including mice and fish is presented as a memorial to them – they are part of the natural world and should be honoured and respected.

== AI art ==
In 2019 Feller started exploring AI Art where she is creating through the technology of artificial intelligence and computer learning to produce work which represents her dreams.

This is something she is passionate about and wants to explore this field further until she is eventually able to teach the computer to produce art organically.

One project she is working on through AI art is one about changing perceptions of beauty. She hopes to encourage people to look at inner beauty rather than the outer shell.

Although it is possible to apply her healing abilities with AI art she feels the project does this organically anyway by healing the mind, connecting everyone’s hearts and seeing the true beauty within.
