= Daedong (company) =

South Korean tractor company

Daedong Corporation
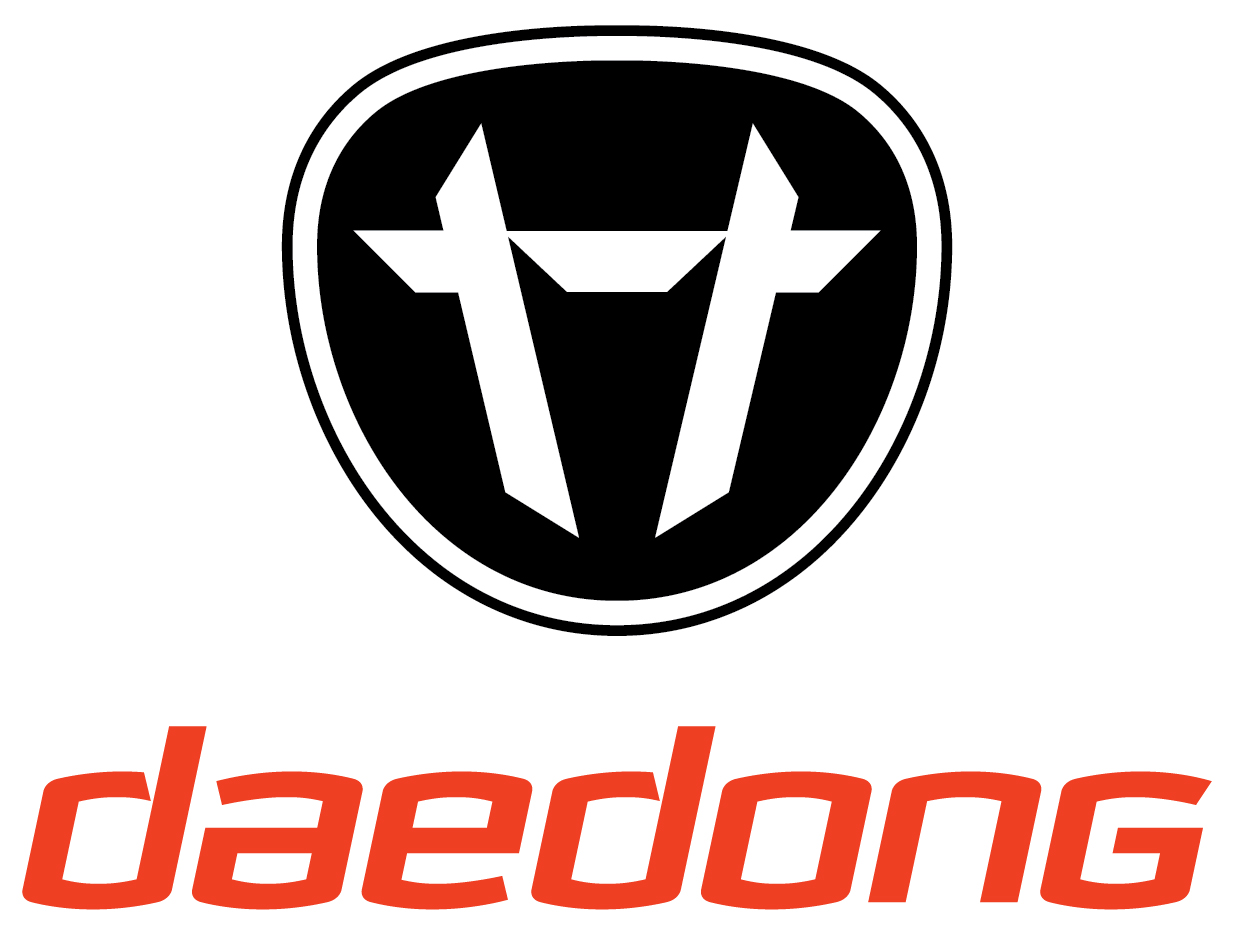
- Native name: 주식회사 대동
- Type: Public
- Traded as: KRX: 000490
- Industry: Agricultural machinery
- Founded: May 20, 1947; 79 years ago
- Headquarters: Daegu, South Korea
- Area served: Worldwide
- Key people: Kim Joon-Sik; Chairman & CEO
- Products: Tractors; Combines; Forage equipment Seeding & Tillage equipment Diesel engines
- Revenue: KRW 895.7 billion (FY 2020)
- Website: https://www.daedong.co.kr https://www.kioti.com

Kioti logo

Daedong Corporation, also known by the brand name Kioti in North America, is a South Korean agricultural machinery manufacturer founded in 1947 and headquartered in Daegu, South Korea. Its main products include tractors, combine harvesters, all-terrain utility vehicles and engines.

== History ==
Daedong began operations as a metal casting company but soon shifted its focus to agricultural machinery. In 1949, the company produced Korea's first engine. This was followed by introducing Korea's first plow in 1962 and the production of Korea's first tractor in 1968.

In 1971, Daedong produced Korea's first combine harvester, a piece of machinery that improved agricultural efficiency. The company entered the U.S. market in 1982. In 1983, Daedong achieved another milestone by developing and producing multi-cylinder engines using its in-house technology. By 1985, they exported their first tractors. Kioti USA was formed in 1993.

This move allowed for future expansion in the North American market. The company was formerly known as Daedong Industrial Co., Ltd. and changed its name to Daedong Corporation in March 2021.

== Kioti Tractor ==
Kioti Tractor (/kaɪˈoʊti/ "coyote") is the trade name for Daedong tractors in U.S. and other markets.

== Product range ==
- Tractors
- Farm implements
- Attachments
- Zero-turn Mowers
- Rice transplanters
- Combine harvesters
- All-terrain vehicles
- Skid-steer loaders
- Engines
- Utility Vehicles (UTVs)

== See also ==
- List of tractor manufacturers
