= Millat Tractors =

Tractor company in Pakistan

Millat Tractors Limited
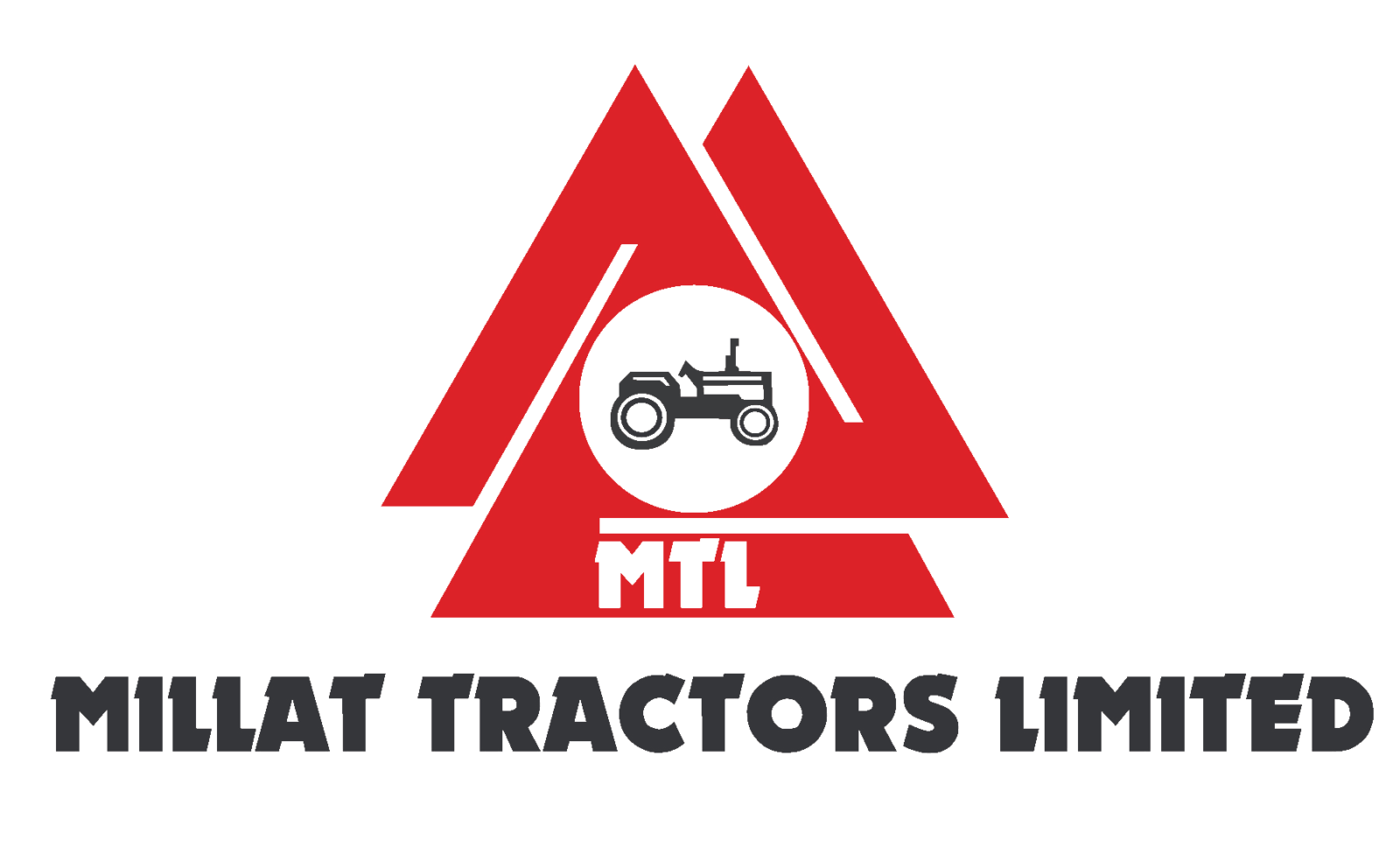
- Native name: ملت ٹریکٹرز
- Formerly: Rana Tractors and Equipment Limited (1964–1972)
- Company type: Public
- Traded as: PSX: MTL; KSE 100 component KSE 30 component
- Industry: Agricultural machinery
- Founded: 1964; 62 years ago
- Founders: Rana Khudadad Khan; Rana Allahdaad Khan
- Headquarters: Lahore, Pakistan
- Area served: Pakistan
- Key people: Raheel Asghar (CEO); Sikandar Mustafa Khan (chairman)
- Products: Tractors
- Revenue: ▼ Rs. 52.108 billion (US$190 million) (2025)
- Operating income: ▼ Rs. 10.236 billion (US$37 million) (2025)
- Net income: ▼ Rs. 6.372 billion (US$23 million) (2025)
- Total assets: ▲ Rs. 32.988 billion (US$120 million) (2025)
- Total equity: ▼ Rs. 8.076 billion (US$29 million) (2025)
- Number of employees: 464 (2025)
- Subsidiaries: TIPEG Intertrade DMCC (75%); Millat Industrial Products Limited (64.09%); Bolan Castings Limited (46.26%); Millat Equipment Limited (45%); Hyundai Nishat Motors (15.86%)
- Website: millat.com.pk
- Footnotes / references Financials as of 30 June 2025

Millat Tractors Limited (Urdu pronunciation: [ˈmɪl.lət ˈtræk.tərz] MIL-lut) is a Pakistani agricultural machinery manufacturer based in Lahore, Punjab, Pakistan. Founded in 1964, it is the manufacturer of Massey Ferguson tractors in Pakistan with a production capacity of 40,000.

It is one of the two major tractor manufacturers of Pakistan with a 70 percent market share, as compared to Al-Ghazi Tractors which had 29 percent market share in 2021.

== History ==
Millat Tractors Limited was founded as Rana Tractors and Equipment Limited in 1964 by Rana Khudadad Khan and Rana Allahdaad Khan. It became an importer and marketer of Massey Ferguson tractors in Pakistan. The company initially imported tractors as completely built units (CBU) but transitioned to assembling them from semi knocked-down (SKD) kits by 1967, due to transportation and cost efficiencies.

In 1965, Rana Tractors was listed on the Karachi Stock Exchange.

In 1972, following the nationalization of key industries by the Government of Pakistan, Rana Tractors was renamed Millat Tractors and incorporated into the Pakistan Tractor Corporation (PTC), facilitating the assembly of tractors from completely knocked down (CKD) kits. The first engine assembly line in Pakistan was developed by Millat Tractors in 1982, although the company faced difficulties in procuring cast and machined parts. This led to the establishment of casting facilities at vendor sites in 1984 and an in-house machining facility for essential engine and axle components.

In 1992, Millat Tractors was acquired by the employees of the company for PKR 305.97 million (US$ 12.49 million) under the privatization scheme. Subsequently, a tractor assembly plant was established capable of producing 15,000 tractors annually in a single shift.

In 1993, Millat Tractors acquired a 51 percent stake in Bolan Casting Limited, enhancing its casting capabilities for automotive parts. The following year, it established Millat Equipment Limited to produce gears and shafts for tractors and other applications.

In 1999, Millat Industrial Products Limited was established to manufacture batteries and cells for the automotive and industrial markets.

In 2001, Millat Tractors acquired Rex Barren Batteries, a battery manufacturer based in Kasur, under the privatization scheme of the government of Pakistan.

By 2015, Millat Tractors had diversified its product range to include seven tractor models, various industrial products such as generators and fork lifts, and twenty-five types of agricultural implements.

In January 2023, due to continuous drop in demand for tractors and cashflow constraints, Millat Tractors suspended its plant operations till further notice.

In June 2024, an audit of Millat Tractors submitted to the Federal Tax Ombudsman imposed a penalty of Rs 5.41 billion on the company.

== Products ==
- Agricultural tractors
- Diesel engines
- Diesel generating sets and prime movers
- Forklift trucks, under license from Anhui Heli
- Agricultural implements

== Recognition ==
Millat Tractors, as a company, is on the Forbes List of Asia's 200 Best Under a Billion (2018)
