= Argo (Italian company) =

Italian agricultural machinery company

ARGO SpA
- Company type: Holding company
- Industry: Agricultural machinery
- Founded: 1980; 46 years ago
- Founder: Valerio Morra
- Headquarters: Fabbrico, Province of Reggio Emilia, Emilia-Romagna, Italy
- Area served: Worldwide
- Products: Tractors, combine harvesters
- Brands: Landini; Laverda; McCormick; Valpadana; S.E.P. Pegoraro
- Owner: Morra family
- Website: www.argotractors.com

Argo stylized as ARGO is a family-owned Italian holding company owned by the Morra family that manufactures agricultural machinery. Founded by Valerio Morra in 1980, the company is based in Fabbrico, Emilia-Romagna, Italy. Argo's main products are tractors and combine harvesters.

== History ==
It was founded by Valerio Morra in 1980 with his purchase of the company MBS Spa.

In 1987, Argo purchased Pegoraro Spa of Vicenza. Sixty-six percent of Landini was purchased in 1989 from Massey Ferguson, with additional shares purchased in 1994. In 1995, the tractor business was expanded with the purchase of Valpadana Spa, followed by S.E.P. Spa and Laverda in 2000 from CNH Global. S.E.P. manufactures small, specialty tractors and equipment, while Laverda manufactures combines and hay-equipment. The remaining 9% of Landini that was owned by AGCO was purchased by Argo in 2000.

2001 saw further growth with the purchase of the McCormick Tractors name and tractor factory in Doncaster, England, after the merger of Case IH and Fiat's New Holland Ag into CNH Global. The regulatory bodies after reviewing the merger required some factories to be sold, which included Laverda from Fiat, and McCormick Tractors International from Case IH.

2007 saw Argo selling 50% of Laverda to AGCO. AGCO bought the remaining 50% of Laverda in late 2010/early 2011, thereby also acquiring Fella-Werke.

== Brands ==
Argo manufactures or distributes the following brands of agricultural machinery:

- Landini (tractor)
- Laverda (harvesters)
- McCormick Tractors
- Valpadana
- S.E.P.
- Pegoraro

== See also ==
- List of Italian companies
