= Landini (tractor) =

Italian agricultural machinery manufacturer

Landini SpA
- Company type: Subsidiary
- Industry: Agricultural machinery
- Founded: 1884
- Founder: Giovanni Landini
- Headquarters: Fabbrico, Province of Reggio Emilia, Emilia-Romagna, Italy
- Number of locations: 4 plants
- Area served: Worldwide
- Key people: Valerio Morra (Argo President)
- Products: Tractors
- Revenue: Approx. €500 million (2013)
- Number of employees: Approx. 1600
- Parent: ARGO SpA
- Website: Official website

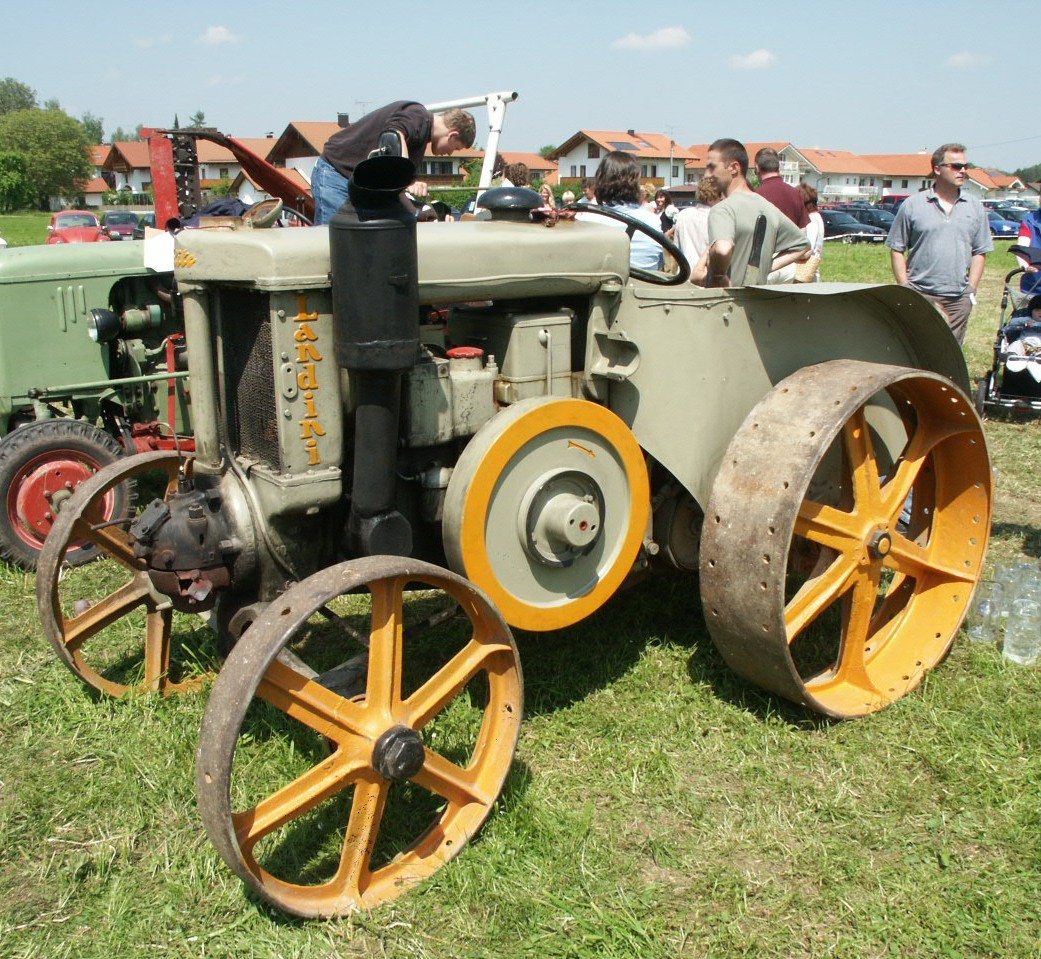
Landini VL30

Landini SpA, is an Italian agricultural machinery manufacturer. The company designs and builds tractors. The company was founded by Giovanni Landini in 1884 in Fabbrico, Italy. Landini had just started making tractors in 1925, when Giovanni died preventing the completion of the first prototype tractor. Giovanni Landini's sons took over the business and saw the completion of the tractor project.

== Early models ==
In 1925, the sons built the first authentic Italian tractor, a 30 hp machine. It was a success and was the forerunner of the viable range of Landini 40 and 50 hp models which appeared in the mid-1930s and were to become renowned under the names of Velite, Bufalo, and Super. The first production tractors were powered by a 40 hp semi-diesel engine which was a two stroke single-cylinder unit. The company continued to produce semi-diesel engined tractors until 1957. When World War II started, the production stopped.

== Diversification ==
In 1959, the first Landini crawler tractor, the C35, was manufactured, and the company was purchased 100% by Massey Ferguson. In 1973, Landini launched the 500 Series of 2 and 4 wheeled tractors. 1980 saw the company diversifying its products as well as specializing. Also in 1980, Landini started work on a vineyard tractor. In 1986, the new vineyard tractor was launched. In 1988, the company launched a redesigned series of tractors, the 60, 70, 80 Series.

== Takeover ==
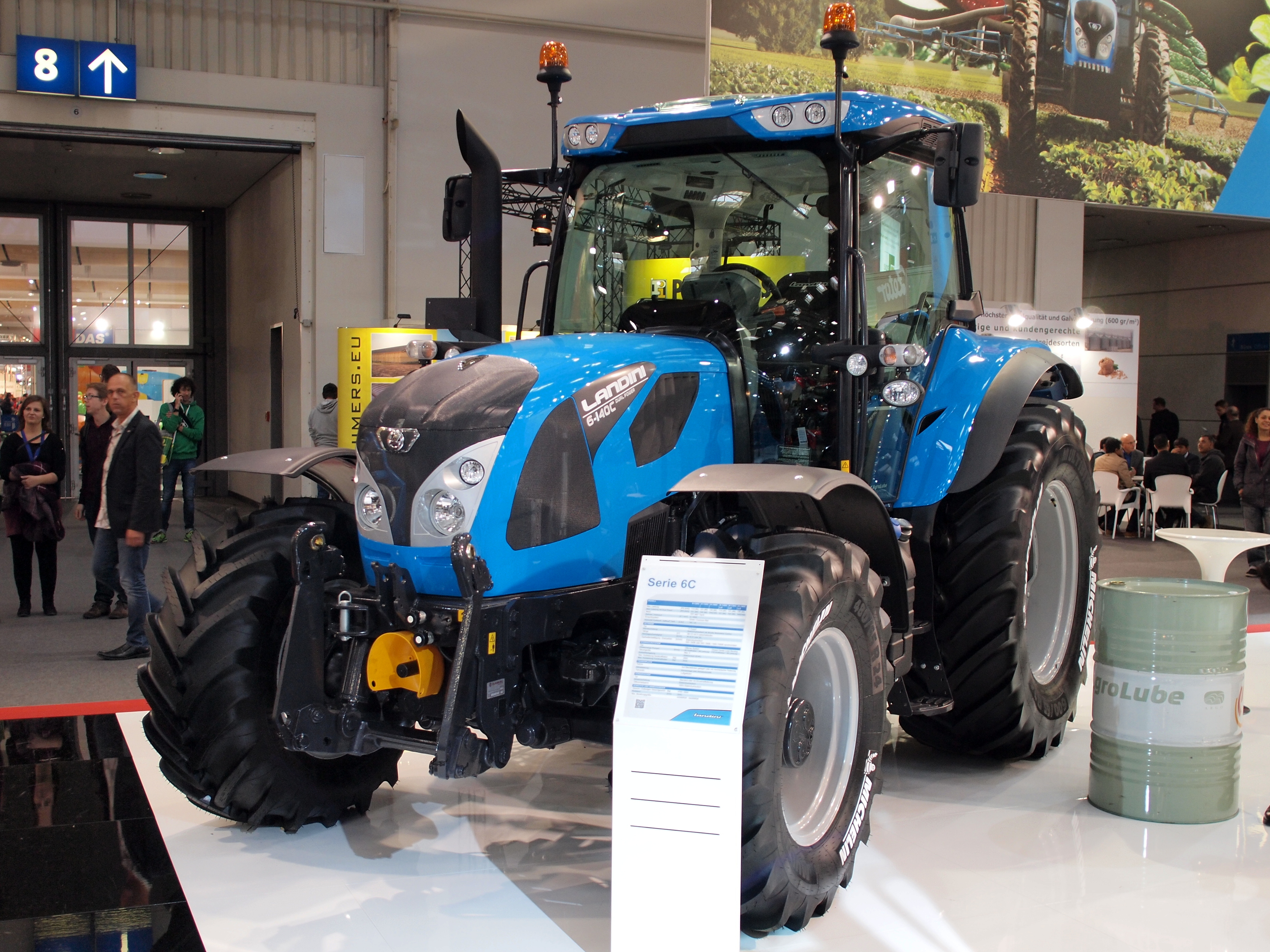
Model 6-140C from 2015

In 1989, Landini became a part of ARGO SpA as Massey Ferguson sold 66% of the company. Massey itself was bought by AGCO in 1994, while ARGO purchased more shares of Landini that year. The final 9% of Landini that was owned by AGCO was bought by ARGO in 2000. Landini/ARGO continued supplying some tractors to AGCO under a supply agreement.

== See also ==
- ARGO SpA
- McCormick Tractors
- Valpadana
- List of Italian companies
- List of tractor manufacturers
