= Fabbrico =

- Comune
- Comune di Fabbrico
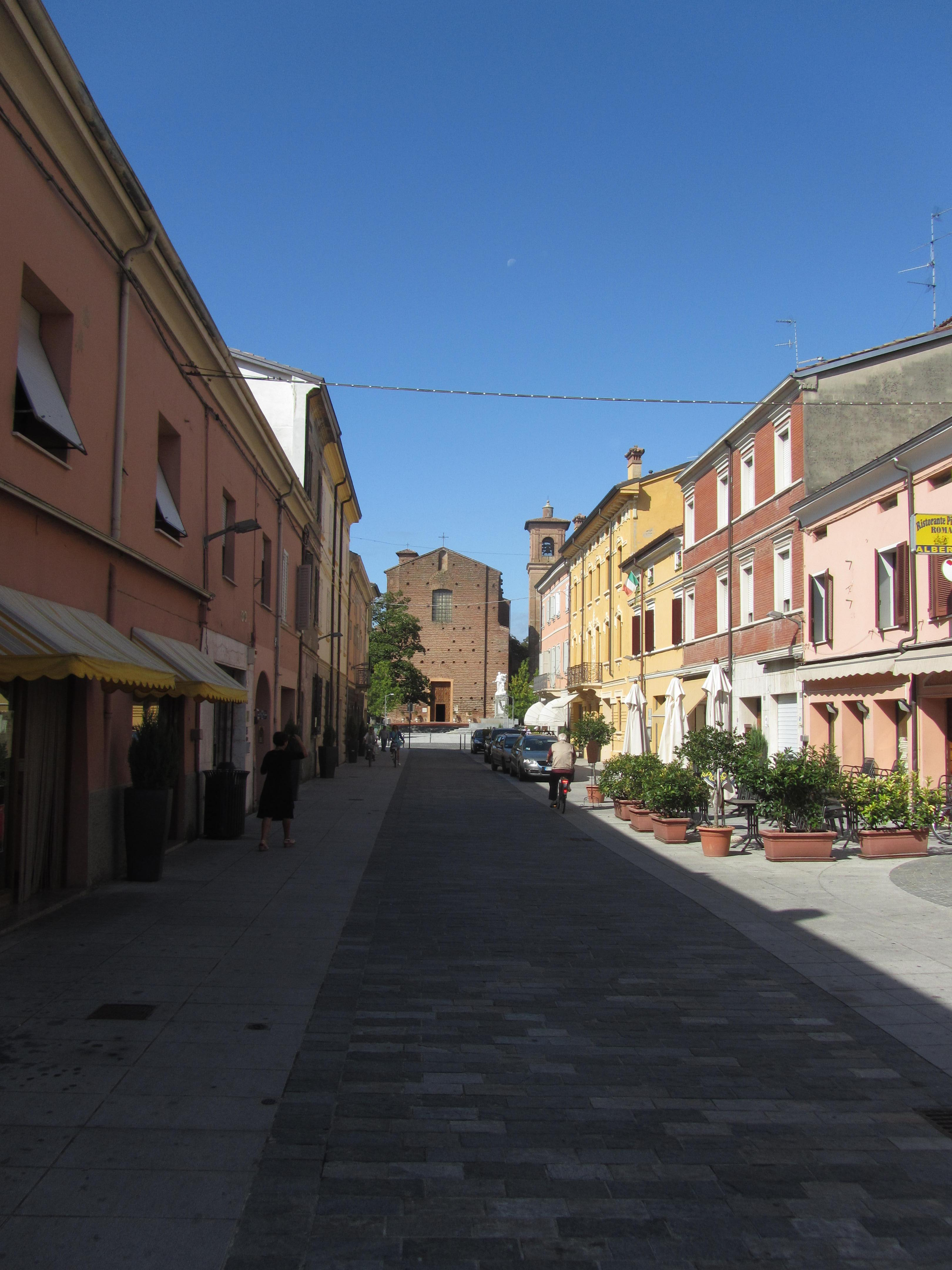
- View of Fabbrico

- Location within Italy Location within Emilia-Romagna
- Coordinates: 44°52′N 10°48′E
- Country: Italy
- Region: Emilia-Romagna
- Province: Reggio Emilia (RE)
- Frazioni: Ponte Bisciolino, Rifugio, Quattro Formagge, Righetta, San Genesio

Government
  - Mayor: Maurizio Terzi

Area
  - Total: 23.63 km^{2} (9.12 sq mi)

Population (31 December 2021)
  - Total: 6,620
  - Density: 280/km^{2} (726/sq mi)
- Demonym: Fabbricesi
- Time zone: UTC+1 (CET)
  - Summer (DST): UTC+2 (CEST)
- Postal code: 42042
- Dialing code: 0522
- Website: Official website

Fabbrico (Reggiano: Fâbrich or Fâvrich; locally Fàvregh) is a comune (municipality) in the Province of Reggio Emilia in the Italian region Emilia-Romagna, located about 60 kilometres (37 mi) northwest of Bologna and about 25 kilometres (16 mi) northeast of Reggio Emilia.

Fabbrico borders the following municipalities: Campagnola Emilia, Carpi, Reggiolo, Rio Saliceto, Rolo.

== Economy ==
From 1934 to 1959 was built the agricultural tractor Super Landini, which achieved a great commercial success.
