= GoldStar =

1958–2002 South Korean electronics company

GoldStar Co., Ltd.
- Trade name: GoldStar
- Native name: 주식회사 금성사
- Romanized name: RR: Jusikhoesa Geumseong-sa
- Company type: Public
- Founded: 1958; 68 years ago
- Defunct: 2002; 24 years ago
- Fate: Split into LG EI and LG Electronics, then LG EI was merged into LG CI to form LG Corporation.
- Successor: Legal successor merged into LG Corp, business divisions spun off into a new LG Electronics.

GoldStar was a South Korean electronics company established in 1958. The corporate name was changed to LG Electronics and LG Cable on February 28, 1995, after merging with Lucky Chemical. LG Cable was spun off from LG Electronics and changed its name to LS Cable in 2005.

== Manufacturing ==
GoldStar manufactured a wide variety of products, including radios, televisions, air conditioners, MSX home computers, LCD games, videocassette recorders, video and audio cassette tapes, microwave ovens, electronic typewriters, integrated circuits, escalators, elevators, injection molding machines, dehumidifiers, fans, and tractors. GoldStar televisions became a commonly sold brand of consumer television sets in the United States in the 1980s.

GoldStar Precision was a division manufacturing electronic test equipment such as multi-meters and oscilloscopes and industrial electronics. The name was changed to LG Precision with the merger, with many of the same products and model numbers being produced but with new branding. The measuring device division was acquired by EZ Digital in 1999, again with identical or similar model numbers. The industrial products continue under the company name LIG Nex1.

== Motors ==
GoldStar tractors began in 1975, as a division of Hyundai, in cooperation with Yanmar of Japan. In 1977, they began cooperation with Fiat of Italy, and in 1983, was acquired by GoldStar. Both companies, Lucky Chemicals and Goldstar Co. Ltd, merged and formed Lucky-Goldstar in this year. That same year, they began cooperation with Mitsubishi, and re-established cooperation with Fiat in 1984.

Tractors were sold under the GoldStar and Fiat-GoldStar brands. Fiat-GoldStar was a brand of tractors sold in cooperation with the Fiat company of Italy. The Fiat-GoldStar name was discontinued when GoldStar changed its corporate name to LG Cable.

== Other products ==
GoldStar also produced some models of computer monitors, optical disc drives and a model/version of multimedia videogame console 3DO, along with several manufacturers such as Sanyo, JVC or Samsung among others.

== See also ==
- LS Tractors
