= LS Electric =

South Korean manufacturing company

LS Electric Co., Ltd.

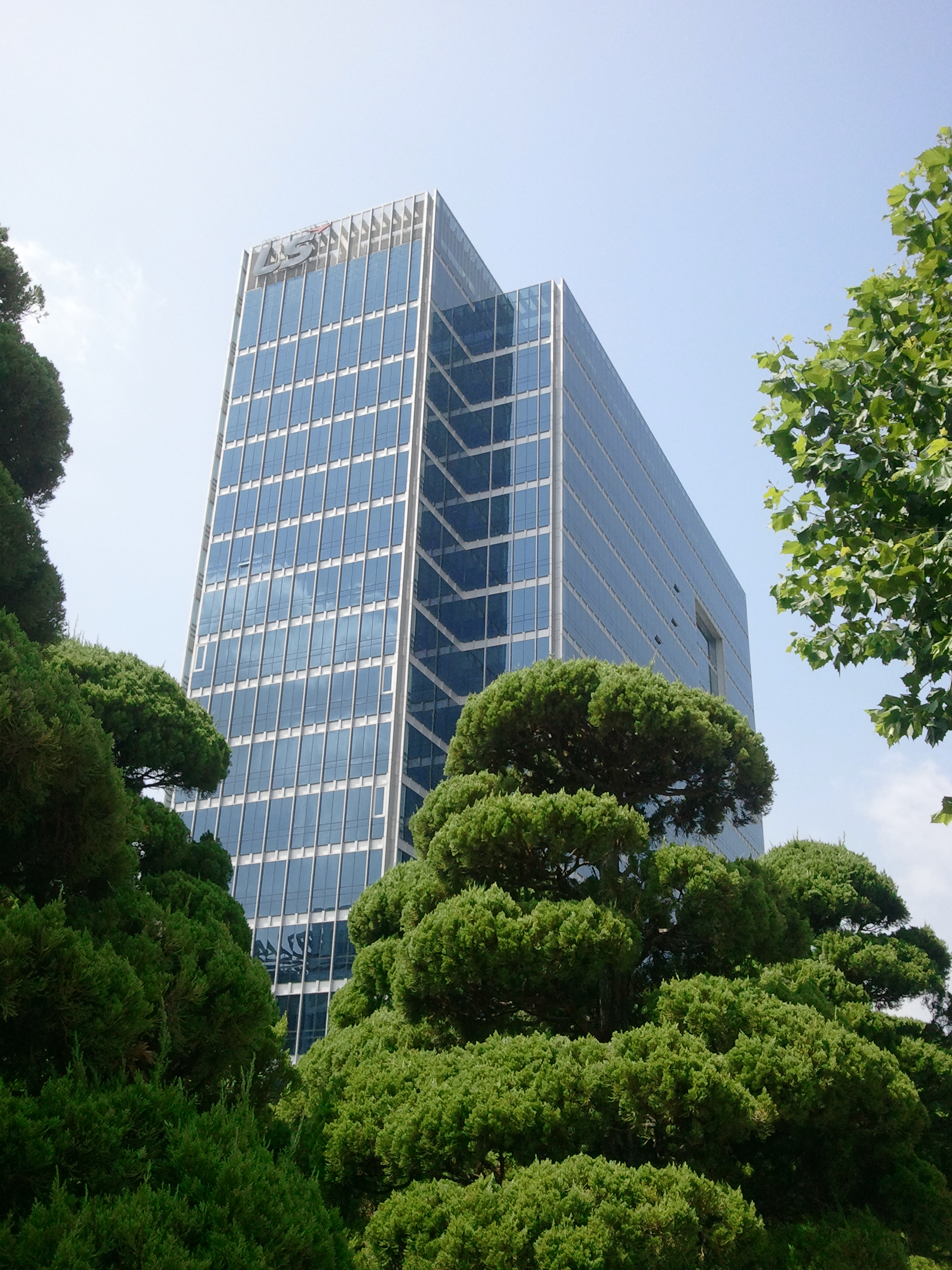
- LS Tower, the company's headquarters in Anyang
- Native name: 엘에스일렉트릭 주식회사
- Type: Public
- Traded as: KRX: 010120
- Founded: 1974; 52 years ago
- Headquarters: Anyang, South Korea
- Parent: LS Group
- Website: ls-electric.com

LS Electric Co., Ltd. (Korean: 엘에스일렉트릭 주식회사), formerly LS Industrial Systems (LSIS), is an electric power equipment and industrial automation company headquartered in Anyang, South Korea. LS Electric is one of the key affiliates of the LS Group, alongside LS Cable & System, and LS MnM.

LS Electric's major products include circuit breakers, transformers, cables, and switchgear.

== History ==
LS Electric was established in 1974 as Lucky Packing, a subsidiary of the Goldstar Group. In 1987, the company was renamed Goldstar Industrial Systems. Following the group's name change from Lucky-Goldstar Group to LG Group, the company became LG Industrial Systems in 1997.

The company formed a joint venture with Hitachi in the 1970s and introduced Korea's first high-rise building elevator at the 63 Building. In 1999, Hitachi sold its Korean business to Otis. In 2000, Otis merged with LG Industrial System's elevator business division, establishing LG-Otis Elevator.

In 2003, LG Group's electric wire and metal division spun off to form LS Group. The company became LS Industrial Systems (LSIS) in 2015 to align with the group's new name. In 2018, LSIS acquired the energy storage system (ESS) business of Parker Hannifin. Parker Hannifin's Energy Grid Tie (EGT) division subsequently became LSIS's new U.S. affiliate, LS Energy Solutions.

In 2020, the company adopted the name LS Electric to reflect its expansion into the electrical equipment business.
