= Mitsubishi Mahindra Agricultural Machinery =

Agricultural machinery manufacturing company

Mitsubishi Mahindra Agricultural Machinery Co., Ltd.
- Native name: 三菱マヒンドラ農機株式会社
- Type: Public (K.K)
- Industry: Agricultural machinery
- Founded: 1980
- Headquarters: Matsue, Shimane, Japan
- Area served: Worldwide
- Products: Tractors; Combine harvesters Rice transplanters Tillers
- Parent: Mitsubishi Heavy Industries (66.7%); Mahindra Tractors (33.3%)
- Website: Official website

Mitsubishi Mahindra Agricultural Machinery Co., Ltd. (三菱マヒンドラ農機株式会社, Mitsubishi Mahindora Nōki Kabushiki-Gaisha) is a Japanese agricultural machinery manufacturing company. Its products include tractors, combine harvesters, rice transplanters and tillers.

Headquartered in Higashiizumo, Shimane, Japan, Mitsubishi Agricultural Machinery is a part of the Mitsubishi Group. Mitsubishi Agricultural Machinery was established in February 1980 from the merger of the Mitsubishi Machinery Co., Ltd. and Sato Machinery Co., Ltd.

Mitsubishi equipment is distributed throughout Asia, Europe, Australia and North America. Mitsubishi tractors were sold in the United States for a short period as Satoh tractors, but the current distribution is operated under the Mahindra brand by the respective companies. Grey market tractors are also currently sold in the US. Mitsubishi used to be distributed in the USA under the Cub Cadet and International Harvester brands.

Mitsubishi has partnerships with LS Tractors of South Korea, a division of LS Cable, formerly LG Cable and VST Tillers of India.

== Tractors ==
Small diesel tractors

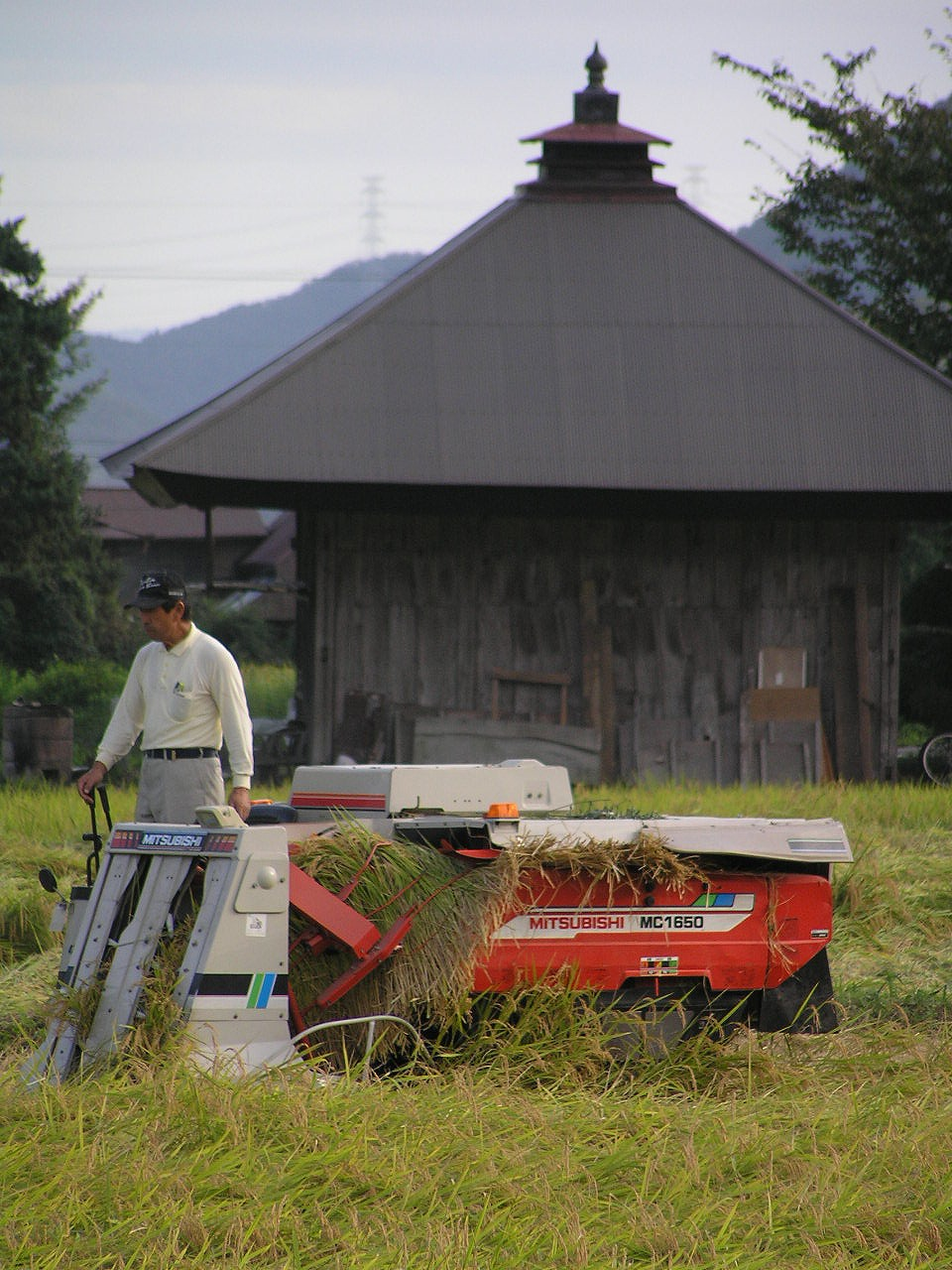
Mitsubishi combine harvester MC1650

The K3x engines range from the 0.773L K3A rated at 15 hp to the 1.496L K3M rated at 30 hp.

K3A - 0.773L - 15hp

K3B - 0.847L - 17hp

K3C - 0.899L - 18.5hp

K3D - 0.978L - 22hp

K3E - 1.061L - 24hp

K3F - 1.117L - 25hp

K3G - 1.235L - 23hp

K3H - 1.289L - 25hp

K3M - 1.496 - 30hp
