= Shut-off nozzle =

Shut-off nozzles are used in the manufacturing process of plastic injection molding. Machine shut-off nozzles serve as the connection between the plasticizing barrel (with reciprocating screw) and the mold. They are mounted on the machineside of the plastic injection molding process, unlike hot runner nozzles which are mounted on the moldside of the process. Machine shut-off nozzles differ from open nozzles because of their closable melt channel.

== Reasons for using ==
Shut-off nozzles are used to avoid drooling of the melt and stringing, as well as to feed with a retracted nozzle.

== Types ==
Shut-off nozzles can be self-controlled or externally controlled.

=== Self-controlled ===
The needle keeps the nozzle orifice closed by spring pressure. When the injection pressure increases, the melt will push back on the needle head and try to open the nozzle. Once the melt inside the nozzle reaches a certain amount of pressure, it will succeed in pushing the needle back against the spring. There must, therefore, be a minimum pressure for the opening process to overcome the force of the spring. Once the nozzle opens, the pressure will drop again and the spring-operated needle will close the nozzle tip orifice.

=== Externally actuated ===
The nozzle is opened by external force, independent of the melt-pressure. The shut-off nozzle’s actuation is hydraulically or pneumatically driven. Externally actuated shut-off nozzles can have different ways of closing the melt stream. Due to the fact that they operate independently of melt-pressure, they can be used for a range of applications such as melt pre-compression, physical and chemical foaming and high-speed injection molding.

==== Needle ====
The melt flow is shut off via a melt channel-axis positioned needle moving back and forth according to actuation. This nozzle type shuts off the melt stream directly at the nozzle orifice-mold interface which prevents drooling.

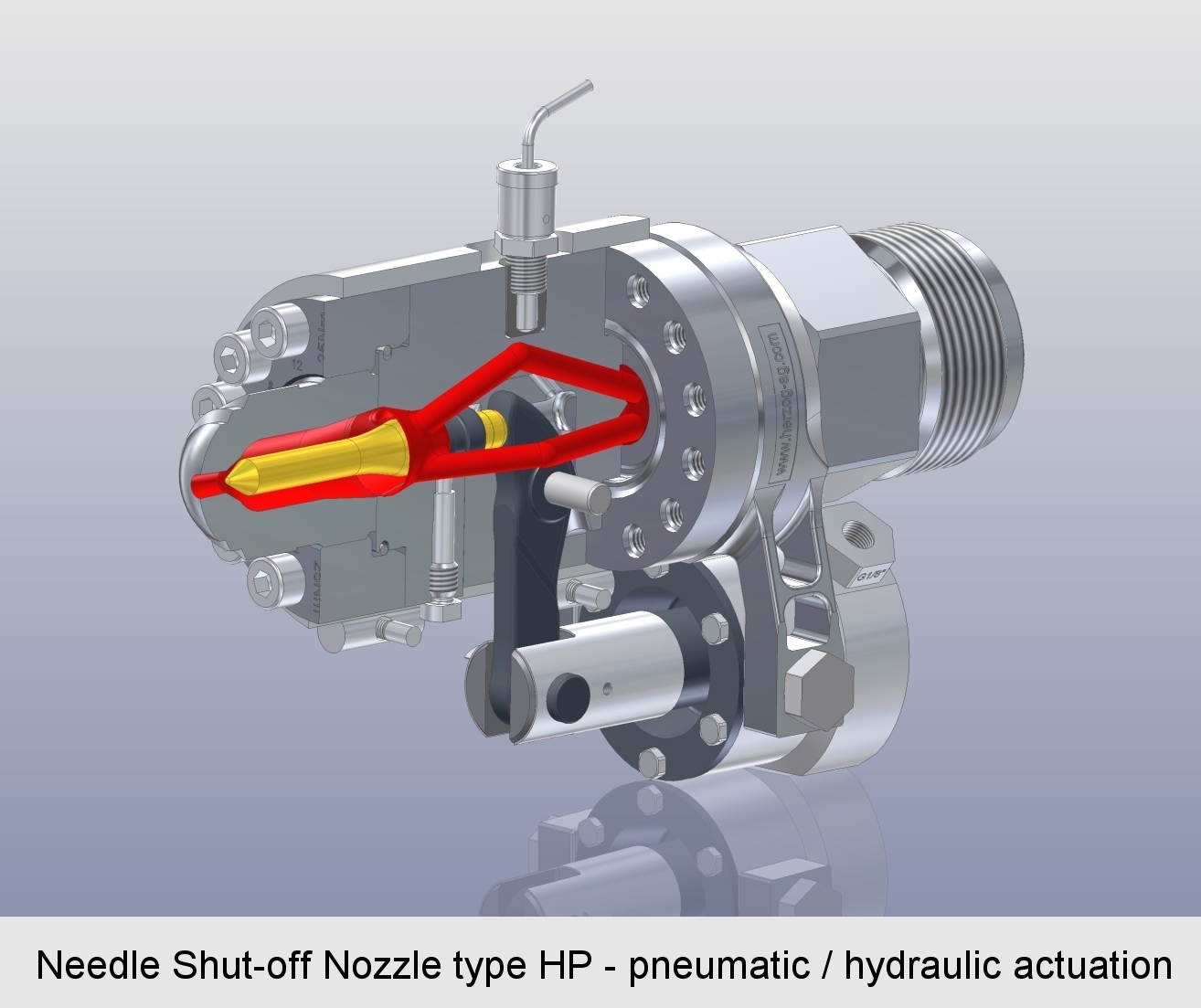
Needle Shut-off Nozzle - pneumatic or hydraulic actuation

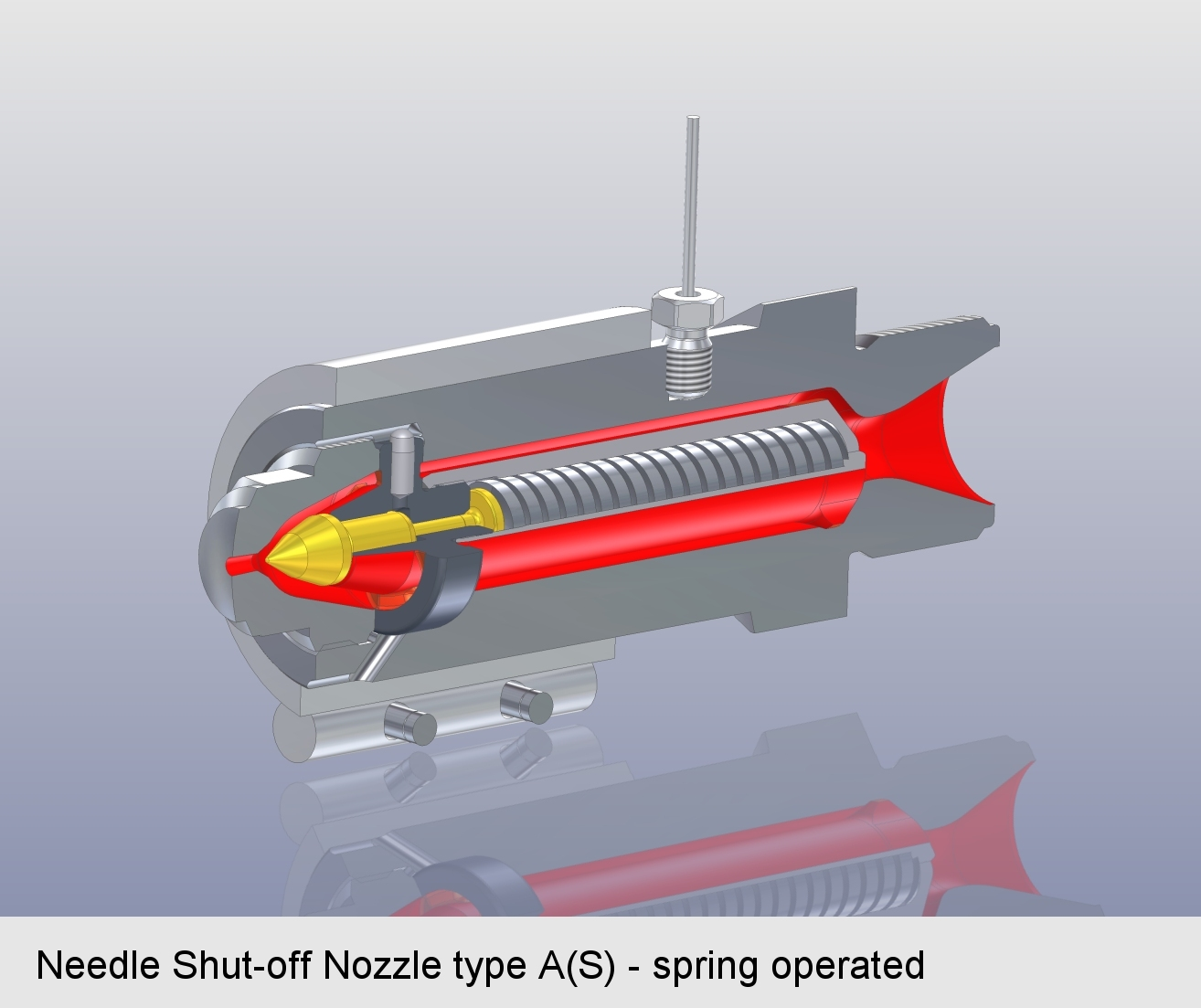
Needle Shut-off Nozzle - spring operated

==== Bolt ====
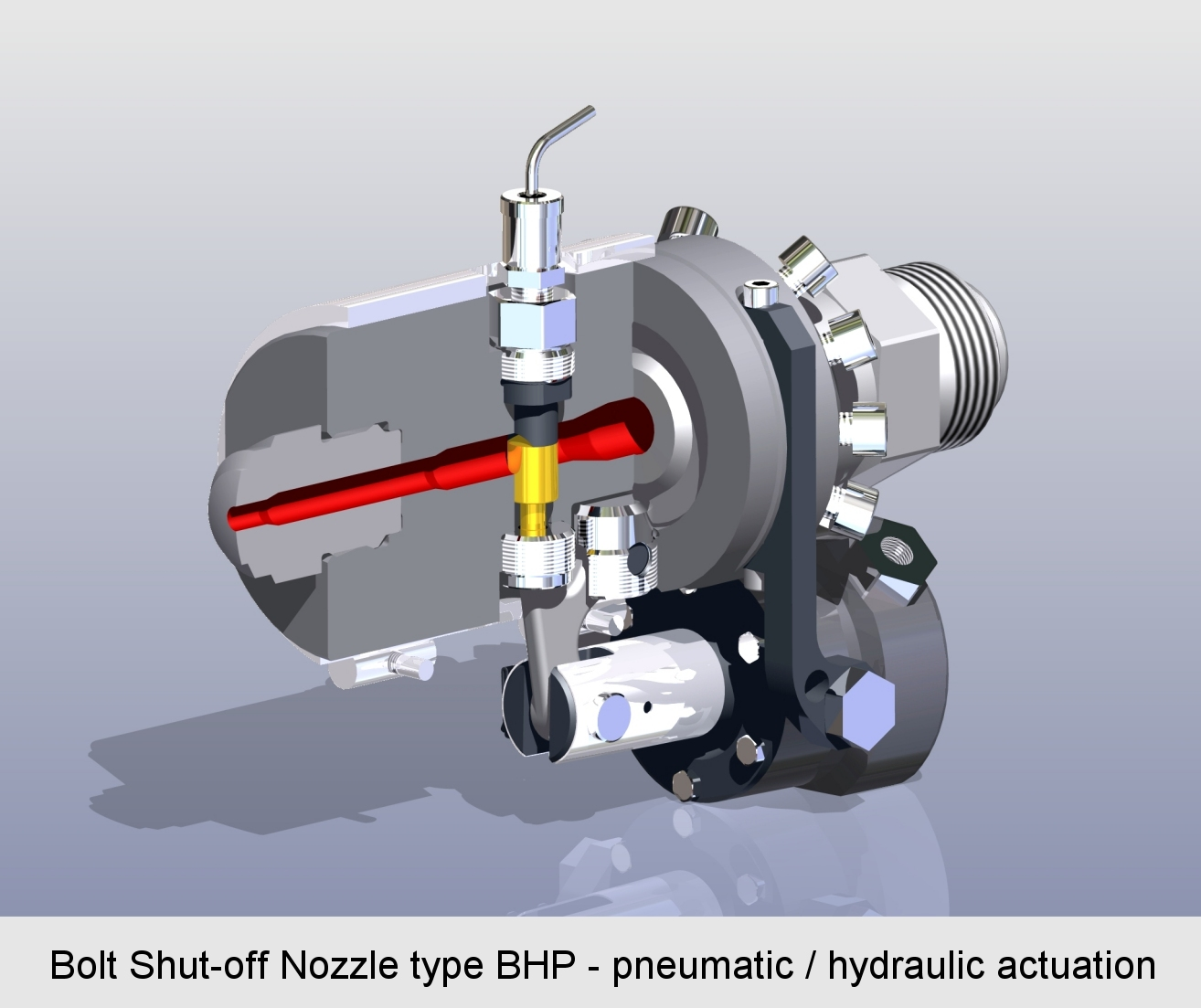
Bolt Shut-off Nozzle - pneumatic or hydraulic actuation

A shut-off bolt, positioned perpendicular to the melt channel moves up and down according to actuation, and thus shuts off/opens the melt flow. This nozzle type has a single melt channel. It therefore does not require rerouting of the melt around the shut-off mechanism. This makes it more suitable for processing of large volumes as well as shear sensitive materials.

==== Rotary ====
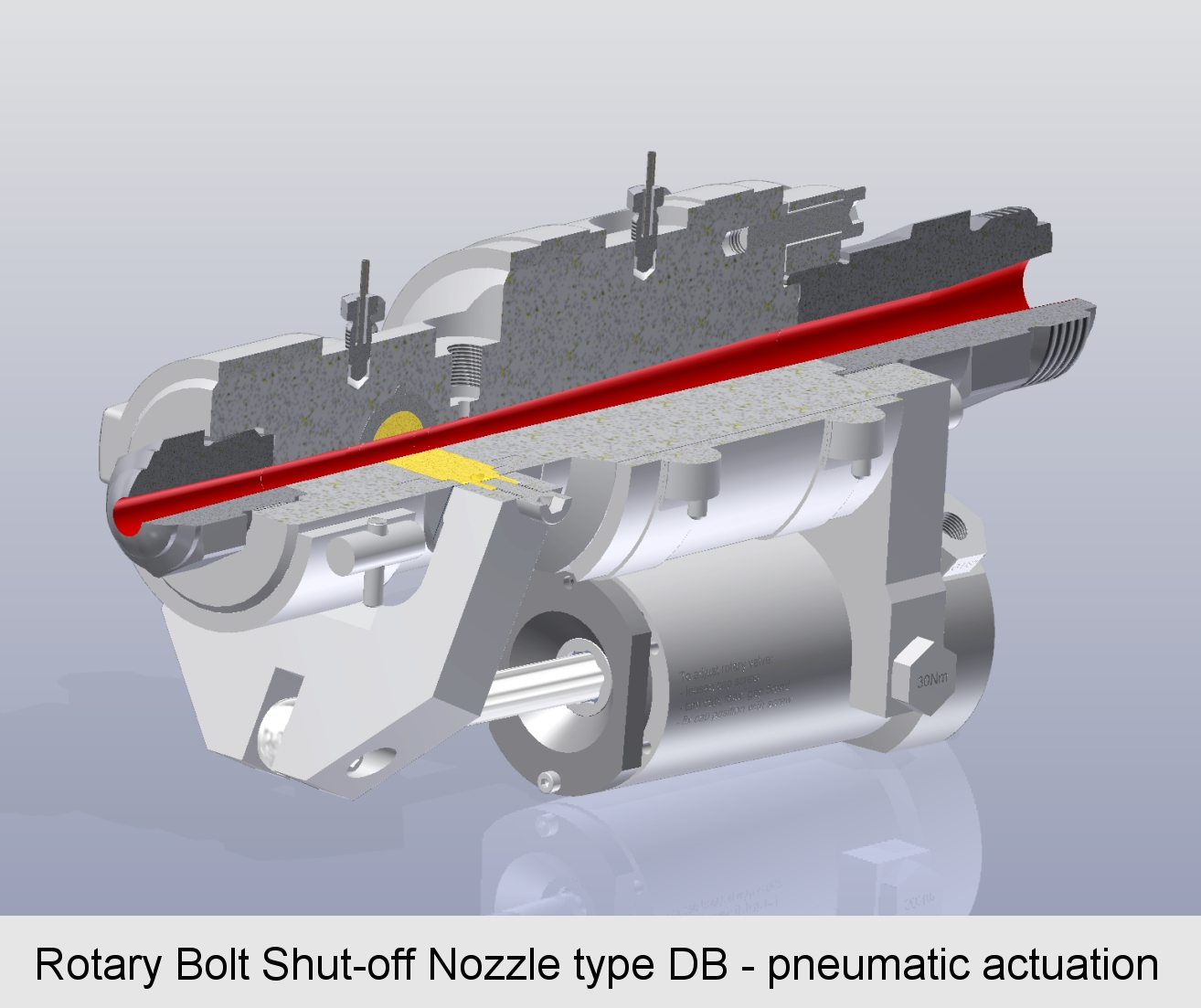
Rotary Bolt Shut-off Nozzle - pneumatic actuation

This nozzle type is fitted with a rotatable bolt assembly which has a cavity equal in size to the melt channel. In its open position, the bolt cavity is directly aligned with the melt stream. When the actuator rotates the bolt assembly, the cavity becomes misaligned and thus shuts off the melt flow.

==== Nozzles for L.S.R ====
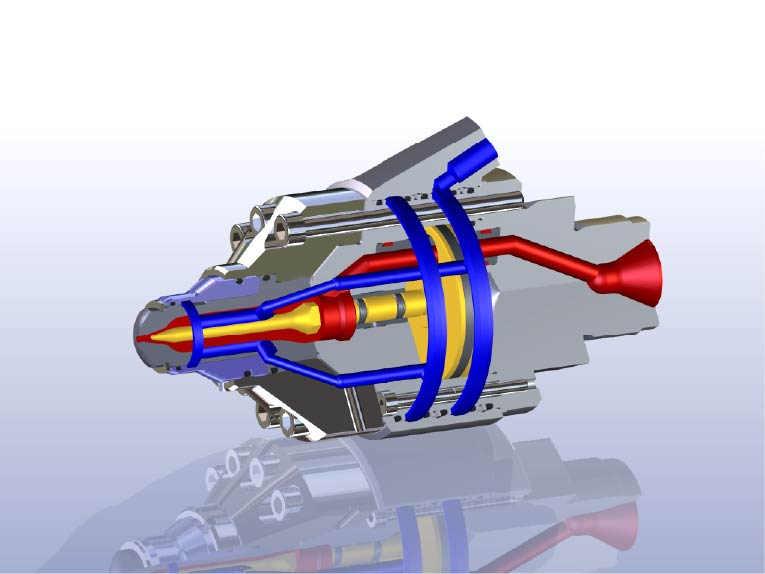
Shut-off Nozzle for LSR

In liquid silicone applications, temperable nozzles with needle valves are often used. Temperature control of the nozzle (approx. 20 °C - 25 °C) prevents the material from curing prematurely. The final curing takes place in the hot mold. The best solution is a needle shut-off nozzle with pneumatically integrated control, where the material flows through the hollow needle and the nozzle tip is designed as a plug with a seal. This option is designed for molds with a cold runner, where thermal separation between the molded part and the sprue occurs. There are also nozzle tip variants with a radius and with cooling along the entire immersion length.
