= LS Group =

South Korean conglomerate

LS Corporation
- Native name: 주식회사 엘에스
- Formerly: LG Cable Group
- Type: Public
- Traded as: KRX: 006260
- Founded: 2003; 23 years ago
- Headquarters: Anyang, South Korea
- Key people: Koo Ja Eun (Chairman)
- Subsidiaries: LS Cable & System; LS Electric; LS Mtron
- Website: lsholdings.com

LS Group is a South Korean chaebol (conglomerate) mostly in electrics, electricity, materials and energy sectors. It is composed of LS Corp. (see below), E1 (LPG), and YESCO (LNG). "LS Corp." is a holding company, which comprises LS Cable & System (power & communications cables), LS ELECTRIC (electrical equipment & automation systems), LS-Nikko Copper (copper smelter & refiner) and LS Mtron (machinery & components). The company is controlled by the Koo family, the founding family of LG Group.

LS Group was spun off from LG Group in 2003.

== Group families ==
- LS Corp
  - LS Cable & System (LS Cable & System, GCI, Alutek, Pountek, Kospace, LS Global, etc.)
    - Gaon Cable (Gaon Cable, Weduss)
  - LS ELECTRIC (Formerly LS Industrial Systems / LG Industrial Systems) (LSITC, LS IS, LS Metal, Planet, LS Mecapion, LS Sauter, LS Power Semitech, Trino)
  - LS MnM (Formerly LS-Nikko Copper) (LS MnM, GRM, Torecom, Recytech Korea, Wahchang, Sunwo)
  - LS Mtron (Daesung Electric/Deltech, Casco, Nongaon Gyeongju, Nongaon Pyeongtaek)
- E1 (E1, E1 Logistics, E1 Container Terminal, Dongbang City Gas)
  - LS Networks (Prospecs)
- YESCO HOLDINGS (YESCO, YESCO Service, Daehan GM, Hansung Group)
- LS I&D (Superior Essex)

== See also ==
- LG Group
- GS Group
