= Injection molding machine =

Machine for manufacturing plastic products

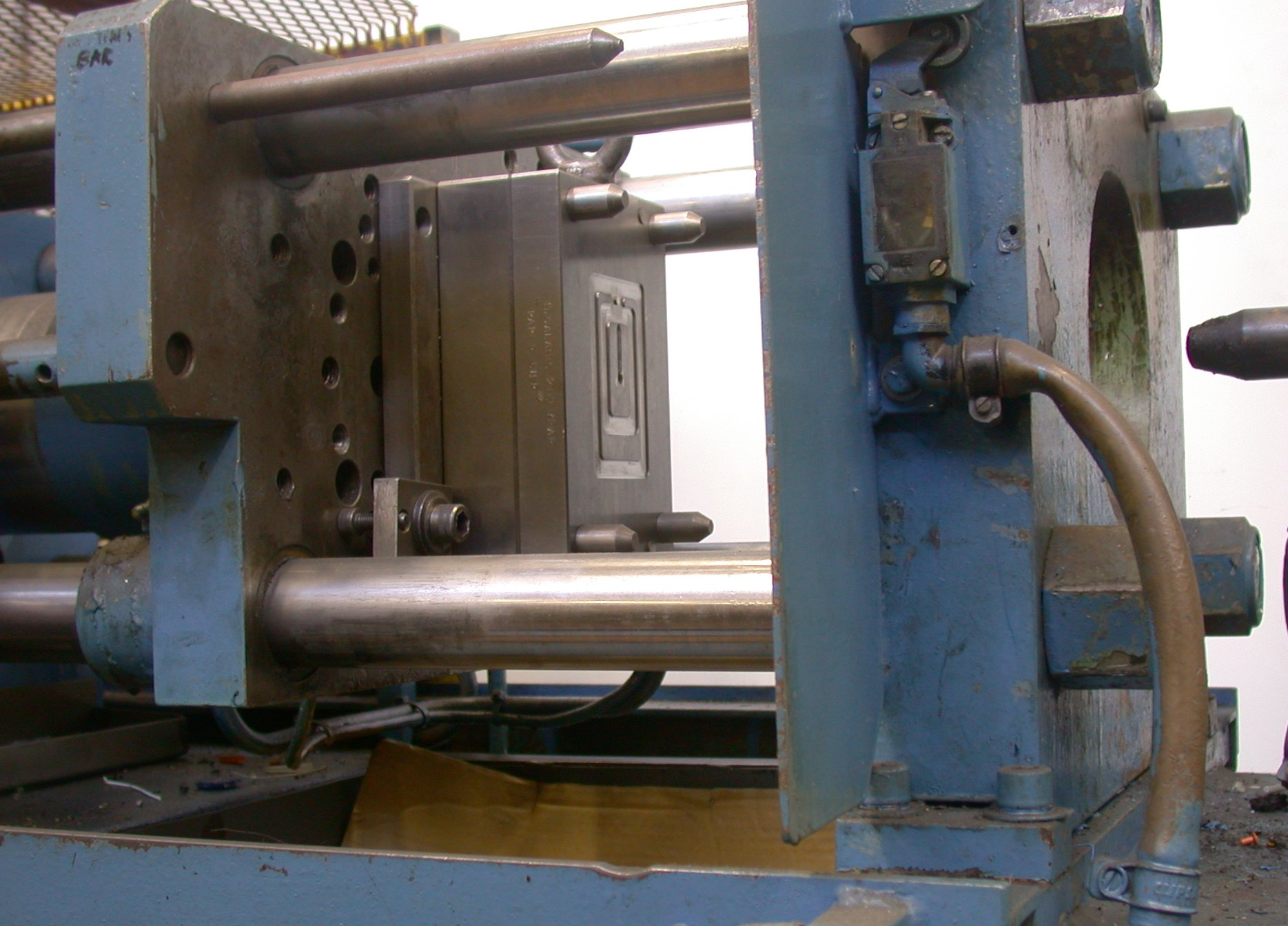
Paper clip mold opened in molding machine; the nozzle is visible at right

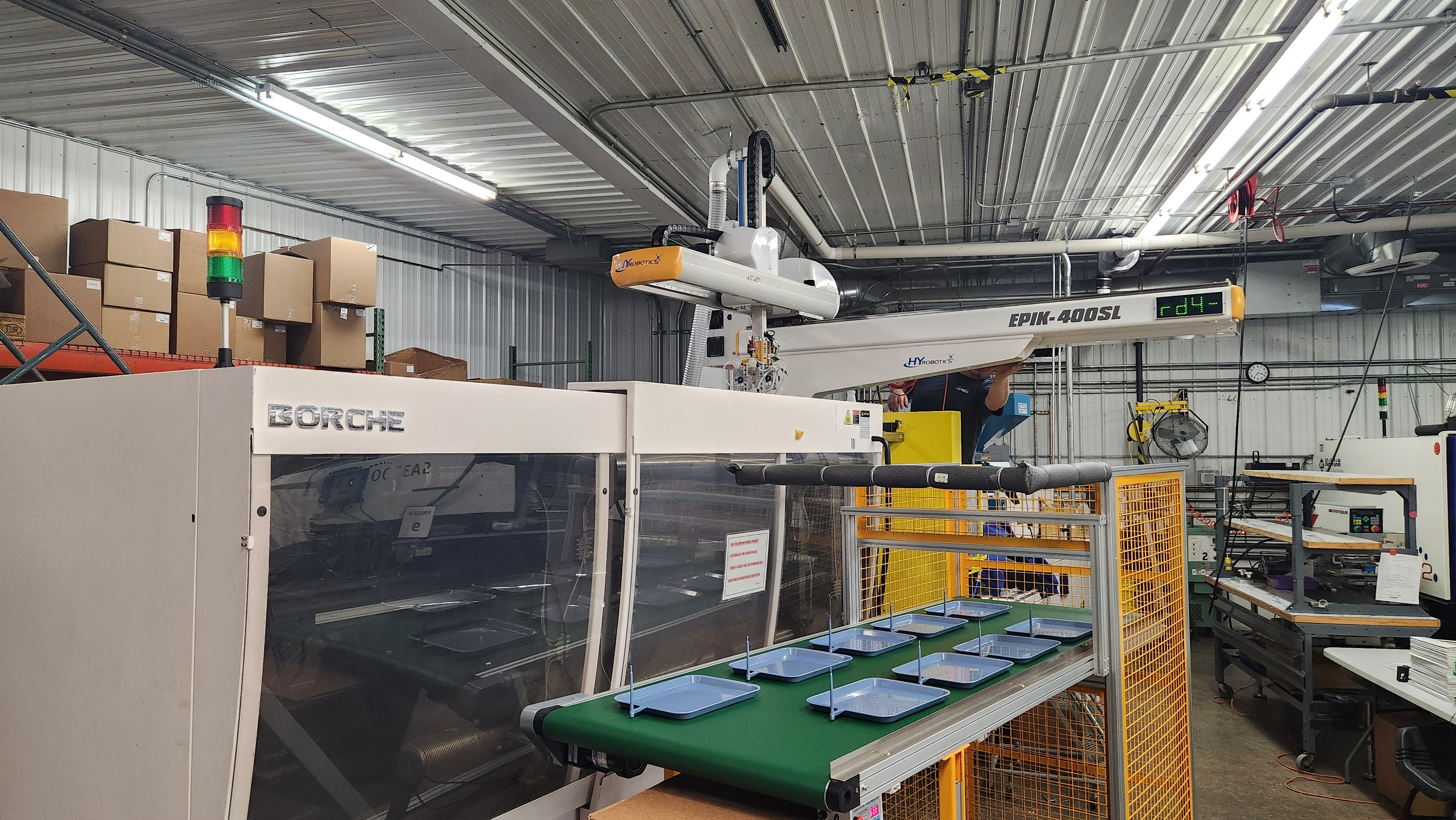
A injection molding machine with a robot

An injection molding machine (spelled injection moulding machine in British English), or injection press, is a machine for manufacturing plastic products by the injection molding process. It consists of four main subsystems: the injection unit, the clamping unit, the drive unit, and control systems.

== Operation ==
Injection molding machine molds can be fastened in either a horizontal or vertical position. Most machines are horizontally oriented, but vertical machines are used in some niche applications such as insert molding, allowing the machine to take advantage of gravity. Some vertical machines also do not require the mold to be fastened. There are many ways to fasten the tools to the platens, the most common are manual clamps (both halves are bolted to the platens); however, hydraulic clamps (chocks are used to hold the tool in place) and magnetic clamps are also used. The magnetic and hydraulic clamps are used where fast tool changes are required.

Regarding methods of cooling, both cold and hot runner systems exist; additionally, types of hot runner systems include insulated runners, internally heated, and externally heated systems.

A cold runner is a simple channel carved into the mold.

The plastic that fills the cold runner cools as the part cools and is then ejected with the part as a sprue. A hot runner system is more complicated, often using cartridge heaters to keep the plastic in the runners hot as the part cools. This process relies on the thermoplastic's insulating effect to reduce heat loss within the mold. After the part is ejected, the plastic remaining in a hot runner is injected into the next part.

== Types of injection molding machines ==
Injection molding machines are classified primarily by the type of driving systems they use.

=== Hydraulic ===
Hydraulic machines have historically been the only option available to molders until Nissei Plastic Industrial introduced the first all-electric injection molding machine in 1983. Hydraulic machines, although not nearly as precise, are the predominant type in most of the world, with the exception of Japan. Their strength and durability ensure their dominance in the current market.

=== Mechanical ===
Mechanical type machines use the toggle system for building up tonnage on the clamps of the machine. Tonnage is required on all machines so that the clamps of the machine do not open due to the injection pressure. If the mold partially opens up, it will create flashing in the plastic product.

=== Electric ===
The electric press, also known as Electric Machine Technology (EMT), reduces operation costs by cutting energy consumption, saving 0.73 kWh for every kilogram of plastic produced. They also address some of the environmental concerns surrounding the hydraulic press. Electric presses have been shown to be quieter, faster, and have a higher accuracy, however the machines are more expensive.

In 1983, an all-electric injection molding machine, Roboshot, was developed by Milacron, an American-based injection molding manufacturer and produced in collaboration with Fujitsu (now FANUC). The latest iteration of the series, Alpha-SiB, was released in 2021, and offers flexibility in part manufacturing sizes in addition to a wide range of applications.

=== Hybrid ===
Hybrid injection (sometimes referred to as "Servo-Hydraulic") molding machines claim to take advantage of the best features of both hydraulic and electric systems, but in actuality use almost the same amount of electricity to operate as an electric injection molding machine depending on the manufacturer.

A robotic arm is often used to remove the molded components; either by side or top entry, but it is more common for parts to drop out of the mold, through a chute and into a container.

== Main components of injection molding machine ==
=== Injection unit ===
Consists of three main components:

1. Mold: The mold holds the shape of the part being produced and must be filled as densely as possible to capture all the details. For this reason, the injection pressure is a critical factor in the production of injection-molded parts.
2. Reciprocating screw and barrel: The screw component is responsible for both even mixing of plastic pellets as they melt and for transfer of the liquid plastic into the mold. This plastic is transferred into the mold through the barrel, which applies pressure as the liquid travels to ensure even distribution of plastic into the mold to totally fill the mold.
3. Heaters, thermocouples and ring plunger: Heat is applied to plastic pellets within the screw component. In hot runner systems, additional heating units allow plastic in the runners to maintain a high temperature while the finished part is ejected.

=== Clamping unit ===
Consists of three main components:

1. Clamping motor drive: The opening and closing of the mold accomplished through a clamp, either electromechanical or hydraulic, is known as a toggle mechanism. Toggle systems are the industry standard, particularly in Asia, and pure mechanical clamp systems are rare and usually found in older machines. The force output in metric tonnage of the clamp is critical in preserving the shape of the molded part; if the force is not strong enough to counteract the pressure of the injected plastic, defective parts may be produced.
2. Tie bars: The primary purpose of tie bars is to stabilize and guide the platens as they are moved to compress the mold. However, improvements in clamping mechanisms in the past few decades have seen a rise in IMMs without tie bars. Tie bar spacing outlines the maximum dimensions of molds which can be used.
3. Platens: In general, a fixed platen and moving platen are used to apply pressure to the mold while the plastic cools. The amount of platens in any given IMM varies; however, the industry standard uses three support platens, wherein the central one is movable to enable opening and closing. The number of platens is not correlated with the number of tie bars, and generally the design of the clamping unit is irrelevant so long as the unit's locking force exceeds the pressure from the mold during part cooling. The maximum size of the mold which can be used depends on platen dimensions.

=== Drive Unit ===
The drive unit is responsible for axial screw movement. Most modern IMMs use an electric screw motor drive, but hydraulic models are also used. In all-electric IMMs, screw motion is achieved through three separate servo motors; one rotates the screw, pushing the plastic feed forward, one moves the screw towards the barrel, and one toggles the mold between open and closed.

=== Control Systems ===
The control system in any injection molding machine monitors the functioning of all components to stabilize pressure and temperature in order to produce quality parts. While other factors such as melt and mold temperatures, cavity and holding pressures, and injection speed have minor effects on the quality of the part, pressure and temperature are the most critical qualities to keep constant. Subsequently, qualities such as clamping forces and flow rates (as well as oil temperature and pressure and barrel temperature in hydraulic models) are controlled throughout the production process.
