= LS Tower =

Coordinates: 37°22′20.12″N 126°56′50.05″E

- Interactive map of the LS Tower area

General information
- Type: Office
- Location: LS-ro 127, Dongan-gu, Anyang, South Korea
- Construction started: 2006
- Completed: 2008
- Cost: ~$71.32 million (KRW-USD exchange rate 1,262:1, spot rate as of December 31, 2008)

Technical details
- Floor count: 20
- Floor area: 51,901m²
- Lifts/elevators: 9

The LS Tower (Korean: LS 타워, 엘에스 타워) is the headquarters of the Korean cable manufacturer LS Cable & System and is located in Anyang, South Korea. The construction works for the 20-story building began in 2006 and LS Cable & System moved its headquarters to LS Tower after its completion in 2008. LS Tower was built to host 1500 people, 17 of its 20 stories are above ground level and 3 below. The floors 4 to 10 belong to LS Industrial Systems, the 12th to the 17th to LS Cable & System and the 11th floor is occupied by LS Mtron.

The floors below ground level host a fitness center, several stores and a café / restaurant as well as the building's parking lot.

Also, an Woori Bank, as well as a small exhibition of LS Cable & System's products and the cafeteria are located on the first floor. On top of the tower, on the 17th floor, there is, apart from several meeting rooms, an Asian garden for the employees of LS Cable & System to relax and to spend their time during breaks.

== Location ==
LS Tower is located about 200 meters from Geumjeong Station (the closest exit is exit 1), a subway station served by the lines 1 (dark blue line) and 4 (light blue line) of the Seoul Subway. The closest bus stop is "LS 타워" (English: LS Tower), located in front of the building and served by the bus lines 5, 64, 65 and 6–2.

Garden on top of LS Tower, 17th floor

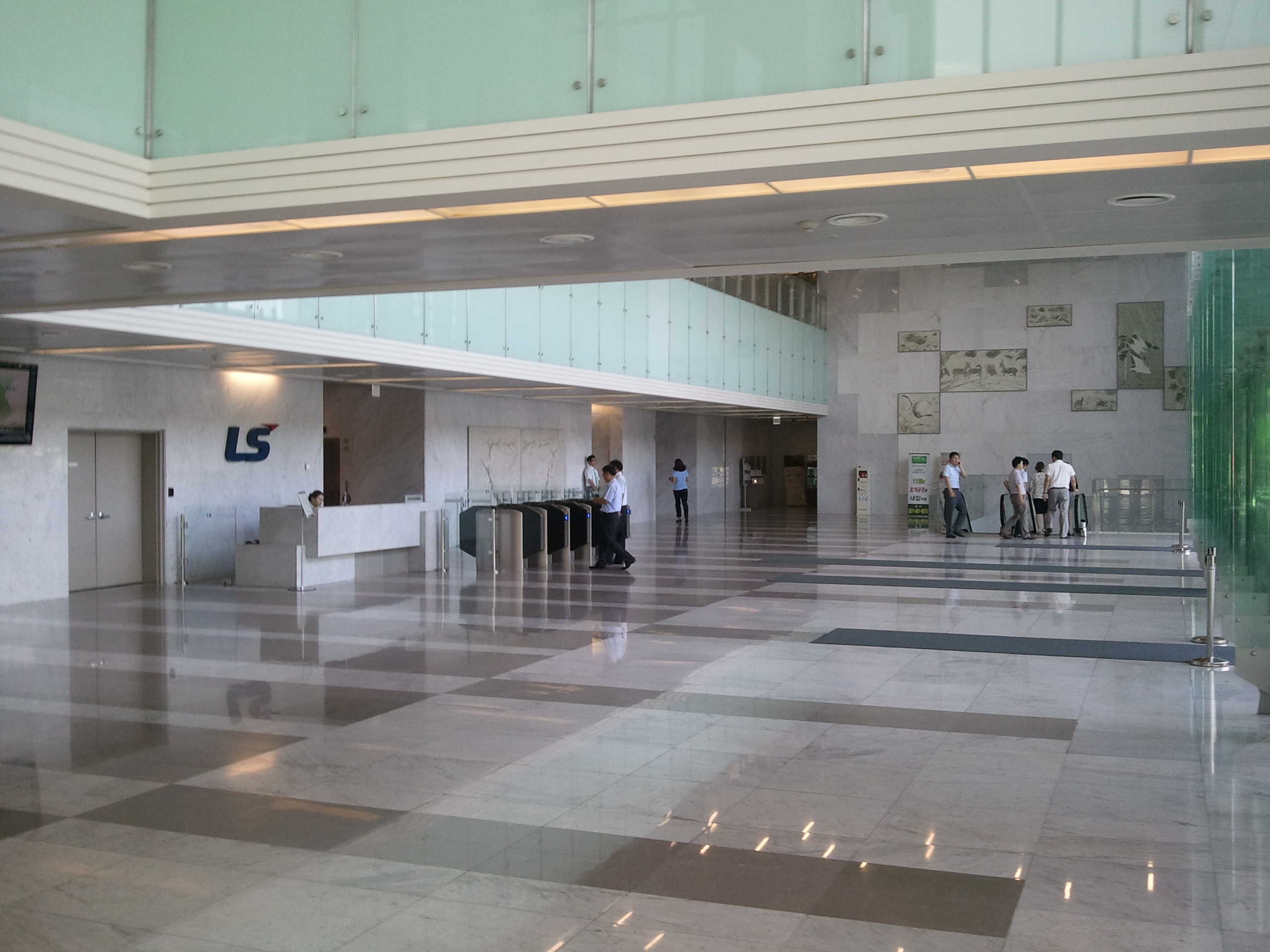
Lobby of LS Tower, first floor

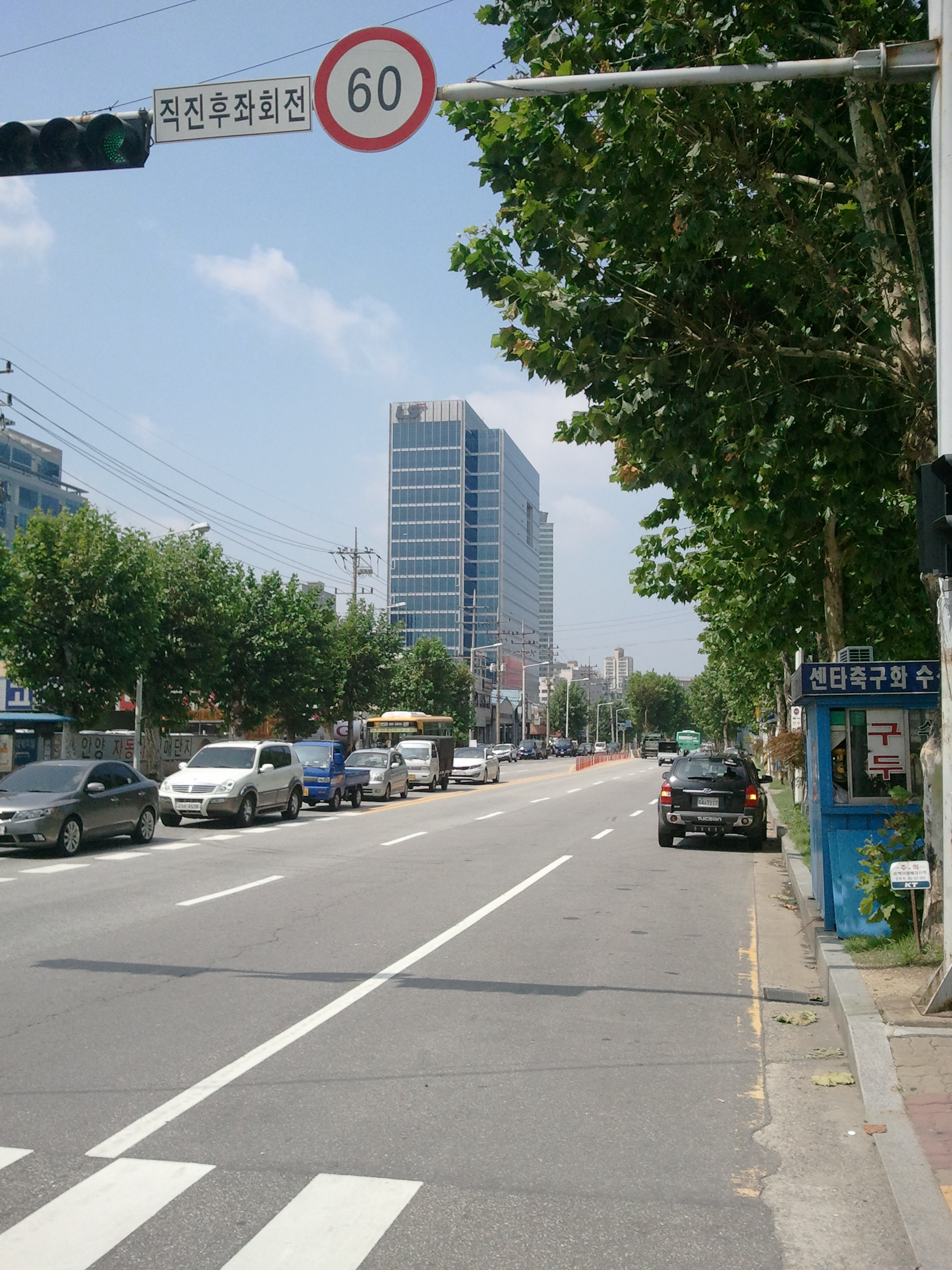
LS Tower, view from the south-east

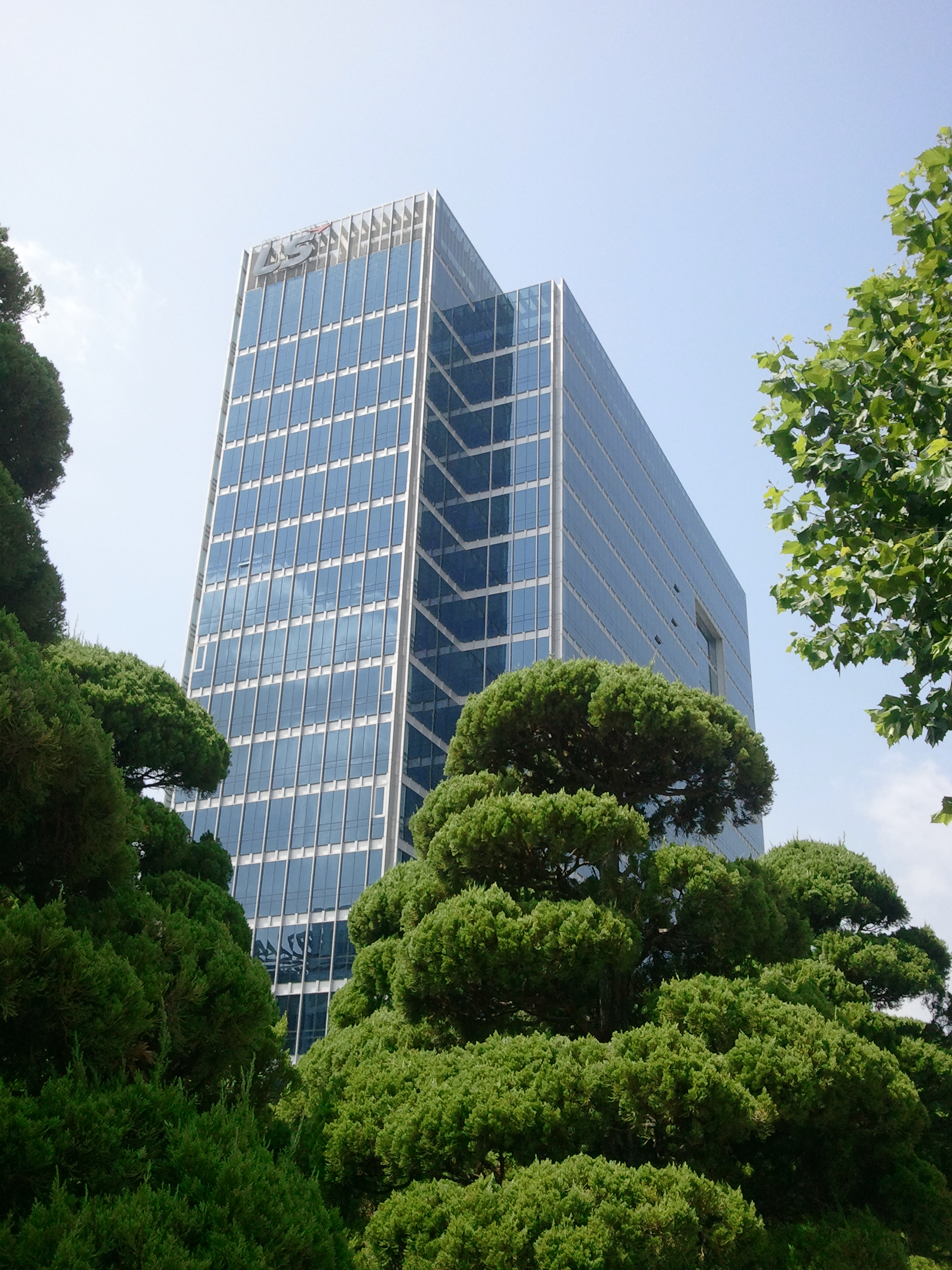
LS Tower, close capture from the south-east

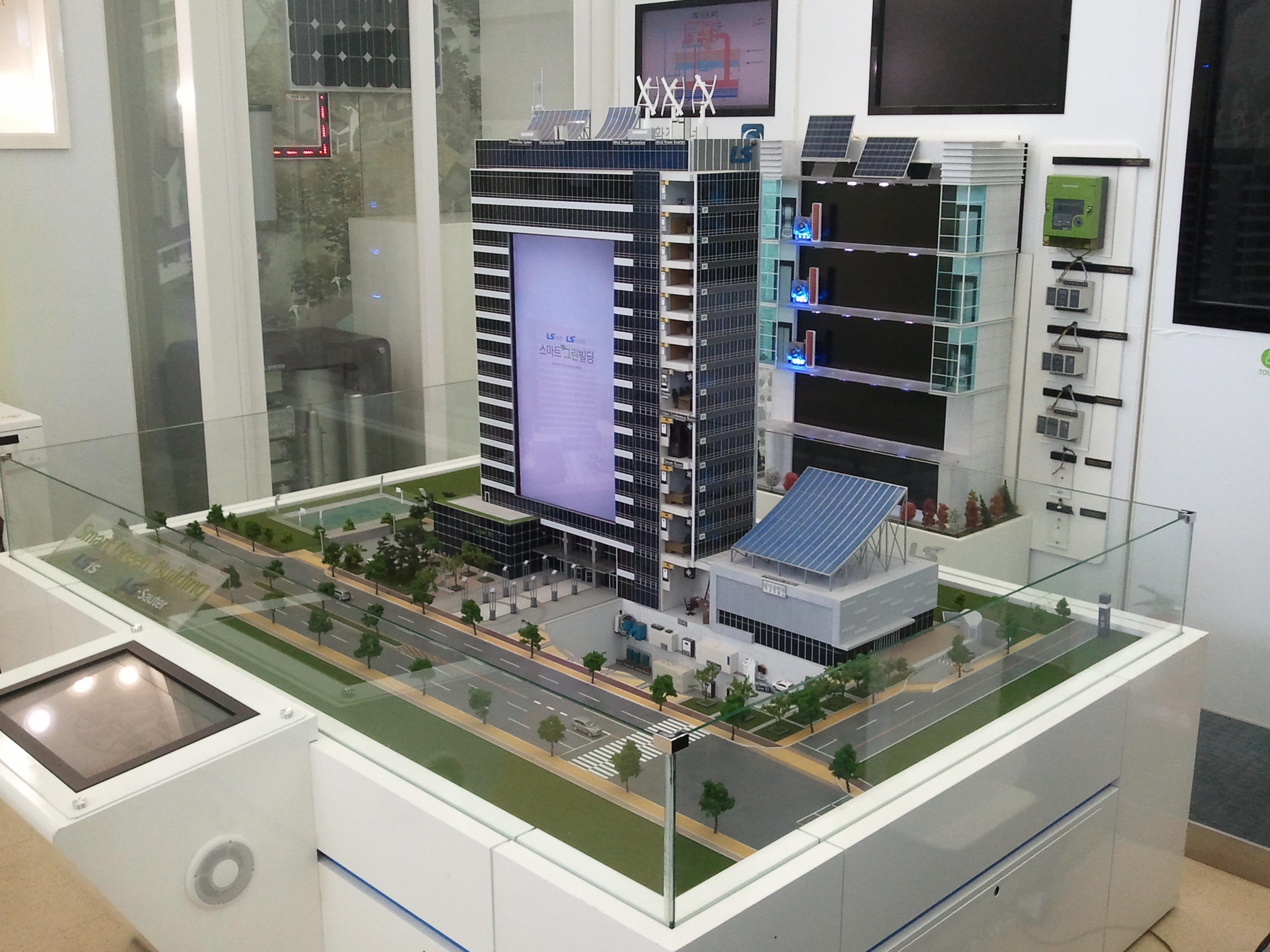
Model of LS Tower as shown on the exhibition inside LS Tower, 1st floor

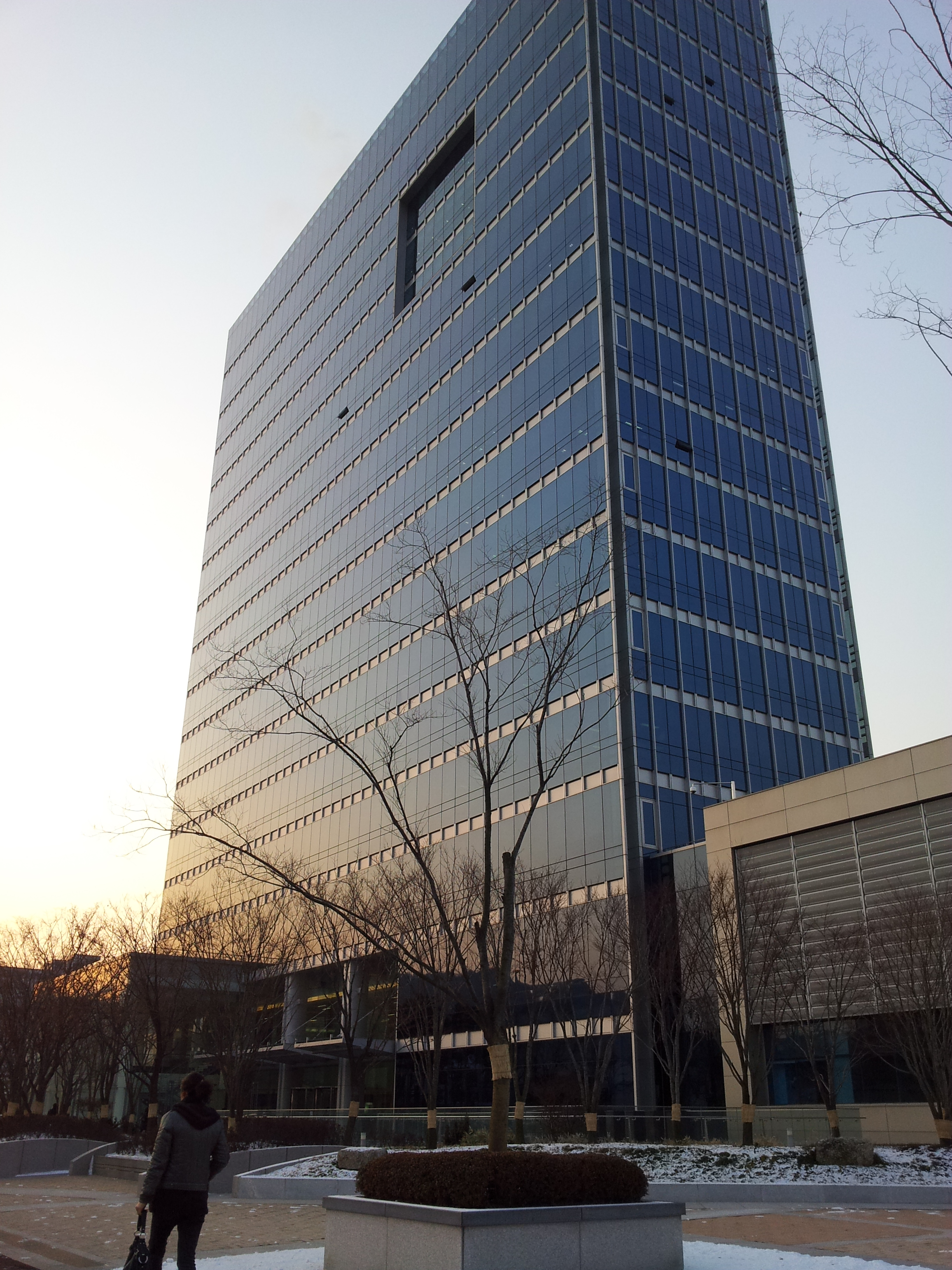
LS Tower in Winter
