= LS Mtron =

Heavy machinery manufacturer

LS Mtron Co., Ltd.
- Native name: 엘에스엠트론
- Formerly: Korea Heavy Industries & Construction (1977–2008)
- Type: Subsidiary
- Industry: Defense; Electronic; Machinery
- Founded: 1977; 49 years ago
- Headquarters: Anyang, Gyeonggi, South Korea
- Area served: Worldwide
- Key people: Koo Bon-kyu (CEO)
- Products: Antennas; Continuous tracks; Electrical connectors; Injection molding machines; Tractors
- Revenue: KRW 830 billion (FY 2020) (US$ 710 million) (FY 2020)
- Parent: LS Group
- Website: https://www.lsmtron.com/

LS Mtron Co., Ltd. (Korean: 엘에스엠트론) is a South Korean heavy machinery and electronic components manufacturer company headquartered in Anyang, Gyeonggi, South Korea. Its products include tractors, continuous tracks, injection molding machines, and electronic components. LS Mtron is a member of LS Group, which was spun off from LG Group in 2003.

== History ==
In 1977, KHIC (Korea Heavy Industries & Construction Co.) begins the production of tractors in collaboration with Fiat at the Gunpo plant. In 1983, Goldstar Heavy Industries (LS Mtron) acquired KHIC's agricultural machinery division. Currently, LS Mtron has 4 factories in South Korea, Brazil, China and U.S.

== Products ==
=== Continuous tracks for military vehicles ===
- K1 main battle tank (MBT) track
- K1A1 MBT track
- K2 Black Panther MBT track
- T158LL track for M1 Abrams MBT
- T84E1 track for M47 Patton MBT
- T97E2 track for M48 Patton MBT
- T142 track for M60 MBT
- T107 track for M88A1 armoured recovery vehicle (ARV)
- T-72 BMT track
- T-72 PLUS detachable pad MBT track
- T-80U BMT track
- T-90 MBT track
- Altay MBT track
- K21 infantry fighting vehicle (IFV) track
- K230 track for K30 Biho self-propelled anti-aircraft weapon
- K231 track for K31 Cheonma vehicle
- T157I track for M2 Bradley and CV90 IFV
- T164 track for M9 armored combat earthmover (ACE)
- T130E1 / T150F track for M113 and K200 armored personnel carrier (APC)
- BMP-1 IFV track
- BMP-2 IFV track
- BMP-3 IFV track
- K9 Thunder self-propelled howitzer (SPH) track
- K55A1 SPH track
- T132E1 track for M107, M110 SPH and M578 light recovery vehicle
- T136 / T154 track for M109 Paladin SPH

=== Electronic components ===
- GB170 connector
- LST connector for 5G antenna module
- GB17S connector for camera module
- Antenna for vehicle

=== Injection molding machines ===
- the ONE*
- the ONE*-E
- WIZ Plus
- WIZ-E Plus
- WIZ-T Plus II
- WIZ-VR II
- MuCell

==== Multi-type / Multi-color Injection Molding Machine ====
- WIZ-EV
- WIZ-EC
- WIZ-ED
- WIZ-EPR
- WIZ-3000XHB

=== Tractors ===
- MT1
- MT3
- MT4
- MT5
- MT7
- MRP65D
- MRP85D
- T5 DC
- T6
- T6 DC
- T7
- V6120A
- XG
