= Hot runner =

Injection molding system

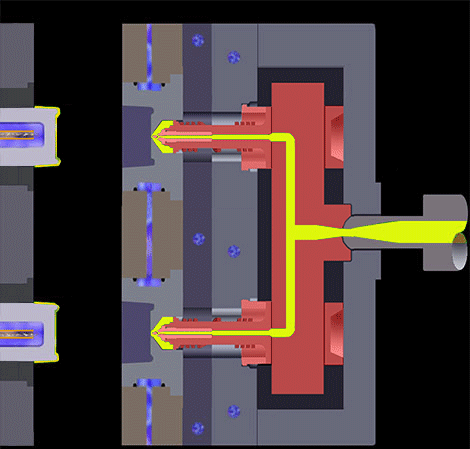
Mold open cycle

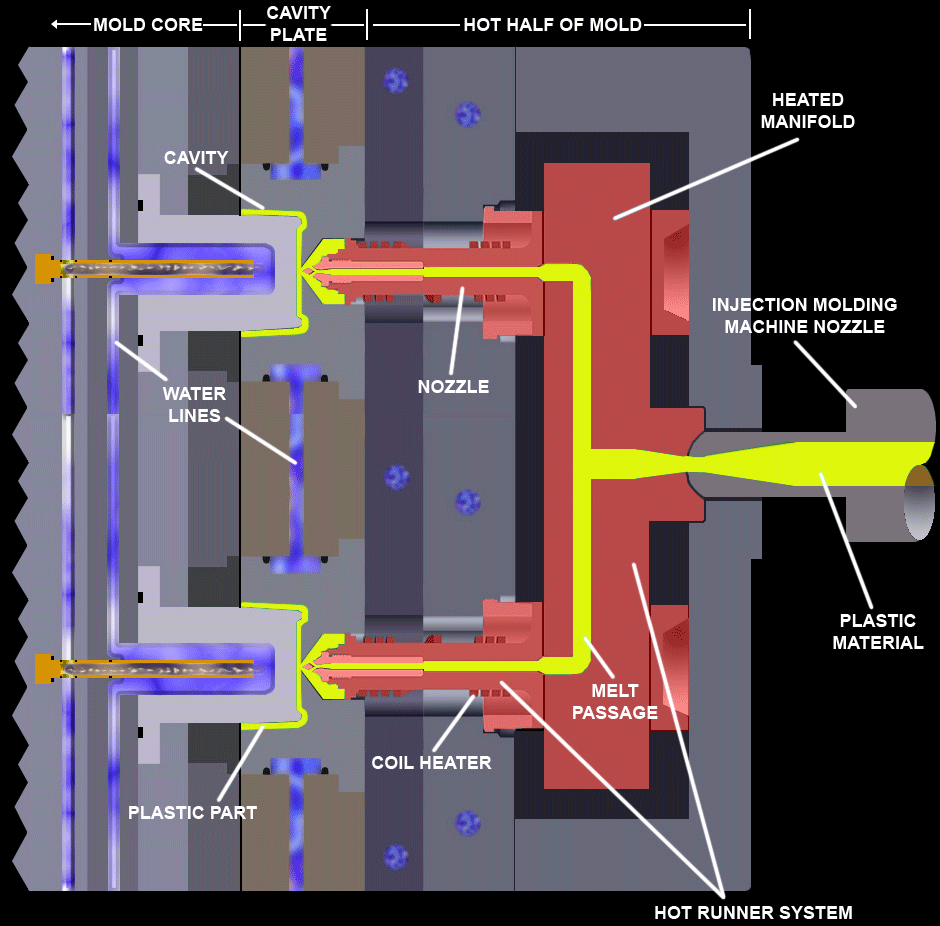
Injection cycle

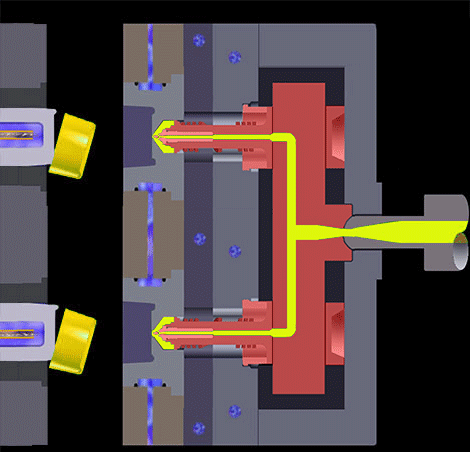
Part ejection cycle

A hot runner system is an assembly of heated components used in plastic injection molds that inject molten plastic into the cavities of the mold. (The cavities are the part of the mold shaped like the parts to be produced.)

By contrast, a cold runner is simply a channel formed between the two halves of the mold, for the purpose of carrying plastic from the injection molding machine nozzle to the cavities. Each time the mold opens to eject the newly formed plastic parts, the material in the runner is ejected as well, resulting in waste. A hot runner system usually includes a heated manifold and a number of heated nozzles. The main task of the manifold is to distribute the plastic entering the mold to the various nozzles which then meter it precisely to the injection points in the cavities.

== Hot runner advantages ==
- Shorter cycle time: No runner controlling the cooling time
- Easier to start: Without runners to remove, and auto cycle occurs faster and more frequently
- Fewer sink marks and under-filled parts: Unlike when plastic flows through a cold runner and loses heat to mold plates
- Design flexibility: Can locate the gate at many points on the part
- Balanced melt flow: Separate melt channels are in externally heated manifolds that are insulated from mold plates surrounding them.

Hot runner systems were first developed and came into sporadic use in the early 60s with generally negative results. They gained popularity in the 80s and 90s as technological advancements allowed improved reliability and the escalation of plastic materials prices made hot runner systems more desirable and cost effective. Hot runners are fairly complicated systems, they have to maintain the plastic material within them heated uniformly, while the rest of the injection mold is being cooled in order to solidify the product quickly. For this reason they are usually assembled from components pre manufactured by specialized companies.

A hot runner controller is a temperature controller used to control the temperature in the hot runner. This helps create the most consistent part(s).

Hot runners usually make the mold more expensive to manufacture and run, but generate savings by reducing non-productive plastic and allowing shorter cycle time. (do not have to wait until the conventional runners freeze).

== Components ==
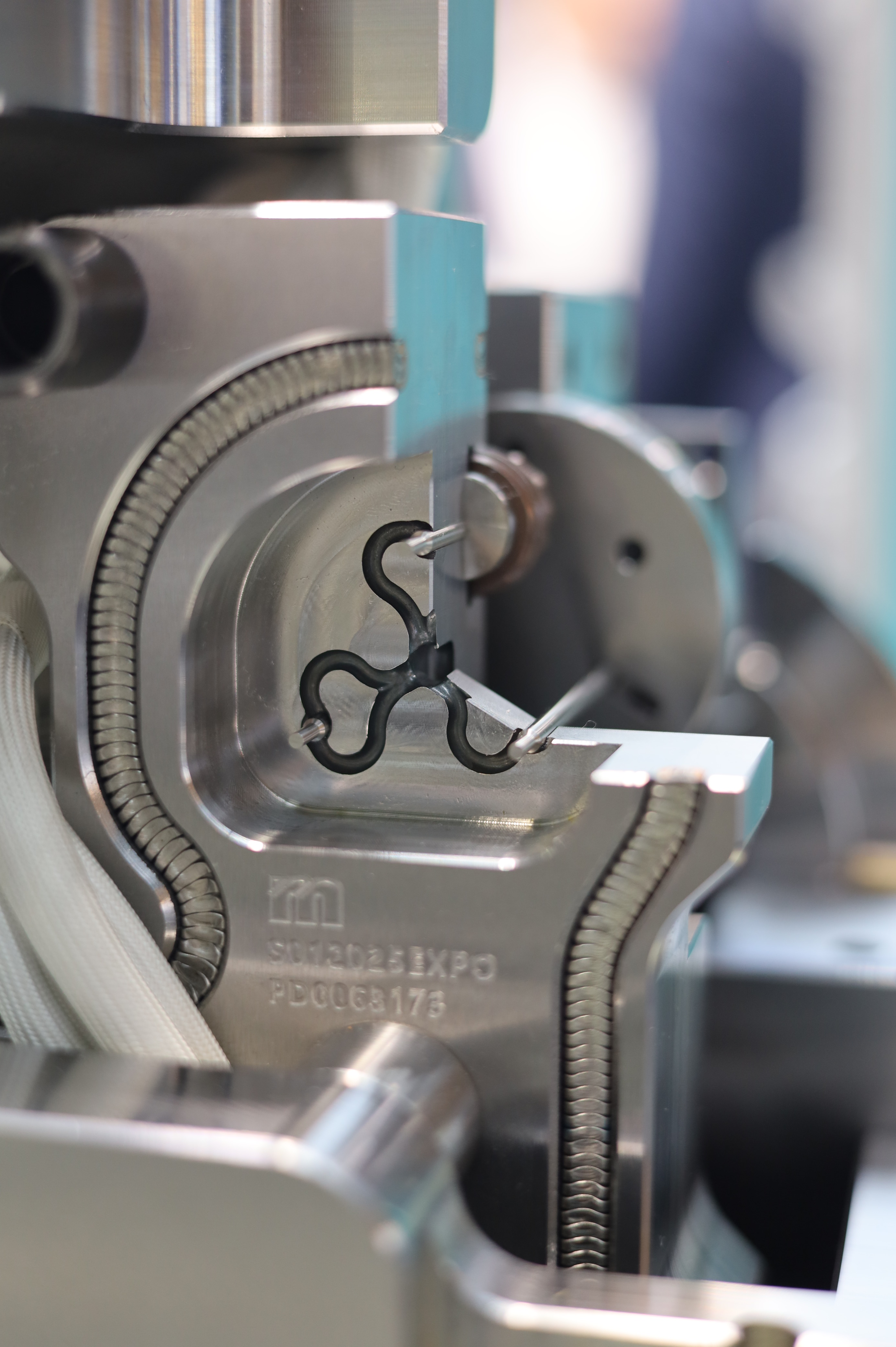
Sidecut of a hot runner

A typical hot runner system consists of several heated components that maintain the polymer in a molten state as it flows from the injection unit to the mold cavities. The main elements include a manifold, nozzles, heaters, thermocouples, and insulation materials that help control heat distribution and prevent thermal loss. The manifold channels molten plastic from the machine’s nozzle to individual nozzles feeding each cavity, while nozzle assemblies deliver the melt precisely into the mold gates. Integrated temperature controllers monitor and adjust heat zones to maintain consistent flow and minimize degradation of heat-sensitive resins.

== Maintenance and System Care ==
Proper maintenance is essential for ensuring the long-term reliability and performance of hot runner systems. Over time, polymer residues, thermal cycling, and wear can cause issues such as leakage, inconsistent heating, or flow restrictions. Preventive maintenance practices typically include periodic manifold cleaning, nozzle inspection, and heater and thermocouple calibration to verify uniform temperature control. Careful disassembly and cleaning help prevent carbon buildup and prolong component life. Manufacturers often use thermal cleaning methods or purging compounds to remove polymer residue safely without damaging precision surfaces. Consistent maintenance schedules can significantly reduce downtime and improve overall molding efficiency.

== See also ==
- Cartridge heater
- Plastic Injection Molding
