= Cartridge heater =

Cartridge Heater
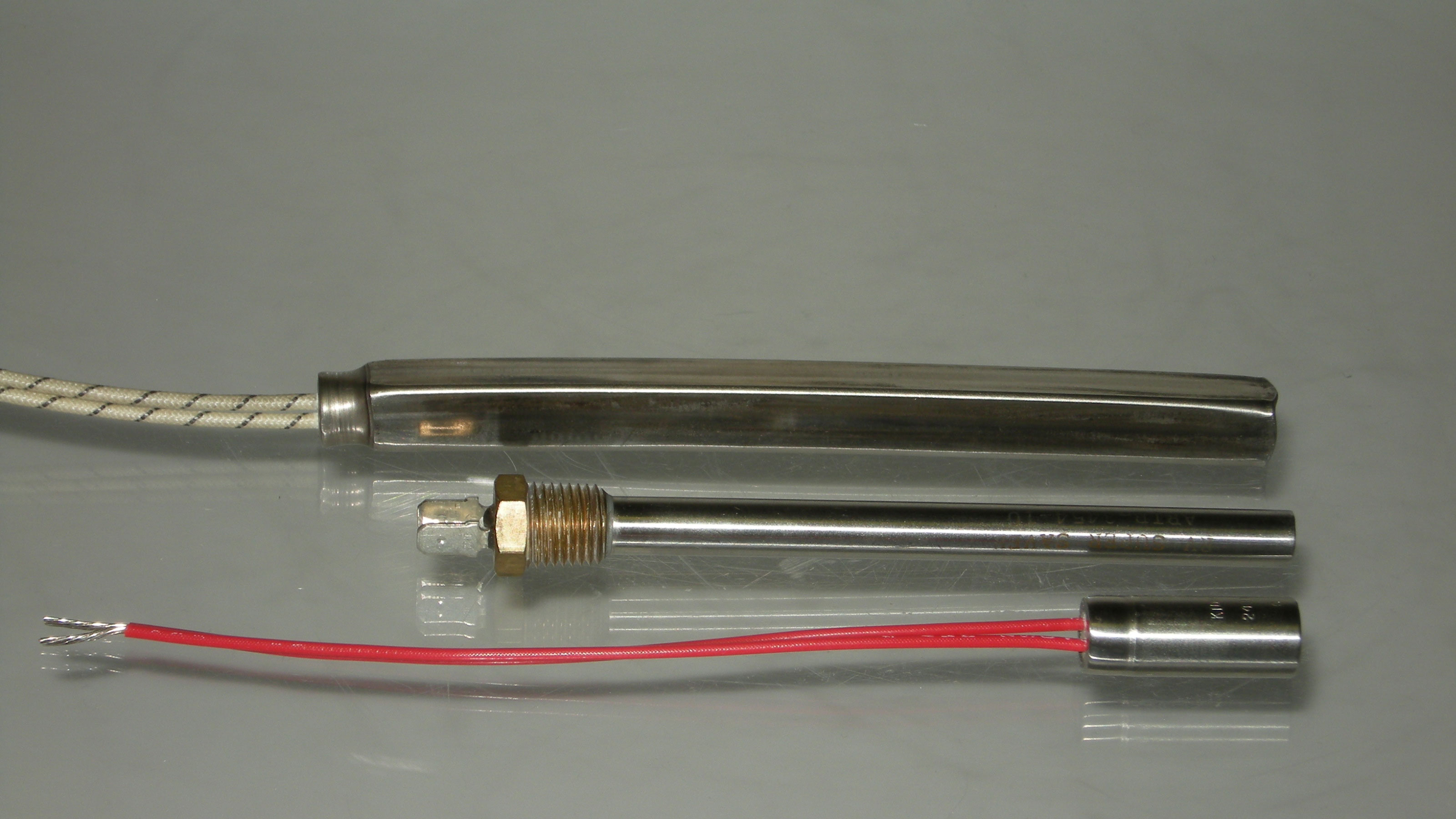
- From top to bottom: Square cartridge heater, cartridge heater with threaded NPT fitting (tapered threads), "mini" cartridge heater.
- Industry: Process heating

A cartridge heater is a tube-shaped, heavy-duty, industrial Joule heating element used in the process heating industry, usually custom manufactured to a specific watt density, based on its intended application. Compact designs are capable of reaching a power density of up to 50W/cm² while some specialty high temperature designs can reach 100w/cm².

== Applications ==
Cartridge heaters are found useful in many applications, such as:

- Seal bars
- Torpedo heaters for injection molding
- Injection molding manifolds
- Mass spectrometry
- Rubber molding
- Food production
- Immersion tank heating
- HVAC compressors
- Fuel cells
- Semiconductors
- Medical devices
- Sensor measurement devices
- Extrusion
- Die casting
- Hot melt adhesives
- Heat staking / hole punch
- Plastic welding
- Fluid heating
- 3D printers
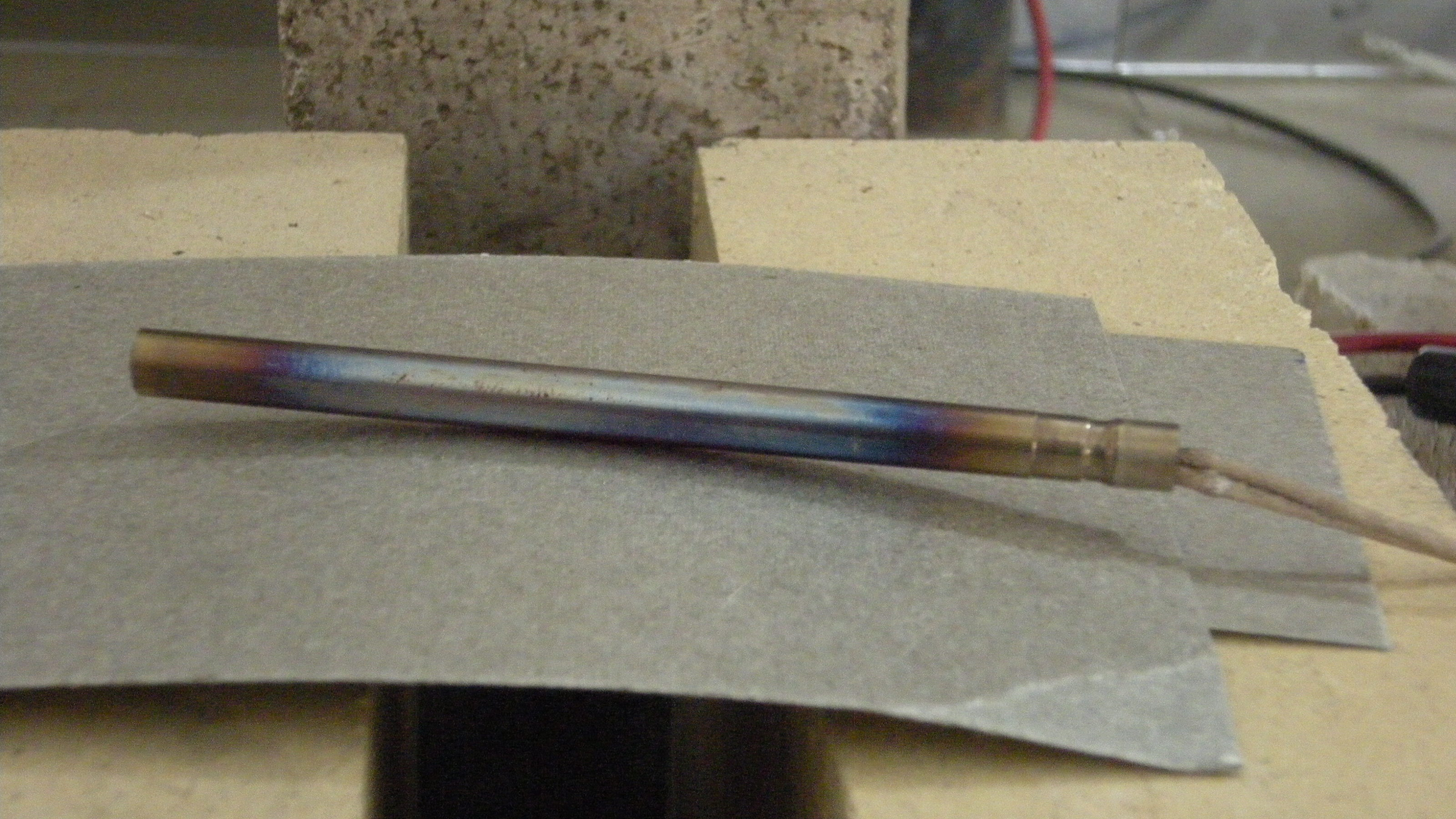
Cold cartridge heater

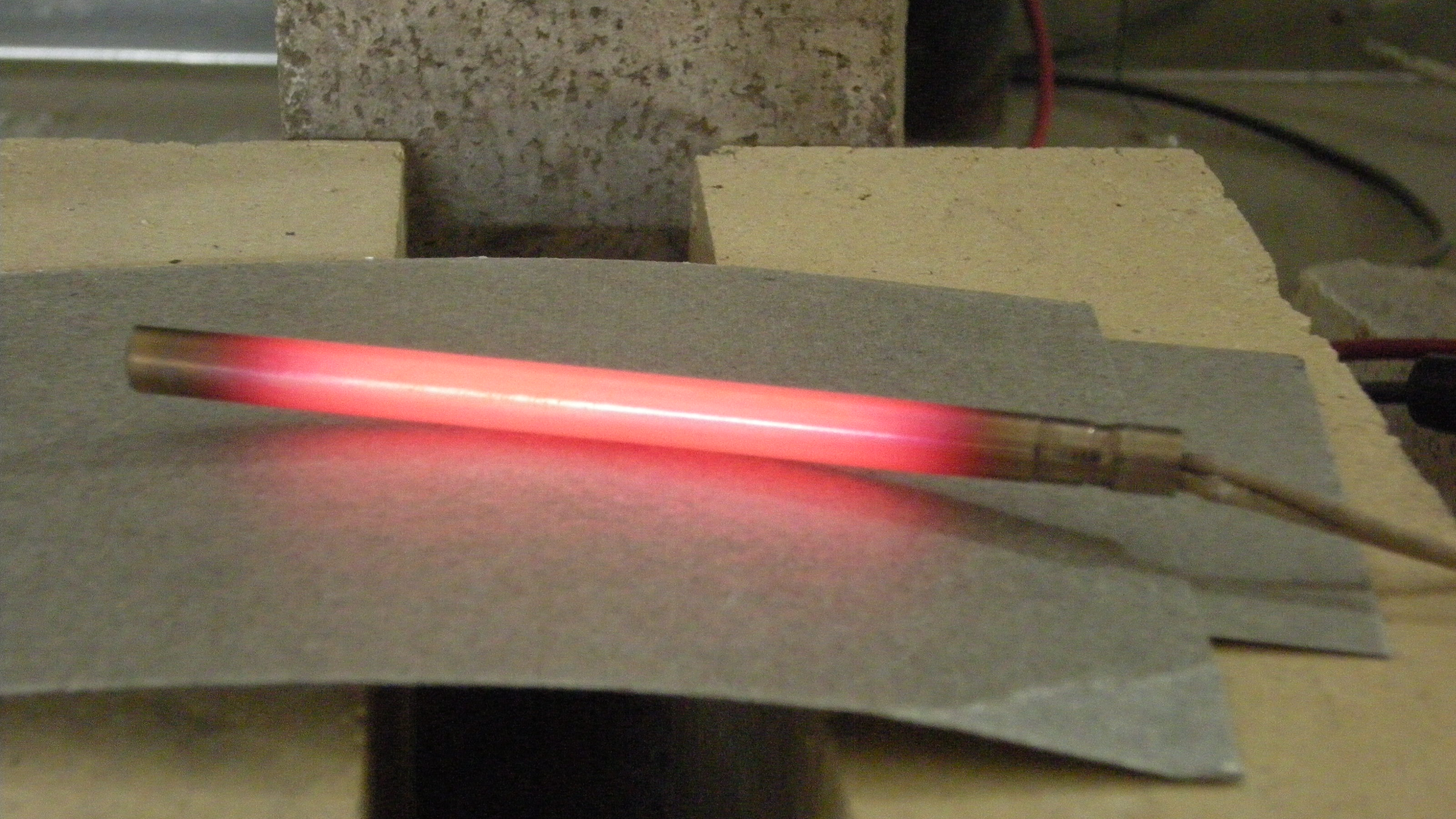
Hot cartridge heater

== Construction ==
Construction of a cartridge heater may be divided in 7 main parts:

- Heating coil
- Insulation
- Sheath
- Sealing
- Termination
- Lead wire type
- Watt density

=== Heating coil ===
The heating coil is the actual resistance which is where the electrical load occurs. The most common type of metal alloy used for this purpose is a nickel-chromium mixture, also known as nichrome. The nichrome wire is wound around a ceramic core, and the number of spirals per inch vary according to the requested watt density. Potential from an alternating current source, which can either be 2 phase or 3 phase, flows through the coiled nichrome wire, heating up the wire, which in turn, heats the cartridge heater sheath.

=== Insulation ===
Insulation is used to prevent the nichrome coil contacting the sheath, an event that would ground the resistance and could produce a catastrophic short circuit, resulting in a melted sheath and a major equipment failure. Damage can be mitigated by installing a ground fault interrupting circuit. To prevent the coil from touching the sheath, the coil is inserted into the sheath, and immediately filled with magnesium oxide (MgO). To ensure the MgO fills the empty space between the sheath and the coil, the cartridge heater is filled under vibration.

=== Sheath ===
The sheath is the part of the cartridge heater which makes contact with the material or substance to be heated. Several metal alloys are used, depending on the type of application, such as highly acidic or corrosive environments. The most common types of sheaths are 304 stainless steel, 316 stainless steel, and incoloy 800. Incoloy has the highest temperature rating and is considered a superalloy.

=== Sealing ===
After the cartridge heater has been filled with MgO, a seal is applied to the open end of the cartridge heater (where the nichrome coil was introduced). This prevents the coil and the MgO from coming out, as well as preventing contaminants such as plastic debris, air, or moisture from entering the heater.

=== Termination ===
Since cartridge heaters are installed in a wide variety of machines, manufacturers must design the heaters to meet certain clearances. The cartridge heaters might be terminated with the leads coming out straight, or in a right angle. Also, manufacturers must be careful that the leads are not exposed to temperatures higher than the maximum rating for the lead wire. In order to prevent lead wire damage from temperature, movement or contamination, the lead wire can be protected with a metal conduit, braided metal or silicone sleeves.

=== Lead wire type ===
Depending on the clearance and the design of the machine where the cartridge heater will be inserted, the type of wire used will vary. Fiberglass is the commonly used for cartridge heaters and other high-temperature applications, such as automotive wiring harnesses and industrial equipment. Other variants used are silicone impregnated fiberglass and silicone rubber.

== Customization options ==
Some of the more common cartridge heater customizations include:

- Internal thermocouples
- Flanges
- Threaded bushings
- Epoxy seals
- Leadwire termination options
- Mica tape leads
- Stainless steel braid or armor
- Lead area sealing
- Distributed wattage
- No-heat sections
- Three-phase construction
- Dual voltage
- Zoned heaters
- Square cartridge heaters
- Flexible cartridge heaters
