= LS Cable & System =

South Korean industrial corporation

LS Cable & System Ltd.

- LS Tower, headquarters of LS Cable & System in Anyang, South Korea
- Native name: 엘에스전선 주식회사
- Company type: Private limited
- Founded: 1962; 64 years ago
- Headquarters: Anyang, South Korea
- Key people: Cha-yub Koo (Chairman)
- Products: Power cables, telecommunication cables
- Revenue: $7,668.09 million (2011)
- Total assets: $5,102.92 million (2011)
- Total equity: $551.58 million (2011)
- Number of employees: 9,168
- Parent: LS Group
- Website: www.lscns.com

LS Cable & System (Korean: LS전선, 엘에스전선) is a South Korea-based industrial corporation with global operations and one of the biggest cable manufacturers worldwide. Its products comprise power and telecommunication cables and systems, as well as integrated modules and other related industrial materials. LS Cable & System furthermore provides engineering services, installation and commissioning of high voltage and extra high voltage landlines as well as turnkey submarine cabling project execution.

LS Cable & System (LS C&S) has its headquarters at the LS Tower in Anyang and nine domestic factories of which six are located in Gumi, two in Donghae and one in Anyang. Additionally LS C&S has nine other factories in China, Malaysia, Vietnam and India. Furthermore, LS C&S owns magnet wire and data cable manufacturer Superior Essex with 24 factories spread over North America, Europe and China. LS C&S sales subsidiaries and branches overseas are located in Asia, the Middle East, Africa, Europe and in the Americas. LS C&S also owns JS Cable, Gaeon Cable, Pountek, Global Cable Incorporated, Kospace and Alutek, all of them with factories in Korea.

== History ==
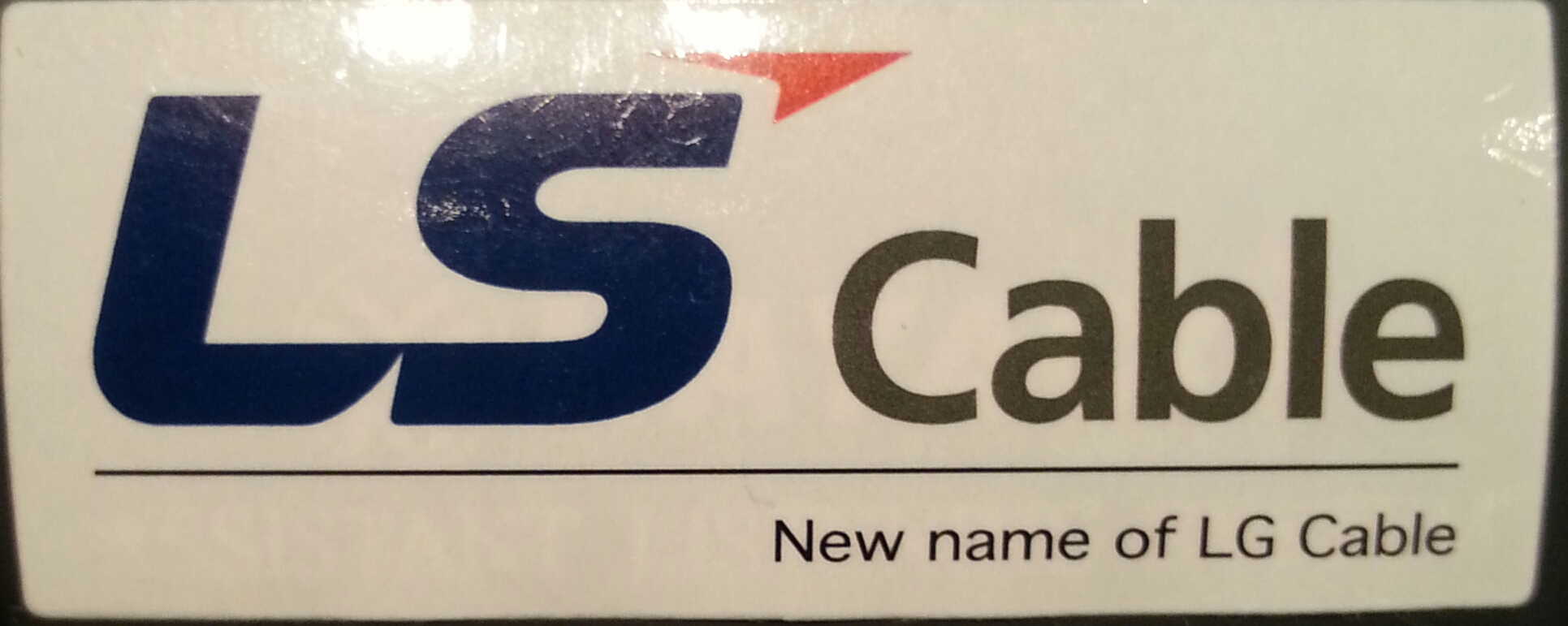
LS Cable sticker indicating the name change from LG Cable to LS Cable

LS Cable & System was founded as Korea Cable Industry in May 1962 and became Goldstar Cable in 1969.

It was then known as LG (Lucky Goldstar) Cable until it separated from the LG Group in November 2003 to lead an independent brand power. It was established as its own cable company, LS Cable, in March 2005 as a part of the newly formed LS Group.

On June 11, 2008, LS Cable announced the purchase of Atlanta-based magnet wire and communication cable maker Superior Essex. The transaction, valued at roughly $900 million, extends LS Cable's reach into North American and European markets.

In March 2011 LS Cable was renamed and thus became LS Cable & System.

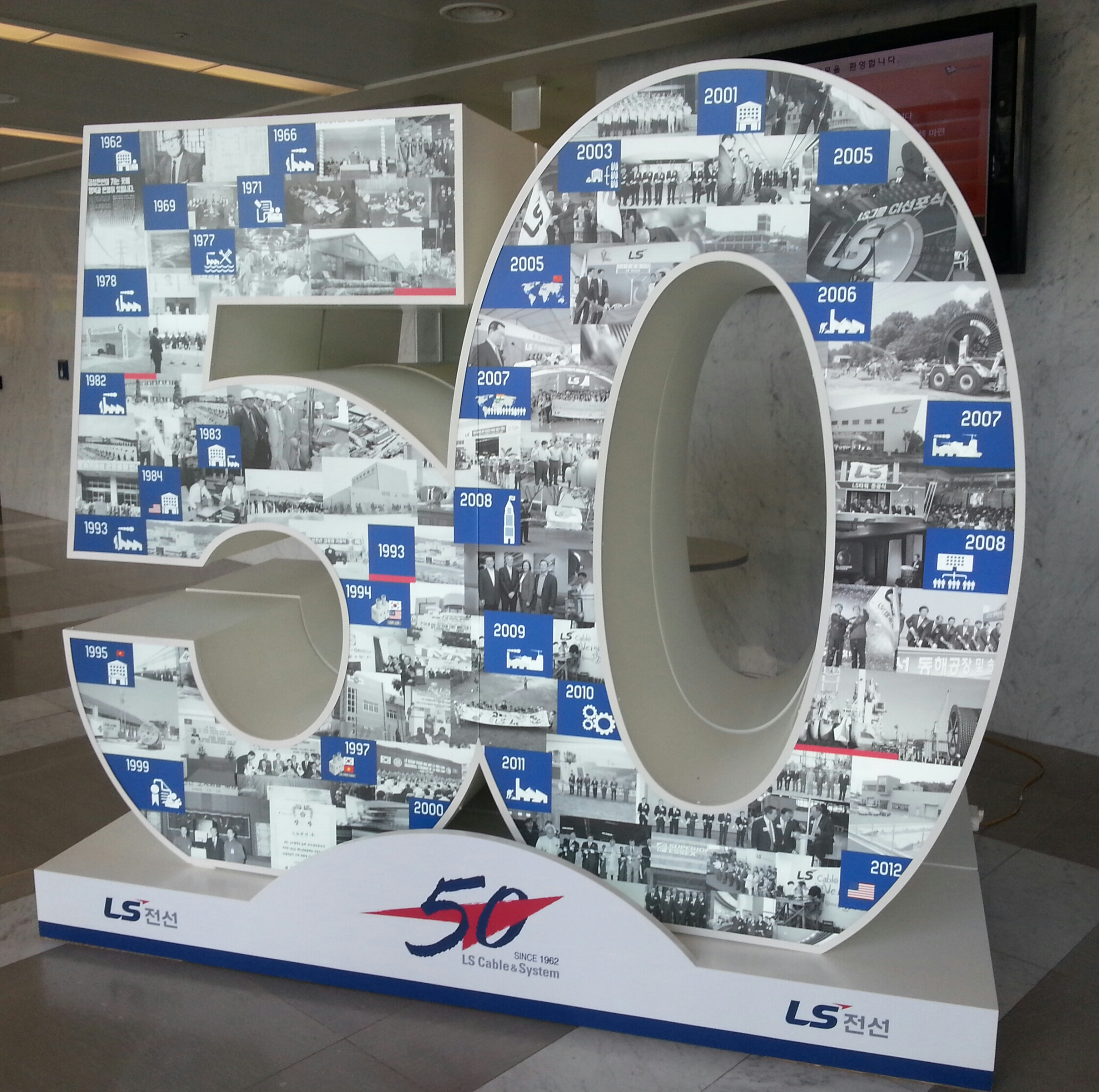
50 depicting LS Cable & System's 50 years of history from 1962 to 2012

== Products ==
=== Energy cables & systems ===
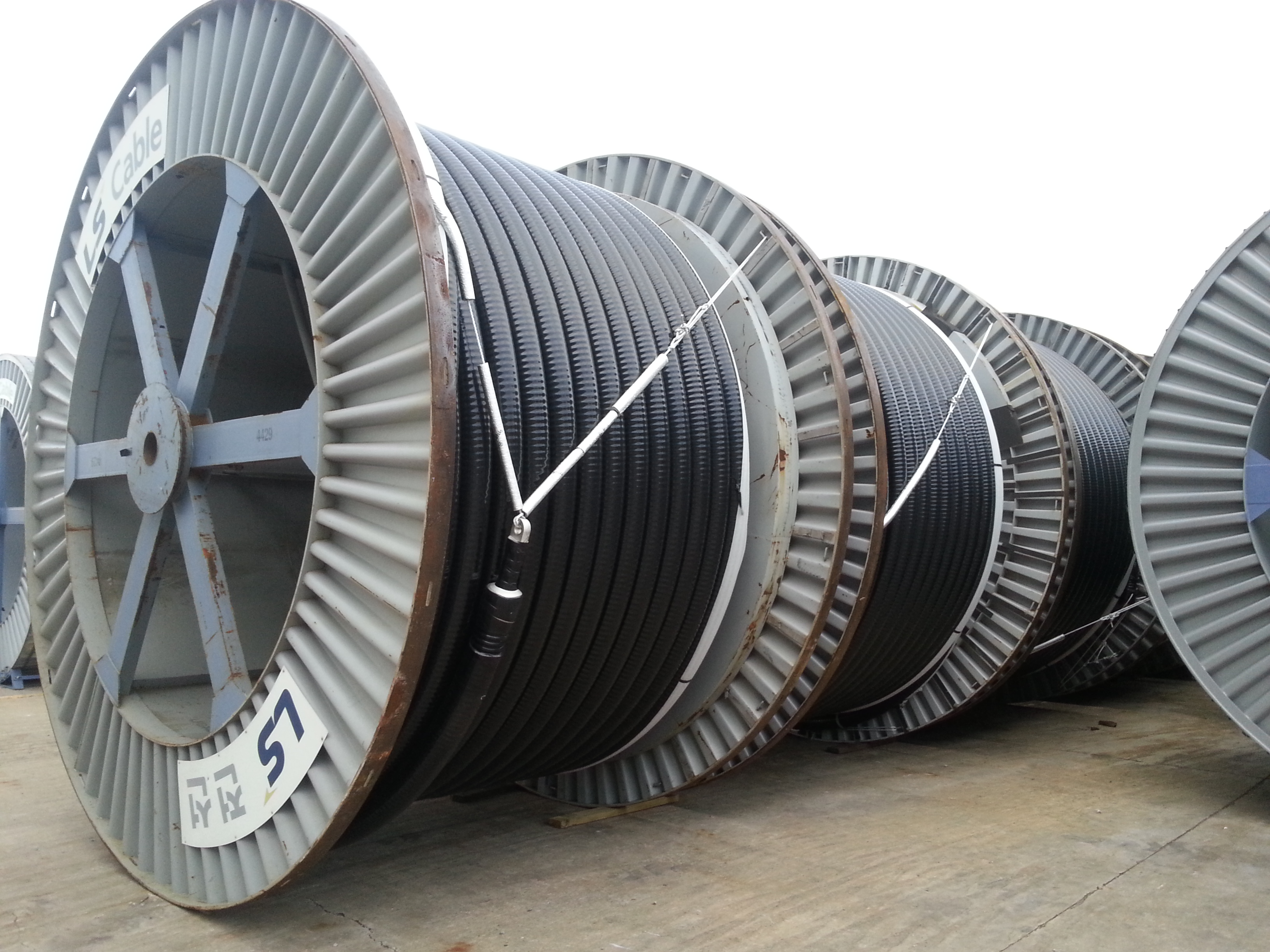
345 kV high voltage cables manufactured by LS Cable & System

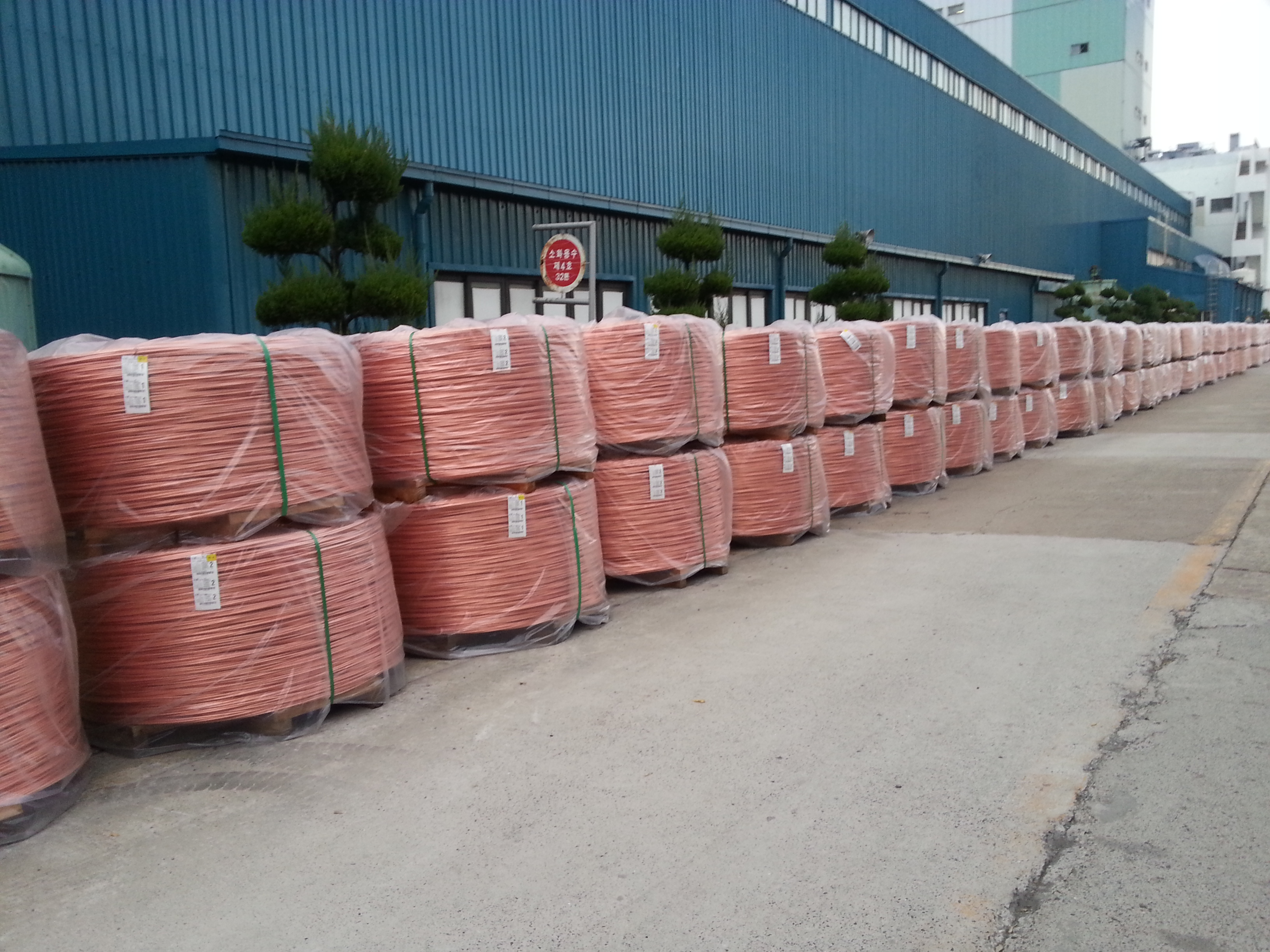
Copper wire rod produced at the LS C&S factory in Gumi, South Korea

- LV, MV, HV & EHV power transmission & distribution cables & systems
- Submarine cables, accessories, systems, engineering, installation & commissioning
- Industrial & specialty cables & systems
- Overhead power lines
- Busduct & accessories

=== Telecommunication cables, components ===
- Optical fiber, optical fiber cable
- Components and apparatus
- LAN cable, radio frequency
- FTTH, system integration

=== Integrated modules & cables ===
- Industrial cable & module
- Automotive wire
- Tube components
- HV connectors

=== Industrial materials ===
- Copper wire rod
- Aluminum materials
- Rubber flooring tile

=== Magnet wire & copper data cables ===
- Magnet wires
- Copper data cables

== Branches ==
=== Africa ===
- Egypt: Cairo
- South Africa: Johannesburg

=== America ===
- Brazil: São Paulo
- Mexico: Mexico City
- Peru: Lima
- United States: Tarboro

=== Asia ===
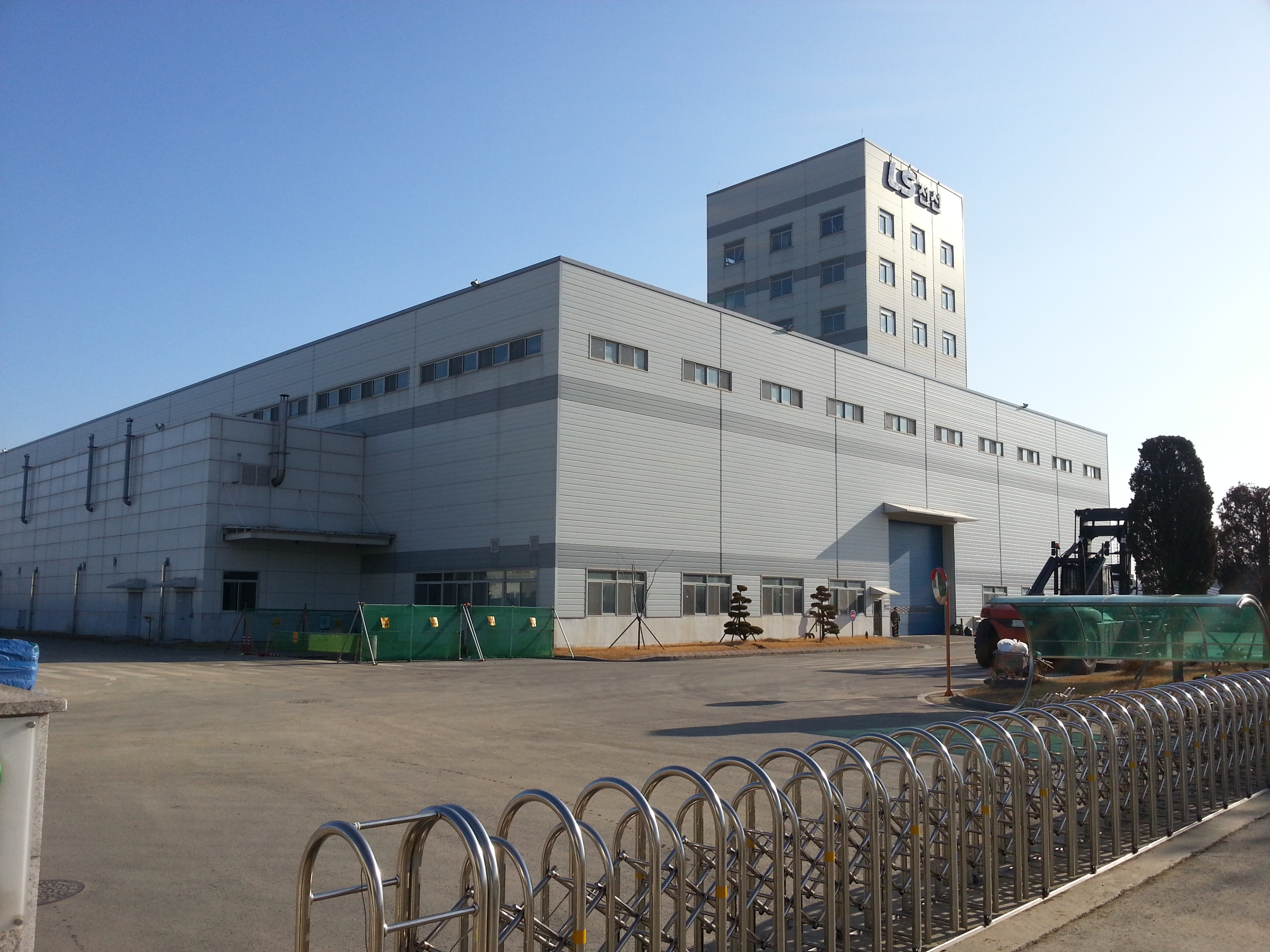
One of the factories of LS Cable & System (located in Donghae, South Korea)

- Bangladesh: Dhaka
- India: Gurugram, Haryana, Bangalore, Chennai, Hyderabad, Kolkata, Mumbai
- Indonesia: Jakarta
- Philippines: Manila
- Singapore: Singapore
- South Korea: Anyang, Busan, Daegu, Daejeon, Donghae, Gumi, Gwangju

=== Europe ===
- Russia: Moscow

=== Middle East ===
- United Arab Emirates: Abu Dhabi
- Saudi Arabia: Riyadh
- Iran: Tehran

=== Oceania ===
- Australia: Sydney

== Subsidiaries ==
=== Asia ===
- China: LSHQ (ownership: 75.1%) in Yichang, LSIC (100%) in Peking, Shanghai, Guangzhou and Xi'an, LSCT (87.5%) in Tianjin, LSCW (100%) in Wuxi
- India: LSCD in New Delhi, LSCI (100%) in Haryana
- Japan: LSCJ (100%) in Tokyo
- Malaysia: LSCM (100%) in Penang
- South Korea: JS Cable Co. (69.9%), Global Cable Incorporated Co. (98.2%), Alutek Co. (100%), Pountek Co. (100%), Kospace Co. (99.2%)
- Vietnam: LS-VINA Cable & System (84.8%) in Haiphong, LSCV Offices located in (100%) in Ho Chi Minh City and Hanoi City, UTP & Fiber factory in Dong Nai
- Myanmar: LS-Gaon Cable Myanmar (LSGM) in Yangon, LS-Gaon Cable Myanmar Trading (LSGMT) in Yangon
- Indonesia: LS-AG Cable Indonesia (LSAG) in Karawang, PT LSAG Cable Indonesia (LSAG) in Karawang

=== Europe ===
- United Kingdom: LSCNSU (100%) in London

=== North America ===
- United States: LS Cable America, Inc. (100%) in Fort Lee, NJ, and LS Cable & System USA (81%) in Atlanta, Georgia

== Trade fairs ==
In 2012 LS Cable & System participated for the first time in the company's history in the InnoTrans, a trade fair with focus on the rail transport industry, by exhibiting its railway related products.

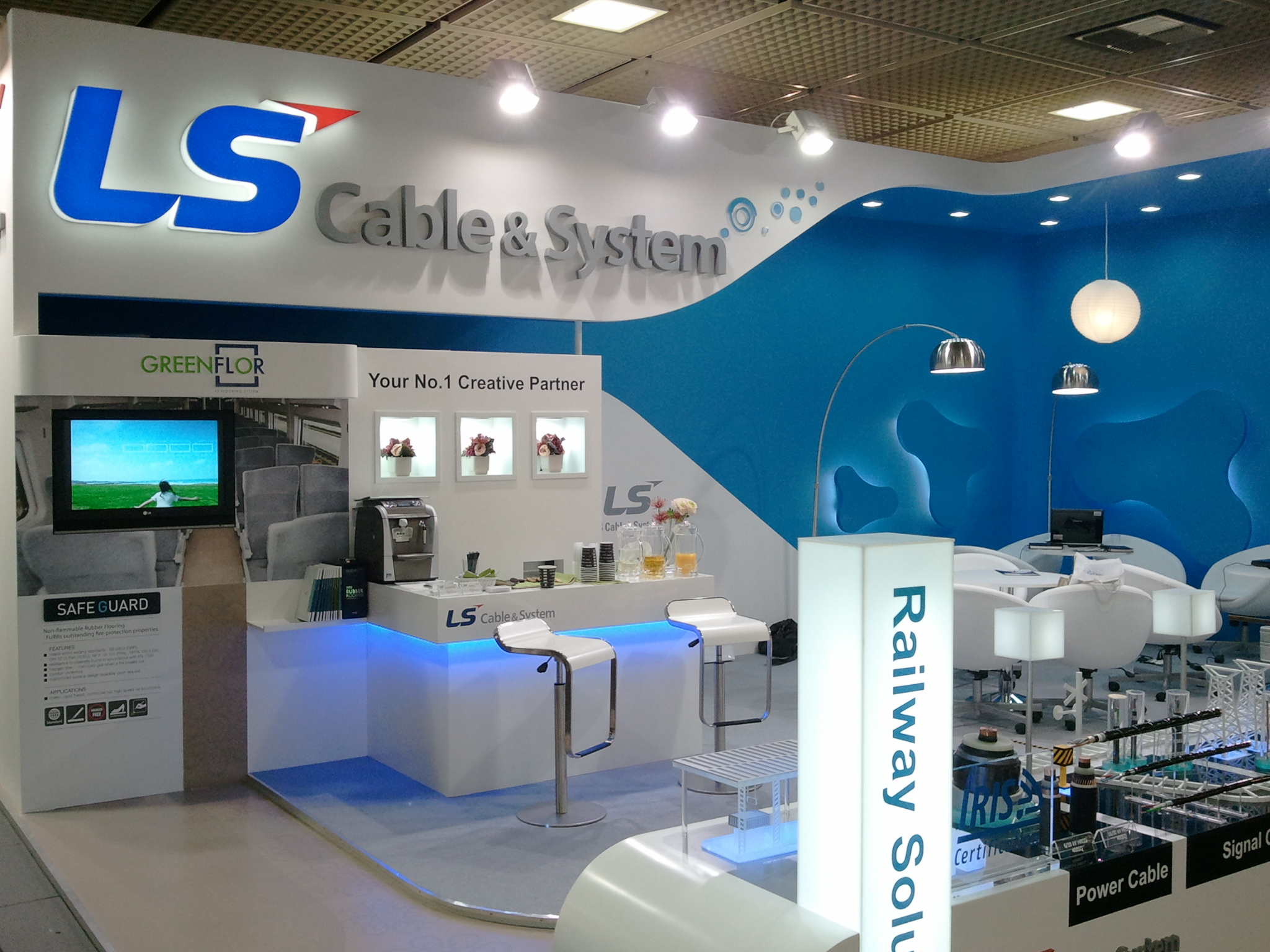
Booth of LS Cable & System at the InnoTrans 2012 in Berlin, Germany

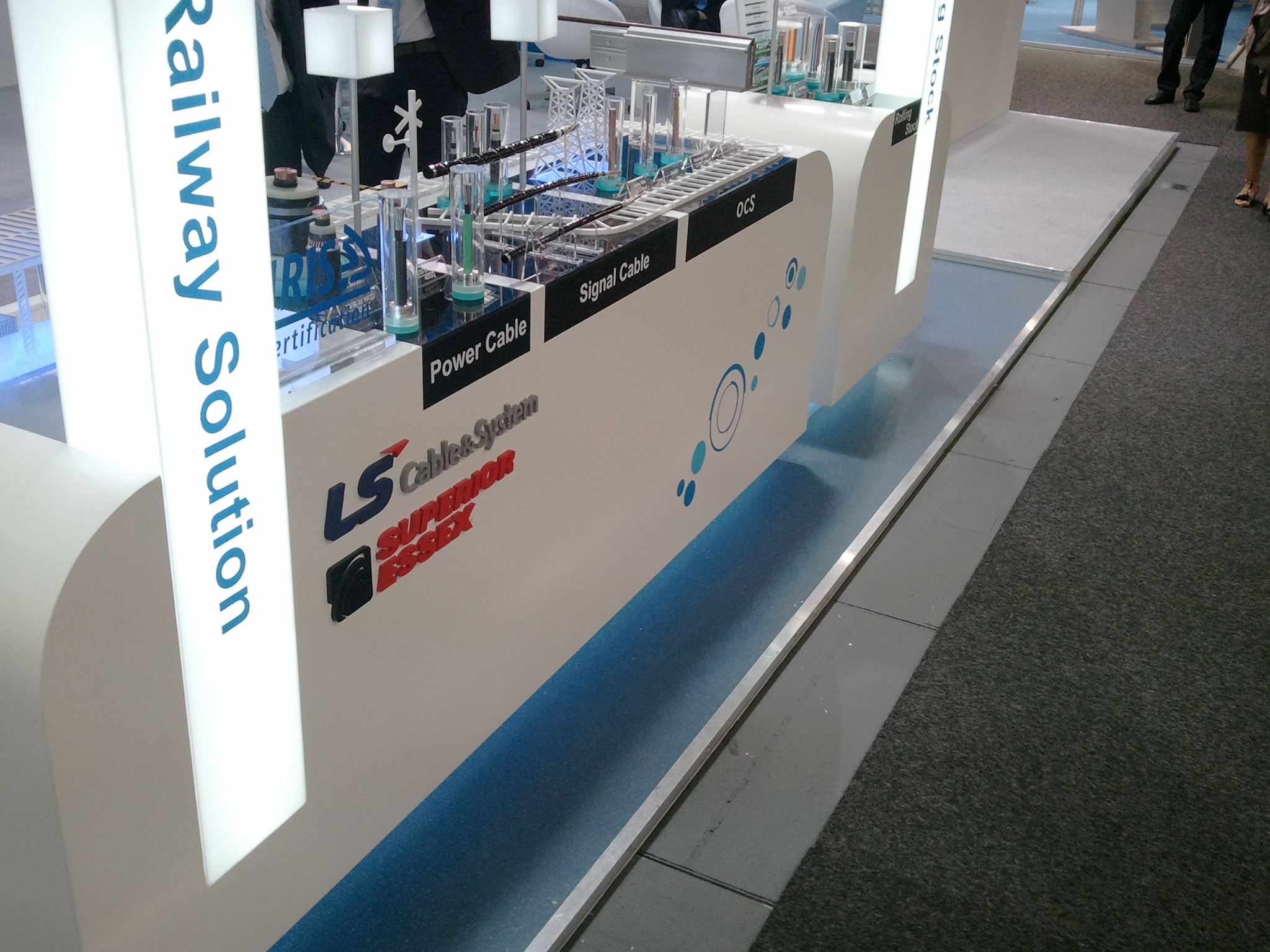
LS Cable & System Railway Cables as shown at their booth at the InnoTrans 2012 in Berlin, Germany

== Sponsoring activities ==
LS Cable & System is sponsoring Seoul's 700 Yachting Club Racing Team. Thanks to the sponsoring the Yachting Club was able to upgrade one of its Yamaha 31 Festa yachts to enable it to participate in International Class and Offshore Racing Class (ORC) races. The LS C&S boat came third in the Korea Cup 2012 in the category "Leg 1" and ranked third in the BMW Cup as well.

Also, the Yachting Club participated in various additional races with the LS C&S yacht, such as the Yellow Sea International Yacht Race, the Han River International Yacht Race 2012 and the Subaru Za Cup Tokyo Bay Open 2012.

LS Cable & System Yamaha 31 Festa Yacht at the Korea Cup in May 2012

LS Cable & System Yamaha 31 Festa Yacht at the BMW Cup in June 2012

== See also ==
- Economy of South Korea
