= Buhler Industries =

Canadian farm equipment manufacturer

Buhler Industries Inc.
- Type: Subsidiary
- Traded as: TSX: BUI
- Industry: Farm & Construction Machinery
- Headquarters: Winnipeg, Manitoba, Canada
- Key people: Marat Nogerov, President
- Owner: ASKO Holding; (2023–present)
- Number of employees: 1100
- Parent: Basak Traktor
- Divisions: Versatile & Farm King
- Website: www.buhlerindustries.com

Buhler Industries, Inc. is a company founded in 1969 that manufactures machinery used on farms and construction. Headquartered in Winnipeg, Manitoba, Canada, it operates a total of eight factories in Canada and the United States.

On December 28, 2023, ASKO Holding acquired 97% of the company's common shares, as well as holding all of its outstanding debt. ASKO is the parent of Basak Traktor in Turkey.

== History ==
Buhler Industries Inc. was established in 1969 when John Buhler purchased "Standard Gas Engine Works", which was founded in 1932. The company produced the Farm King line of grain augers, snowblowers, mowers and compact implements. Buhler Industries expanded in 1982 with the purchase of the Allied line of front-end loaders and the company began trading on the TSE in 1994, at which time all products were marketed under the "Buhler" brand name.

The company acquired the Versatile Tractor division of New Holland Ag in the year 2000. Buhler purchased the Versatile tractor plant with a $32-million government loan. According to labour historian Doug Smith, Buhler "provoked a strike by demanding a gutting of benefits and seniority provisions in the union contract". The result was a prolonged strike that almost crippled the plant. However, the union took Buhler to the Manitoba Labour Board charging bargaining in bad faith and won a $6-million dollar settlement.

Buhler pledged $5 million to build a performing arts centre in 2005 at the Morden Collegiate high school in Morden, Manitoba. The donation was eventually withdrawn in the face of community opposition to the project and cost overruns.

In 2001, the company endured a strike, in which "Over 250 men, all of them with at least twenty years of experience, lost their jobs."

However, recent years have been marked by declining sales and slumping share prices: “Over the course of the last two years, annual sales have fallen by nearly 27 per cent, from $312 million in 2017 to $229.1 million for its year ending Sept. 30” In 2019, share prices declined by 19%.

In March 2014, there were calls for sanctions against several Russian members of Buhler's board of directors in connection to Vladamir Putin's actions in Crimea. Konstantin Babkin, Yury Ryazanov and Dmitry Udras are connected to Rostselmash Ltd. and are said to be members of Russia's Action Party. According to media reports, a video has recently emerged from a rally in Moscow that shows Babkin publicly supporting Russian President Vladimir Putin's actions in Ukraine. In March 2014, the Ukrainian-Canadian Congress called for an investigation of the Russian members of Buhler's board of directors. No action was taken and no sanctions were placed on Buhler Industries or the board of directors.

John Buhler was made a Member of the Order of Canada (CM) in June 2012 with the citation: "For his contributions as an entrepreneur and philanthropist to education, health care and arts organizations in his province as an entrepreneur and philanthropist."
