= Versatile (company) =

Canadian agricultural machinery manufacturer

Versatile Incorporated
- Type: Subsidiary
- Industry: Agricultural machinery
- Founded: 1963
- Founder: Peter Pakosh, Roy Robinson
- Headquarters: 1260 Clarence Avenue, Winnipeg, Manitoba, Canada
- Products: Tractors, Tillage Implements
- Parent: Basak Traktor
- Website: https://www.versatile-ag.com/NA/pages/

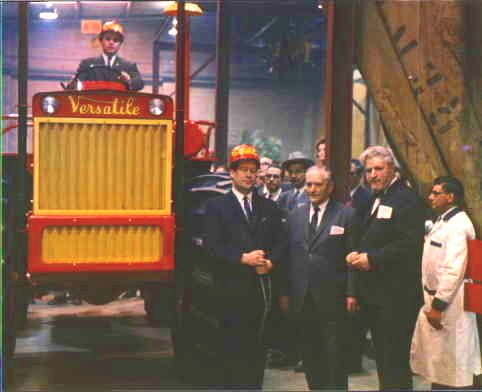
Peter Pakosh, (third from right) and Roy Robinson (second from right), unveil a new Versatile D118 at a plant expansion ceremony in 1967.

Versatile is a Canadian agricultural machinery manufacturer. The company was founded in 1963 by Peter Pakosh and Roy Robinson in Winnipeg, Manitoba, Canada. At one time it had 70% of the 4WD tractor market.

== History ==
Versatile was the first company to mass-produce articulated four-wheel-drive tractors, starting in 1966 with the D100 and G100 four-wheel drives. Those ground-breaking tractors were primitive by modern standards, with a 6-cylinder diesel or 8-cylinder gas engine producing 100 horsepower. 1966 models sold for less than CA$10,000.

Daniel Pakosh also developed the first bi-directional tractor in the world. The Versatile 150 launched in 1977.

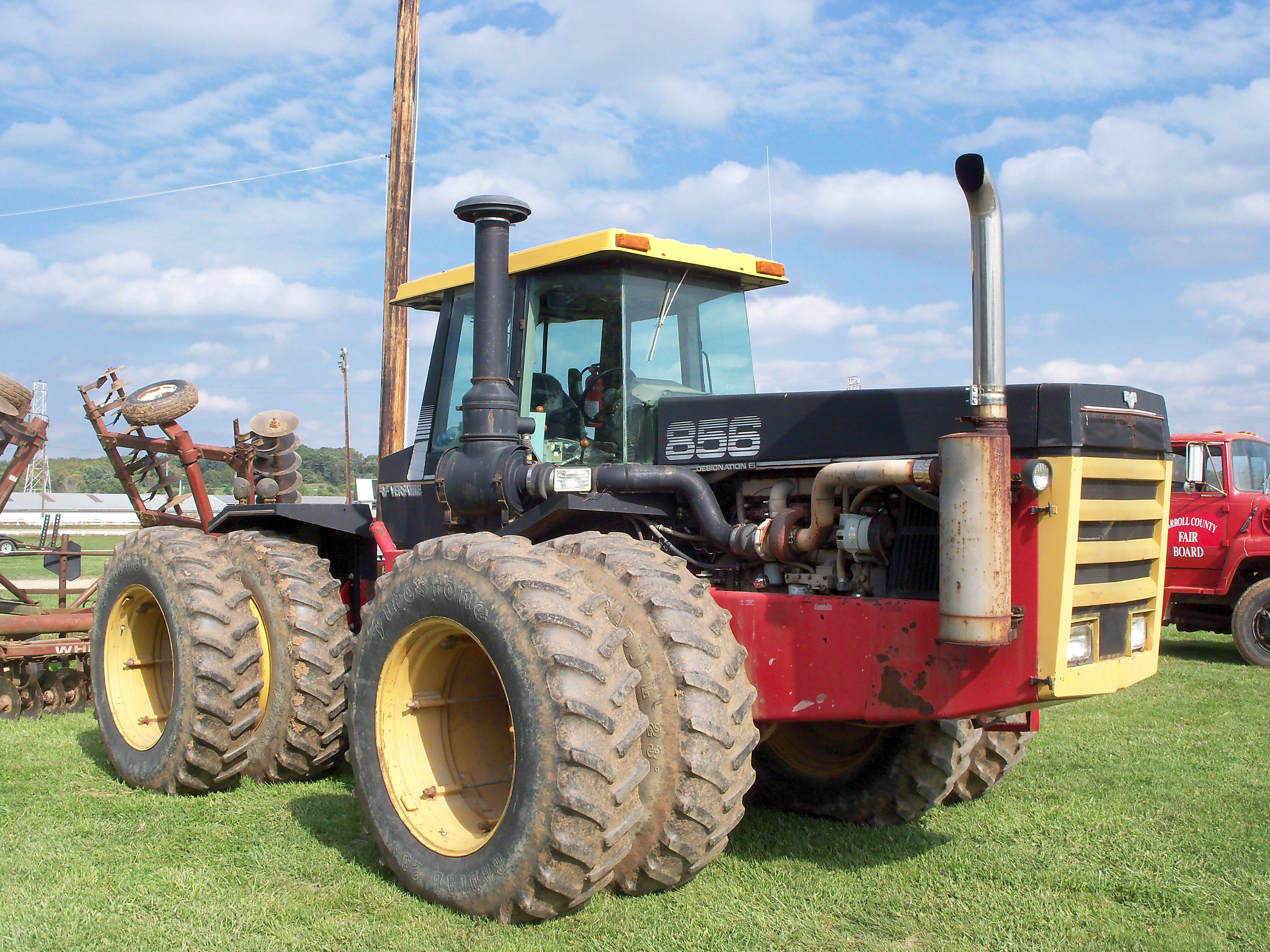
A Versatile 856 tractor in Carrollton, Ohio

The Versatile brand, known historically for four-wheel drive tractors, has expanded to include front-wheel assist tractors after acquiring the rights to a few of New Hollands tractors during the CNH merger, self-propelled sprayers, precision seeding & tillage equipment, and combines. In its earlier days (1970s to 1980s), the company made iconic tractors colored red, yellow, and black. The tractors were also known for their flat, boxy appearance, and hardly any curvature as seen on modern tractors. An example of this, the Versatile 856, is to the left.

Four-wheel drive demand increased significantly, with Versatile becoming one of the leaders in four-wheel-drive development and production. By the late 1970s, the Versatile lineup included tractors ranging from 220 to 330 horsepower. With the 1980s came an expanded line of four-wheel-drive tractors that stretched to 470 horsepower in the Versatile 1150. They entered the race to build the largest tractor in the world with "Big Roy", named after one of the founders, in 1977. Roy produced 600 HP on the draw bar.

In 1987, Ford-New Holland bought Versatile. Ford New Holland quickly started assimilating the Versatile range of tractors, the decals were replaced with the Ford name and Versatile name was reduced in size and placed below the model number. Additionally, the iconic Versatile colors were replaced with the blue and white of the Ford tractors. Throughout Versatile's time under Ford-New Holland, various changes and updates were made to the line. Two of the most notable changes were the transition from the flat square sheetmetal, to a more rounded and modernized design, and the addition of a powershift transmission.

In 1991, Fiat Geotech purchased Ford New Holland to create New Holland. Then in 1999, New Holland merged with Case Corporation to create CNH Global. As part of this merger, Versatile had to be sold, as the Case Corporation had the Steiger brand since 1986. Versatile was sold to Buhler Industries Incorporated, returning the iconic red to the tractors, but replacing yellow with white.

On November 1, 2007, Combine manufacturer Rostselmash Inc. acquired 80% of the common shares of Versatile and it was announced that the Versatile brand name will again be the sole name associated with the tractor division.

In 2016, Versatile expanded its tractor range by adding the DeltaTrack system of four tracks replacement of the wheels on their Articulated tractors. In 2017 Versatile returned to its iconic color scheme of red, yellow, and black.

In August 2022, Versatile announced plans for a hydrogen powered tractor, using a 15L Cummins engine.

In early 2024, it was announced that RostSelMash had sold all shares of Versatile (Buhler Industries) to Turkish-based Basak Traktor.

== Models ==
=== 4 Wheel Drives (Articulated) ===
Model	Gross HP Rating	Year(s) Manufactured	Engine Make and Displacement
D100	100 HP	1966	Ford 5.9L - 6 Cylinder
G100	100 HP	1966	Chrysler 5.2L - 8 Cylinder Gasoline
118	118 HP	1967-1971	Cummins 5.8L - 6 Cylinder
125	125 HP	1967-1968	Ford 6.4L - 8 Cylinder Gasoline
145	145 HP	1967-1971	Cummins 7.7L - 8 Cylinder
700	210 HP	1972-1977	Cummins 9.1L - 8 Cylinder
750	220 HP	1976-1977	Cummins 14.0L - 6 Cylinder
756	190 HP	1986	Cummins 8.3L - 6 Cylinder
900	300 HP	1972-1977	Cummins 14.8L - 8 Cylinder
300	155 HP	1973	Cummins 6.2L - 6 Cylinder
800	235 HP	1973-1977	Cummins 14.0L - 6 Cylinder
825	250 HP	1977	Cummins 14.0L - 6 Cylinder
846	230 HP	1988-1993	Cummins 10.0L 6-cyl diesel
850	250 HP	1973-1977	Cummins 14.0L - 6 Cylinder
500	192 HP	1977-1979	Cummins 8.3L - 8 Cylinder
950	350 HP	1977-1982	Cummins 14.8L - 8 Cylinder
1080 (Big Roy)	600 HP	1977	Cummins 18.8L - 6 Cylinder
835	230 HP	1978-1984	Cummins 14.0L - 6 Cylinder
855	250 HP	1978-1983	Cummins 14.0L - 6 Cylinder
875	280 HP	1978-1984	Cummins 14.0L - 6 Cylinder
555	210 HP	1979-1984	Cummins 9.1L - 8 Cylinder
895	310 HP	1980-1984	Cummins 14.0L - 6 Cylinder
1150	470 HP	1981-1985	Cummins 18.8L - 6 Cylinder
1156	470 HP	1986-1991	Cummins 18.8L - 6 Cylinder
945	335 HP	1983-1984	Cummins 14.0L - 6 Cylinder
946	325 HP	1987-1993	Cummins 14.0L - 6 Cylinder
955	350 HP	1983-1984	Cummins 14.0L - 6 Cylinder
975	360 HP	1983-1984	Cummins 14.0L - 6 Cylinder
836	210 HP	1985-1986	Cummins 10.0L 6-cyl diesel
856	240 HP	1985	Cummins 10.0L 6-cyl diesel
876	280 HP	1985-1993	Cummins 10.0L 6-cyl diesel
936	310 HP	1985-1988	Cummins 14.0L - 6 Cylinder
956	335 HP	1985	Cummins 14.0L - 6 Cylinder
976	360 HP	1985-1993	Cummins 14.0L - 6 Cylinder
2240	240 HP	2002-2003	Cummins 8.3L - 6 Cylinder
2270	270 HP	2002-2003	Cummins 10.8L - 6 Cylinder
2310	310 HP	2002-2003	Cummins 10.8L - 6 Cylinder
2360	360 HP	2002-2008	Cummins 14.0L - 6 Cylinder
2425	425 HP	2002-2008	Cummins 14.0L - 6 Cylinder
305	305 HP	2008-2011	Cummins 10.8L - 6 Cylinder
340	340 HP	2008-2011	Cummins 10.8L - 6 Cylinder
375	375 HP	2008-2011	Cummins 10.8L - 6 Cylinder
400	400 HP	2008-2011	Cummins 10.8L - 6 Cylinder
435	435 HP	2008-2011	Cummins 14.9L - 6 Cylinder
485	485 HP	2008-2011	Cummins 14.9L - 6 Cylinder
535	535 HP	2008-2011	Cummins 14.9L - 6 Cylinder
575	575 HP	2008-2011	Cummins 14.9L - 6 Cylinder
350	350 HP	2012-2017	Cummins 11.9L - 6 Cylinder
375	375 HP	2012-2017	Cummins 11.9L - 6 Cylinder
400	400 HP	2012-2017	Cummins 11.9L - 6 Cylinder
450	450 HP	2012-2017	Cummins 14.9L - 6 Cylinder
450DT	450 HP DeltaTrack	2013-2017	Cummins 14.9L - 6 Cylinder
500	500 HP	2012-2017	Cummins 14.9L - 6 Cylinder
500DT	500 HP DeltaTrack	2013-2017	Cummins 14.9L - 6 Cylinder
550	550 HP	2012-2017	Cummins 14.9L - 6 Cylinder
550DT	550 HP DeltaTrack	2013-2017	Cummins 14.9L - 6 Cylinder
405	400 HP	2018-Present	Cummins 11.8L - 6 Cylinder
430	430 HP	2018-Present	Cummins 11.8L - 6 Cylinder
460	460 HP	2018-Present	Cummins 11.8L - 6 Cylinder
530	530 HP	2018-Present	Cummins 14.9L - 6 Cylinder
530DT	530 HP DeltaTrack	2018-Present	Cummins 14.9L - 6 Cylinder
580	580 HP	2018-Present	Cummins 14.9L - 6 Cylinder
580DT	580 HP DeltaTrack	2018-Present	Cummins 14.9L - 6 Cylinder
620	616 HP	2018-Present	Cummins 14.9L - 6 Cylinder
620DT	616 HP DeltaTrack	2018-Present	Cummins 14.9L - 6 Cylinder

=== Bi-Directional Tractors ===
Model	Gross HP Rating	Year(s) Manufactured	Engine Make and Displacement
160	84 HP	1982-1983	Waukesha 3.6L - 4 Cylinder
150	71 HP	1977-1981	Perkins 3.9L - 4 Cylinder
256	101 HP	1984-1985	Cummins 3.9L - 4 Cylinder
276	117 HP	1985-1990	Cummins 3.9L - 4 Cylinder
9030	116 HP	1990-1997	Ford 4.4L - 4 Cylinder

=== MFWD Tractors ===
Model	Gross HP Rating	Year(s) Manufactured	Engine Make and Displacement
2145	195 HP	2000-2008	Ford 7.5L - 6 Cylinder
2160	225 HP	2000-2008	Ford 7.5L - 6 Cylinder
2180	260 HP	2000-2008	Ford 7.5L - 6 Cylinder
2210	275 HP	2000-2008	Ford 7.5L - 6 Cylinder
190	190 HP	2010-2014	Cummins 6.7L - 6 Cylinder
220	220 HP	2010-2014	Cummins 6.7L - 6 Cylinder
250	250 HP	2009-2014	Cummins 8.3L - 6 Cylinder
280	280 HP	2009-2014	Cummins 8.3L - 6 Cylinder
305	305 HP	2012-2014	Cummins 8.3L - 6 Cylinder
260	260 HP	2014-2017	Cummins 8.9L - 6 Cylinder
290	290 HP	2014-2017	Cummins 8.9L - 6 Cylinder
310	310 HP	2014-2017	Cummins 8.9L - 6 Cylinder
265	265 HP	2018-Present	Cummins 8.9L - 6 Cylinder
295	295 HP	2018-Present	Cummins 8.9L - 6 Cylinder
315	315 HP	2018-Present	Cummins 8.9L - 6 Cylinder
335	335 HP	2018-Present	Cummins 8.9L - 6 Cylinder
365	365 HP	2018-Present	Cummins 8.9L - 6 Cylinder
175 Nemesis	175 HP	2020-Present	Cummins 6.7L - 6 Cylinder
195 Nemesis	195 HP	2020-Present	Cummins 6.7L - 6 Cylinder
210 Nemesis	210 HP	2020-Present	Cummins 6.7L - 6 Cylinder

== See also ==
- Steiger Tractor similar American company that pioneered large four-wheel drive tractor production from the 1960s.
