= Babkin =

Babkin (Russian: Бабкин) is a Russian masculine surname, its feminine counterpart is Babkina. It may refer to

- Boris Babkin (1877–1950), Russian-born physiologist
- Elīna Babkina (born 1989), Latvian basketball player for Israeli team Elitzur Ramla
- Kateryna Babkina (born 1985), Ukrainian writer
- Konstantin Babkin (born 1971), Russian businessman and politician
- Nadezhda Babkina (born 1950), Soviet and Russian folk and pop singer
- Serhii Babkin (born 1978), Ukrainian singer

== See also ==
- 10684 Babkina, a minor planet named after singer Nadezhda Babkina
