= Rostov Metro =

Planned rapid transit system in Russia

Overview
- Native name: Росто́вский метрополите́н
- Locale: Rostov-on-Don, Russian Federation
- Transit type: Metro

Technical
- Track gauge: 1,520 mm (4 ft 11 27/32 in)
- Electrification: 825 V DC third rail
- Average speed: 41.61 km/h (25.86 mph)

Rostov Metro (Russian: Ростовский Метрополитен) is a planned rapid transit system in Rostov-on-Don, Russia. As of October 2008, the city authorities were redesigning the historical proposal (created in the 1980s) at the request of the federal government. Construction was to begin no earlier than 2016 if the federal government had approved financing of the project.

== History ==
Plans for creating a Rostov metro go back to the 1970s and 1980s. A publicised 1991 map of a system provided a single 14 kilometre line with 10 stations, running parallel to the northern bank of the Don River and reaching Rostov-on-Don Airport; far future plans provided for a three line system.

The plans were revived in November 2007 when the Rostov Metro reappeared in the development program for rapid transit approved by the Ministry of Transport. The program required Rostov authorities to redraft the old proposal, taking account of past and projected development in and around the city, so that construction could resume in 2011. No other commitments were ever made. In April 2008, the Rostov city hall announced an upcoming feasibility study that would supersede the old studies conducted in previous decades.

In January 2008, the deputy mayor of Rostov estimated construction costs at 1 billion roubles (42 million US dollars) per kilometer; the total project cost, including land and supporting infrastructure, would cost three times more.

In September 2008, the mayor of Rostov formed a city commission for metro construction. The deputy mayor announced that in November 2008 – February 2009 the city would select design and engineering contractors; the preliminary design stage for the metro would last into 2011. In 2011, the city hall was expected to have sound cost estimates for initiating a federal funds appropriation. City officials expected the first stretch of the Rostov metro to be operational in thirteen to fourteen years, assuming normal financing from the federal budget. However, due to a lack of funding, it is unknown when the construction of the metro will start.

Rostov Metro Department ceased to exist on November 10, 2015.

== In fiction ==
Ruslan Melnikov's novel, Murancha, takes place in Rostov Metro after a nuclear war. The book, part of the Universe of Metro 2033, takes some liberties from the reality, as the subway system is halfway ready by 2013, when the war breaks out. The in-story explanation is that Rostov mechanical plant, Rostselmash, had to switch from agricultural to mining equipment as a result of financial crisis, and the metro was dug with its products as a sort of advertising campaign.
