= Monument to the Communications Workers of Don =

- Russian: Памятник "Связистам Дона"
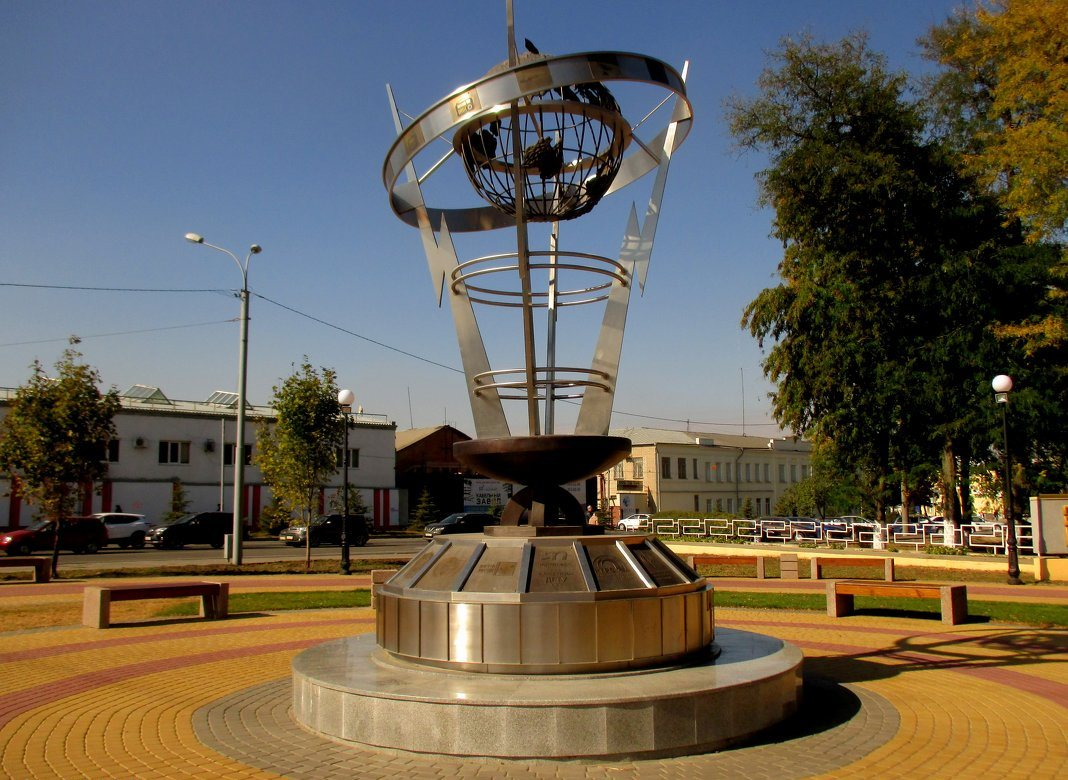
- Interactive map of Monument to the Communications Workers of Don
- Location: Rostov-on-Don, Russia
- Designer: Valentin Kostev
- Height: 6 m (20 ft)
- Opening date: 9 September 2016

Monument to the Communications Workers of Don (Russian: Памятник «Связистам Дона») is the monument which was opened on 9 September 2016 at the entrance to Ostrovsky Park in Rostov-on-Don. The author of the monument was the sculptor Valentin Kostev. The opening ceremony of the monument was coincided with the City Day, as well as the date of the 115th anniversary of the first civil radio communication session.

== History ==
In April 2016 in the city of Rostov-on-Don took place a popular vote during which it was necessary to choose the best model. In the future the monument to the Communication workers of Don will be created on the basis of it. On the first place there was a model which was created by the staff of the branch of the Federal State Unitary Enterprise "Radio Frequency Center of the Central Federal District". Valentin Kostev was chosen as a sculptor. The monument was built on the voluntary contributions of the city residents and donations received from patrons. The place for the installation of the monument was chosen as the entrance to the Nikolai Ostrovsky Recreation Park, on the crossing of the 14th line and Sholokhov avenue.

== Description ==
In the center of the sculptural composition is the globe. It is located on a pedestal with arrows. The author of the sculpture thought out the elements that are responsible for displaying Telecommunications, postal and Satellite radio system. Thus, arrows symbolize telecommunications; a dove with an envelope in its beak is for postal communication, Satellite radio system is identified with an orbit that is located around the Earth. The height of the sculpture is about 6 meters. At the base the creators placed the tablets on which the names of the patrons of the project and the names of the communication operators are indicated. Near the sculpture there is Wi-Fi and a camera, which has a connection to the "Safe City" system.
