= Yury Ryazanov =

Yury Ryazanov is the name of:

- Yuri Ryazanov (Russian: Ю́рий Серге́евич Ряза́нов; 1987–2009), Russian artistic gymnast
- Yurij Ryazanov (or Yuri Ryazanov; Russian: Ю́рий Ви́кторович Ряза́нов; born 1970), Russian businessman and politician
