= Daniel Pakosh =

Dan Pakosh

Daniel (Dan) Pakosh (July 8, 1932 - July 27, 2023) is credited with designing and marketing the first bi-directional tractor in the world among other inventions and innovations.

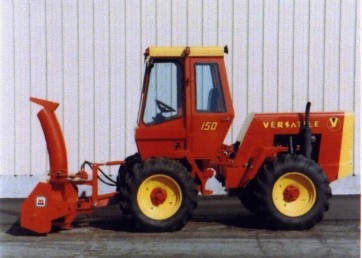
World's first Bi-directional tractor designed by Dan Pakosh for Versatile Manufacturing Ltd. of Winnipeg, Canada.

The original Versatile tractor could be used to either push or pull an implement with equal power, it was marketed as being "a number of self-propelled machines in one". The Versatile "Bi-Di" model 150 was released in 1977.

The concept was an immediate success. With 4WD and a switchable operator's platform, bi-directional tractors had arrived.

Twenty years later, when Versatile was sold to Ford-New Holland, the design engineers at New Holland brought Dan Pakosh out of retirement to help them modernize the bidirectional tractor, taking it forward into the next century. The result was the New Holland TV-140.

New Holland's current bi-directional tractor model is the TV6070.

Dan Pakosh was the creator of today's modern day bi-directional tractor.
