= Yuri Ryazanov (politician) =

- Юрий Рязанов
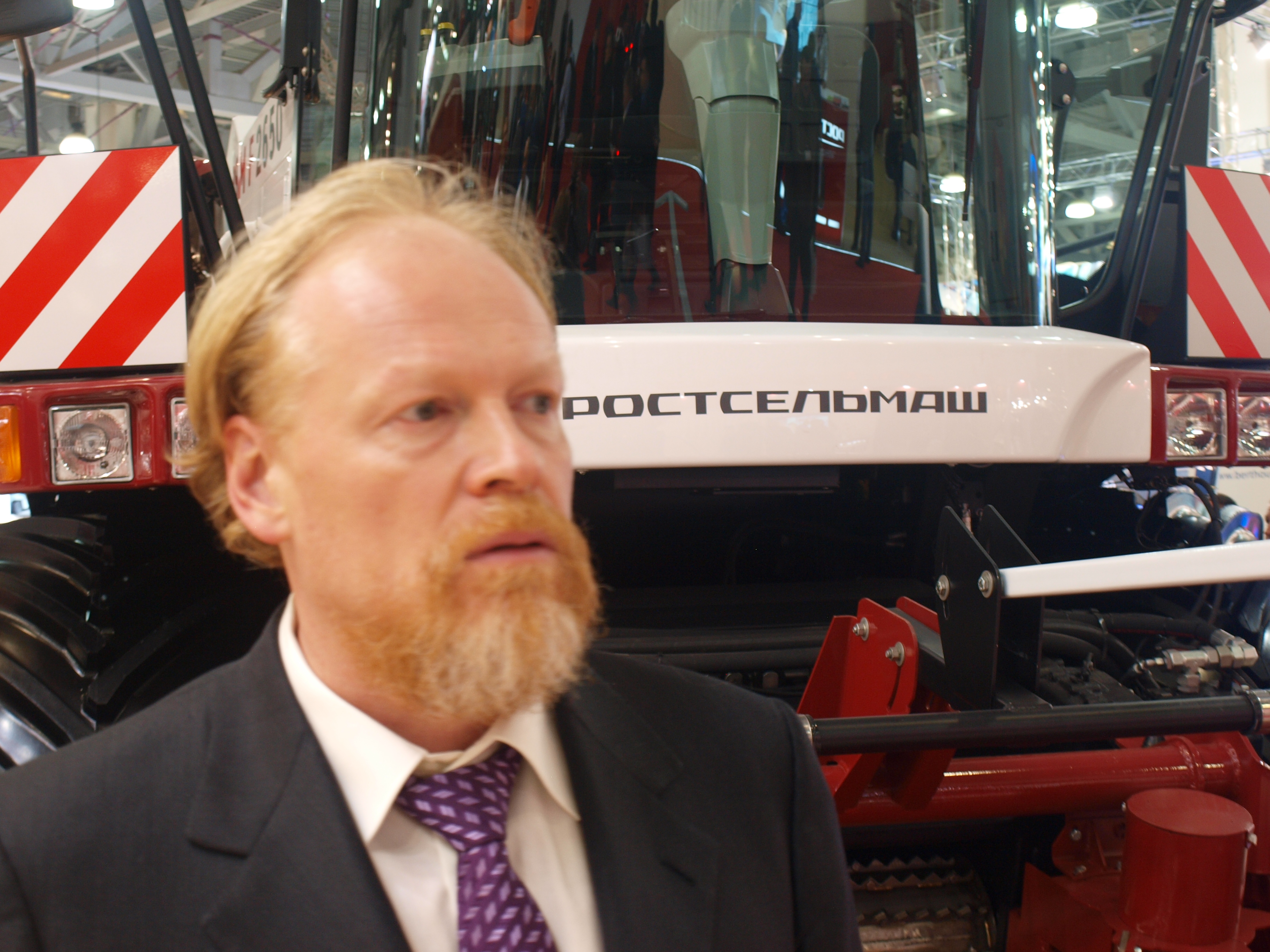
- Born: September 24, 1970 (age 55); Miass, Chelyabinsk Oblast, USSR
- Citizenship: Russia
- Education: Moscow Institute of Physics and Technology
- Occupations: Businessman, politician, publisher, poet, producer, screenwriter
- Political party: Party of Action
- Children: 4

Yuri Viktorovich Ryazanov (Russian: Ю́рий Ви́кторович Ряза́нов; born September 24, 1970) is a Russian businessman and politician. He is a member of the Federal Council of the all-Russian political party Party of Action and the Vice President of Novoe Sodruzhestvo. He is a member of the board of directors of Rostselmash, Empils and Buhler Industries.

== Early life ==
Ryazanov was born in 1970 in Miass (Chelyabinsk region; USSR) in a family of engineers of the State Rocket Center. In 1993, he graduated from the department of Aerophysics and Space Research of Moscow Institute of Physics and Technology.

== Career ==
In 1992 he was a co-founder of CJSC Production Association Commonwealth. In conjunction with Konstantin Babkin and Dmitry Udras withdrew Empils (1998) and Rostselmash (2000) plants from the crisis of the 1990s.

Since the brink of failure in the 1990s, these days Rostselmash has been enjoying a revival. ... Rostselmash now sells to more than 35 countries and opened its first office in (Germany) last year. When Vladimir Putin gathered his advisers for a meeting on the development of regional industry earlier this year, they met at Rostselmash.

— The Economist, 11 August 2018.

Since 2005 he has been Vice President of CJSC Novoe Sodruzhestvo (Russian: Промышленный Союз "Новое Содружество"), uniting 20 enterprises located in Rostov Oblast, Moscow, Kazakhstan, Ukraine, Canada and the United States.

He is the publisher of the magazine Up. He chairs the organizing Committee of the international film festival of family cinema Up.

He was the producer of for multiple films, including Rowan waltz (2009), Priest-San (2015), Private pioneer. Yay, holidays! (2015), Tale of Peter and Fevronia (2017), Private pioneer 3. Hello, adult life! (2017), Jester's Night: Seriously Off Nut, Ginger's Tale (2020), and of the short films I believe in you (2016),No nails (2016), Must not (2017), and line producer of The Flight of the horned Vikings (2018). He acted in Gerasim (2017): under the name "Georgi Vityazev".

He has authored children's books.

=== Political career ===
He is one of the founders of the all-Russian political party Party of Action. In 2010 he became a member of the Federal Council of the party.

He is known for sharp criticism of Russia's accession to the World Trade Organization over the terms of Russia's membership.

== Filmography ==
Producer:

- 2018 – Escape of the Horned Vikings (Russian: Бегство рогатых викингов)
- 2017 – The Tale of Peter and Fevronia (Russian: Сказ о Петре и Февронии)
- 2017 – Private pioneer 3. Hello, adult life! (Russian: Частное пионерское 3. Привет, взрослая жизнь!)
- 2017 – Must not (Russian: Нельзя; short film)
- 2016 – I believe in you (Russian: Я верю в тебя; short film)
- 2016 – No nails (Russian: Никаких гвоздей; short film)
- 2015 – Iyerey-san. Confessions of a Samurai (Russian: Иерей-сан. Исповедь самурая)
- 2015 – Private pioneer. Hooray, holidays!!! (Russian: Частное пионерское. Ура, каникулы!!!)
- 2009 – Rowan Waltz (Russian: Рябиновый вальс)

Actor:

- 2020 – Evening of Buffoons (Russian: Вечер шутов)
- 2019 – Daughter of Darkness(Russian: Дочь тьмы)
- 2017 – Gerasim (Russian: Герасим)

== Personal life ==
Yury Ryazanov is married and has three sons and one daughter.
