= Nikolai Ostrovsky Recreation Park =

Park in Rostov-on-Don, Russia

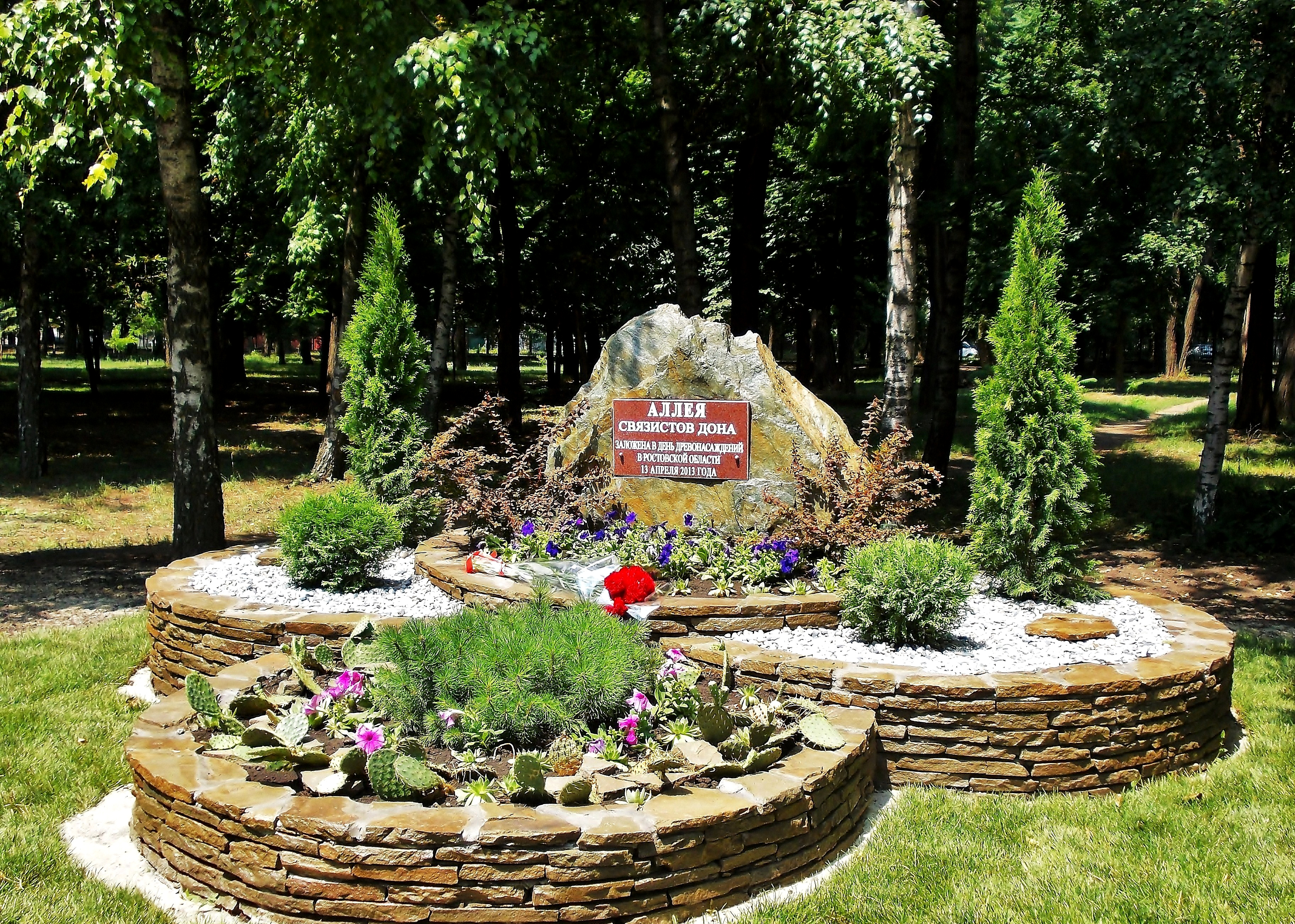
- Interactive map of Nikolai Ostrovsky Recreation Park
- Location: Rostov-on-Don, Russia
- Coordinates: 47.1441°N 39.4534°E
- Area: 63.1 hectares
- Created: 1894

Nikolai Ostrovsky Recreation Park (Russian: Парк культуры и отдыха имени Николая Островского) is the biggest theme park in Rostov-on-Don. It was established in 1894 and is named after Nikolai Ostrovsky, a Soviet writer.

== History and description ==
In 1894, on the site of the today's park, were planted the so-called Balabanov groves with an area of 100 acres. The park for many years have changed its name: Proletarsky Park, Boris Sheboldayev Park, Maria Ulyanova Park and Rostselmash Recreation Park. In 1929, the first amusement rides were installed in the Balabanov groves. Around the same period, a movie theater was built in the area. In the 1970s the park received its present name — Nikolai Ostrovsky Recreation Park. The main feature of this park is its green plantations, with rare species of trees and shrubs being presented there. Some trees are more than one hundred years old now.

Recreation Park's area is 63.1 hectares. There are a swimming pool, football fields, tennis courts, Olimp-2 Stadium and more than 40 attractions, among them is the rope park "Jungle".

In 2016 there was installed the Monument to Don Signalmen in order to commemorate the 115th anniversary of the first session of civil radio communication in Russia. In November 2017 at the park was opened the architectural composition "Sun Tree": it works on solar energy, so in the evening and at night the tree gives up the accumulated energy, lighting everything around.

== Literature ==
- Ivanisova, N.V.; Kurinskaya, L.V. (2020). Парковые ландшафты степной зоны [Park Landscapes of the steppe zone] (in Russian). Moscow, Berlin: DirectMedia. ISBN 978-5-4499-1329-6.
