= Ginger's Tale =

- Theatrical release poster
- Directed by: Konstantin Shchekin
- Written by: Ekaterina Mikhailova; Konstantin Shchekin; Tatyana Ilina; Vadim Tartakovskiy
- Screenplay by: Konstantin Shchekin
- Based on: The Tinderbox by Hans Christian Andersen
- Produced by: Yuri Ryazanov; Konstantin Shchekin; Pavel Razumov
- Starring: Natalya Tereshkova; Peter Kovrizhnyh; Sergey Burunov; Irina Yakovleva; Alexander Oleshko; Edgar Zapashny; Alexey Elistratov; Yuri Askarov; Nikita Prozorovsky; Vasily Mishchenko; Lyudmila Gnilova; Oleg Yesenin; Stanislav Strelkov
- Edited by: Sergei Minakin
- Music by: Arthur Baido
- Animation by: Vasily Krasnikov; Ekaterina Mikhailova; Polina Minaeva; Dmitry Novoselov
- Production company: Vverh Animation Studio
- Distributed by: MVK (Cartoon in the cinema)
- Release dates: 15 June 2020 (Annecy); 4 February 2021 (Russia)
- Running time: 92 minutes
- Country: Russia
- Language: Russian
- Box office: ₽21.6 million; $310,076

Ginger's Tale (Russian: Огонёк-Огниво, romanized: Ogonyok-Ognivo) is a 2020 Russian animated musical fantasy film written and directed by Konstantin Shchekin. Tatyana Ilina and Ekaterina Mikhailova also were script writers. Vverh Animation Studio produced the film which became its second and final animated film produced at the animation studio after its closure in 2021.

Within the frameworks of an original story, Ginger's Tale is a modern-day adaptation of the 1835 Danish fairy tale The Tinderbox. The animators drew exclusively in frame-by-frame traditional animation.

The film depicts the trials and tribulations of Ginger, a faithful young friend of a craftsman named Potter. One day, the poor potter craftsman finds the magical Stone Of Fire artifact that can grant the ability to turn stones to treasure. It is up to Ginger to rescue Potter, as he forgets his past and allies closer to the Queen who is also seeking the artifact. The film was noted for a drawing style of all colors and shades. It is also a story of the confrontation of human qualities such as greed and friendship.

The movie premiered and was a nominee for best animation in 2020 at the June 2020 Annecy International Animation Film Festival. The movie also premiered one month later at the Shanghai International Film Festival. The film has been granted accolades for best animation at Crystal Keys, Scandinavian International Film Festival and nominated at the San Diego International Kids Film Festival. The movie released in Russia on 4 February 2021 with critical acclaim for its animation and story.

== Plot ==
As a young craftsman, Potter works as a potter and is a resident of the fairy-tale City of Masters. Potter has just set up a shop with his friends Padlock and his betrothed Ginger. Day by day he works honestly, but is trying to make ends meet. However, he has self-doubt when he always wanted to achieve his primary goal of fixing the city's fountain.

One day, Potter stumbles upon the magic tinderbox Flint. Potter realizes he just needs to make a wish, drawing a spark, and the wish will certainly come true. With three strikes a gold dog is conjured that will bid any wish to the wielder of the artifact. The Queen learns of the activation of the artifact and cracks down on Potter so that she can seize the Stone of Fire. Without thinking twice, the Potter uses magic and makes himself untold riches. The wealth blackens the soul of a craftsman. In a critical moment, a lively and sincere girl named Ginger comes to the aid of her friend.

== Cast ==
Character	Russian Actor
Ginger	Natalya Tereshkova
Ginger spent her whole life under the care of her grandfather. She tried from an early age to save everyone who needed help. Her biggest test comes when her own friend, Potter is in trouble.
Potter	Peter Kovrizhnyh
Good and industrious Potter who first wanted to renovate the city's fountain changes when he finds a flint - a magic item that makes the owner fabulously rich, but instead casts a terrible spell.
Queen	Irina Yakovleva
The queen of a forgotten castle who can turn into two forms: the one is beautiful, tall, and hard-hearted and the other is an old, pompous woman trying to retrieve the Stone of Fire for the restoration of her fountain of youth.
Ups!	Sergey Burunov
A loyal servant of the Queen, whose steampunk inventions are never bought to the spotlight and instead languish at the castle dungeons.
Firefighter	Edgard Zapashny
Padlock	Alexander Oleshko
Awl	Alexey Elistratov
Shoe	Yuri Askarov
Archivist	Nikita Prozorovsky
Doctor	Vasily Mishchenko
Mistress	Lyudmila Gnilova
Сat and Zheka	Oleg Yesenin

== Production ==
=== Development ===
Vverh Animation Studio teamed up to present their next feature film after their release of the 2017 animated film The Tale of Peter and Fevronia. The scriptwriters intended the film to be a new fairy tale that features the centerpiece character, Ginger.

The idea of the story started when the team at a meeting decided to make a story about love. However, there was a bag of money nearby. Therefore they decided the story to revolve around the concept of love and money. As they wrote the script, a copy of an 1835 Fairy Tales Told for Children. First Collection was nearby and it reminded them of how their script had parallels to the stories of Danish storyteller Hans Christian Andersen. The scriptwriters were known to be Andersen fairy tale readers and they believed Andersen's fairy tale The Tinderbox would be an apt reference point for the script. The writers were able to reference pertinent details of The Tinderbox such as the magical artifact protected by guard dogs.

Andersen's central concept of how with just one strike at the tinderbox a copper dog will be summoned with copper coins; twice a silver dog with silver coins; and third a gold dog with gold coins is completely portrayed in the film Ginger's Tale. The artifact - Stone Of Fire was the motif object that drove forward the conflict of the film. The writers deviated from the source material slightly in its depiction of the wish fulfillment object. In the fairy tale, the tinderbox had the power to fulfill any desire of its owner while in the film, the artifact was used to grant the fulfillment of money. The minor change tied back to their original story pitch of money and its effects of greed. The writers wanted to convey the central idea that "money in itself is not bad; but they need to be earned by honest labor." The final script was created within the frameworks of an original story. However the fairy tale was reinterpreted to modern realities.

The setting chosen for the film is originally set between the West and the Urals giving the film a Balkan tone somewhere in Eastern Europe. The choreography itself drew upon Romanian, Bulgarian and Irish folk dances that was used as a reference point by the animators.

=== Characters ===
The main character Potter was originally a soldier that was later changed to a craftsman potter. The change was symbolic in nature that would describe the overall dynamics between the two main characters Potter and Ginger whom are both melded together like clay as the film progresses. Originally based as a feature film, the team finalized the format as animation. Ginger on the other hand was depicted as a character with exuberant energy that parallels not only her characteristics of her red hair but also her name for the Russian release, (Russian: Огонёк) means "fire."

Overall, the script was built on presenting a new fairy tale to the modern generation emphasizing the ageless morality that is present in such stories. The creators intended the film to be an appealing film filled with bright memorable characters. They also focused on making the characters inspirational to the audience. The creators prepared the film so that any audience can understand the story including both the children and the adults. According to the director, “It was important for us to make a cartoon that would be understandable to a viewer in any country, so the visual and musical languages of Ginger's Tale are universal.” The climax of the script required the most focus. The creators took special care in resolving the character Potter's peripeteia caused by the effects of the Stone of Fire.

=== Themes ===
The original story explored the main motif of selfless love through the main character Ginger. The film juxtaposed the themes of the triumph of actions done by the deeds of the heart and its sacrifices in relation to greed. The script also brings to attention the theme of how honesty, love, and work is more expensive than any money. The symbolism of the artifact being a flint that has ambient heat fire effects was used by the script writers as an allegory to potters hardening and giving shape to their clay by firing the substance in a kiln. Similarly the morality of the characters, especially the character Potter is associated with clay that is soft like a soul. The firing of the clay by the effects of the flint hardens the soul of the potter.

The character Ups and Potter are foils to each other. The former is depicted as a genius inventor at the castle, who rather be a servant to the Queen rather than earn praise for his ingenious devices, while Potter is depicted as a self-doubter for his work on pottery.

Overall the film preparations took over three years with initial work done on characters, locations, and storyboards. The direction was greatly inspired by the Soviet Union director Georgiy Daneliya. Previously, Konstantin Shchekin worked with the director as an animation director and supervisor. Veteran screenwriter and production designer Tatyana Ilyina was also part of the production team.

The roles of the youngest characters, Ginger and Potter were performed by the actors, Natalya Tereshkova and Peter Kovrizhnyh of the TV series The Junior Team. The casting of the character Firefighter fit the voice actor Edgard Zapashny perfectly to the point where the lines for the characters were rewritten. The role was Zapashny's first time dubbing for an animated film. Actress Irina Yakovleva was cast for her timbre voice and similarity in appearance to the character Queen. At the May 2019 Multimir animation and entertainment festival, a teaser for the film was presented by Sergey Burunov, Edgar Zapashny, Alexander Oleshko, and other actors who voiced the cartoon.

=== Animation ===
Vverh Animation Studio decided to choose their favorite technology - traditional animation for the film. The animators harnessed their specialization in 2D animation through the depiction of the characters. The leading 2D animators from Russia were bought in to draw the canvas of the film while the backgrounds were drawn in 3D. Ginger's Tale differs from other animation films by its use of the "conveyor" system. This technique assigns small details of the animation frames to members of different art groups. A characteristic feature of this design is the multi-layered background design that required special care. The animation team with this technique bought out the different hues and shades of the story. The drawings also embedded steampunk elements that revolved around the inventions of the eccentric inventor character Ups. The two departments of background design and personal character drawings interacted with each other to bring to life the array of characters in the film.

Highlights of the film are song dances of the characters animated under the direction of theater choreographer Irina Kashuba. The creators intended to emphasize the originality and uniqueness of the characters in the film. Therefore, they presented the characters dancing to the soundtrack. The animation at this stage was drawn by transferring the movements of real dancers to the movements of drawn characters. The animators also revived the methods of classical Soviet animation.

Production designer Vasily Krasnikov says, "The range of animator tasks is quite large. This is an expressive drawing and a sense of movement, an understanding of the composition of the frame and the laws of editing, acting and directing skills. Like any artist, an animator needs to develop observation skills, notice interesting scenes in life, draw characteristic poses and emotions." Producer Yuri Ryazanov noted for Animationweek in August 2020 that 2D animation films have recently become competitively disadvantageous against 3D animation films. The producer believes there must be active investment for traditional animation in order for the technique to survive in the future.

=== Soundtrack ===
The soundtrack presents four songs and a score by composer Arthur Baido. The recurring themes of fairy tale elements are added into the songs to create the mood of a fairy tale musical film. The film has been compared to Disney animated musicals. The creators of the film wanted the viewers to empathize with the characters. Therefore, they inserted melodic sequences that is described as "illustrative music." Actress and singer Liza Vinagrodova and Rodion Gazmanov presented the theme song "Song of Fire" at the New Year.

Ginger's Tale

Soundtrack album by Arthur Baido
- Released: 4 February 2021
- Recorded: 2018
- Genre: Feature film soundtrack
- Language: Russia

Track listing
No.	Title	Singer(s)	Length
1.	"Pesnya Ogonyok - Song of Fire"	Rodion Gazmanov, Liza Vinogradova	2:33
2.	"Pesnya Korolevy - The Queen's Song"	Natalia Sidortsova	1:22
3.	"Pesnya Upsa - Up's Song"	Sergey Burunov	1:10
4.	"Pesnya Druzey - Friends' Song"	Liza Vinogradova, Pyotr Kovrizhnykh, Alexey Elistratov, Alexander Oleshko, Andrey Birin	1:13
Total length:			6:18

== Release ==
=== Theatrical ===
At the 15 June 2020 Annecy International Animation Film Festival, the film entered into the final list of best animated films of 2020. The film one of the few Russian films to do so. Artistic delegate of the Annecy, Marcel Jean noted after seeing the film, "In recent years, there has been an increasingly varied and consistent production of Russian animation. Historically, the USSR was "one of the great foci of animated cinema. It feels like Russia is reaching its full potential."

Despite the effects of COVID-19, the film received a host of accolades in 2020. At the 25 June 2020 Shanghai International Film Festival, Ginger's Tale represented Russia as it was nominated for the Golden Goblet award. Only three other films vied for contention that included The Old Man Movie from Estonia, Boonie Bears: The Wild Life from China, and Words Bubble Up Like Soda Pop from Japan. The Mandarin festive title for the film went by The Story of Jin Jie. On 18 September 2020, the film became a selection for the California animation film society ASIFA-Hollywood. In 25 September 2020, the film received the grand prize for the "Best Feature-Length Animated Film" at the Scarlet Sails of Artek Festival. The film forum held in Artek, Russia is a notable festival that recognizes the development of cinema in Russia and the world with noted emphasis on children's educational material.

Originally scheduled for release in Russia on 8 October 2020, the distributors MVK rescheduled the release date to 4 February 2021. A pre-premiere screening was held at Formula Kino. In 2015, the Russian television channel "Mult" (English: "Cartoon") together with the All-Russia State Television and Radio Broadcasting Company (VGTRK) launched a unique project "Mult v kino" (English: "Cartoon in the cinema") in the cinema market, which has now changed its name to "MVK."

=== Farewell of animation studio ===
The financial loss sustained by the film caused Vverh Animation Studio to close just before March 2021. The film was poorly received in the box office. It made about 21.4 million rubles ($310,076) against a production budget of 250 million rubles (~$3.3 million). The light budgeted film faced high competition against the elite influence of Pixar's Soul that released in Russia in the start of 2021 that has collected $21.6 million in the box office. The film also was affected by the postponement of its initial release in October 2020 to 2021 due to collateral effects of COVID-19. One of its film reels was pirated online after a mishap happened after its exhibition at the Annecy Festival in France.

Ginger's Tale became the last project of the studio that was succeeded by its animation debut 18th century magnum opus The Tale of Peter and Fevronia (2017) directed by Yury Kulakov. The film was in production for seven years. The studio also produced one season of animated series Defenders. The studio was preparing to announce its next project as well as a planned crowdfunding for the publication of the art book based on the Ginger's Tale after its premiere which became cancelled. Vverh Animation Studio gave the farewell pronouncement to the film's audience stating they were surprised by the outreach of support for traditional animation as well as being honored to be part of a collaborative, innovative team:

"The years of activity of the studio Vverh were an excellent experience of joint work of a number of unique specialists. The studio was able to organically combine the continuity of the hand-drawn tradition and the modern approach in full-length animation. Thank you, our precious viewers, for your faith in the project and your endless words of support! We were pleasantly surprised by the growing interest in hand-drawn animation and tried to make a decent project."

=== Critical response ===
Film-rezensionen review from Germany found the film has solid animation. "But the appealing pictures and some good elements are enough for the solid midfield." The reviewer also found the movie hearkens back to the nostalgic traditional animation of Disney and Russian cartoons in general, because it employs the "well-known template" of fairy-tales. Most noticeably the reviewer compared the film to 101 Dalmatians. However, the review found the most interesting aspect of the film is the character development of Potter. The script accurately describes the transformation of Potter from a poor craft artist to a gold despot.

A French Annecy review remarked the film is a refreshing 2D animation film in the year of 2020. The review found Ginger's story to be the cornerstone of the film as the recurring theme of "material goods do not make happiness" moves the plot along about the interaction of Potter, Ginger, and their society. Another Annecy review noted the quality of animation, "The 2D animation is elegant, using in particular the atmospheres of sunsets, and evoking the universes of Snow White or Sleeping Beauty of Disney, including even in the character of the evil queen."

Italian review by Antonio Abate states one "cannot deny a certain grace" the film projects to the audience. The review stated even though the story is of "an ordinary girl", it is a portrayal of how Ginger is "keeping high the spirit of a friend who is increasingly lost in front of her eyes." Overall, the review concluded, the film "instills in the whole a graceful, even consoling sense."

A review from Intermedia stated the theme song is "a groovy clip with a song that must be included in your festive playlist." A preliminary Annecy review from Kino-Teatr found as the film progresses, the characters began to take hints of the characters in the 2013 space opera animated film Ku! Kin-dza-dza. The official Kino-Teatr review by Maria Tereshchenko remarked, the film is "chiseled, measured action that captures the viewer from the first seconds and does not let go until the finale."

Russian reviews were universally accepting of the critical acclaim of the film. Time Out review by Klara Khomenko denoted an accurate representation of life themes from the characters Ginger, Potter, and Ups: "As a result, the Potter begins to envy everyone around him and dream of power and free money — he thinks that this can compensate for the lack of talent. In fact, the Potter has a talent, you just need to realize it." Denis Stupnikov of Intermedia believed adapting Hans Christian Andersen's fairy tales has found many different adaptations and styles, but for Ginger's Tale, "the creators of the cartoon gave the fairy tale a high sacrificial meaning" to the fairy tale The Tinderbox. Furthermore, the review found hidden context throughout the film and the title itself of the Russian-version Огонёк-Огниво (Fire-Flint). Stupnikov believed the title of the film is a paradox: "If 'flint' is associated in the cartoon with the world of consumption, which puts above all the power of money and transient fame, then 'fire' means the inner flame of a compassionate soul."

A review at Kanobu remarked Potter's and Ginger's "dynamic is very reminiscent of a couple from the Ghibli studio cartoons." Kino Mail review from Boris Grishin stated, "A well-drawn story in the best traditions of Soviet animated fairy tales. A lot of interesting diverse characters, dialogues, individual events and incidents within the main line."

The animation of the film was a standout for critics. A review at Lifehacker denoted Ginger's Tale deviates from contemporary animation by its use of color style - "The color scheme of the cartoon is also pleasant. It mainly consists of warm and soft shades, which are often combined in unusual combinations. Animators play with the viewer: when portraying negative characters or events, they use cold tones. And the goodies are painted with warm colors."

Asya Zabolotskaya of Kinoafisha review also found the film to be a "kind and daring frame-by-frame animation based on the fairy tale by Hans Christian Andersen." In terms of animation the review noted, "The developing almost fiery hair of the main character, every crease on the Potter's shirt and his unruly sleeves, splashes, wind and just less bright backdrops immediately plunge the viewer into this unusual and new drawn world. Watching the everyday affairs and interactions of the characters is another adventure, independent of the main storyline."

=== Accolades ===
Award	Date of ceremony	Category	Nominee	Result
Annecy International Animation Film Festival	15 June 2020	Best Feature	Konstantin Shchekin	Nominated
Shanghai International Film Festival	25 July 2020	Animated Films	Konstantin Shchekin	Nominated
Prague Independent Film Festival	6 August 2020	Animation	Ginger's Tale	Nominated
Suzdalfest	17 March 2021	Full-Length Animated Film	Ginger's Tale	Nominated

== See also ==
- Russian animation
- List of animated feature films of 2020
- Ginger's Tale - Cartoon, Film Company VVERH
