= Konstantin Babkin =

Russian businessman and politician

- Константин Бабкин
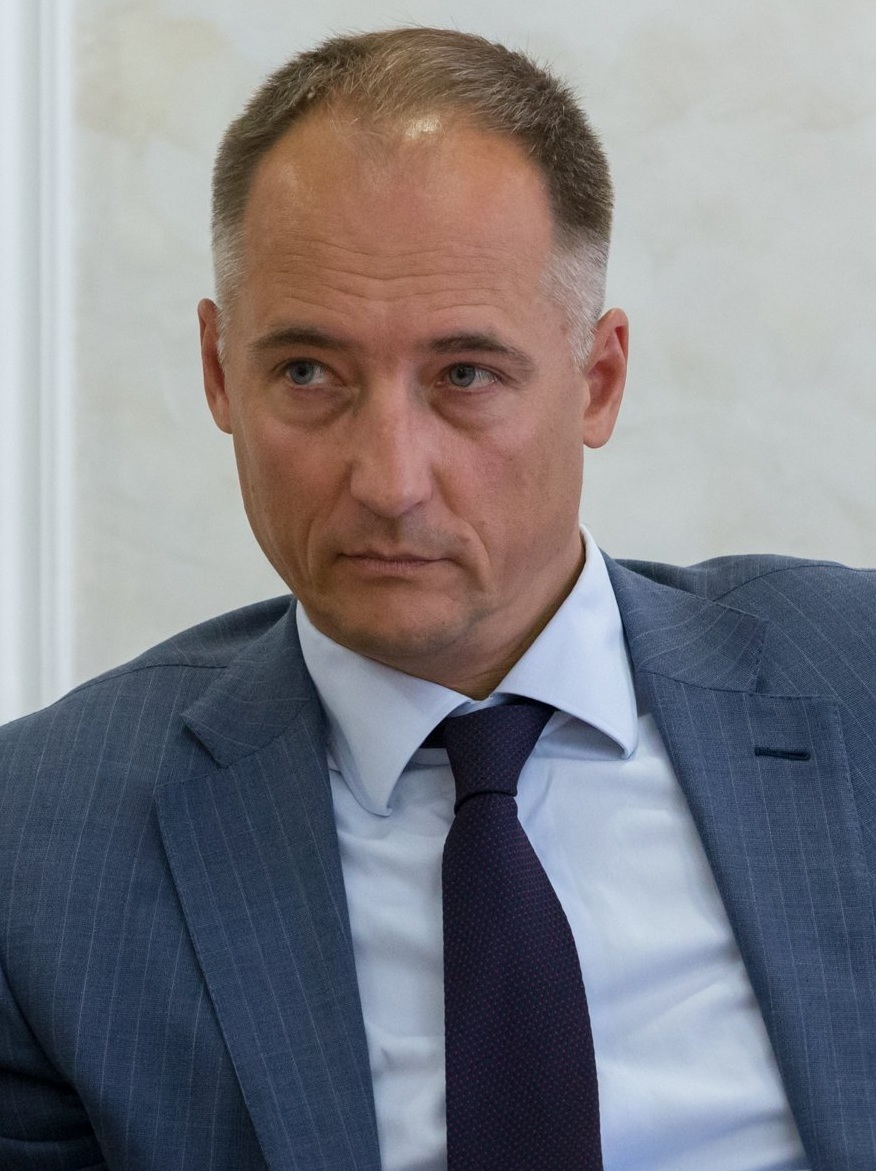
- Babkin in 2017
- Born: 13 February 1971 (age 55); Miass, Chelyabinsk Oblast, Soviet Union
- Education: Moscow Institute of Physics and Technology
- Occupations: Businessman and politician
- Political party: Party of Business

Konstantin Anatolyevich Babkin (Russian: Константи́н Анато́льевич Ба́бкин; born 13 February 1971) is a Russian businessman and politician. He is the chairman of the federal council of the political party Party of Business, which supports Vladimir Putin in Russia.

He is the president of CJSC Novoe Sodruzhestvo and the president Rosspetsmash association. Member of the board of directors of Rostselmash, Empils and formerly Buhler Industries. chairman of the board of the Chamber of Commerce and Industry of the Russian Federation on Industrial Development and Competitiveness of the Russian Economy.

== Early life and education ==
Babkin was born in 1971 in Miass (Chelyabinsk region; USSR) in the family of the State Rocket Center engineers. In 1994, graduated from the department of molecular and chemical physics of the Moscow Institute of Physics and Technology.

== Career ==
In 1992, Babkin became the co-founder of the Joint-Stock Company Industrial Association Commonwealth. Since 2005 he has been the president of the CJSC Production Association Novoe Sodruzhestvo. The company includes 20 enterprises located in the Rostov region, Moscow, Kazakhstan, Ukraine, Canada and the United States. Key assets of the holding are Rostselmash, Empils and Buhler Industries (Farm King, Versatile). The annual turnover is more than 1 billion dollars.

The main shareholders of Novoe Sodruzhestvo are its three founders and managing directors: Babkin, Dmitry Udras and Yuri Ryazanov.

In conjunction with Dmitry Udras and Yuri Ryazanov withdrew Empils (1998) and Rostselmash (2000) plants from the crisis of the 1990-s.

On the brink of failure in the 1990s, these days Rostselmash has been enjoying a revival. ... Rostselmash now sells to more than 35 countries and opened its first office in (Germany) last year. When Vladimir Putin gathered his advisers for a meeting on the development of regional industry earlier this year, they met at Rostselmash.

— The Economist, 8.11.2018.

In November 2004, Babkin was elected the president of Rosspetsmash association, renamed in 2017 in Rosspetsmash. He is the member of the Bureau of the Central Council of Russian Engineering Union.

On 8 October 2006, he was elected the deputy of Novgorod Regional Duma of the fourth convocation in the Free Russia party list, which he headed (11.03%). He is a member of deputy group Veche, and a member of the budget, finance and economy committee.

On 3 September 2010, Babkin initiated the creation of the organizing committee of all-Russian political party Party of Business. On 14 October 2010 at the constituent congress, he was elected the chairman of the Federal Political Party Council.

chairman of the board of the Chamber of Commerce and Industry of the Russian Federation on Industrial Development and Competitiveness of the Russian Economy.

One of the organizers and a co-chairman of the Moscow Economic Forum.

On 2 March 2022, Buhler Industries announced that Babkin had resigned as chairman and from the board of directors of the company.

Babkin supported the Russian invasion of Ukraine in 2022. After Russia's annexation of Crimea in 2014, Babkin said to a crowd at a rally, "We should not stop at Crimea!".

== Bibliography ==
- Babkin K. A. Entering the Common Market, Don’t Forget Your Own // Parliamentary Newspaper. 2004. No. 96 (1398). February 12.
- Babkin K. A. In the Interests of Technical Modernization of Agricultural Production // Economy of Russia's Agriculture. 2007. No. 6.
- Babkin K. A. Russia Needs a New Course // Foresight Russia: Designing a New Industrial Policy. Collection of materials from the St. Petersburg International Economic Congress (SPEC-2015) / Edited by S. D. Bodrunov. — Moscow: Cultural Revolution. pp. 45–49. — ISBN 978-5-902764-58-8
- Konstantin Babkin. Article (with editorial commentary): “Gref Had Breakfast with Liberal Friends... What Do Their Plans Promise Us?” Co-owner of Rostselmash Shares His Observations from the St. Petersburg Economic Forum // Business Online, Tatarstan’s Business E-newspaper, 25.05.2018
- Babkin K. A. The Country of Exhausted Tractors. Why Agricultural Machinery in Russia Runs to the Limit // Forbes, 31.05.2018
- Articles by K. A. Babkin on the Citizen-Creator portal

=== Monograph ===
Author of the book Sound Industrial Policy, or How can we manage to overcome the crisis? /"Razumnaya promyshlennaya politika, ili Kak nam vyyti iz krizisa"/ (Moscow: 2008. — ISBN 978-5-9901585-1-1), which has survived several editions and was translated into English (2012).

== Articles ==
- Babkin K. A. In the interests of modernization of agricultural production // Agricultural Economics of Russia. – 2007. – No. 6. – P. 26—27.
- Babkin K. A., etc. V. V. Putin has held a meeting in Rostov-on-Don with the administration of Rostselmash. The shorthand report of the beginning of the meeting. On July, 6th 2009.

== Personal life ==
Married. With five children: three sons and two daughters

== Awards ==
- 2014 was named as the Man of the Year by the Business Quarter magazine, Rostov-on-Don.
- 2014 was awarded the title of Honored Machine Builder by the Minister of Industry and Trade of the Russian Federation.
- 2020 was awarded the Medal of the Order "For Merit to the Fatherland" of 2nd degree.
