= Rostselmash =

Russian company

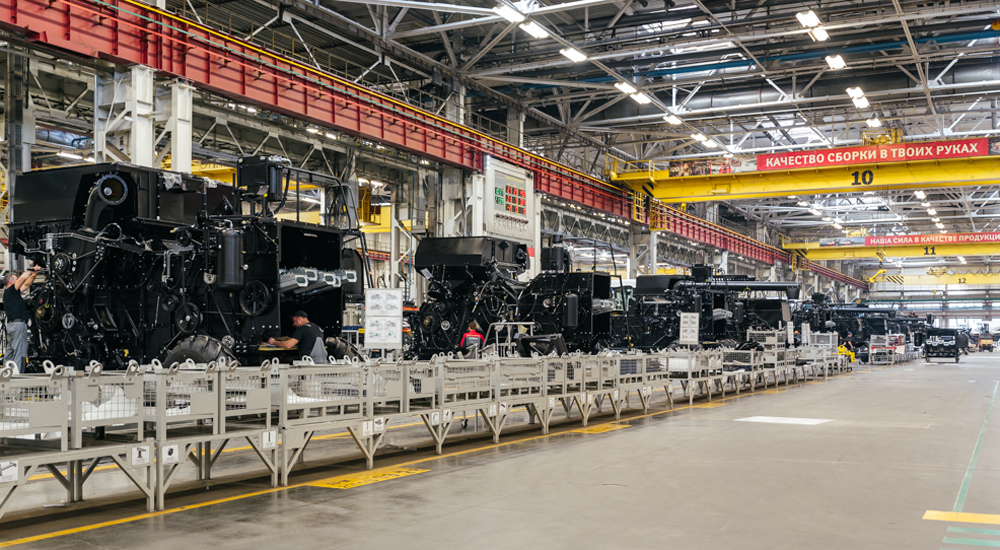
- Native name: Ростсельмаш
- Founded: 1929
- Headquarters: Rostov-on-Don, Russia
- Key people: Konstantin Babkin, Dmitry Udras, Yuri Ryazanov, Valery Maltsev (CEO)
- Revenue: $7 million (2017)
- Operating income: $24.9 million (2017)
- Net income: $222 million (2017)
- Total assets: $61 million (2017)
- Total equity: $472 million (2017)
- Number of employees: 9,462 (2016)
- Website: en.rostselmash.com

Rostselmash (Russian: Ростсельмаш) is a Russian agricultural equipment company, based in Rostov-on-Don. Founded in 1929, it primarily produces combine harvesters. The company income in 2005 was around 400 million dollars. The company name is a syllabic abbreviation of Rostovskiy zavod sel'skokhozyaystvennykh mashin (Russian: Ростовский завод сельскохозяйственных машин), the Rostov factory for agricultural machines.

The company formerly sponsored the football club FC Rostov; during that time the club was named FC Rostselmash.

== History ==
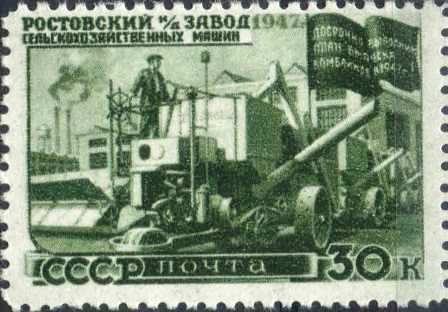
Rostov Factory for Agricultural Machines on a 1947 stamp

Rostselmash was founded in 1929 as a government contractor, producing a variety of products for state farms. In 1931, the first Stalinets harvesters were produced. The Stalinets-1 was awarded with the highest award (Grand Prix diploma) during the World Industrial Exhibition in Paris in 1937 and by 1940 fifty thousand units were assembled.

During Operation Barbarossa, Rostselmash dismantled its plant in Rostov-on-Don, and relocated in Tashkent, the capital of Uzbekistan. Production shifted from agricultural goods to military equipment until the end of the war. In 1943, production was returned to Rostov.

After the war, the Stalinets-6 harvesters were assembled and in 1955 Rostselmash began to specialize in grain harvester production. In 1958, the SK-3 self-propelled harvesters were introduced followed by the SK-4 in 1962. By 1969, Rostselmash produced a million harvesters. The SK Niva harvesters, introduced in 1973, remain in production for the Eastern European market.

By 1984 Rostselmash produced two million harvesters. The Don Series combines were introduced in 1986; those along with tractors were sold in North America by Belarus Tractor of Canada. Both had a reputation for poor quality, lack of operator comfort, poor reliability, and lack of part availability.

After the fall of the Soviet Union, Rostselmash was incorporated into a joint-stock company in 1992, and fully privatized in 2000. The new owners — Konstantin Babkin, Dmitry Udras and Yuri Ryazanov withdrew Rostselmash from the crisis of 1990-s.

On the brink of failure in the 1990s, these days Rostselmash has been enjoying a revival. ... Rostselmash now sells to more than 35 countries and opened its first office in Germany last year. When Vladimir Putin gathered his advisers for a meeting on the development of regional industry earlier this year, they met at Rostselmash.

— The Economist, November 8, 2018.

In 2007 they took control of Buhler Industries of Winnipeg in Canada. Buhler Industries are the owners of the Canadian–built Versatile brand of articulated tractor, founded by Peter Pakosh.

In early 2024, it was announced that RostSelMash had sold all shares of Versatile Tractors (Buhler Industries) to Turkish-based Basak Traktor, which is a subsidiary of ASKO Holdings.

In June 2025, Rostselmash suspended production, citing collapsing demand as farmers struggled with capital deficiencies related to the poor economic climate in Russia. Executives and analysts cited high interest rates cutting off access to affordable financing and high export duties assessed against farmers as the principal causes of the collapse in demand.

== Products ==
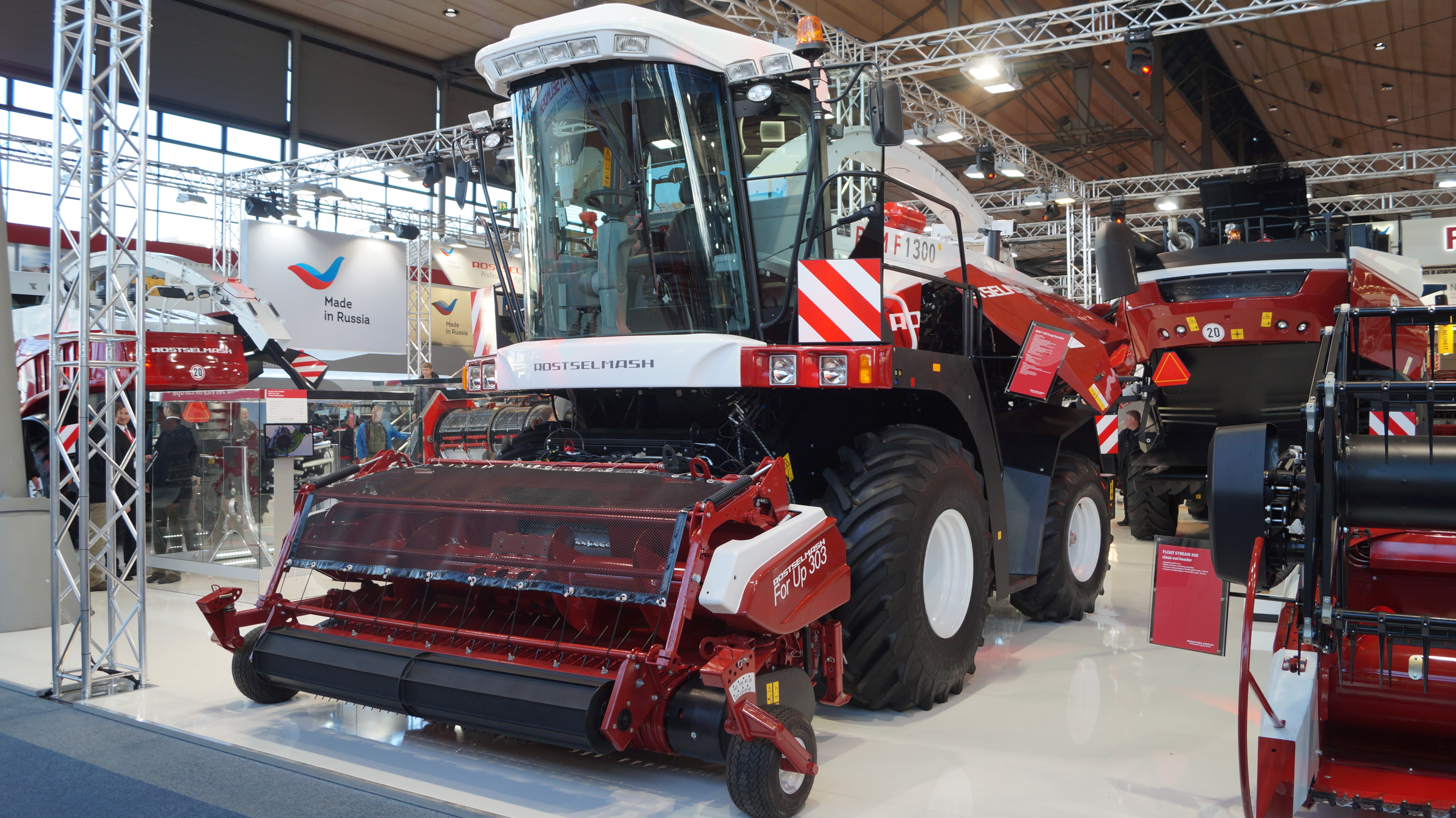
Rostselmash RSM F 1300 at Agritechnica 2017

=== Harvesters ===
Rostselmash produces four harvester variants. A 400 hp rotary harvester is sold the Rostselmash name in Eastern Europe and the Versatile name in North America. The RT 490 uses a unique Rotating Concave Rotary design where the concave rotates counter to the rotor, reducing dead spots and increasing usable area.

Vector and Acros harvesters are sold in North America through Python Manufacturing Inc.

The Niva is a 155 hp harvester developed in the Soviet era, and is available only in Eastern Europe and Africa.

=== Road-building machinery ===
In September 2021, Rostselmash announced it would develop and manufacture road building machinery, with sales planned to begin in 2023. 70% of new production is intended to be localized by 2024. Construction of the new plant for road-building machinery also began in the same month.

== Literature ==
- Belozertsev, Alexandr Grigoryevich (2005). Земля и хлеб России (1900-2005 гг.): историко-экономический очерк [The land and bread of Russia (1900-2005): A historical-economic essay] (in Russian). Moscow: МСХА. ISBN 5-9675-0003-0.
- Дон Советский. Историко-экономический и социально-политический очерк [Soviet Don. A historical-economic and socio-political essay] (in Russian). Rostov-on-Don. 1986.
- Tsymbalov, Nikolai Iurievich (2011). "Организация эвакуации производительных сил СССР в начале Великой Отечественной войны (на примере Ростовской области)" [The evacuation of the USSR's productive forces at the beginning of the Great Patriotic War (the case of the Rostov region)]. Известия высших учебных заведений. Северо-Кавказский регион. Общественные науки (in Russian) (5).
- Perekhov, Ya. A.; Venkov, A. V.; Trut, V. P.; Starikov, N. V.; Ryzhkova, N. V. (2004). Ростсельмаш: История (т.1) [Rostselmash: History (vol.1)] (in Russian). Rostov-on-Don.
