= Peter Pakosh =

Canadian businessman (1911–1999)

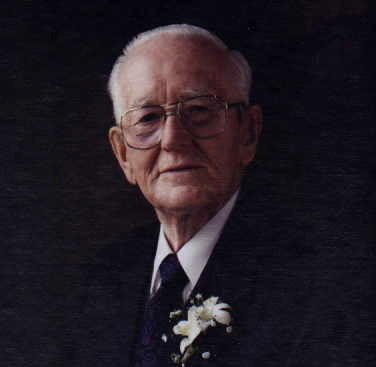
Peter Pakosh in 1991

Peter Pakosh (June 11, 1911 – February 20, 1999) was co-founder of the Versatile tractor company, and is credited with many inventions and equipment innovations including the modern-day grain auger used by combine harvesters. He is considered an innovator in the field of agricultural machinery on a level with John Deere and Cyrus McCormick.

== Early life ==
Pakosh was born in Canora, Saskatchewan on June 11, 1911. He was the second of twelve children of Polish immigrants Emil and Claudia Pakosz. From an early age, he enjoyed working on farm machinery. At 15, his father bought a steam-threshing rig and assigned Peter to its upkeep and operation. In 1935, Peter's father paid a cattle buyer $5 to take his son to Winnipeg, where he studied mechanical engineering.

== Versatile ==
Versatile was the first company to mass-produce articulated four-wheel drive tractors, starting in 1966 with the D100 and G100 four-wheel drives. Those ground-breaking tractors were primitive by modern standards, with a 6-cylinder diesel or 8-cylinder gas engine producing 100 horsepower. 1966 models sold for less than CA$10,000.

Four-wheel drive demand increased significantly, with Versatile becoming one of the leaders in four-wheel drive development and production. By the late 1970s the Versatile lineup included tractors ranging from 220 to 330 horsepower. With the 1980s came an expanded line of four-wheel drive tractors that stretched to 470 horsepower in the Versatile 1150.

In 1993, the Association of Equipment Manufacturers (formerly EMI), a trade association for manufacturers of agricultural and construction equipment, selected Pakosh as one of "100 Significant Contributors and Contributions to the Mechanization of Agriculture and Construction".

In 2009, the Canadian Manufacturers and Exporters (CME) announced that Pakosh would be inducted into the Manitoba Manufacturers' Hall of Fame as a pioneer.
