= Party of Business =

Party of Business Партия дела
- Leader: Konstantin Babkin
- Founder: Konstantin Babkin
- Founded: 14 October 2010
- Dissolved: 27 November 2024
- Merged into: Liberal Democratic Party of Russia
- Membership: 52,000
- Ideology: Protectionism; Economic nationalism
- National affiliation: National Patriotic Forces of Russia

Website
- partyadela.ru

The Party of Business (Russian: Партия дела, romanized: Partiya dela, aka 'Party of the Cause' or 'Party of Action') was a political party in Russia whose main goal was to promote "economic expediency". The party was founded on 14 October 2010, and officially registered on 14 December 2012. The party has described itself as "neither a right-wing nor a left-wing party" and "open to all ideas that would help us improve the social and economic situation in our country." It opposed and spoke out against the decline of Russian agriculture, and called for its revival and expansion. It also supported a reduction of the price of Russian gas and oil, and an income tax that increases based upon the average salary of Russian citizens.

== History ==
On September 22, 2010, a group of economists and businessmen declared that a new party under the name "Party Action" would soon be organized.

On October 14, 2010, in the Izmailovo Hotel in Moscow, the founding congress of the party took place, where 160 delegates from 51 regions of Russia approved the program and the charter of the party.

The first regional branch of the party was formed on November 10, 2010, in Bashkortostan. By December 1, 2010, regional branches had been formed in 42 constituents of Russia, which gave the party the status of an "All-Russian political party."

On December 27, 2010, the party submitted documents for registration to the Ministry of Justice of the Russian Federation. In February 2011, the party was denied registration. The decision of the Ministry of Justice of the Russian Federation was appealed in court.

On October 31, 2012, delegates from the regional branches of Russia held a Constituent Congress, where it was decided that the "Party of Business," an All-Russian political party, would be created, and its Charter and Program were approved as well.

On March 5, 2015, the party members held the II Congress in Kostroma intending to accept new members to the Federal Council and a new version of the Program.

The party’s activities were suspended by Russia’s Supreme Court in April 2024 after violations were found in the party’s charter. On 18 October 2024, Russia’s Ministry of Justice requested to dissolve the party. On 27 November 2024, the Party of Business was liquidated by the Supreme Court of the Russian Federation. After the dissolution of the party, Konstantin Babkin was accepted into the Supreme Council of the Liberal Democratic Party of Russia.

== Actions ==
A protest against the reduction of agricultural subsidies was held on October 12, 2010, in front of the building of the Ministry of Agriculture of Russia. Two hundred people participated.

On November 3, 2010, a picket against Russia joining the World Trade Organization (WTO) was held. Activists from the party promised to hold protests every Wednesday until the (now former) Minister of Agriculture Yelena Skrynnik decided not to lower agricultural subsidies to the level of WTO.

== Program ==
The party intends to achieve its program goals with democratic methods, including participation in presidential and parliamentary elections, and elections to local authorities.

=== Internal policy ===
1. Reform of the judicial system.

2. Establishment of adequate penalties for violations of one's rights to private property.

3. Development of civil society.

4. Establishment of a minimum threshold for voter turnout, and the return of election of heads for subjects of the Russian Federation.

=== Social policy ===
1. Raising living standards in the country, and raising labor productivity and quality of goods and services.

2. Reducing crime.

3. Promoting family values, including increasing fertility in Russia.

4. Improving the efficiency of medical and social security and pensions.

5. Reforming sports structures, training, and state certification of trainers. It would be the personal responsibility of heads of sporting bodies for these results.

=== Culture policy ===
1. Assisting in "formation of high aesthetic taste," an establishment of "reference points in society for creative self-realization of a person for the benefit of society," and an "upbringing of young people in the spirit of morals and love for the country," all through public control in questions of morals in mass-media and educational establishments.

2. Supporting culture and art at the expense of tax privileges and the state order.

3. Introducing personal responsibility from local authorities for conservation and the maintenance of objects of cultural heritage.

=== Education policy ===
1. Improving the quality of secondary education.

2. Developing a system of additional education.

3. Increasing access to higher education.

4. Preventing the outflow of qualified personnel abroad.

5. Diversifying the policies and increases chances for availing education

=== Economic policy ===
1. Tax reform: tax increases, connected with the export of natural resources; reduction of taxes on the manufacturing industry and the elimination of the tax on high-tech manufacturing; import-substituting production and export production; tax incentives and subsidies for the renewal of the main funds of enterprises; and the introduction of a luxury tax.

2. Reducing energy tariffs for domestic consumers.

3. Developing road infrastructure.

4. Establishing state support for exports of Russian high-tech products.

5. Encouraging the development of “patriotism of a local consumer" and "patriotism of a local manufacturer.”

6. Returning to the Russian economy of state investment funds in foreign securities.

7. Transitioning mining operations to other countries and disputed territories, reducing their presence in Russia.

8. Conducting foreign policy that takes into account the interests of Russian producers-exporters.

9. Establishing economic protectionism policy.

10. Simplifying the import of goods from neighboring countries into Russia, and exports of goods from Russia.

=== State apparatus ===
1. To make a public servant accountable to the public, including a system to handle complaints against their activities.

2. To make the civil servant personally responsible for the results of the activities in the sphere subordinated to him.

3. Stop the inefficient use of public funds.

4. Increase the salaries of civil servants and reduce their numbers.

5. Penalize deviations.

=== Military policy ===
1. Introduction of a compact, contract, and efficient army.

2. Equip the army with advanced armaments.

=== Environmental policy ===
1. Intensify ecological control by the state and society.

2. Creation of comfortable living conditions in urban and rural areas; landscaping yard territories; equipment for recreation places for young people, pensioners, and children.

3. Promoting forestry, hunting, and fishing economy.

== Management ==
The management of the party is executed by the Federal Political Council, consisting of:

- Konstantin Babkin — Chairman
- Vladimir Evsjukov
- Yuri Ryazanov
- Dmitri Udras

== Symbols ==
The symbol of the Party is the bee which, according to the party leaders, is a symbol of industriousness. However, bees are currently associated with the former mayor of Moscow Yury Luzhkov.
