= Basak Traktor =

Turkish tractor manufacturing company

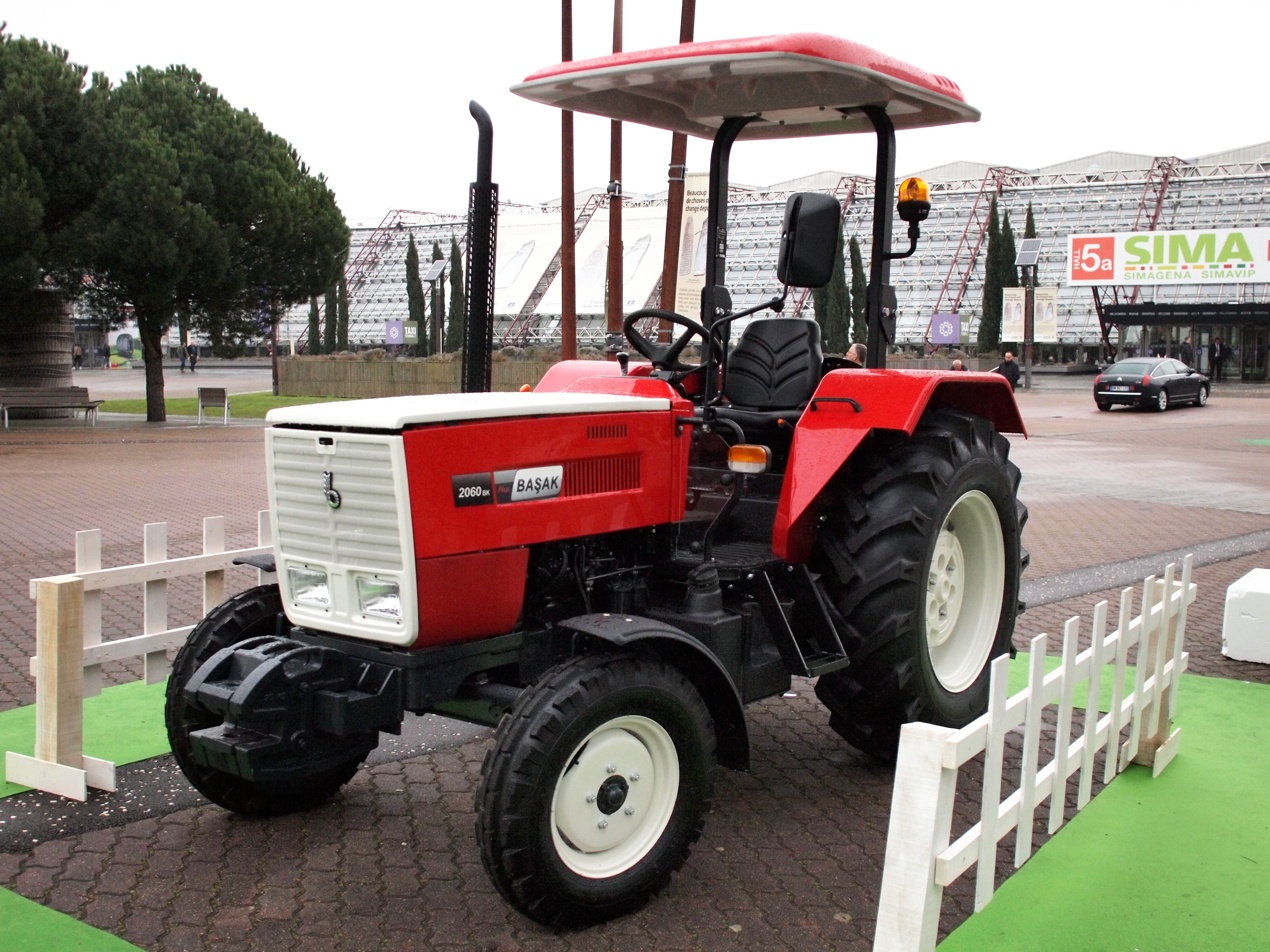
Başak 2060 BK at SIMA 2015 in Paris

Basak Agricultural Tractors, Earth Moving and Agricultural Machinery AG or Başak Traktör is a Turkish tractor manufacturer owned by the Sanko group. The company manufactures a range of field and orchard tractors. Their current lineup includes nearly 20 models of 2x4 and 4x4 tractors, with the factory's production capacity reaching approximately 10,000 units per year.

== History ==
The factory started as DA-TA (Demir Araba – Tahta Araba, i.e. Iron Vehicle – Wooden Vehicle) in 1914 in Adapazarı, originally producing horse-drawn vehicles, churns, beehives and threshing machines. The Turkish Agricultural Hardware Institution purchased the plant in 1944, renaming it Sakarya Alat-ı Ziraiye (SAZ) (i.e. Sakarya Agricultural Equipments). The plant had its own thermoelectric plant, supplying electricity to the factory and Sakarya area.

In 1962, the company started importing Ford tractors. Six years later, they had moved on from importing and aftersales to manufacturing them under a license, achieving 65% domestic components rate in production. Later, in 1979, they started producing Austrian Steyr tractors under a similar agreement.

The company was renamed Başak in 1996 and started making tractors under their own brand. Başak joined Sanko group in 2012, now known as ASKO Holding.

In early 2024, it was announced that RostSelMash had sold all shares of Versatile (Buhler Industries) to Basak Traktor, a subsidiary of ASKO Holdings.
