= Dumping =

Dumping may refer to:

== Computing ==
- Recording the contents of memory after application or operating system failure, or by operator request, in a core dump for use in subsequent problem analysis
- Filesystem dump, strict data cloning used in backing up
- Database dump or SQL dump, a record of the data from a database, usually in the form of a list of SQL statements

== Economics ==
- Dumping (pricing policy), in international trade, the pricing of a product below its cost of production
- Social dumping, using transitory labour to save costs
- SUTA dumping, the avoidance of paying unemployment insurance taxes

== Waste management ==
- Environmental dumping, the shipping of waste to a country with lax environmental laws
- Ocean dumping, the deliberate disposal of waste at sea
- Illegal Dumping, the act of illegally dumping material instead of using an authorized method of collecting waste

== Aircraft technology ==
- Fuel dumping, used to lighten the aircraft's weight and flammability in certain emergency situations

== Mathematics ==
- Equivalent dumping coefficient, used in the calculation of the energy dispersed when a building moves

== Medicine ==
- Gastric dumping syndrome, when intestines fill too quickly with undigested food from the stomach
- Homeless dumping, medical workers releasing homeless patients on the streets
- Emergency Medical Treatment and Active Labor Act, a 1986 act of the U.S. Congress to prevent "patient dumping" or the refusal to treat people because of inability to pay

== Other uses ==
- Breakup, in which one romantic partner may be said to be "dumping" the other
- Defecation, the final act of digestion
- Dumpin', a 1999 album by hip-hop group Psychopathic Rydas
- Dumping, deliberately playing poorly; see Glossary of contract bridge terms#D

== See also ==
- Dump (disambiguation)
- Litter
- Dumper (disambiguation)
- Damper (disambiguation)
- Damping (music)
- Dumpling (cuisine)
