= Dumper (disambiguation) =

A dumper is an off-road vehicle designed for carrying bulk material.

Dumper may also refer to:

== Surname ==
- James Dumper, English footballer
- Tony Dumper (1923-2012), English Bishop of Dudley

== Other uses ==
- Dumper (computer program), a computer program that copies data from one source to another
- Dumper (Ender's Game), a character in the Ender's Game science fiction series
- Dump truck, a truck used for transporting loose material for construction
- Rotary car dumper, a mechanism used for unloading railroad cars
- Dumper (Gobots), a heroic fictional character.
- Skip (container), a large metal container for rubbish

== See also ==
- Dump (disambiguation)
- Dumped
- Dumping (disambiguation)
