= Dump =

Dump generally refers to a place for disposal of solid waste, a rubbish dump, or landfill. The word has other uses alone or in combination, and may refer to:

== Arts, entertainment, and media ==
- Dump (band), an alias for the solo recordings of James McNew
- Dump, tape delay (broadcasting)
- Dump months, times when, due to limited box office potential, new movies are generally perceived as being of low quality and limited appeal
- "Dump", a 2025 track by Toby Fox from Deltarune Chapters 3+4 OST from the video game Deltarune

== Computing and technology ==
- Dump (Unix), a Unix program for backing up file systems
- Core dump, inaccurately but consistently referred to as a core dump in Unix-like systems, the recorded state of the working memory of a computer program at a specific time, generally when the program has terminated abnormally (crashed)
- Database dump, a record of the table structure and/or the data from a database
- ROM dump or ROM image, a record of the data in a ROM, EEPROM, or MCU

== Other uses ==
- Dump, Belize, a village in Toledo District, Belize
- The Dump (saloon), a popular saloon and dive bar in New York City during the early to middle 19th century
- Dump (coin), used with the Holey dollar in Australia and Prince Edward Island
- Ammunition dump, military stores of ammunition
- Deoxyuridine monophosphate, or dUMP
- Dump cake, a dessert
- Dump job, a term for criminal disposal of a corpse
- Dump truck, with tippable bed
- Dump valve, used to release pressure, e.g. in turbochargers or diving suits
- Dump, slang for unilateral break up of a personal relationship
- Take a dump, slang for a bowel movement

== See also ==
- Litter, waste disposed of improperly
- Double dump valve, in material handling
- Dumper (disambiguation)
- Dumping (disambiguation)
- Dumped, a British reality television programme
- Midden, historically a dump for domestic waste
