= Nobu Su =

Taiwanese businessman

Nobu Su (Chinese: 蘇信吉) is the CEO and owner of the Taipei-based shipping company Today Makes Tomorrow (TMT).

== Education ==
He graduated with a Bachelor of Science (B.Sc.) in economics from Keio University in Tokyo, Japan, and earned a M.B.A. from the International Institute for Management Development (IMD) in 1982.

== Entrepreneurship ==
Su has also designed an underdeck piping structure for ships, which he patented in Japan, Korea and China, which he has allowed shipping companies to use without license. Su’s underdeck piping system for ships is currently in commercial use.

On 19 April 2011, Su was given the Lifetime Achievement for Entrepreneurship award at the international ShipTek conference.

== Shipping business ==
Su has turned TMT, his company, into an operator of real tankers and dry bulk ships. Under his direction TMT has expanded its fleet to include drybulk carriers, very large crude carriers, cargo carriers, liquefied natural gas carriers, automobile carriers, and cement carriers

The most recent vessel purchases have been in Capesize dry-bulk carriers as well investments into oil tankers. TMT has a number of business partners and charters from companies like Chevron and COA, for crude oil transport and cement transport. In February 2017 it was revealed that in 2013 he ran afoul of US trade sanctions against Iran.

== Legal issues ==
In June 2013 Su filed for US Chapter 11 bankruptcy protection after being put under pressure by Taiwanese creditors, then in 2015 appealed a $47m judgement against him in a long-standing case against Lakatamia.

In March 2019 Su was found guilty in London of 15 out of the 17 counts of contempt of court with which he was charged and is now serving a 21-month prison sentence at the category 'B' HM Prison Pentonville in Islington, north London. In July 2021, he was sentenced with another two years for contempt of court.

== Pan-Asian activism ==
Through TMT, he has invested in a number of regional shipping companies and ship construction companies.

Su has stated that he plans to expand the reach of Asian companies into other investments and markets, with a plan to invest in a liquefaction company in São Tomé and Principe to produce natural gas.
