= VARAMAR =

Shipping company

- Company type: Private
- Industry: Shipping
- Founded: 2009
- Area served: Worldwide
- Services: Breakbulk, Dry-bulk, Oversized, RO-RO, Containers
- Website: VARAMAR Official Website

VARAMAR is a shipping company founded in 2009, specializing in breakbulk, heavy & oversized, and dry-bulk cargo.

The company operates globally, offering tramp and semi-liner services. Its offices are located in 13 countries.

It also has a wide network of agents in numerous African countries, the Americas, Asia-Pacific, Europe, and the Middle East.

== History ==
VARAMAR, founded in 2009, is well known as a carrier dealing with breakbulk, heavy & oversized, and dry-bulk cargo. For over a decade, the company has developed transport solutions for dismantled plants, factories, wind turbines, bridges, vehicles, and even stadiums. It has created proprietary methods based on in-house competences and offers a strong set-up for worldwide shipments. It has developed customized transport services for complex cargo, including dismantled plants, wind turbines, and bridges. In 2023, VARAMAR's founder launched an online fixing platform that enhances efficiency in the shipping industry.

The company operates globally, offering tramp and semi-liner services. Its offices are located in 13 countries.

== Fleet and operations ==
Varamar primarily operates a fleet of vessels ranging from 3,000 to 30,000 deadweight tons (DWT), allowing the company to handle various cargo sizes and types. The company initially focused on trade routes connecting Europe with the Middle East, Asia, and the Far East. However, it has since expanded its services to include routes to Africa and the Americas. Varamar has established a global presence through its network of offices and agent representations. Key office locations include Belgium, Germany, Italy, Greece, Ukraine, Turkey, the United Arab Emirates, China, Canada, the United States, and Spain.

The company also has a wide network of agents in numerous African countries, the Americas, Asia-Pacific, Europe, and the Middle East.

VARAMAR offers specialized shipping services for various types of cargo, including:

- Breakbulk: handling large, heavy, and unconventional shipments, such as dismantled factories and green energy equipment.
- Dry-bulk: transporting materials like grains and minerals securely and timely.
- Oversized: expertise in shipping large industrial machinery and structures.
- RO-RO: facilitating smooth transport of wheeled equipment and heavy machinery.
- Containers: providing efficient container shipping services for both small and large shipments.

Varamar is also recognised for its capacity in the breakbulk sector, where it ships cargo such as wind turbine components, cables, drilling rigs, cranes, industrial equipment, yachts, transformers, engines, turbines, vehicles, and various steel products.

The company maintains strategic partnerships with several shipping firms, including Vartom, Cosco, and ECL.
