= Dumping (pricing policy) =

Setting prices artificially low to discourage competition

Dumping, in economics, is a form of predatory pricing, especially in the context of international trade. It occurs when manufacturers export a product to another country at a price below the normal price with an injuring effect. The objective of dumping is to increase market share in a foreign market by driving out competition and thereby create a monopoly situation where the exporter will be able to unilaterally dictate price and quality of the product. Trade treaties might include mechanisms to alleviate problems related to dumping, such as countervailing duty penalties and anti-dumping statutes.

== Overview ==
A standard technical definition of dumping is the act of charging a lower price for the like product in a foreign market than the normal value of the product, for example the price of the same product in a domestic market of the exporter or in a third country market. This is often referred to as selling at less than "normal value" on the same level of trade in the ordinary course of trade. Under the World Trade Organization's Antidumping Agreement, full name Agreement on Implementation of Article VI of the General Agreement on Tariffs and Trade 1994, dumping is not prohibited unless it causes or threatens to cause material injury to a domestic industry in the importing country. Dumping is also prohibited when it causes "material retardation" in the establishment of an industry in the domestic market.

The term has a negative connotation, as advocates of competitive markets see "dumping" as a form of unfair competition. Furthermore, advocates for workers and laborers believe that safeguarding businesses against such practices, such as dumping, help alleviate some of the harsher consequences of such practices between economies at different stages of development (see protectionism). The Bolkestein directive, for example, was accused in Europe of being a form of "social dumping", as it favored competition between workers, as exemplified by the Polish plumber stereotype. While there are few examples of a national scale dumping that succeeded in producing a national-level monopoly, there are several examples of local "dumping" that produced a monopoly in regional markets for certain industries. Ron Chernow points to the example of regional oil monopolies in Titan: The Life of John D. Rockefeller, Sr. where oil in one market, Cincinnati, would be sold at or below cost to drive competition's profits down and force them to exit the market. In another area where other independent businesses were already driven out, namely in Chicago, prices would be increased by a quarter.

Third country dumping refers to a situation in which exports of a product from one country are being injured or threatened with injury because of exports of a product from a second country into a third country at less than fair value.

== Anti-dumping actions ==
=== Legal issues ===
If a company exports a product at a price that is lower than the price it normally charges in its own home market, or sells at a price that does not meet its full cost of production, it is said to be "dumping" the product. It is a sub part of the various forms of price discrimination and is classified as third-degree price discrimination. Opinions differ as to whether or not such practice constitutes unfair competition, but many governments take action against dumping to protect domestic industry. The WTO agreement does not pass judgment. Its focus is on how governments can or cannot react to dumping—it disciplines anti-dumping actions, and it is often called the "anti-dumping agreement". (This focus only on the reaction to dumping contrasts with the approach of the subsidies and countervailing measures agreement.)

The legal definitions are more precise, but broadly speaking, the WTO agreement allows governments to act against dumping where there is genuine ("material") injury to the competing domestic industry. To do so, the government has to show that dumping is taking place, calculate the extent of dumping (how much lower the export price is compared to the exporter's home market price), and show that the dumping is causing injury or threatening to cause injury.

=== Definitions and extent ===
While permitted by the WTO, General Agreement on Tariffs and Trade (GATT) (Article VI) allows countries the option of taking action against dumping. The Anti-Dumping Agreement clarifies and expands Article VI, and the two operate together. They allow countries to act in a way that would normally break the GATT principles of binding a tariff and not discriminating between trading partners—typically anti-dumping action means charging extra import duty on the particular product from the particular exporting country, in order to bring its price closer to the "normal value" or to remove the injury to domestic industry in the importing country.

There are many different ways of calculating whether a particular product is being dumped heavily or only lightly. The agreement narrows down the range of possible options, providing three methods to calculate a product's "normal value". The main one is based on the price in the exporter's domestic market. When this cannot be used, two alternatives are available, the price charged by the exporter in another country, or a calculation based on the combination of the exporter's production costs, other expenses and normal profit margins. The agreement also specifies how a fair comparison can be made between the export price and what would be a normal price.

=== Five-percent rule ===
According to footnote 2 to the Anti-Dumping Agreement, domestic sales of the like product are sufficient to base normal value on if they account for 5 percent or more of the sales of the product under consideration to the importing country market. This is often called the five-percent or home-market-viability test. This test is applied globally by comparing the quantity sold of a like product on the domestic market with the quantity sold to the importing market.

Normal value cannot be based on the price in the exporter's domestic market when there are no domestic sales, for example if the products are only sold on the foreign market. The normal value will then have to be determined on another basis. Additionally, some products may be sold on both markets but the quantity sold on the domestic market may be small compared to quantity sold on a foreign market. This situation happens often in countries with small domestic markets like Hong Kong and Singapore, though similar circumstances may also happen in larger markets. This is because of differences in factors like consumer taste and maintenance.

Calculating the extent of dumping on a product is not enough. Anti-dumping measures can only be applied if the act of dumping is harming the industry in the importing country. Therefore, a detailed investigation must first be conducted according to specified rules. The investigation must evaluate all relevant economic factors that have a bearing on the state of the industry in question; if it is revealed that dumping is taking place and hurting domestic industry, the exporting company can raise its price to an agreed level in order to avoid anti-dumping import duties.

=== Procedures in investigation and litigation ===
Detailed procedures are set out on how anti-dumping cases are to be initiated, how the investigations are to be conducted, and the conditions for ensuring that all interested parties are given an opportunity to present evidence. Anti-dumping measures must expire five years after the date of imposition, unless a review shows that ending the measure would lead to injury.

Generally speaking, an anti-dumping investigation usually develops along the following steps: domestic producers make a request to the relevant authority to initiate an anti-dumping investigation. Then investigation to the foreign producer is conducted to determine if the allegation is valid. It uses questionnaires completed by the interested parties to compare the foreign producer's (or producers') export price to the normal value (the price in the exporter's domestic market, the price charged by the exporter in another country, or a calculation based on the combination of the exporter's production costs, other expenses and normal profit margins). If the foreign producer's export price is lower than the normal price and the investigating body proves a causal link between the alleged dumping and the injury suffered by the domestic industry, it comes to a conclusion that the foreign producer is dumping its products. According to Article VI of GATT, dumping investigations shall, except in special circumstances, be concluded within one year, and in no case more than 18 months after initiation. Anti-dumping measures must expire five years after the date of imposition, unless a review shows that ending the measure would lead to injury.

Anti-dumping investigations are to end immediately in cases where the authorities determine that the margin of dumping is, de minimis, or insignificantly small (defined as less than 2% of the export price of the product). Other conditions are also set. For example, the investigations also have to end if the volume of dumped imports is negligible (i.e., if the volume from one country is less than 3% of total imports of that product—although investigations can proceed if several countries, each supplying less than 3% of the imports, together account for 7% or more of total imports).

The agreement says member countries must inform the Committee on Anti-Dumping Practices about all preliminary and final anti-dumping actions, promptly and in detail. They must also report on all investigations twice a year. When differences arise, members are encouraged to consult each other. They can also use the WTO's dispute settlement procedure.

=== Abuse of anti-dumping measures ===
Although anti-dumping measures play a vital rule in preventing protectionism and promote free trade, many instances of anti-dumping practices suggest that anti-dumping measures have been used as a tool of protectionism. India and China have been alleged to have used Anti-dumping Duty (ADD) as a form of "safety valve" – to ease competitive pressure in domestic market. Anti-dumping measures have also been used as a form of "retaliation" against products of countries that impose ADDs against the products of the host country. The USA has been consistently alleged to have abused anti-dumping measures with its practice of zeroing. Between 1980 and 1997, in only around 2% of cases the EC/EU had been found to have imposed ADDs to offset dumping. In the remaining 98%, cases of anti-dumping between 1980 and 1997 may have been used for purposes other than offsetting dumping.

== By country ==
=== United States ===
In the United States, domestic firms can file an anti-dumping petition under the regulations determined by the U.S. Department of Commerce, which determines "less than fair value" and the International Trade Commission, which determines "injury". These proceedings operate on a timetable governed by U.S. law. The Department of Commerce has regularly found that products have been sold at less than fair value in U.S. markets. If the domestic industry is able to establish that it is being injured by the dumping, then anti-dumping duties are imposed on goods imported from the dumpers' country at a percentage rate calculated to counteract the dumping margin. In 2021, this happened when the US Aluminum Association filed a complaint to the Department of Commerce against Armenia and several other countries claiming that due to "aggressively low-priced import of the aluminum", it is being sold at less than fair value. Because of that Biden administration has introduced an anti-dumping measure of Armenian exporters being obliged to pay a deposit equal to 188.4% of the product value at the Customs.

Related to anti-dumping duties are "countervailing duties". The difference is that countervailing duties seek to offset injurious subsidization while anti-dumping duties offset injurious dumping.

Some commentators have noted that domestic protectionism, and lack of knowledge regarding foreign cost of production, lead to the unpredictable institutional process surrounding investigation. Members of the WTO can file complaints against anti-dumping measures.

Because of the 1997 Asian financial crisis, October 27, 1997 mini-crash, and 1998 Russian financial crisis, the United States steel producers were severely harmed by a record surge of more than 40 million tons of cheap steel imports, resulting in the loss of more than 10,000 steel production jobs in 1998, and was the imminent cause of three bankruptcies by medium-sized steel companies (Acme Steel, Laclede Steel, and Geneva Steel), reduced volume, lower prices, and affecting the willingness of private banks and investment institutions to make loans to the U.S. steel producers. As a result, Congress passed the Emergency Steel Loan Guarantee and Emergency Oil and Gas Guaranteed Loan Act of 1999, also known as the Emergency Steel Loan Guarantee Act of 1999.

Section 1318 of the Omnibus Trade and Competitiveness Act of 1988 (PL 100-418) establishes procedures for US industries to petition the US Trade Representative to request a foreign government that is a signatory to the GATT Anti-Dumping Code to initiate an antidumping investigation on behalf of a US industry that claims it is being injured by dumping in that country's market.

=== European Union ===
European Union anti-dumping actions are under the purview of the European Commission. The Commission is obliged to launch an anti-dumping investigation if it receives a valid complaint from an EU industry providing sufficient evidence that exporting producers from one or more countries are dumping a particular product onto the EU market and causing injury to the EU industry. Regulation (EC) No 2423/88 was the first regulation applicable to this policy field.

Later actions were governed by Council Regulation (EC) No 384/96 of 22 December 1995 on protection against dumped imports from countries not members of the European Community (as it then was), and Council Regulation (EC) No 1225/2009 of 30 November 2009 on protection against dumped imports from countries not members of the European Community. However, implementation of anti-dumping actions (trade defence actions) is taken after voting by various committees with member state representation.

Regulation (EC) No 384/96 was repealed by Regulation (EC) No 1225/2009; however, the repeal of the 1996 regulation did not prejudice the validity of proceedings already underway. Regulation (EU) 2016/1036 of the European Parliament and of the Council of 8 June 2016 on protection against dumped imports from countries not members of the European Union (codification) now applies.

EU regulations provide for a compulsory "lesser duty rule", which states that the level of the duty imposed must be limited to "the minimum level necessary to offset [the] injury" caused to the EU industry. The European Commission put forward a proposal in 2013 which would remove the "lesser duty rule" in some cases, where circumvention of the rules, subsidies, or "structural raw material distortions" are in operation, i.e. where states "interfere [with] trade of raw materials with a view to keeping raw materials in those countries for the benefit of domestic downstream users, for instance by imposing export taxes or operating dual pricing schemes". The European Parliament and the Council agreed in the modernisation of EU trade defence legislation that the rule would no longer apply in anti-subsidy proceedings from mid-2018.

The bureaucratic entity responsible for advising member states on anti-dumping actions is the Directorate General Trade (DG Trade) in Brussels. Community industry can apply to have an anti-dumping investigation begin. DG Trade first investigates the standing of the complainants. If they are found to represent at least 25% of community industry, the investigation will probably begin. The process is guided by quite specific guidance in the regulations. The DG Trade will make a recommendation to a committee known as the Anti-Dumping Advisory Committee, on which each member state has one vote. Member states abstaining will be treated as if they voted in favour of industrial protection, a voting system which has come under considerable criticism. The dumping investigation includes comparison of domestic prices of the accused dumping nation with prices of the imported product on the European market. However, several rules are applied to the data before the dumping margin is calculated. Most contentious is the concept of "analogue market".

As is implied by the criterion for beginning an investigation, EU anti-dumping actions are primarily considered part of a "trade defence" portfolio. Consumer interests and non-industry related interests ("community interests") are not emphasized during an investigation. An investigation typically looks for damage caused by dumping to community producers, and the level of tariff set is based on the damage done to community producers by dumping.

If no consensus is reached, the decision is referred to the European Council.

If imposed, theoretically duties last for five years. In practice they last at least a year longer, because expiry reviews are usually initiated at the end of the five years, and during the review process the status quo is maintained.

==== Common Agricultural Policy ====
The Common Agricultural Policy of the European Union has often been accused of dumping despite significant reforms, as part of the Agreement on Agriculture at the Uruguay round of GATT negotiations in 1992 and in subsequent incremental reforms, notably the Luxembourg Agreement in 2003. Initially, the CAP sought to increase European agricultural production and provide support to European farmers through a process of market intervention whereby a special fund, the European Agricultural Guidance and Guarantee Fund, would buy up surplus agricultural produce if the price fell below the centrally-determined intervention level.

European farmers were given a "guaranteed" price for their produce when it was sold in the European Community, and a system of export reimbursements ensured that European exports would sell at or below world prices, at no detriment to the European producer. The policy was heavily criticised as distorting world trade, and since 1992, the policy has moved away from market intervention and towards direct payments to farmers regardless of production, called "decoupling". Furthermore, the payments are generally dependent on farmers fulfilling certain environmental or animal welfare requirements to encourage responsible, sustainable farming in what is termed "multifunctional" agricultural subsidies. Social, environmental and other benefits of subsidies would no longer not include a simple increase in production.

=== China ===
Some exporting nations are not granted "market economy status": China is a prime example because its market status is considered "state-sponsored capitalism". In such cases, the DG Trade is prevented from using domestic prices as the fair measure of the domestic price. A particular export industry may also lose market status if the DG Trade concludes that this industry receives government assistance. Other tests applied include the application of international accounting standards and bankruptcy laws. The consequences of not being granted market economy status have a big impact on the investigation. For example, if China is accused of dumping widgets, the basic approach is to consider the price of widgets in China against the price of Chinese widgets in Europe. But China does not have market economy status, so Chinese domestic prices cannot be used as the reference. Instead, the DG Trade must decide upon an analogue market: a market which does have market economy status, and which is similar enough to China. Brazil and Mexico have been used, but the United States is a popular analogue market. In this case, the price of widgets in the United States is regarded as the substitute for the price of widgets in China. This process of choosing an analogue market is subject to the influence of the complainant, which has led to some criticism that it is an inherent bias in the process.

Critics have argued that it is quite unreasonable to compare China's goods price to the United States as analogue. China is now developing to a more free and open market, unlike its planned-economy in the early 1960s, the market in China is more willing to embrace the global competition. It is thus required to improve its market regulations and conquer the free trade barriers to improve the situation and produce a properly judged pricing level to assess the "dumping" behaviour.

An example of an anti-dumping duty action taken by the European Union is that of the duty imposed upon bicycle imports from China into the EU, which has been continued at a rate of 48.5%. The tax has also been extended to imports from Indonesia, Malaysia, Sri Lanka and Tunisia. However, some companies are excluded or have a reduced rate.

On 6 May 2026, Australia imposed anti-dumping tariff of up to 82% on import of China's hot-rolled coil steel, following an investigation by Anti- Dumping Commission.

=== India ===
The current set of anti-dumping laws in India is defined by Section 9A and 9B of Customs and Tariffs Act, 1975 (Amended 1995) and The Anti-dumping rules such as (Identification, Assessment and Collection of Anti-dumping Duty on Dumped Articles and for Determination of Injury) Rules of 1995, Section 9A of customs and tariffs Act 1975 states that "If any article is exported from any country or territory to India at less than its normal value, then, upon the importation of such article into India, the central government may by notification in the official gazette, impose an anti-dumping duty not exceeding the margin of dumping in relation to such article." As of November 28, 2016, 353 anti-dumping cases has been initiated by Directorate General of Anti-Dumping and Allied Duties (DGAD) out of which in one hundred and thirty cases, anti-dumping measures are in force. In January 2017, the Indian government imposed anti-dumping duty on colour coated steel products imported from the European Union and China for 6 months.

Though, the move was applauded by Essar Steel India Commercial Director, H Shivram Krishnan but, importers expressed their concern regarding protective measures like minimum import price and anti-dumping duty especially when domestic is narrowing and imports are falling.

In July 2015, the government imposed anti-dumping duty on fibreboard imported from Indonesia and Vietnam. This came after CEO and joint-Managing Director of Greenply Industries, Shobhan Mittal filed an application for anti-dumping probe initiation. The primary reason behind the probe was that the price differential between domestic and imported MDF stood at 5–6 percent and net MDF imports was at around 30–35 percent, majority of which came from Indonesia and Vietnam.

On 8 March 2017, the government of India imposed anti-dumping duty ranging from US$6.30 to US$351.72 per tonne on imports of jute and its products from Bangladesh and Nepal. Later the government of India withdrew the anti-dumping duty in case of Nepal.

On 26 October 2017, India imposed anti-dumping duty on stainless steel from US, EU and China.

India has imposed anti-dumping duty on certain stainless steel products from the European Union and other nations including China and Korea, in order to protect the domestic industry from cheap imports.

The duty was imposed by the Revenue department following the recommendation by the Directorate General of Anti-Dumping and Allied Duties (DGAD).

- The levied duty will range between 4.58 per cent and 57.39 per cent of the landed value of cold-rolled flat products of stainless steel.
- The anti-dumping duty will be in effect until 10 December 2020.
- The direction however, exempts certain grades of stainless steel from the duty.
- The duty will be levied on the imports of stainless steel products from China, Taiwan, South Korea, South Africa, Thailand, the United States and the European Union.

On 22nd December 2023, India imposed anti-dumping duty on the imports of industrial laser machines, including laser cutting, marking, and welding machines, originating in or exported from China. The duty was imposed by the Revenue department by the recommendation of the Directorate General of Anti-Dumping and Allied Duties (DGAD).

- The Central Government has imposed anti-dumping duties ranging from 24.66% to 147.20% of the CIF value on industrial laser machines imported from China.
- The duty applies to imports from China, regardless of the country of export.
- The anti-dumping duty will be in effect for 5 years from the date of notification, unless revoked or amended earlier.

Exemptions

- The anti-dumping duty does not apply to imports of industrial laser machines produced by certain Chinese producers, who were found to not be dumping.

=== Israel ===
Israel's anti-dumping and countervailing duty tribunal is the Trade Levies Commission.

=== South Korea ===
After South Korea switched its diplomatic recognition from the Republic of China on Taiwan to the People's Republic of China in 1992, the ROC filed anti-dumping lawsuits against South Korea.

== See also ==
- Countervailing duties – Import tariffs imposed on goods found to be unfairly subsidized by their exporter
- Flooding the market – When excessive supply lowers prices to unsustainably low levels
- Import tariff – Goods import or export tax
- Infant industry argument – Rationale for protectionism
- Loss-leading – Product sold below cost to stimulate other, more profitable sales
- Safeguard – Restraint to protect home or national industries from foreign competition
- Predatory pricing – Deliberately undercutting prices to eliminate competition
- World Trade Organization – Intergovernmental trade organization
