= Today Makes Tomorrow =

Taiwanese shipping company

- Predecessor: Taiwan Maritime Transport Co. Ltd
- Founded: 1958

Today Makes Tomorrow (TMT) is a Taiwanese shipping company that in 2008 directly owned some 60 ships, with many more on order, including dry bulk, crude, cargo, LNG, automobile, and cement carriers.

== History ==
=== Taiwan Maritime Transport Co. ===
TMT Co. Ltd was founded as the Taiwan Maritime Transport Co. Ltd in 1958. The company began by operating in the banana export business. The company’s first boat was named Taiwan Banana in Chinese. It expanded over the years into different sectors and, at one point, had 10% of the world's wood chip carrier capacity.

=== Change of ownership ===
Mr Nobu Su is TMT’s current owner and CEO. He took over after his father, Ching Wun Su, who founded the company, died in 2002. Over the years that followed TMT expanded rapidly, with ten new dry bulk carriers, roll-on roll-off ships for automobile freight, crude petroleum supertankers, very large bulk carriers (VLBC) and a Liquefied Natural Gas (LNG) carrier. At one point, the company operated more than 130 ships.

In 2007 the company was rebranded and its acronym redefined to mean Today Makes Tomorrow.

=== Futures market ===
TMT Group has invested significant resources in the forward freight agreement (FFA) market. It entered the market in 2004 and at one point was reported as being responsible for almost 30% of the global trade in FFA.

=== Ships ===
TMT group operates the "Whale" crude supertankers, part of a series of sister tankers named A Whale, B Whale, and so on until H Whale. TMT's ships are registered separately in Monrovia and sail under a Liberian flag.

=== Recent contracts ===
TMT signed a contract with Chevron in September 2013 for one of its largest carriers, C Elephants, to carry crude petroleum.

== See also ==
- List of companies of Taiwan
