= Zeroing (disambiguation) =

Zeroing may refer to:

- Calibration, comparison of measurements of a device with a standard of known accuracy
- Sighting in a firearm so bullets strike the point of aim
- Zeroing (trade), a methodology used by the U.S. for calculating antidumping duties against foreign products
- Reducing to zero
- A fictional speedcubing technique allegedly used by Feliks Zemdegs.

== See also ==
- Zero Wing, electronic game
- Zero ring, in mathematics
