= Social dumping =

Anti-competitive practice

Social dumping is a practice whereby employers use cheaper labour than is usually available at their site of production or sale, for example by moving production to a low-wage country or area, or employing poorly-paid migrant workers. Employers thus save money and potentially increase their profits. Systemic criticism suggests that as a result, governments are tempted to enter a so-called social policy regime competition by reducing their labour and social standards to ease labour costs on enterprises and to retain business activity within their jurisdiction.

In the European Union, there is a controversy around whether social dumping takes advantage of the Bolkestein directive.

== Policy issues ==
A joint NGO statement on the EU Seasonal Migrant Workers' Directive also warns against social dumping. The document argues that a vague definition of seasonal work might fail to cover all types of seasonal employment taking place when the Directive exerts its otherwise-welcome protective measures on the labour market.

Marianne Thyssen, European Commissioner for Employment, Social Affairs, Skills and Labour Mobility, has noted that "there is no definition of the concept of "social dumping" in EC law".

== See also ==
- Dumping (pricing policy)
- SUTA dumping
