= Bulk material handling =

Engineering field

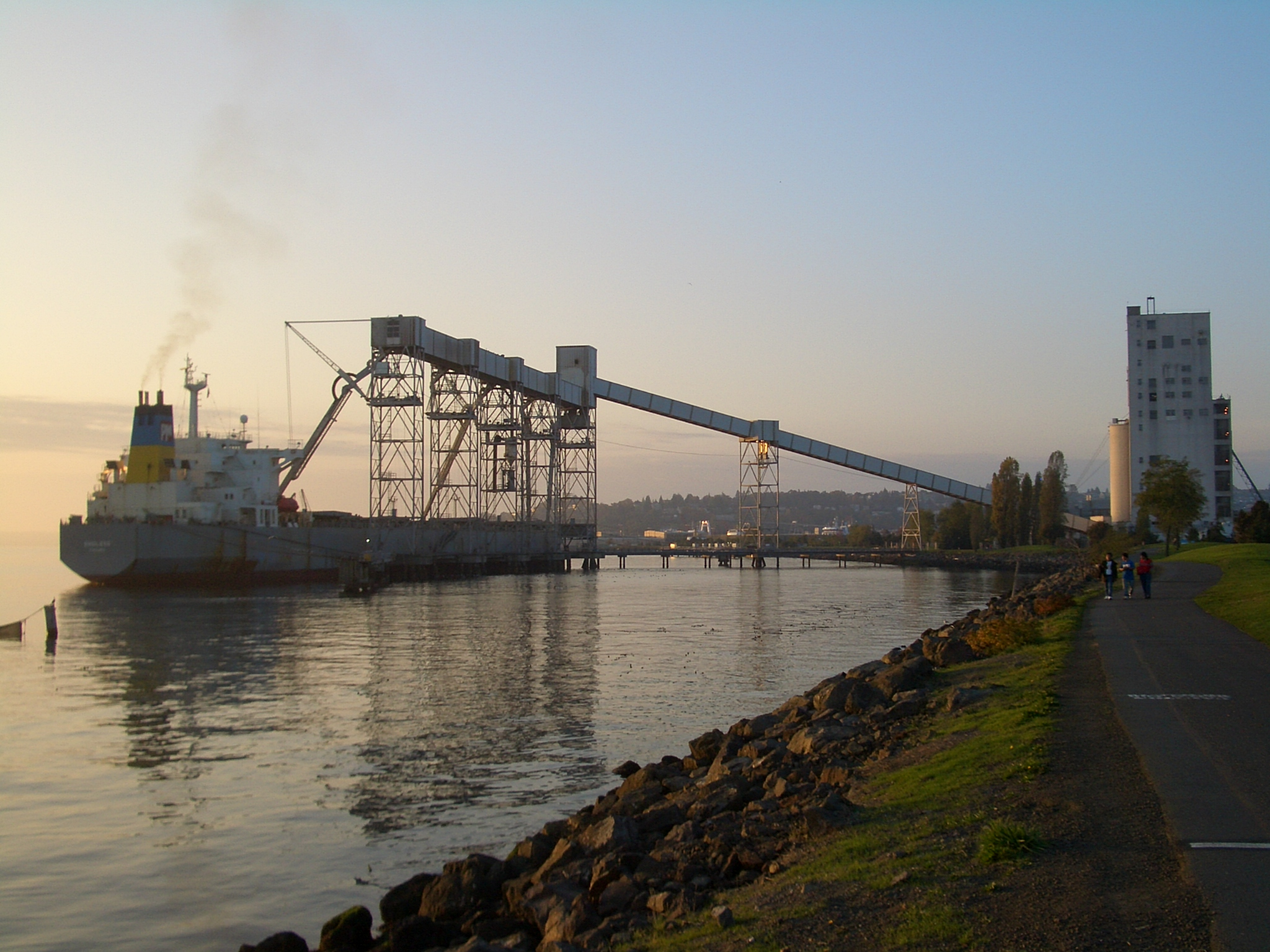
A ship being loaded at Pier 86 Grain Terminal in Seattle

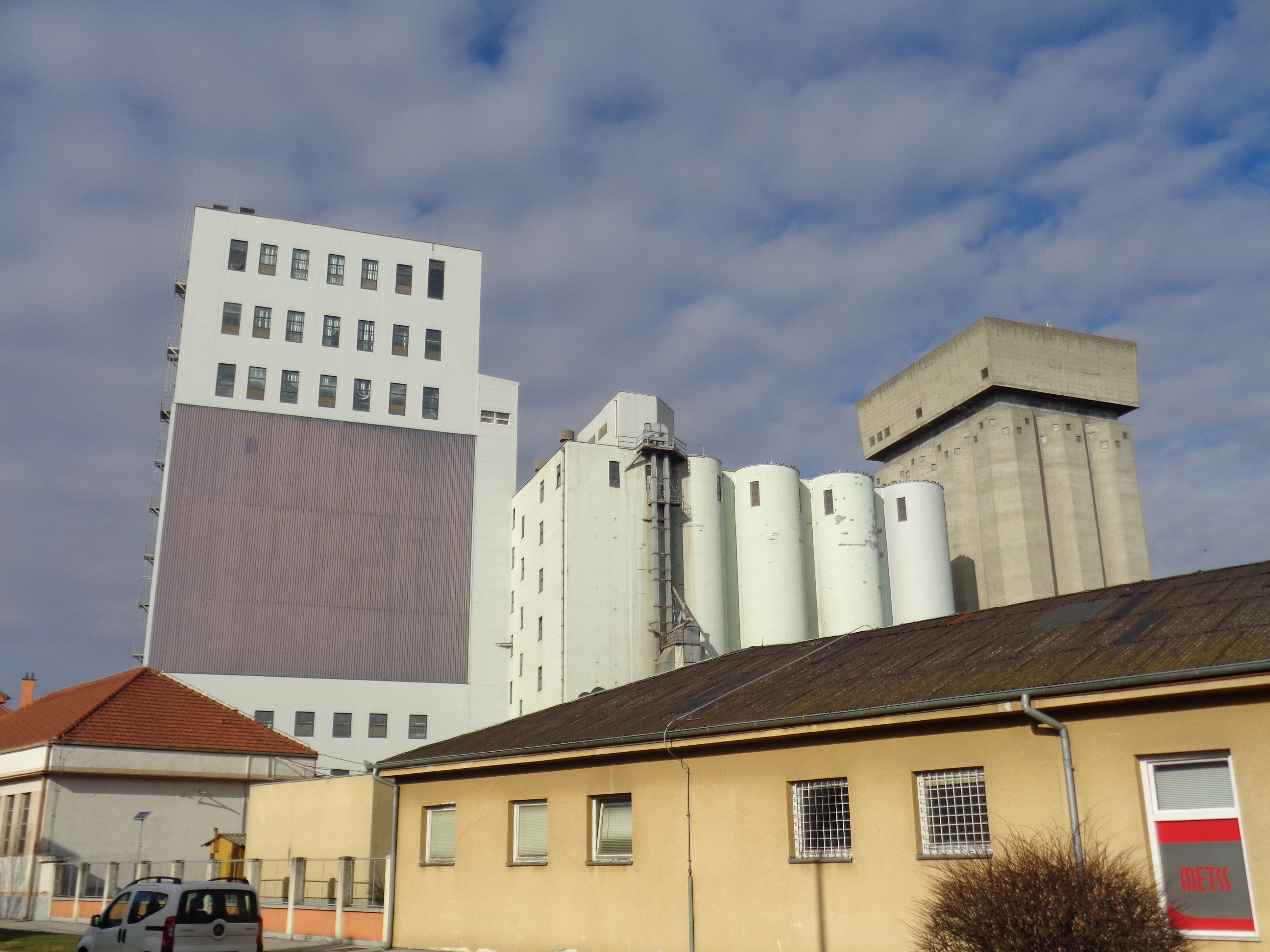
Concrete grain storage silos

Bulk material handling is an engineering field that is centered on the design of equipment used for the handling of dry materials. Bulk materials are those dry materials which are powdery, granular or lumpy in nature, and are stored in heaps. Examples of bulk materials are minerals, ores, coal, cereals, woodchips, sand, gravel, clay, cement, ash, salt, chemicals, grain, sugar, flour and stone in loose bulk form. It can also relate to the handling of mixed wastes. Bulk material handling is an essential part of all industries that process bulk ingredients, including: food, beverage, confectionery, pet food, animal feed, tobacco, chemical, agricultural, polymer, plastic, rubber, ceramic, electronics, metals, minerals, paint, paper, textiles and more.

Major characteristics of bulk materials, so far as their handling is concerned, are: lump size, bulk weight (density), moisture content, flowability (particle mobility), angle of repose, abrasiveness and corrosivity, among others.

Bulk material handling systems are typically composed of stationary machinery such as conveyor belts, screw conveyors, tubular drag conveyors, moving floors, toploaders, stackers, reclaimers, bucket elevators, truck dumpers, railcar dumpers or wagon tipplers, shiploaders, hoppers and diverters and various mobile equipment such as loaders, mobile hopper loaders / unloaders, various shuttles, combined with storage facilities such as stockyards, storage silos or stockpiles. Advanced bulk material handling systems feature integrated bulk storage (silos), conveying (mechanical or pneumatic), and discharge.

The purpose of a bulk material handling facility may be to transport material from one of several locations (i.e. a source) to an ultimate destination or to process material such as ore in concentrating and smelting or handling materials for manufacturing such as logs, wood chips and sawdust at sawmills and paper mills. Other industries using bulk materials handling include flour mills and coal-fired utility boilers.

Providing storage and inventory control and possibly material blending is usually part of a bulk material handling system.

In ports handling large quantities of bulk materials continuous ship unloaders are replacing gantry cranes.

== Other materials handling classifications (non-bulk) ==
Non-bulk materials handling classifications include palletization and containerization.

== See also ==
- Bulk cargo
- Bulk carrier
- Caking
- Double dump valve
- Materials handling
- Rotary car dumper
- Self-discharger
