= Evelyne Gebhardt =

German politician (born 1954)

Evelyne Gebhardt MEP
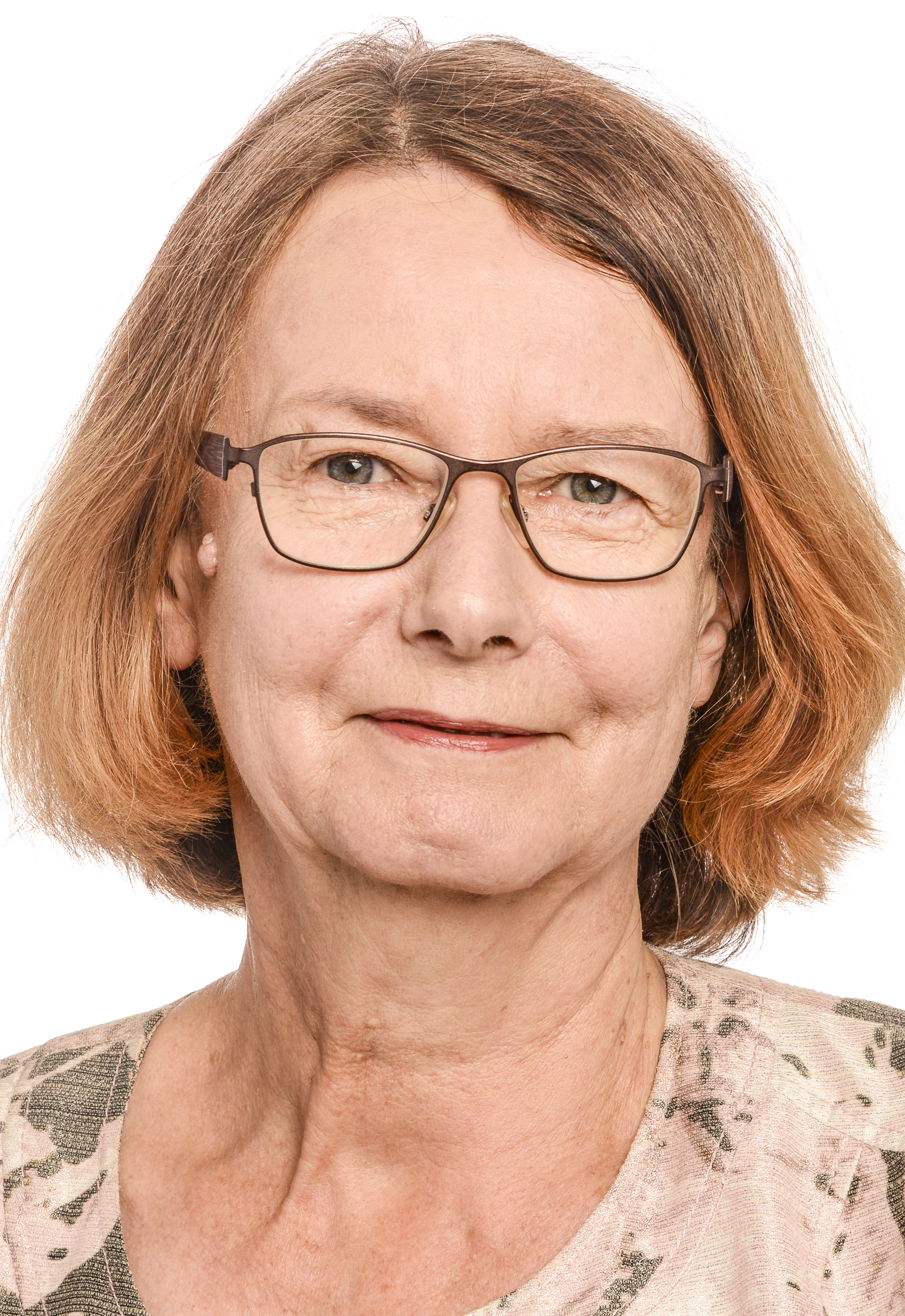

Member of the European Parliament
- In office 1 July 1994 – 1 February 2022
- Succeeded by: René Repasi
- Constituency: Germany

Personal details
- Born: 19 January 1954 (age 72) Paris, France
- Party: German: Social Democratic Party; EU: Party of European Socialists
- Education: Paris Diderot University
- Website: www.evelyne-gebhardt.eu

Evelyne Marie-Thérèse Gebhardt (born 19 January 1954) is a German politician who served as a Member of the European Parliament (MEP) from 1994 to 2022. She is a member of the Social Democratic Party of Germany, part of the Party of European Socialists.

Her main interests are bio-ethics, consumer protection and citizens' rights.

== Early life and education ==
Gebhardt was born in a suburb of Paris. Her father was an industrial chimney sweeper and her mother worked as a translator for Kodak.

After graduating from Lycée Lamartine in 1972, Gebhardt became the first in her family to go to university. She studied at the University Paris Diderot, the University of Tübingen and the University of Stuttgart, studying linguistics, political science and political economy. She subsequently worked as a freelance translator, and moved to Germany in 1975. Since 1992 she has been Chair of the Working Group of Social-Democratic Women. After working in local politics with the SPD, she took out German nationality in 1993, which allowed her to stand for elected office.

In 1999, Gebhardt was awarded the Federal Cross of Merit (with ribbon).

== Member of the European Parliament, 1994–2022 ==
In parliament, Gebhardt was a member of the Committee on the Internal Market and Consumer Protection and of the parliament’s delegation for relations with the People's Republic of China. She was also a substitute member for the Committee on Civil Liberties, Justice and Home Affairs and the Delegation for relations with the Korean Peninsula. In addition, she was a member of the European Parliament Intergroup on the Western Sahara and of the European Parliament Intergroup on LGBT Rights.

Gebhardt is best known for her role in shaping the controversial Services Directive in 2005 and 2006. The directive had aimed at opening up the European Single Market to competition amongst service providers but was, after much political pressure from mostly western and southern EU countries, subsequently watered down by the European Parliament. Gebhardt was parliamentary rapporteur for the directive and played an important role in facilitating an agreement with the European People's Party which allowed Parliament to pass the directive with a huge majority and thereby forcing EU governments to follow their line.

Along with Kaja Kallas, Gebhardt served as rapporteur for the digital single market in 2016.

From 2017 to 2019, Gebhardt served as one of the fourteen vice-presidents of the European Parliament under the leadership of Antonio Tajani.

In November 2021, Gebhardt announced that she would resign from the European Parliament by February 2022.

== Other activities ==
- Europa-Union Deutschland, Member of the Presidium
- German Academy for Ethics in Medicine (AEM), Member
- Association of Free Art Schools in Baden-Württemberg, Member of the Board of Trustees
- Europa Zentrum Baden-Württemberg, Member of the Advisory Board
- Gegen Vergessen – Für Demokratie, Member
- Marie-Schlei-Verein, Member
- German United Services Trade Union (ver.di), Member
