= René Repasi =

German politician

René Repasi MEP
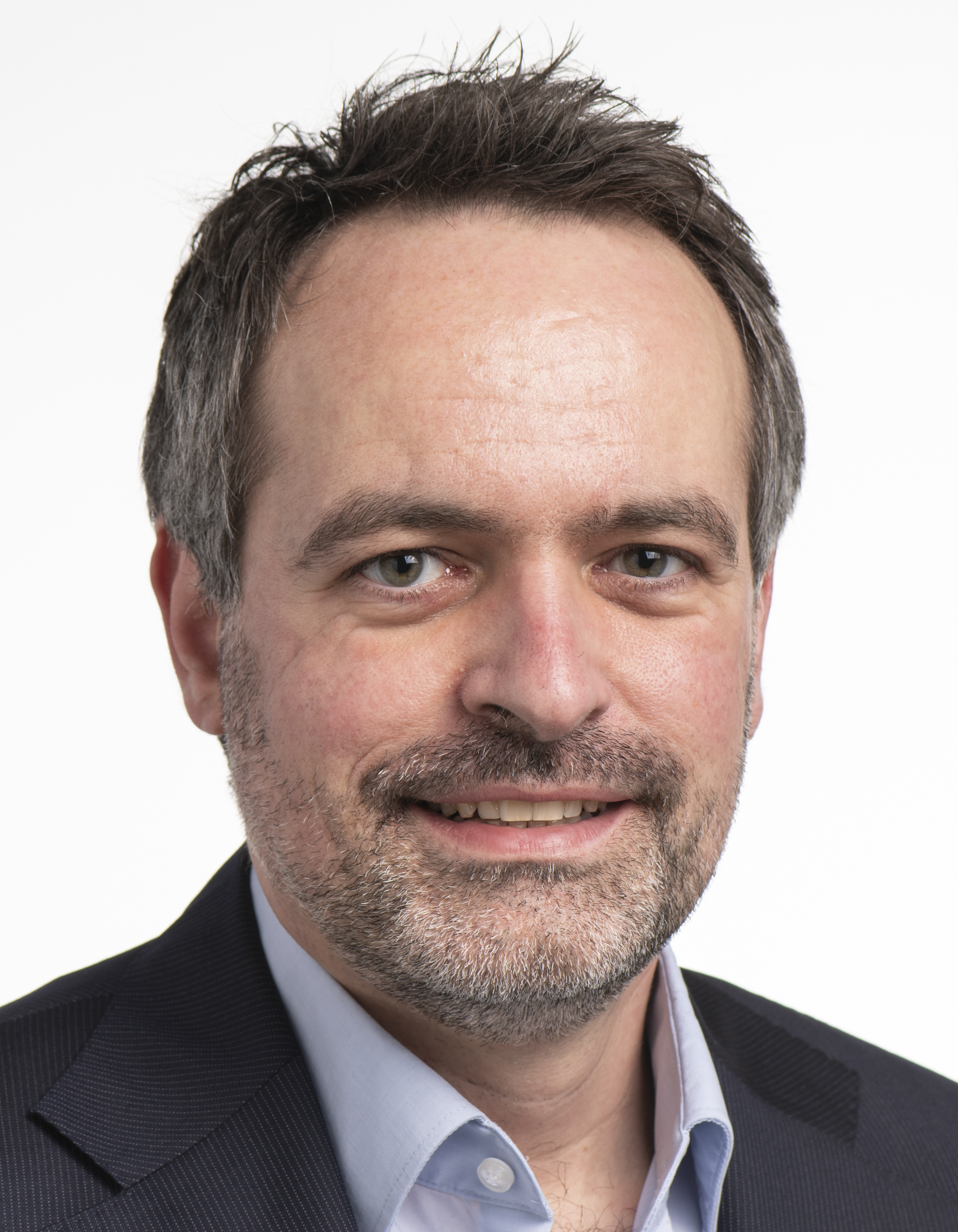

Member of the European Parliament
- Incumbent
- Assumed office 2 February 2022
- Preceded by: Evelyne Gebhardt
- Constituency: Germany

Personal details
- Born: 8 November 1979 (age 46) Karlsruhe, Baden-Württemberg, Germany
- Party: German: Social Democratic Party; EU: Party of European Socialists
- Education: Heidelberg University, University of Montpellier

René Repasi (born 8 November 1979) is a German politician from Social Democratic Party of Germany who has been serving as a Member of the European Parliament since 2022.

== Career ==
Prior to entering parliament, Repasi worked as Professor of Public and Private Interests at Erasmus University Rotterdam.

In parliament, Repasi has since been serving on the Committee on the Internal Market and Consumer Protection. In this capacity, he is the parliament’s rapporteur on the right to repair.

== See also ==
- List of members of the European Parliament for Germany, 2019–2024
