= Caking =

Tendency of powder to form lumps or masses

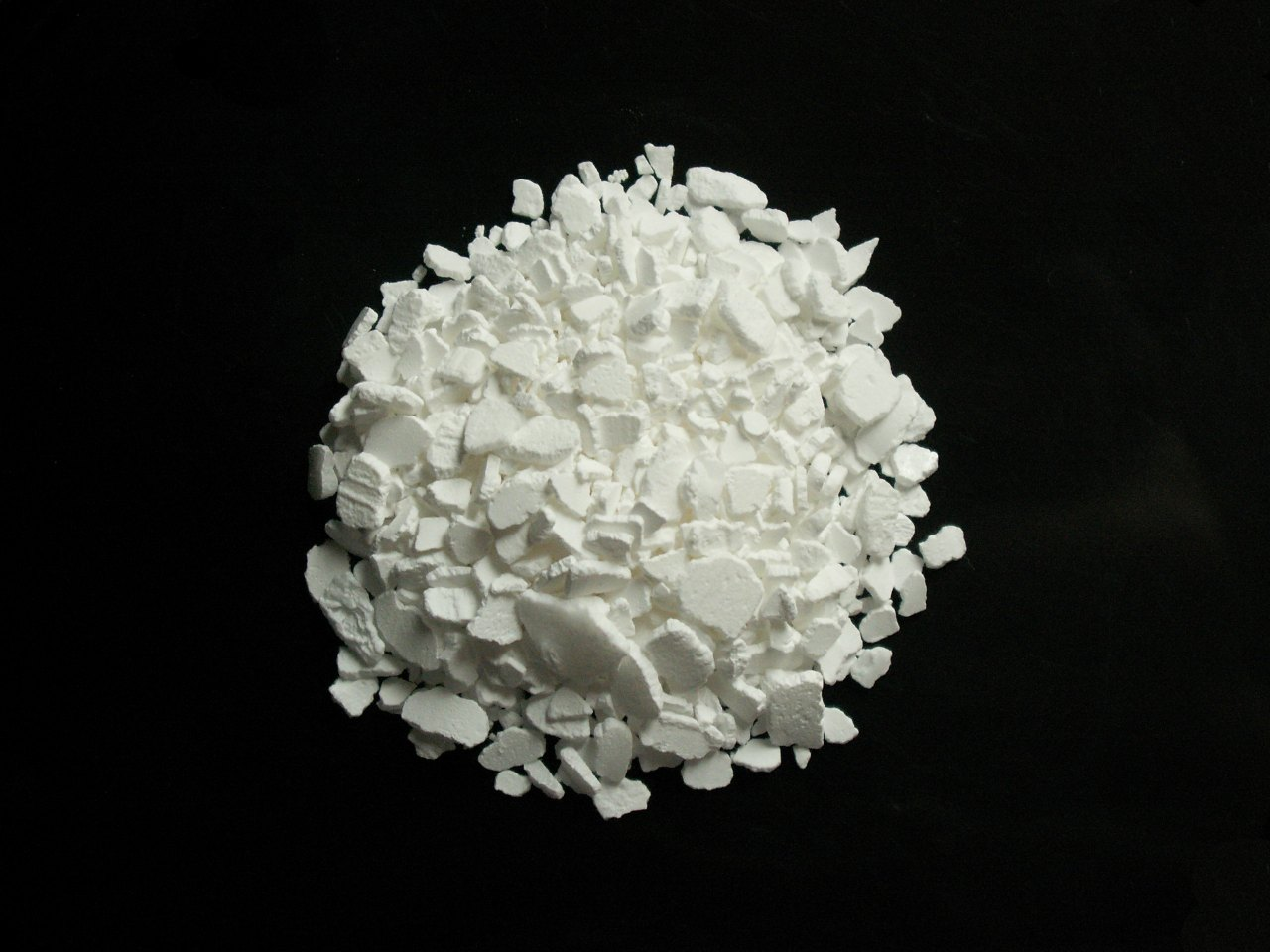
Sample of calcium chloride, showing its tendency to cake.

Caking is a powder's tendency to form lumps or masses. The formation of lumps interferes with packaging, transport, flowability, and consumption. Usually caking is undesirable, but it is useful when pressing powdered substances into pills or briquettes. Granular materials can also be subject to caking, particularly those that are hygroscopic such as salt, sugar, and many chemical fertilizers. Anticaking agents are commonly added to control caking.

Caking properties must be considered when designing and constructing bulk material handling equipment. Powdered substances that need to be stored, and flow smoothly at some time in the future, are often pelletized or made into pills.

== Mechanism ==
Caking mechanisms depend on the nature of the material. Caking is a consequence of chemical reactions of grain surfaces. Often these reactions involve adsorption of water vapor or other gases. Crystalline solids often cake by formation of liquid bridge between microcrystals and subsequent fusion of a solid bridge. Amorphous materials can cake by glass transitions and changes in viscosity. Polymorphic phase transitions can also induce caking. The caking process can involve electrostatic attractions or the formation of weak chemical bonds between particles.

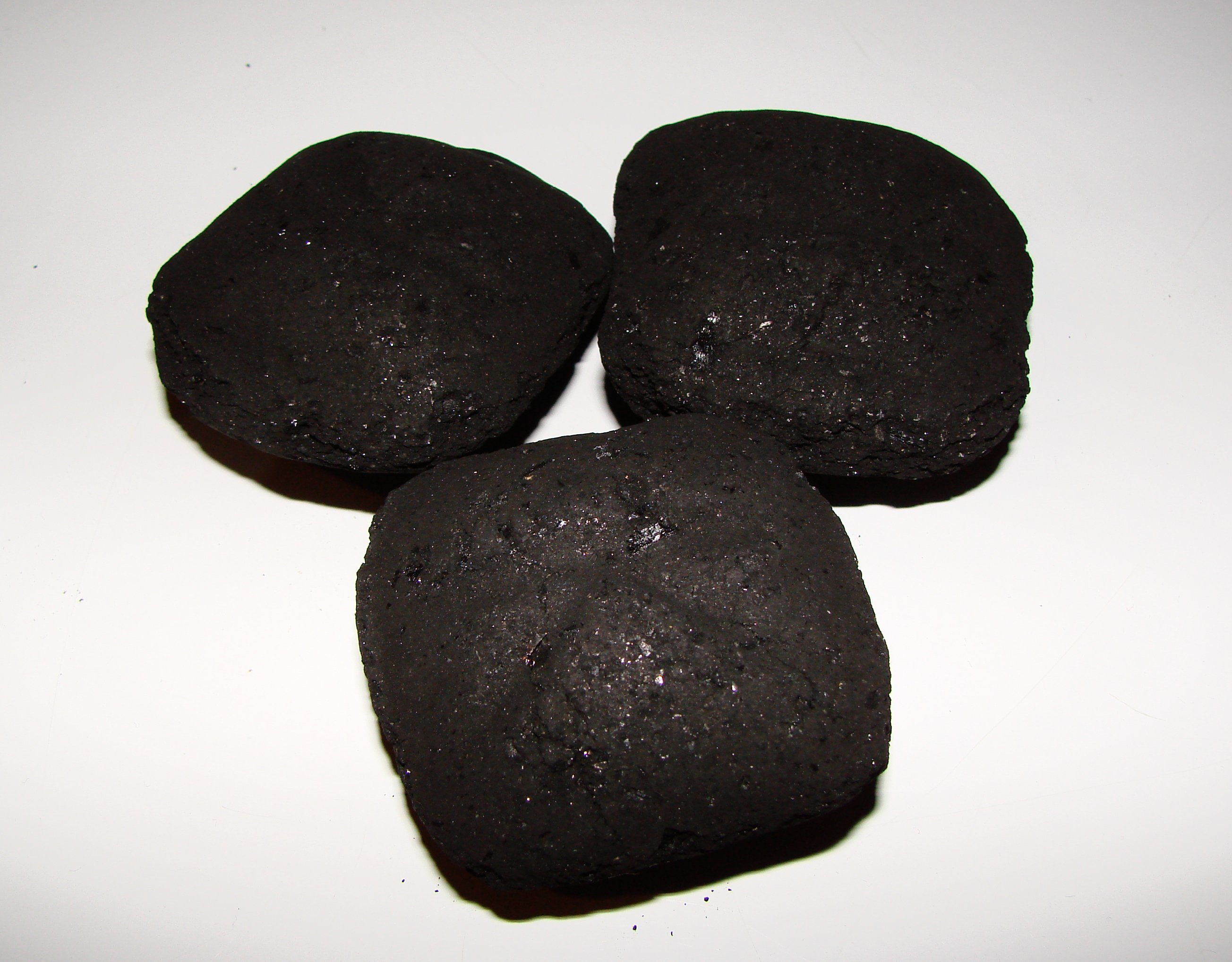
The tendency of charcoal to cake is exploited in producing briquettes, which are more conveniently handled than loose charcoal.

== Anticaking agents ==
Anticaking agents are chemical compounds that prevent caking. Some anticaking agents function by absorbing excess moisture or by coating particles and making them water-repellent. Calcium silicate (CaSiO_{3}), a common anti-caking agent added to table salt, absorbs both water and oil. Anticaking agents are also used in non-food items such as road salt, fertilisers, cosmetics, synthetic detergents, and in manufacturing applications.
