= Fort Pitt Boulevard =

Street in downtown Pittsburgh, Pennsylvania

Coordinates: 40.43703°N 80.00238°W

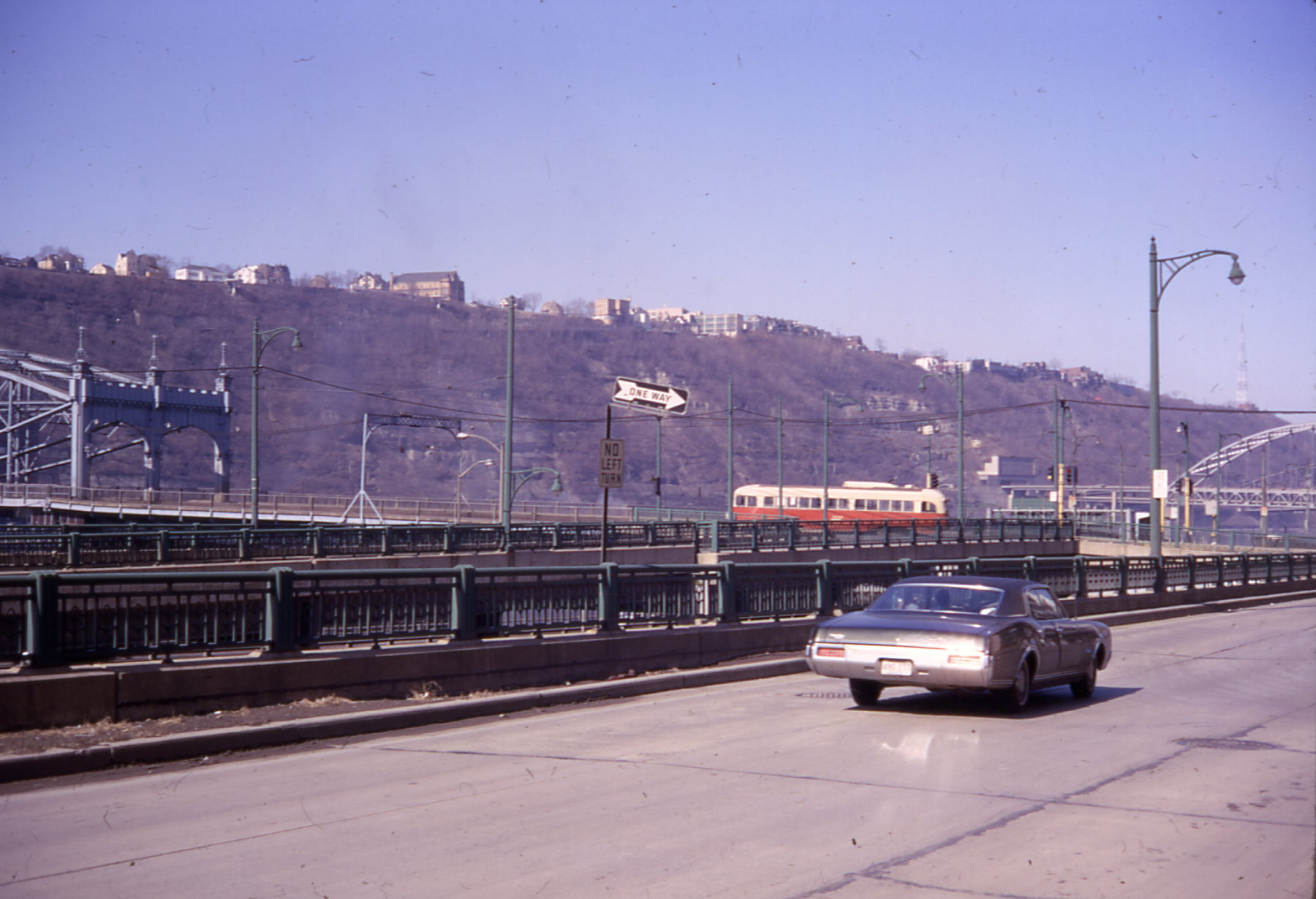
- Historic image showing 1640 Smithfield Street at Fort Pitt Boulevard.
- Interactive map of Fort Pitt Boulevard
- Length: 0.5 mi (0.80 km)
- Location: Pittsburgh, Pennsylvania, United States
- West end: I-376 / US 22 / US 30 / Commonwealth Place in Downtown
- Major junctions: Stanwix Street in Downtown
- East end: I-376 / US 22 / US 30 / Grant Street in Downtown
- North: Boulevard of the Allies

Fort Pitt Boulevard is a road in Pittsburgh on the southern area of Downtown, connecting Fort Pitt Bridge and Interstate 376. Fort Pitt poses a particular challenge to both mapmaker and navigator—along its entire half-mile length, up to six separate roadways making up the Boulevard, the Penn-Lincoln Parkway, and ramps between the latter and various Downtown streets are woven together in a space less than 300 feet wide.

Prior to 1940, the road was known as Water Street. In 1806, it was the home of industrialist James O'Hara; from 1840 to 1935 it was the site of Monongahela House, a hotel which played host to visitors such as Abraham Lincoln and Mark Twain. Of all the businesses that were established along the road prior to the name change, the only ones still in business are Heyl & Patterson Inc., W.W. Patterson Manufacturing and Graybar Electric Company.
