= Heyl & Patterson Inc. =

Heyl & Patterson Equipment
- Type: Headquarters
- Industry: Industrial machinery
- Founded: 1887
- Headquarters: Pittsburgh, Pennsylvania, U.S.
- Area served: North America, South America, Australia, Europe, Asia, Africa
- Key people: Len Walnoha, Vice President Brian Steffan, Sales Director
- Products: Rotary Railcar Dumpers, Barge Unloaders, Fluid Bed Dryers, Rotary Dryers, Calciners, Torrefaction Equipment
- Number of employees: 60
- Website: http://www.heylpatterson.com

Heyl & Patterson Equipment is an American specialist engineering company, founded in 1887 and based in Pittsburgh, Pennsylvania.

== History ==
=== 19th century ===
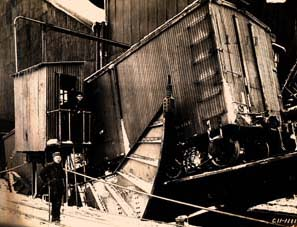
Railcar Dumper, Circa 1900

Heyl & Patterson was founded by Edmund W. Heyl and William J. Patterson in Downtown Pittsburgh, initially as a sales agency for elevator and conveyor chains and elevator buckets. This developed into supplying complete elevators and conveyors. Because it was located in the Coal Region of southwestern Pennsylvania, it was only natural to branch out into the coal industry.

In 1891, Heyl & Patterson engineered its first coal breaker, upstate in Bradford, Pennsylvania. By the end of the 19th century, Heyl & Patterson had set the industry standard for engineering and manufacturing bulk material handling equipment, such as coal tipples, coal preparation plants, pig iron casting machines and various coal cleaning and handling devices. The company was originally composed of contracting engineers, fabricators and erectors. The industries in the company's initial customer base were not only various types of coal plants, but also cement, chemical, steel, glass, blast furnaces, copper mines, ports, foundries, railroads, shipyards and public utilities.

Heyl & Patterson's original place of business was a three-story building on Third Avenue in Pittsburgh. In 1894, Heyl & Patterson relocated to Market Street, but had outgrown that building by 1899 and moved to the Monongahela riverside avenue of Water Street (now called Fort Pitt Boulevard).

Heyl & Patterson gained some notoriety in its early days through Patterson's marriage to Broadway star Fay Templeton, known for her performances in Gilbert and Sullivan productions.

=== Early 20th century ===
In the early 20th century, growth of the business and the extension of activities into new fields caused the need for increased space for machine and structural shops. In 1901, Heyl & Patterson acquired land for a manufacturing plant on Pennsylvania Avenue along the Ohio River in Allegheny City, now known as Pittsburgh's North Side. All machine work and fabrication was done at this North Works facility before materials were shipped out to construction site crews.

In 1904, Heyl & Patterson pioneered the first cranes to lift entire railroad cars, as well as towers to unload barges filled with ore, coal, sand, and slag. 1905 saw the introduction of coal crushers, coke preparation plants, coal handling bridges and mine car dumpers. 1908 saw the first skip hoists and ore bridges to transfer material at steel mills.

In 1924, Heyl & Patterson innovated what would become a staple of the industry - the railroad car dumper.

In 1942, Heyl & Patterson received the U.S. Navy "E" Award for excellence in production achievement, for duties performed during World War II. It was only the sixth recipient since 1900.

By 1950, Heyl & Patterson installations could be found in almost every industrial section of the United States and Canada, as well as South America, Europe, Asia and Australia. Though still concentrating in the field of heavy bulk material handling equipment, Heyl & Patterson initiated a diversification policy and added other products to complement its main activities. These products included several that were developed in the company's own research and development department and still others that were handled in the United States for one of Europe's leading engineering firms. As part of its diversification, Heyl & Patterson divided into two business units. The Bulk Transfer Division was formed to design, fabricate, erect, and service the machines that Heyl & Patterson had developed for the bulk material handling industry, as well as more recent product lines such as stackers, reclaimers, belt conveyors, refuse disposal cars and giant loaders for seafaring ships. The Process Division was formed to innovate fluid bed dryer technology to clean and classify coal at coal preparation plants.

=== Late 20th century ===
By 1960, the area around Water Street had been acquired by the city via eminent domain to build the Westinghouse Building, and this necessitated an eventual move to Parkway Center in the Pittsburgh suburb of Greentree, as the very first tenant. Heyl & Patterson participated in a high-profile project for the Public Auditorium Authority of Pittsburgh - the Civic Arena. Applying technology normally used for ore bridges and other bulk material handling machines, Heyl & Patterson designed and manufactured the trucks, gear motors and 480-volt AC motor drive that opened and closed the arena roof. A total of 42 trucks mounted on 78 wheels, 30 of which were individually driven, supported and moved the six moveable sections on the largest stainless steel dome in the world. In 1961, Heyl & Patterson opened its Florida Operations Division with an office and fabrication plant on Merritt Island near Cocoa Beach, Florida, at the entrance to Kennedy Space Center. Florida Operations would serve the aerospace community at Cape Canaveral, and developed a system of blast deflectors for the space program launch pads. Later in the decade, Heyl & Patterson opened a Service Center in Charleston, West Virginia as a warehouse to stock spare parts.

Heyl & Patterson's North Side manufacturing plant closed in 1970, and was eventually sold to Schneider, Inc., a pipe and sheet metal fabricator. At least two of the buildings still stand, occupied by a furniture warehouse and a bus garage. The Florida Operations Division saw a decline in profits in the 1970s, following the end of the NASA Apollo Program. Attempts were made to expand the scope of its business through maintenance and construction work at the U.S. Navy's Caribbean bases, non-naval construction among the islands and Central America and construction on Merritt Island and at local power plants. It served as the field headquarters for projects in Guantanamo Bay Naval Base in Cuba, the Panama Canal Zone and the Bahamas, but was eventually sold off in 1980. As recently as 2006, a Heyl & Patterson sign still stood on the property.

In 1985, Heyl & Patterson acquired Edw. Renneburg & Sons Co. of Baltimore, Maryland, a leading designer and manufacturer of energy-saving process equipment since 1874. Renneburg & Sons merged with Heyl & Patterson's Process Division to become the Renneburg Division, and the acquisition broadened Heyl & Patterson's scope of fluid bed equipment and rotary dryers, and enabled it to manufacture equipment to process chemicals, pharmaceuticals, fertilizer, metals, fish meal and food. A pilot plant testing lab facility was built in a different Greentree location, similar to one run by Renneburg, to support the new product lines.

=== 21st Century ===
By the start of the 21st century, Heyl & Patterson entered its third century of business, and was now located in the Southpointe business park in nearby Canonsburg, Pennsylvania. In 2007, the company moved to the Pittsburgh suburb of Robinson Township and then to closer to Pittsburgh, in Carnegie, PA, for its final years. The company still designs and manufactures barge unloaders, rail car dumpers, ship unloaders and other material transfer equipment, as well as engineering services and environmental processing equipment, including dryers, coolers and mixers. The company has partners and representatives all over the world, including Mexico, Argentina, Brazil, Chile, India, South Korea and Australia. As of 2010, five of the top six coal-fired power plants in the world rely on equipment from Heyl & Patterson.

In 2012, Heyl & Patterson celebrated its 125th anniversary in business.

In December 2016, the Carrier Process Equipment Group (CPEG), a joint venture of Carrier Vibrating Equipment Inc. and S. Howes LLC purchased Heyl & Patterson's Renneburg Division for thermal processing. The Bulk Transfer division was purchased by Hall Industries, and now operates as Heyl & Patterson Equipment. The Heyl & Patterson Equipment headquarters is located in Canonsburg, Pennsylvania, with manufacturing facilities in Ellwood City & Grove City, Pennsylvania.

== Heyl & Patterson Divisions ==
=== Bulk Transfer Division ===
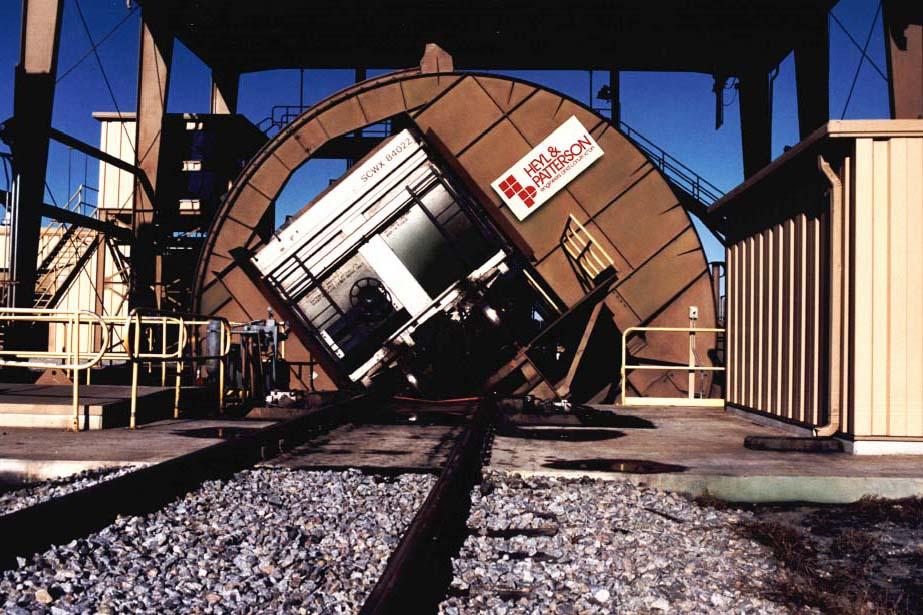
Rotary Railcar Dumper

Heyl & Patterson Equipment designs and manufactures variations of rotary railcar dumpers, or "wagon tipplers," which are in operation worldwide. These include rotary dumpers, C-shaped rotary (CR) dumpers, closed and open-sided turnover dumpers, and single and multiple car dumpers. They also design and manufacture rail car moving devices such as train positioners, train indexing equipment, CUB and other support equipment. Bulk Transfer also offers material handling equipment such as barge unloaders with both grab and continuous bucket designs, and related specialty machinery.

=== Renneburg Division ===
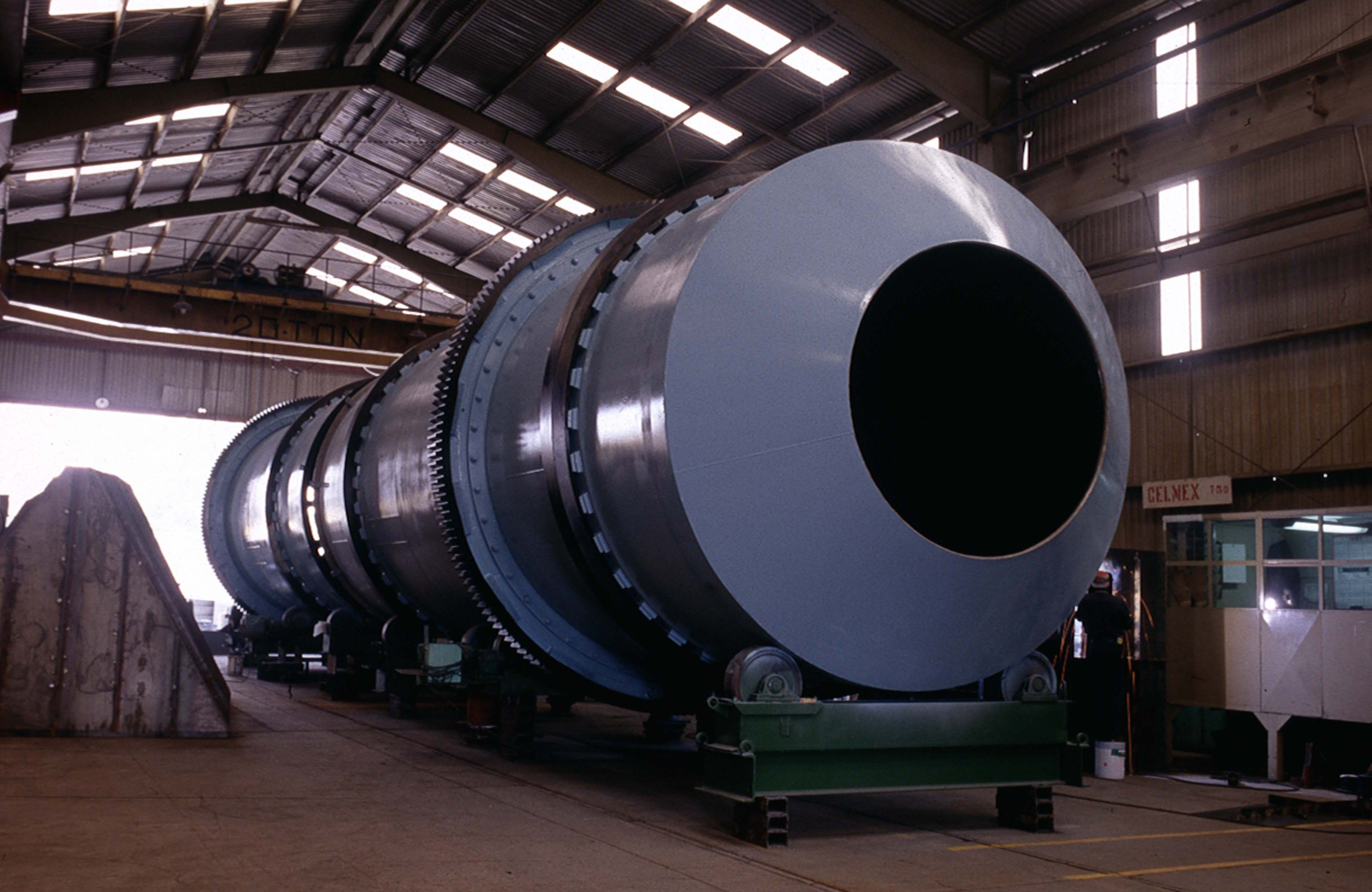
Renneburg Rotary Dryer

Originally formed as the Process Division in 1955, it was renamed after the acquisition of Edw. Renneburg & Sons Co. of Baltimore, Maryland in 1985. Renneburg & Sons was founded in 1874, and was a world leader in process equipment. The Renneburg Division handles thermal processing of powders and bulk solids, as well as advanced chemical, mineral and environmental processing equipment, including fluid bed dryers and coolers, rotary dryers and coolers, calciners, agglomerators, presses and mixers. The division produces thermal processing technology that is environmentally sensitive and production-minded, tailored to the needs of the powder and bulk solids, chemical, and mineral thermal processing industries.

=== Aftermarket Division ===
Originally a separate entity known as HeylPat Technologies since 1996, the Aftermarket Division was consolidated into Heyl & Patterson in 2009. This division offers replacement parts and upgrades for both of the other divisions, whether products had been manufactured by Heyl & Patterson or other manufacturers. Their field engineers provide onsite mechanical, structural and electrical inspections, and complete engineering studies after an inspection can compare current operating realities with the original design of the equipment.

== DryFining ==
In 2010, Heyl & Patterson was part of a team to be awarded with Power Engineering magazine’s 2010 Coal-Fired Project of the Year. The project, “DryFining,” created a new technology for coal-firing power plants that improves fuel quality, decreases volatile gas emissions, and reduces a plant’s operating expenses and maintenance costs. The team was led by electric service provider Great River Energy of Maple Grove, Minnesota, and also included the U.S. Department of Energy’s National Energy Technology Laboratory, Lehigh University’s Energy Research Center, the Electric Power Research Institute and engineering construction contractor WorleyParsons.
