= Polish plumber =

Stereotype of Eastern Europeans

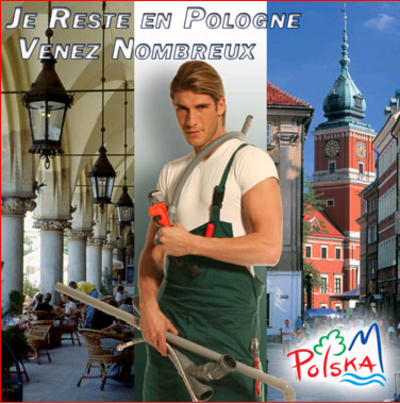
Polish tourism poster featuring a Polish plumber. Caption: "I remain in Poland, do come over en masse."

The Polish plumber and the Polish builder are stereotypes of cheap labour coming from Central and Eastern Europe to work in Western Europe. They are both a symbol of the fear that cheap Eastern European labour is threatening the jobs of Western Europeans and a symbol of foreign labour being more affordable and reliable.

== Origin ==
In 2004, a European Union law known as the Bolkestein Directive was drafted, which aimed at establishing a single market for services in the EU which would allow workers to move freely between countries of the European Union. The term "Polish plumber" was used in an article in Charlie Hebdo in 2004, but became popular after French politician Philippe de Villiers used it while campaigning against the EU law:

Cette affaire est très grave, car la directive Bolkestein permet à un plombier polonais ou à un architecte estonien de proposer ses services en France, au salaire et avec les règles de protection sociale de leur pays d'origine. Sur les 11 millions de personnes actives dans les services, un million d'emplois sont menacés par cette directive. Il s'agit d'un démantèlement de notre modèle économique et social
"This matter is very serious as the Bolkenstein directive permits a Polish plumber or an Estonian architect to offer their services in France at the salary level and with the labor laws of their respective countries of origin. Of the 11 million people engaged in the service industry (in France), one million are threatened by this directive, which seeks to dismantle our economic and social model".

— Philippe de Villiers.

== In politics ==
The Swiss Socialist Party campaigned in favour of the free circulation of people (in the context of European bilateral deals) and also featured a character, with the slogan "Plumbers of all countries, unite!", a reference to the famous slogan from the Communist Manifesto.

An estimated two million workers from Eastern and Central Europe arrived in the United Kingdom between 2003 and 2007, half of them were Polish. The stereotype of the Polish plumber was cited as a factor in the referendum that led to the withdrawal of the United Kingdom from the European Union.

== Poster ==
A Polish tourism board used the stereotype in a humorous poster in 2005 inviting the French to come visit Poland. The designer of the poster was nominated in 2005 for the title "European of the Year" in category "Campaigner of the Year" and the model, Piotr Adamski got his "15 minutes of fame" and a brief career boost.

== See also ==
- Anti-Polish sentiment
- Poles in the United Kingdom
- Poles in France
