= Zeroing (trade) =

Zeroing refers to a controversial methodology used by the United States for calculating antidumping duties against foreign products. The foreign domestic price (FDP) of the product is compared with its U.S. import price (USIP) adjusted for transportation and handling costs. Under zeroing, the United States sets at zero the negative differences (that is whenever FDP minus USIP is less than zero).

Critics of this methodology charge that, because negative amounts are excluded, zeroing results in the calculation of a margin and an antidumping duty in excess of the actual dumping practiced by the countries concerned. The European Union has called for establishment of a World Trade Organization dispute settlement panel to rule on the U.S. practice of zeroing.

A report from the WTO's appellate body condemned this method as unfair. "we are also of the view that a comparison between export price and normal value that does not take fully into account the prices of all comparable export transactions – such as the practice of "zeroing" at issue in this dispute – is not a "fair comparison" between export price and normal value, as required by Article 2.4 and by Article 2.4.2.; (Appellate Body Report, European Communities — Anti-Dumping Duties on Imports of Cotton-Type Bed Linen from India, WT/DS141/AB/R, adopted 12 March 2001).
