= Bolkestein directive =

European Union law aiming at establishing a single market for services

Directive 2006/123/EC
- European Union directive
- Title: Directive on services in the internal market
- Made by: European Parliament & Council
- Made under: Articles 47(2) and 55
- Journal reference: L376, 27 December 2006, pp. 36-68

History
- Date made: 12 December 2006
- Entry into force: 28 December 2006
- Implementation date: 28 December 2009

The Bolkestein directive or Services Directive, officially Services in the Internal Market Directive 2006/123/EC, is a European Union law aiming at establishing a single market for services within the European Union (EU). Drafted under the leadership of the former European Commissioner for Internal Market Frits Bolkestein, it has been popularly referred to by his name. It was seen as an important kick-start to the Lisbon Agenda which, launched in 2000, was an agreed strategy to make the EU "the world's most dynamic and competitive economy" by 2010.

The directive was harshly criticised by left-wing European politicians, trade unions, and citizens who stated that it would lead to competition between workers in different parts of Europe – hence the expression "Polish plumber" – resulting in social dumping. After the 2004 original draft had been substantially amended, the proposal was approved on 12 December 2006 by the European Parliament and Council, and adopted as the Directive 2006/123/EC. The directive has been criticised by right-wing politicians in some member states because in their opinion it has led to uncontrollable migration into their countries.

== History ==
=== 2004 original proposal: the three pillars ===
Devised by the European Commission in March 2004, the first draft of the Services Directive propounded several important changes in the EU services market. Assuming every piece of regulation to be burdensome by default, the Directive required member states to justify all existing legislation on the grounds that it was non-discriminatory, necessary and proportional; however, the changes proposed in the Directive would have not affected the professions, to which the rules of the country where the services are provided would continue to apply under the Directive on the Recognition of Diplomas. Nor, contrary to the popular belief that, for example, a Polish plumber could work in France under Polish labour law), would the changes have affected social legislation or health and safety at work (HSW). In these social fields the Posting-of-Workers Directive requires that short-term social protection, such as minimum wages and HSW, is governed by the rules of the country where the services are provided (the host country), while long-term benefits, such as pension and unemployment benefit contributions, remain with the country of origin (to which the posted workers returns after the service is over).

=== Pros and cons ===
==== Arguments in favour of the original version ====
Legally the Directive did not bring anything into EU law that was not already in the EC Treaty as interpreted by the Court of Justice. The "country of origin" principle had been gradually introduced into EU law on the freedom of movement of goods in the Cassis de Dijon case (1979) and into other areas, notably services and establishment, soon after. Secondary legislation cannot introduce rights and obligations that do not already have a basis in the Treaty. In this respect, the original draft of the Services Directive was not a novelty, but a clarification of the case law of the European Court of Justice, and a continuation of the "country of origin" principle, which had already been applied in the TV Without Frontiers Directive, the Second Banking Directive, the Third Insurance Directive, the E-Commerce Directive and others.

==== Criticisms of the early draft ====
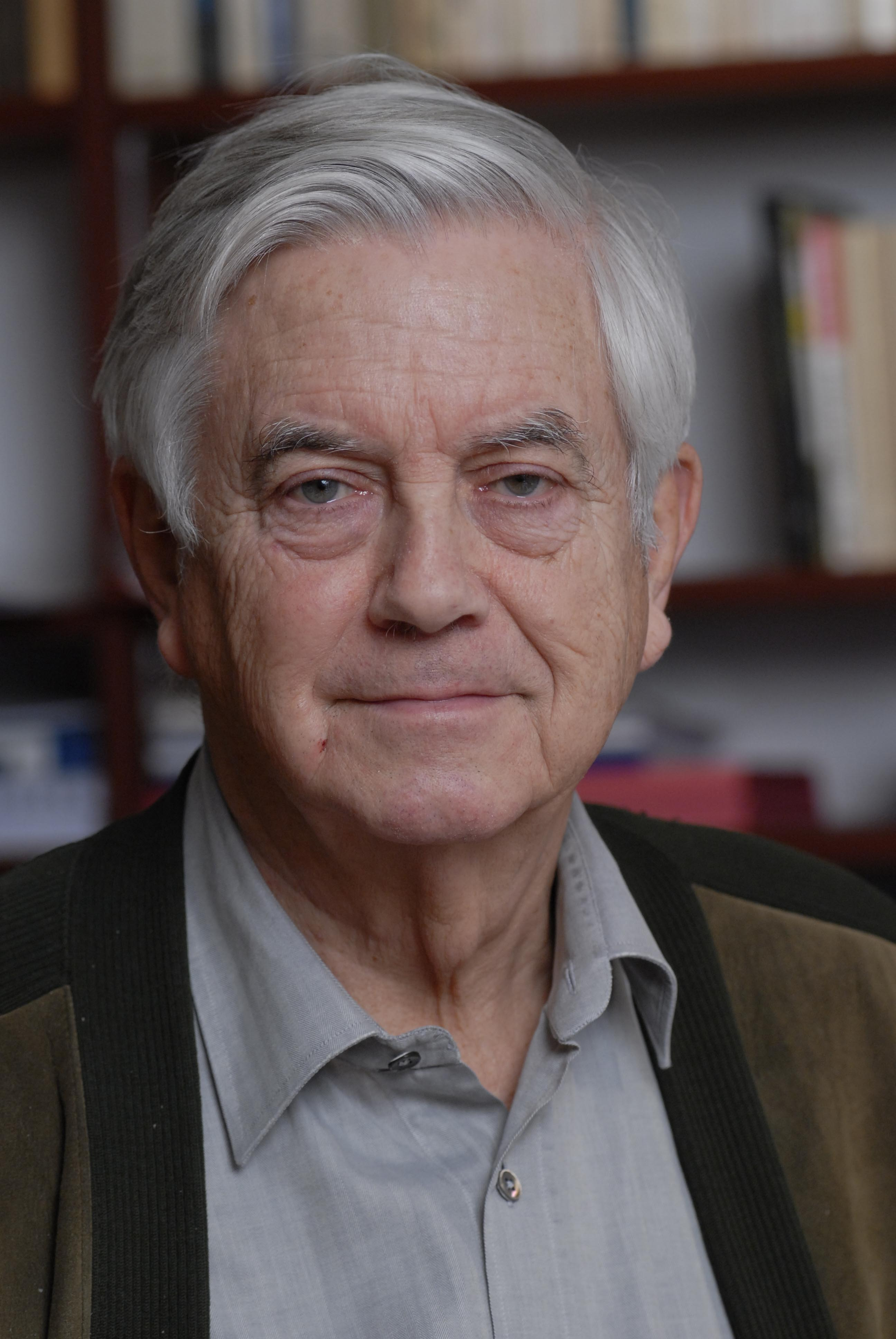
Frits Bolkestein

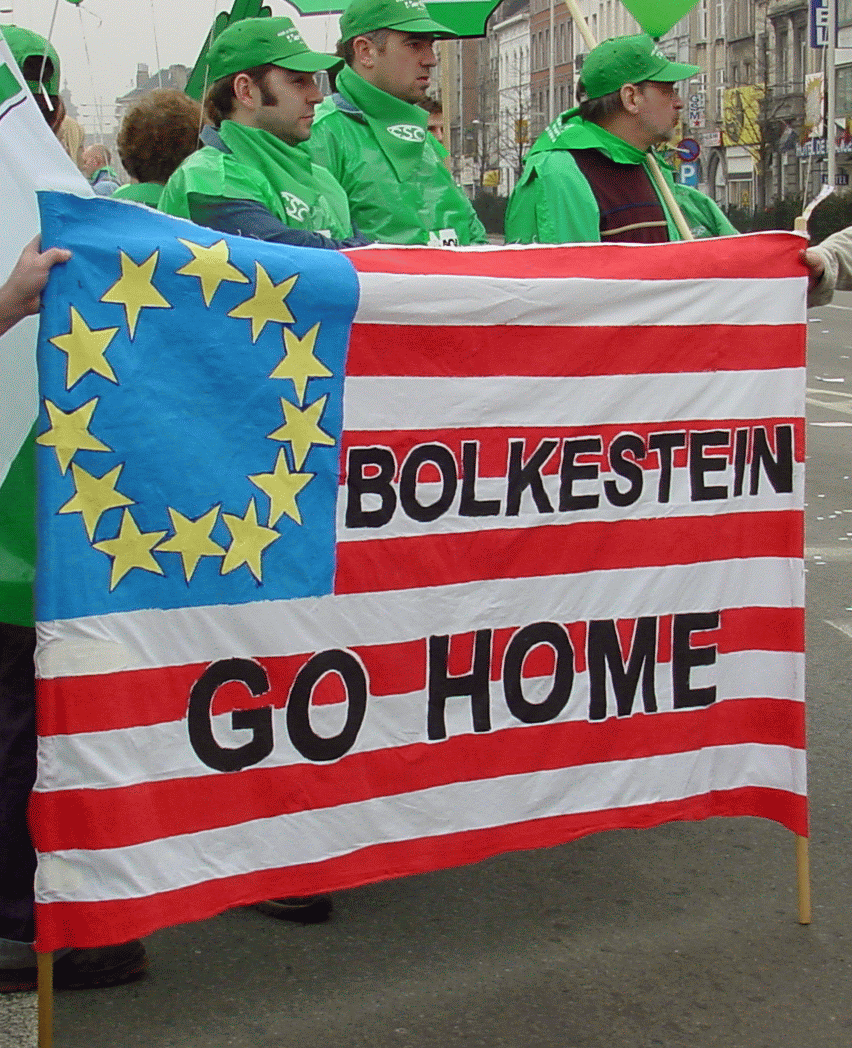
Protest against Frits Bolkestein in Brussels on 19 March 2005

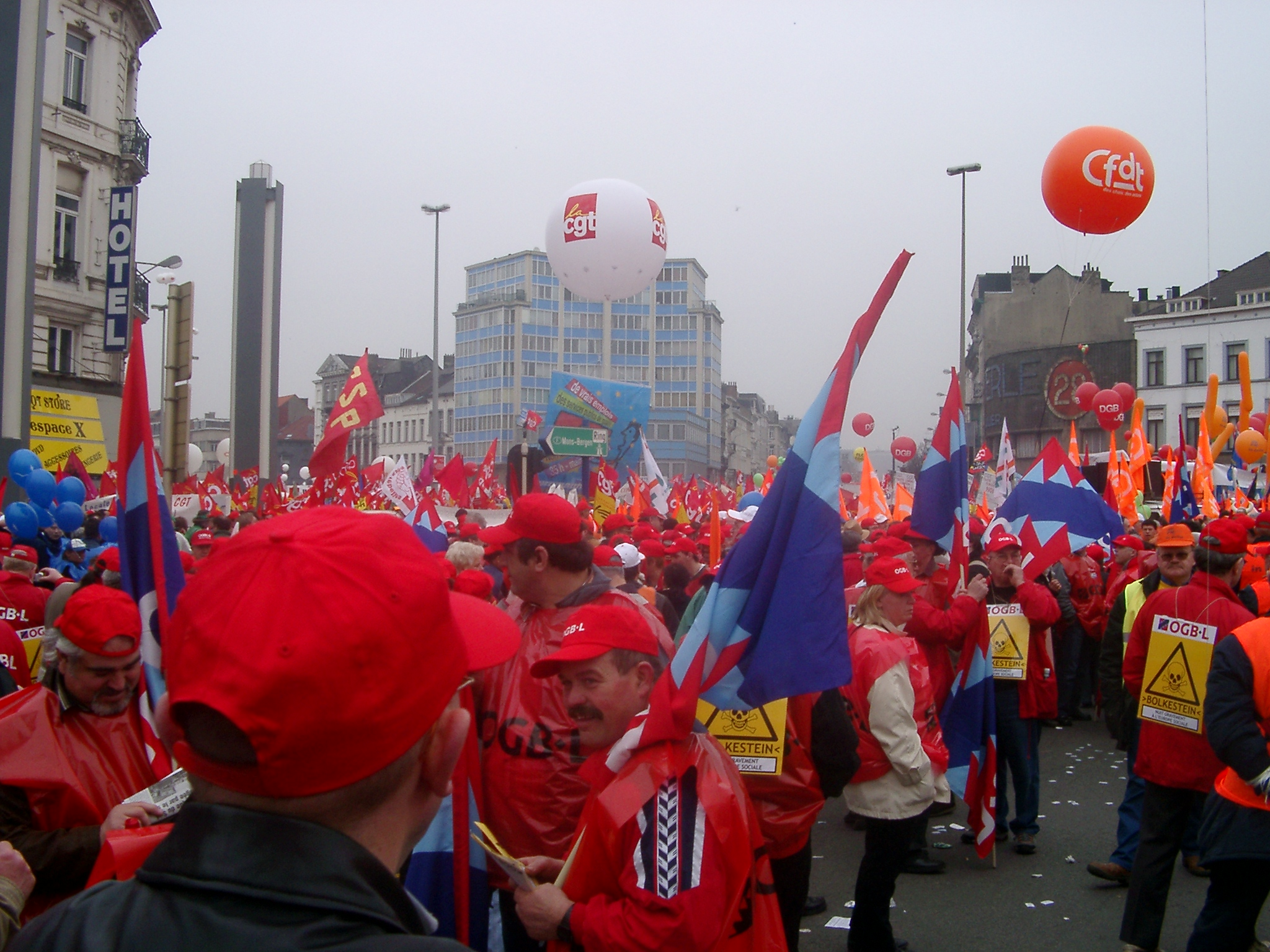
French and Belgian trade unions protesting against the directive in Brussels on 19 March 2005

The first version of the Bolkestein Directive provoked intense debate and mass protests in various EU countries, including France, Belgium, Sweden and Denmark. On 21 March 2005 nearly 100,000 people marched in Brussels to protest against the Directive. Critics argued that the Directive would erode many of the Member States' regulations governing industry and the environment, and would lead to competition between workers in different parts of Europe, resulting in a decline in income levels. The expression "Polish plumber" became famous during the French debate about the Directive, referring to the fear that under the Directive a Polish plumber would be able to work in France under Polish labour laws. Critics also charged that the Directive was a sign that "Anglo-Saxon" economic policy was running rampant over the EU and claimed that the Directive would inevitably lead to "social dumping" as companies and jobs were relocated to the lower-cost and less regulated economies of eastern Europe. They also falsely claimed that the Directive would have an adverse effect on social legislation and HSW when it would have no effect on either.

=== Developments during 2005 ===
On 22 March 2005, EU leaders agreed on a "far reaching" revision of the Directive to preserve the European social model. French President Jacques Chirac told an EU summit in Brussels that the changes planned by the Directive were "unacceptable". Jean-Claude Juncker of Luxembourg declared: "If France wishes to eliminate the risk of social dumping, this will be addressed in the framework of the legislative procedure and of co-decision, which has been initiated." Modifications to the Directive were introduced at a later stage, in the normal course of the EU legislative process. On 1 July 2005, the UK, which was in favour of the Directive, took the chair of the presidency of the Council of the European Union. In Tony Blair's speech to the European Parliament on 23 June he committed the UK Presidency to try to "resolve some of the hard dossiers," of which the Services Directive was one; however, agreement was not achieved during its presidency.

=== Parliamentary amendments to the original version ===
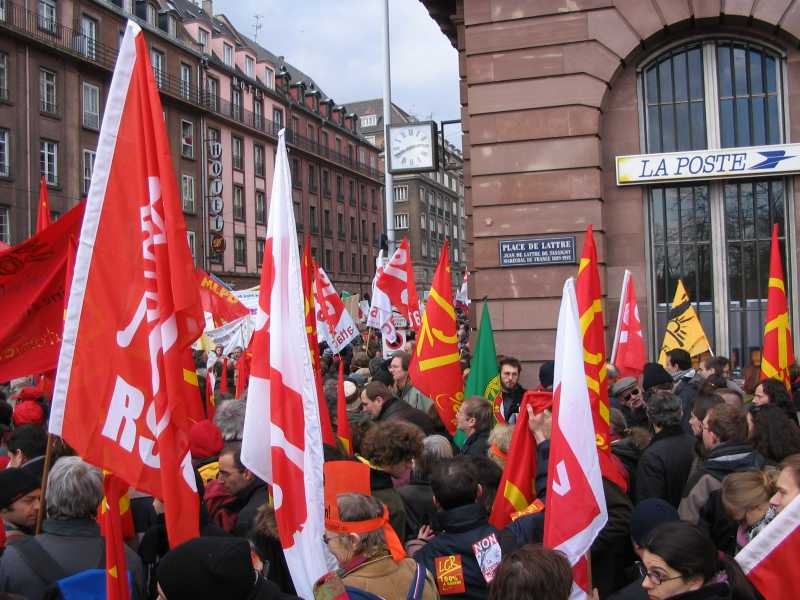
Protests against the directive in Strasbourg on 12 February 2006

From 14 to 16 February 2006 a plenary session of the European Parliament carried out its first reading of the Directive in Strasbourg. On 16 February 2006 MEPs (Members of the European Parliament) voted 391–213 in favour of a proposed revision to the Directive, although it had already been "watered down" from the original version read to the European Parliament on 14 February, so much so that Socialist MEP Evelyne Gebhardt said that the Directive had been "turned upside down," a claim contested by labour organisations. The majority of members of the two largest groupings in the Parliament, the conservative European People's Party (EPP) and the centre-left Party of European Socialists (PES), voted in favour of the revised draft. The Party of the European Left, the European Green Party, and the French Socialist Party voted against the new revision. Meanwhile, about 50,000 people demonstrated against the "country of origin principle" in Strasbourg.

==== Suggested inclusions ====
The proposed Directive would have covered:

- Services of "general public interest" (public services), including, but not limited to, water, sewage and waste management.
- Services provided to businesses, such as management consultancy, certification and testing, facilities management and advertising,
- Services provided both to businesses and to consumers, such as real estate agencies, construction services, architects, distribution services, car rental and travel agencies.
- Consumer leisure services such as tourism, sports centres and amusement parks.

==== Suggested exclusions ====
The following would have been excluded:

- Broadcasting,
- Gambling
- Temporary employment agencies,
- Legal and social services,
- Postal and Audiovisual services,
- Public health care (but not private health care),
- Public transport

The controversial "country of origin" principle was explicitly left out, but there was no "country of destination" principle to replace it. The European Court of Justice would therefore be charged with deciding, through its jurisprudence, which country's labour laws would apply in each case.

=== Comments on the amended draft ===
==== Proponents of liberalisation ====
Business groups stated that the new Directive would limit the benefits that the early version of the Directive would have provided. The European Commission estimated that this proposed version of the Directive would have created an additional 600,000 jobs in the EU, would have boosted economic growth, and would have increased product quality and choice for consumers. The Wall Street Journal estimated that the revised Directive would have failed in its objective: the liberalisation of services at the heart of the EU. D. Godefridi of the Hayek Institute wrote in le Figaro: "Services represent 70% of the European economy. In not liberalising these the EU remains below the objective of the founding treaties of 1957: there is no common European market. For ten years European economic project has moved backwards. On 30 May 2006 the European political elite buried the very essence of the European project."

==== Opponents of liberalisation ====
Left-wing and labour organisations maintained that the new version of the Directive was not as favourable to workers as it was made out to be. There was also concern that the "country of origin" principle would most likely still be applied by the European Court of Justice, as previous jurisprudence seemed to suggest. In particular, it was pointed out that member states would be prohibited from applying any kind of restricted authorisation to businesses in the fields covered by the Directive, which would, they claimed, make administration of labour laws close to impossible.

=== Final revision ===
On 5 April 2006, the European Commission presented a new version of the Directive to the Council of Ministers, including most of the modifications voted by the MEPs, in accordance with the codecision procedure. On 29 May 2006 the Council approved the revised text, which subsequently was resubmitted to the Parliament for its second and final reading.

== Approval and implementation ==
The Directive, after being substantially amended from the original proposal, was adopted on 12 December 2006 by the Council and the European Parliament, and published on the Official Journal of the European Union on 27 December 2006 as the Directive 2006/123/EC. Therefore, the Directive on services in the internal market should have been completely implemented by the Member States by 28 December 2009. Although the final version did not include the "country of origin" principle, the Directive instead reminded Member States of the principle of free movement, while accepting inroads when free movement collides with other public interests; however, before making such inroads, authorities have to verify and recognize any protection already provided in the country of origin. Under the mutual recognition principle, they need to take into account what takes place in other countries before proceeding.

=== Implementation ===
The Services Directive, which came into force on 28 December 2009, requires all EU Member States to establish web portals so that anyone who provides a service will have a "point of single contact" where they can find out what legal requirements they need to meet to operate in the country in question. Service providers can also use the web portals to apply for any licence or permit they need. The Directive aimed to make it easier for EU service providers to operate in any other EU Member State. The UK's Department for Business, Innovation and Skills (Services Directive implementation team), working with marketing consultants, created the EUGO brand for use on point-of-single-contact portals across Europe. On 17 November 2016, the European Commission identified nine Member States who it claimed had retained restrictive professional practices which did not comply with the directive.

== See also ==
- Four Freedoms (European Union)
- Lisbon Strategy
- Labour law
