= Rotary car dumper =

Mechanism for unloading railroad cars

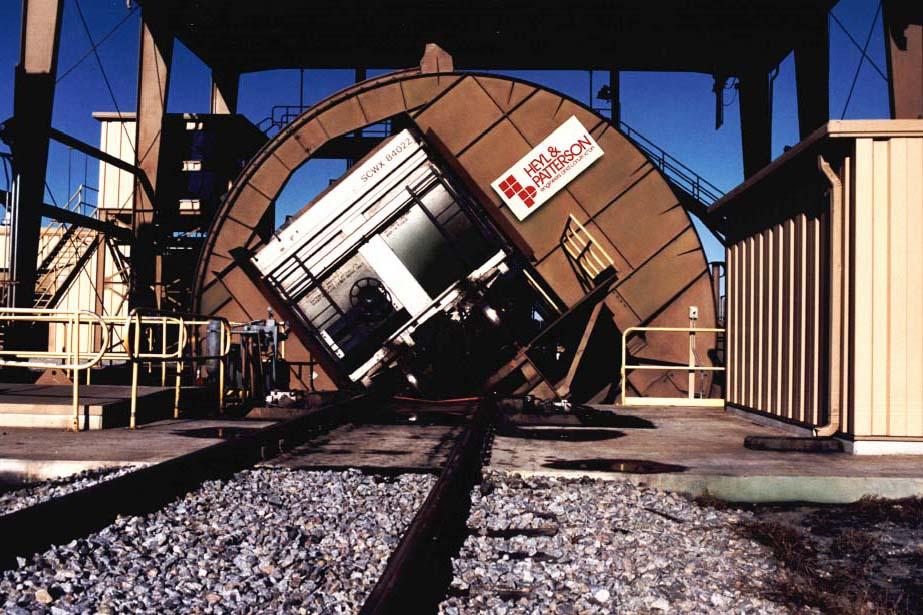
Rotary Railcar Dumper at 45-Degree Rotation

A rotary car dumper or wagon tippler (UK) is a mechanism used for unloading certain railroad cars such as hopper cars, gondolas or mine cars (tipplers, UK). It holds the rail car to a section of track and then rotates the track and car together to dump out the contents. Because hopper cars require sloped chutes in order to direct the contents to the bottom dump doors (hatches) for unloading, gondola cars allow cars to be lower, thus lowering their center of gravity, while carrying the same gross rail load. Cars are equipped with rotary couplers to allow dumping them while they are still coupled; a "Double Rotary" gondola or hopper has rotary couplers on both ends to allow it to be unloaded while it remains coupled to stationary cars at each end.

== History ==
In 1893, Timothy Long filed for a patent on a rotary car dumper. This dumper required the car to be uncoupled because the dumper rolled the car to the side as it dumped. In 1901, Erskine Ramsay filed for a patent on a rotary dumper where the center of rotation of the dumper was aligned with the coupling. When combined with Janney couplers that were free to rotate, this permitted dumping cars without uncoupling them from the train.

The rotary mine-car dumper offered by the Ottumwa Box-Car Loader Company in 1909 could dump five relatively small mine cars per minute. Prior to this, the common method of dumping mine cars was to tip them endwise.

By 1921, the Car Dumper Equipment Company was offering a wide variety of rotary dumpers, including not only standard gauge dumpers, but also dumpers for use on mine railways; some of the latter were designed to dump an entire train in one operation.

== Examples ==
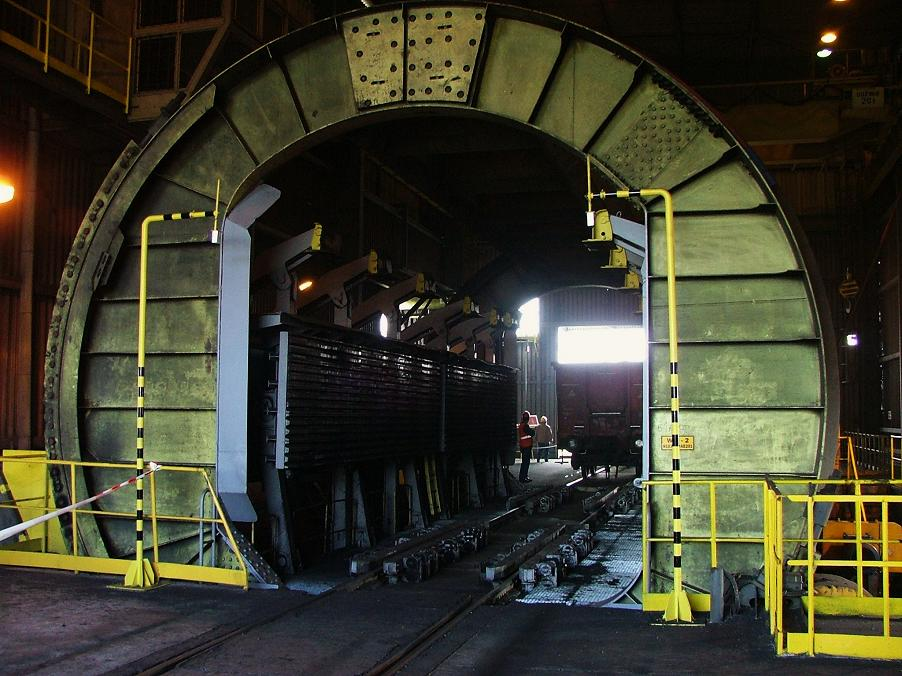
Rotary car dumper in Kraków

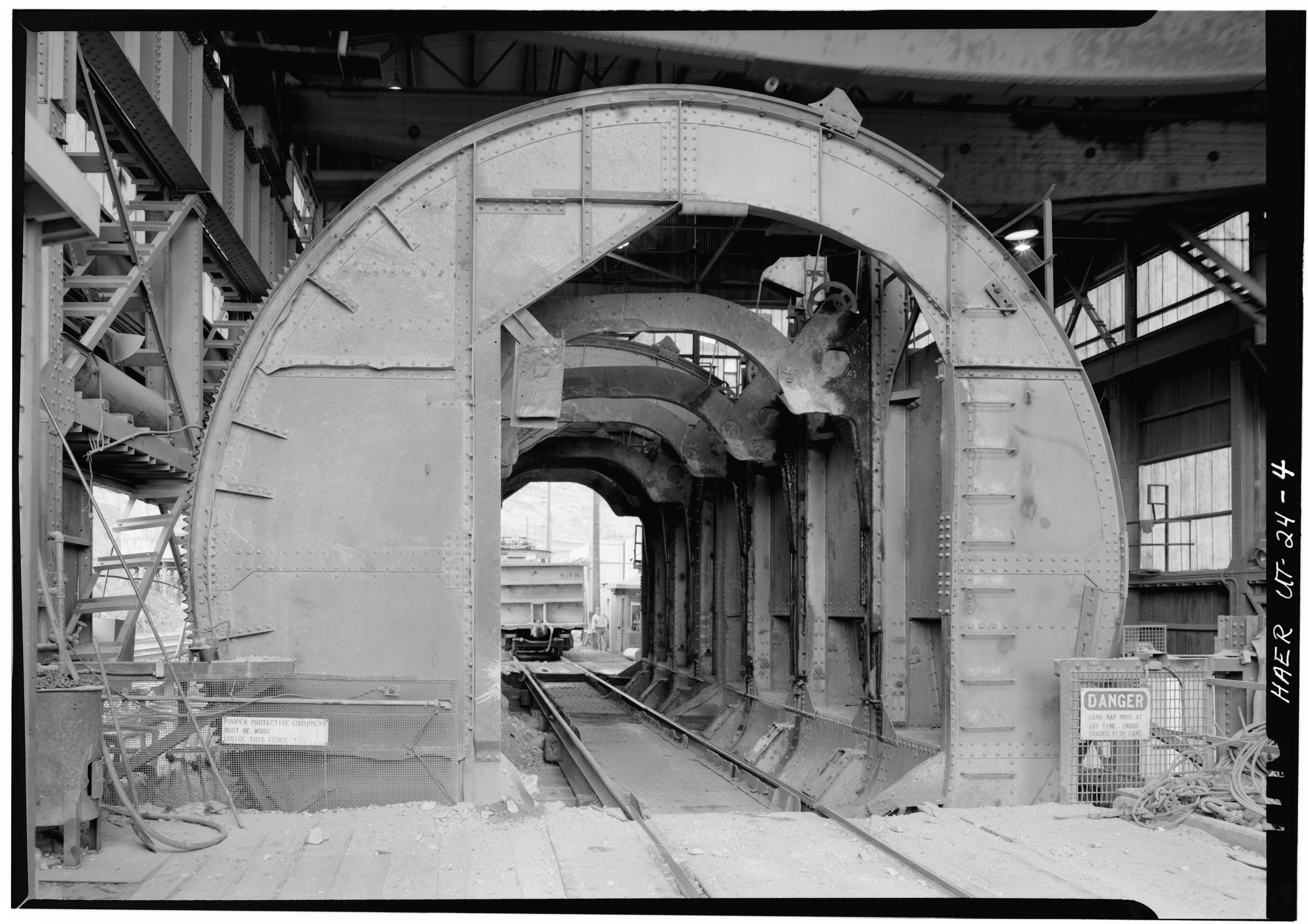
Rotary car dumper of the Utah Copper Company in Utah (1972)

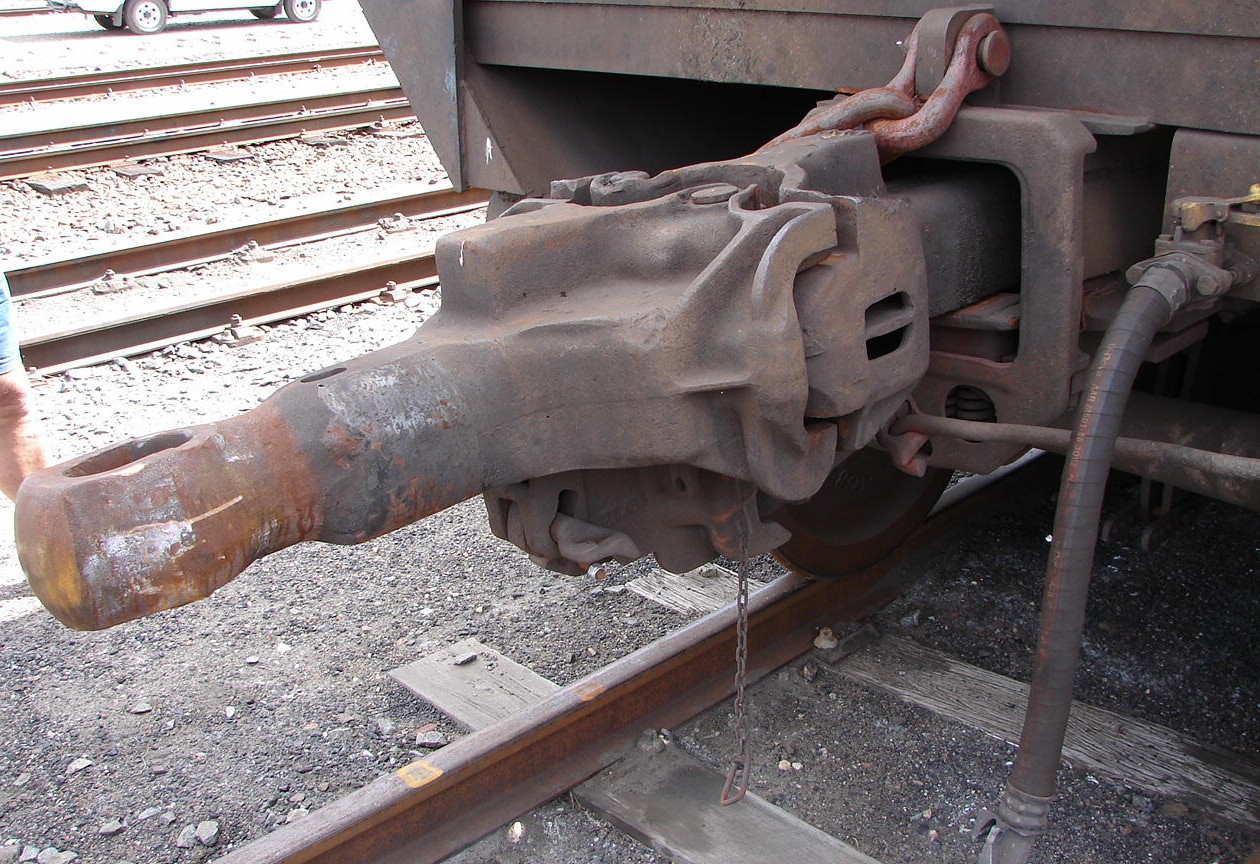
The Type F coupler on the left has lost its pin and was pulled out of its coupler pocket.

== Alternatives ==
The primary alternative to rotary dumping has long been provided by a wide variety of self-unloading cars. Most of these are bottom-dump cars of various sorts, equipped with doors of one sort or another at the bottom to allow bulk cargo to be unloaded by gravity. Drop-bottom gondolas, for example, are low-sided open-topped cars where much of the floor of the car is composed of trapdoors. While drop-bottom cars could usually be used for other purposes, side-dump cars and hopper cars with sloping floors to guide the cargo to unloading doors can only be used for bulk cargo. All of these have the advantage that they can be unloaded anywhere, but the disadvantage that any imperfection in the seals of the doors allows material to spill onto the track.

In the mining industry, the long established standard for dumping mine cars was to run them into horns at the ends of the rails at the tipple. The inertia of the car would cause it and sometimes a short segment of hinged rail to tip forward, dumping the load out the end of the car. Some of these dump mechanisms completely overturned the car end-for-end, and some allowed the car to continue onward after being dumped. In the 19th century, a patent was issued for a machine to tip entire railroad cars endwise for unloading.

Bulk cargo such as grain shipped in boxcars poses particular problems. The Ottumwa Box Car Loader Company built boxcar unloaders that both tipped the car sideways and rocked it end for end so that the cargo would spill out the side door. One of these machines was in use in Portland, Oregon in 1921.

== See also ==
- Bulk cargo
- Bulk material handling
- Heyl & Patterson Inc.
- Metso
- Pilbara Railways in Western Australia for iron ore.
  Mostly two cars at a time.
- Type F coupler
