= Equivalent dumping coefficient =

Mathematical coefficient in civil engineering

An equivalent dumping coefficient is a mathematical coefficient used in the calculation of the energy dispersed when a structure moves. As a civil engineering term, it defines the percent of a cycle of oscillation that is absorbed (converted to heat by friction) for the structure or sub-structure under analysis. Usually it is assumed that the equivalent dumping coefficient is linear, which is to say invariant compare to oscillatory amplitude. Modern seismic studies have shown this not to be a satisfactory assumption for larger civic structures, and have developed sophisticated amplitude and frequency based functions for equivalent dumping coefficient.

When a building moves, the materials it is made from absorb a fraction of the kinetic energy (this is especially true of concrete) due primarily to friction and to viscous or elastomeric resistance which convert motion or kinetic energy to heat.
