= Double dump valve =

Double dump valves, also known as double flap valves or double flap gates, are a type of airlock valve commonly used in industrial applications as a component in bulk material handling applications. Double dump valves are primarily used to discharge chunky or fibrous, bulk materials from hoppers, bins, and cyclones operating under positive or negative pressure. Double dump valves are used to discharge a flow of material while at the same time serving as an airlock transition point to preserve the pressure differential above and below the valve. This type of material handling valve is ideal for use with bulky or abrasive materials that would tend to jam or damage a rotary feeder.

== Operation ==
Double dump valves have two trap-door flap plates which open and close on an alternating cycle. The top gate opens to allow collected material to drop through onto the bottom gate. The top gate then re-closes to prevent air leakage above the valve. The bottom gate then opens to allow material to pass completely through the valve. The bottom gate then re-closes to prevent air leakage below the valve. This cycle is continuously repeated in order to maintain a steady discharge of material from the valve, while maintaining a positive seal on the system.

== Design ==
Timing of the flap plates is critical in order to make sure a double dump valve operates properly. There are several designs that have been employed in order to maintain a consistently operating valve.

== Control systems ==
=== Pneumatic ===
Each flap plate has its own pneumatically operated cylinder and solenoid valve. The timing of the valve is controlled by an electronic signal sent to the solenoid valves. This method of operation is the most expensive and allows for accurate timing of the valve.

=== Counterbalance ===
This type of double dump valve works essentially, like a stacked pair of trickle valves. Each flap plate is held closed with a counterweighted arm. As material builds up on the top plate the weight of the head of material pushes it open where it dumps onto the bottom plate. This type of double dump valve has no electrical or pneumatic controls and is the least expensive method of operation. However, it is difficult to sustain a properly timed cycle.

=== Cam-operated ===
A motor-driven cam rotates and alternately opens the top gate and the bottom plate. A spring attached to the gate’s shaft re-closes the gates. This type of double dump valve is generally the most reliable and can be operated with an electric motor or a pneumatic motor. The speed of the cycle can be selected through the gear reducer ratio or by adjusting the motor speed.
