= SUTA dumping =

Tax avoidance scheme to circumvent unemployment insurance taxes in the US

SUTA dumping is a name commonly used to describe a practice used by some companies doing business in the United States to circumvent paying unemployment insurance taxes, as mandated by the Unemployment Tax Act of 1939. The acronym SUTA is for "State Unemployment Tax."

In all 50 states, each employer is given a variable "experience" or "unemployment insurance" rate, depending on various factors, including worker retention. Some businesses retain the same employees for years and have a low rate, but other industries, such as construction, tend to have high turnover and a corresponding higher rate. New businesses are given a new employer rate, which varies per state (California's, for example, is 3.4%); they stay on that rate for a few years, when they are considered "experience rated."

To avoid higher tax rates, some companies get multiple account numbers with a state unemployment insurance agency and shuffle employees around to the account number with the lowest unemployment insurance rate each year. Another common scheme is to buy a business with a lower unemployment insurance rate and to shuffle employees to the other business to pay the lower tax rate.

President George W. Bush signed the SUTA Dumping Prevention Act on August 9, 2004 to curb the practice.

== Related links ==
- U.S. Department of Labor Advisory on SUTA Dumping
