= Dumped =

British television series

- Official logo for Dumped
- Also known as: Eco-Challenge
- Genre: Reality/Documentary
- Presented by: Rob Holdway
- Narrated by: Tony Gardner
- Theme music composer: James Lundie
- Country of origin: United Kingdom
- No. of seasons: 1
- No. of episodes: 4

Production
- Executive producers: Helen Hawhen; Helen Veale
- Producer: Elaine Arthur
- Production locations: Croydon, London
- Editors: Luca Salvatori; Tim Clack; Craig Nichols; Dan Evans
- Camera setup: Phil Broom; Colin Skinner
- Running time: 1 hour (with advertisement breaks)

Original release
- Network: Channel 4
- Release: 2 September – 5 September 2007

Dumped is a British reality television programme which started on 2 September 2007 and aired nightly until 5 September 2007 on Channel 4. It involved 11 contestants living for three weeks on a rubbish dump next to a landfill site near Croydon in South London. The contestants who "survived" the 21 days and used only what they found on the dump were awarded £20,000 to share equally between them. The working title of the programme was Eco-Challenge. One contestant, Darren Lumsden, voluntarily left the programme on Day 3. The series was promoted with a large publicity campaign, which included advertisements on websites and a concert by the Royal Philharmonic Orchestra. The programme achieved a peak of 2.4 million viewers, although this was marginally less than the number of people watching other channels at the same time. The programme was criticised because it was filmed on an artificial landfill and for its choice of "fame hungry" contestants.

== Production and format ==
Dumped, which was filmed in June 2006, was initially scheduled for Channel 4's Spring 2007 line-up. However, this did not occur and the programme was then postponed until the start the channel's period of "creative renewal", which was established due to the racism controversy that occurred during the fifth series of Celebrity Big Brother in January 2007.

11 participants, who were not initially informed of their task, must live on a purpose-made rubbish dump adjacent to a working landfill site for 21 days after being left equipped only with a sleeping bag, drinking can and one roll of lavatory paper each. Rob Holdway, director of environmental consultancy Giraffe Innovation, presented the programme and set the contestants regular challenges. The participants had to wear Kevlar gloves, protective boots and face masks when working on the real landfill site. Every person working on the programme was given tetanus, polio and hepatitis vaccinations for their safety.

== Contestants ==
The 11 contestants who participated "represented the complete spectrum of public opinion on environmental issues". Potential participants were not told that the programme would involve living on a landfill, but were instead told that they would be part of "a unique eco-challenge". One participant, Darren Lumsden, voluntarily left the programme after just three days, claiming that the experience had taught him nothing, though years later he would turn up on another reality TV show called The Chop (in October 2020).

Name	Age	Occupation	Hometown	Source
Edwin Trudon	20	Psychology student	Devon	
Sasha Gardner	25	Model	Bournemouth	
Sylvia Viosna	27	Sales manager	London	
Ian Nash	23	Marine engineer	Portsmouth	
Selena Lethbridge-Carr	37	Personal trainer	Surrey	
Jarvis Smith	36	Advertising manager	Leicester	
Christine Flynn	47	Designer	Glasgow	
Jason Blair	36	Singer	London	
Lawrence Rimmer	19	Biology student	Derbyshire	
Darren Lumsden	27	Tattooist	Bristol	

== Pre-series publicity ==
Described as Channel 4's "biggest marketing campaigns of the year", Dumped was promoted via various methods. Advertisements for the programme appeared on websites such as Yahoo, The Guardian, New Scientist, The Daily Telegraph and MSN. Television adverts, using the 1998 single "Delta Sun Bottleneck Stomp" by Mercury Rev, featured people performing everyday tasks such as bathing whilst on the landfill. Posters featuring the programme's tagline, "Living off the landfill", were displayed across Britain and others appeared on the London Underground. Some bus shelters within London featured posters which were made out of rubbish, and 2 September 2007 edition of The Sunday Times featured a biodegradable bag wrap to promote the programme. Eight members of the London Philharmonic Orchestra performed Land of Hope and Glory on the landfill site that the programme was filmed, using instruments that had been made out of waste.

== Episode breakdown ==
Episode Number	Timescale	Events	Departures	Viewing Figures
1	Days 1–3	On Day 1, the 11 participants met in a hotel near Gatwick Airport. They were initially told that they were participating in a television programme about man's effect on the environment. As they were all given vaccinations before the start of the programme, provided with "survival kits" and told to bring their passports, many of the group speculated that they will fly abroad from nearby Gatwick Airport. However, they were driven on a bus with tinted windows to a rubbish dump outside Croydon. The group were shocked, and presenter Rob Holdway told them that they were to use a shipping container to provide shelter for the first night only, and would then have to construct their own shelter from the waste products in the dump for use from Day 2 and onwards.; The group continued to build their shelter on Day 2. Rob Holdway arrived at the site with a trailer filled with food. He said that the average British person threw away this amount of food in one year, and that the group had to live on this food for the remainder of the week.; Day 3 saw the group visit the real landfill site, which is located next to the artificial dump that they were staying on.	Darren Lumsden asked to leave the dump, claiming that the experience was not worthwhile.	2.4 million
2	Days 4–7	Day 4 saw the participants become scavengers, as they were able to sell waste products from the dump to Ray, a rag and bone man. Ian held a group meeting about rebuilding the shelter that was constructed on Day 2, and assigns roles to the others. Rob enters the camp to inform the participants that the chemical toilet will be removed from the camp, and that the group will have to make a composting version.; The chemical toilets were removed on Day 5 and Lawrence designed the composting toilet. He held a meeting with the group and organised them into three teams, giving each team instructions on how to build a particular part of the toilet.; Selena was the only person contributing to dump life on Day 6; she was collecting materials for Ray the scrap man's visit the next day. However, Jason was not working due to religious reasons, as it was Shabbat.; Lawrence held another group meeting on Day 7, as the urinal that he designed was leaking and nobody had informed him. The issue of toilet hygiene was also raised, and this discussion escalates into an argument. Ray, the scrap man, visits the dump later in the day and buys some, but not all, of the waste that the group have collected. Overall, £45 was made.	N/A	1.7 million
3	Days 8–15	Rob entered the dump on the morning of Day 8 to tell the participants that he would be staying with them for the next 24 hours. He took Selena, Jarvis and Sylvia on a trip around the dump to try to inspire them to improve the camp's appearance. Meanwhile, Sasha and Jermaine made a hot tub out of objects from the landfill and Jason celebrated his birthday.; Rob leaves the camp on Day 9, telling the group that they could put more effort into improving the comfort and appearance of the landfill. Jason starts work on a solar-powered shower and unwanted plants are delivered to the dump, which the participants make a garden from.; Lawrence and Ian took Rob's comments into consideration on Day 10 and set plans for improvements to the living space, which they decided to implement over the next three days. 1000 unwanted mobile phones were delivered to the site and the group constructed a cycle-powered generator to charge a battery for the phones so they could telephone home.; On Day 11, Edwin and Sasha sorted through discarded textiles from the dump and Jason continued work on the shower.; Day 12 saw Ray the rag and bone man return to the dump. He gave the group £82 for the objects that they had gathered; the group used this money to buy a wind turbine.; Sasha took charge of the construction of the sauna on Day 13, while the group uses the wind turbine to power a refrigerator.; Lawrence lead the group on the reconstruction of the shelter on Day 14. He planned the project, allocated the individual jobs and organised a rota for breaks.; The group worked through the rain on Day 15 to construct their shelter. Edwin, Sasha and Sylvia lost their shower privileges as they overslept.	N/A	1.5 million
4	Days 16–21	The group constructed the shelter's roof for most of Day 16 and Rob spoke to the participants about electronic waste.; The group woke on Day 17 to find that their shelter was not watertight, as rain had come through the structure during the night, and they spent most of the day correcting this problem. Selena and Jermaine stirred the group's feces into the composter, adding worms which Rob had provided. Sasha opened the spa which she had constructed and the group nominated Edwin, Sasha, Jermain and Ian for a recycling challenge.; Edwin, Sasha, Jermain and Ian woke at 5:30 am on Day 18 to take part in a recycling challenge. They traveled on a waste collection vehicle, collecting rubbish from nearby homes. The rubbish that they collected was deposited in the dump, where the other participants joined them in sorting out what could be recycled. The group passed this task, and received a biodiesel generator as a reward.; On Day 19, the group turned on their biodiesel generator and powered objects from the dump such as a lava lamp. The group made a £120 profit from selling objects to the rag and bone man. They decided to pay for the rental of An Inconvenient Truth to watch on the TV/DVD Player that they found, despite some members of the group wanting to watch Borat. The results of the carbon footprint questionnaires were revealed.; The participants celebrated their final night on the dump with a party on Day 20.; Day 21 saw the participants gather their belongings as they prepared to leave the landfill. Friends and family members arrived at the dump and were shown around by the participants.	The remaining 10 participants left the landfill, splitting the £20,000 prize money equally.	1.9 million

== Reaction ==
=== Viewing figures ===
Dumped received relatively low viewing figures for a peak time programme on a terrestrial channel. The first episode of the programme received just 2.4 million viewers, 10% of the audience, compared to the television premiere of The Queen on ITV1 which was watched by an average of 7.9 million people and attracted a 36% audience share. Coming Down the Mountain, also airing at the same time on BBC One, was watched by 4.7 million and a 20% share. The second episode was watched by 1.7 million, compared to the 3.6 million that watched the opening episode of the third series of ITV1's Hell's Kitchen. The penultimate episode was viewed by 1.5 million viewers and had a 7% audience share, while Hell's Kitchen received 3.4 million viewers and a 15% audience share. The final episode of the programme attracted 1.9 million viewers and an audience share of 8%, while 4.2 million viewed Hell's Kitchen, a 19% audience share. Both programmes were beaten in their slot by BBC One's Traffic Cops, which attracted 5.5 million and a 25% share of the audience.

=== Reviews ===
Dumped was met with a mixed reaction from critics. James Walton, of The Telegraph, was critical of the programme and its purpose; on Darren's departure, he said: "According to the narrator, this proved that Darren “didn’t understand” the experiment. Another interpretation, of course, would be that he did." The Times criticised the programme for setting the programme in an artificial rubbish dump for health and safety reasons, comparing it to various fakery scandals that had taken place in the programme Blue Peter in the past year. However, Nigel Kendall of the same newspaper called the programme "entertaining" and its contestants "likeable", while Paul Hoggart said that it gets its point across. Website TV Scoop said that the programme was "a great experiment", but did not approve of the inclusion of "fame hungry" participants and compared the programme to the most recent series of Big Brother. The website Hecklerspray gave the programme a negative review, calling the participants "absolute fucking morons", and Orange gave the programme 3 out of 5 stars. Channel 4 controller Julian Bellamy commented on the programme's failure during Edinburgh Television Festival 2008, saying that it "didn't have the human narrative you need" and that it was "a little bit too like other reality shows".
