= Dry bulk cargo barge =

Vessel designed to carry freight in bulk format

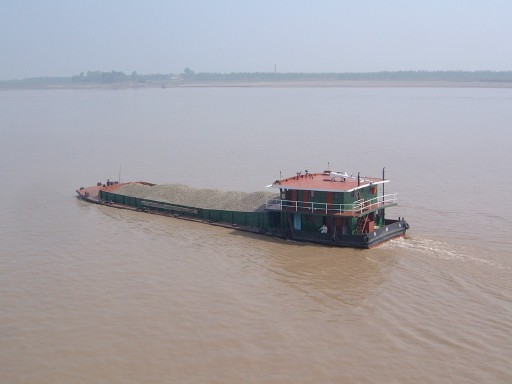
A self-propelled dry bulk barge carrying crushed stone near Wuhan, 18 June 2006

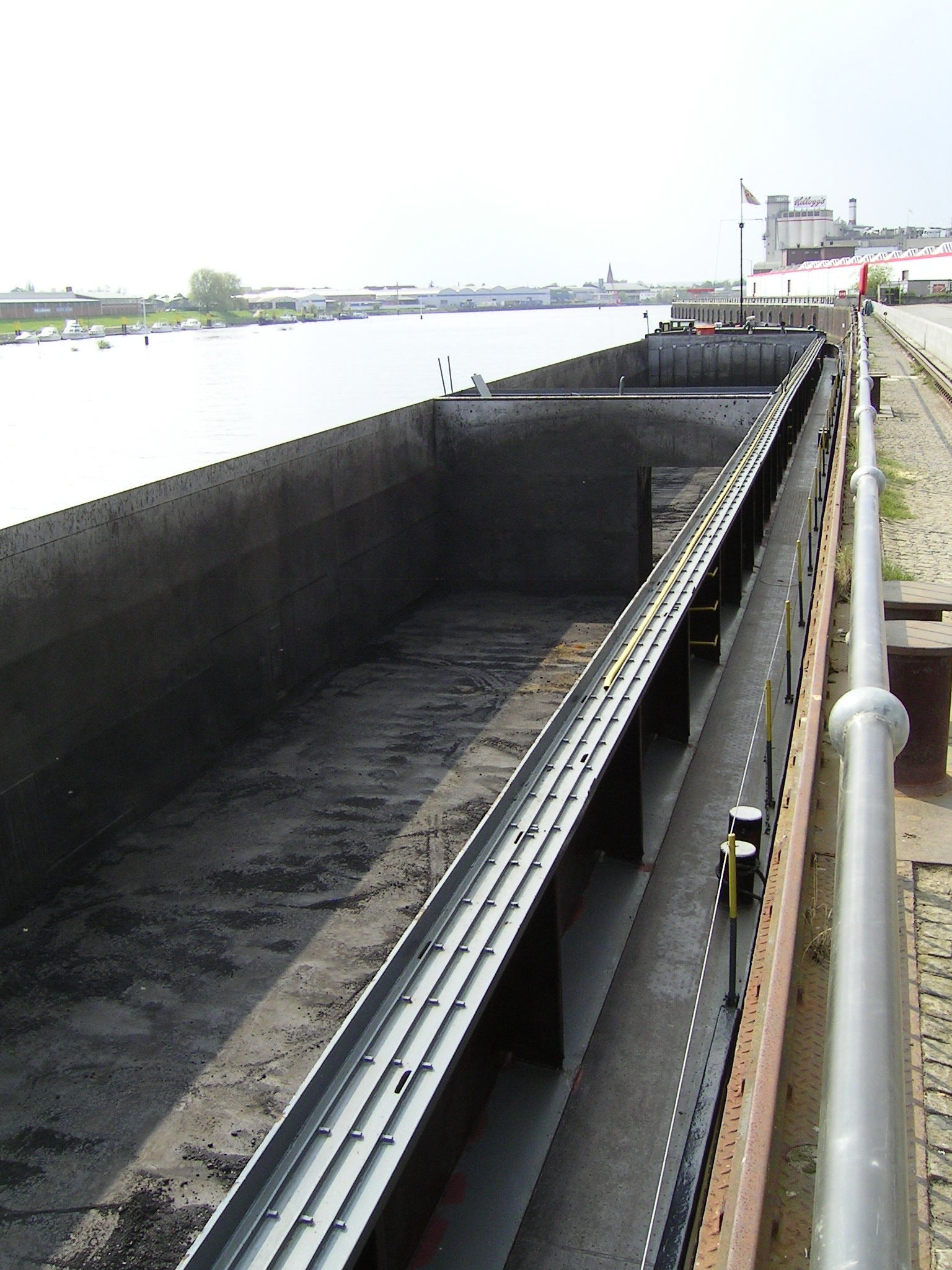
An empty coal barge showing cargo bay smaller than hull along the Weser River in Bremen, May 2005

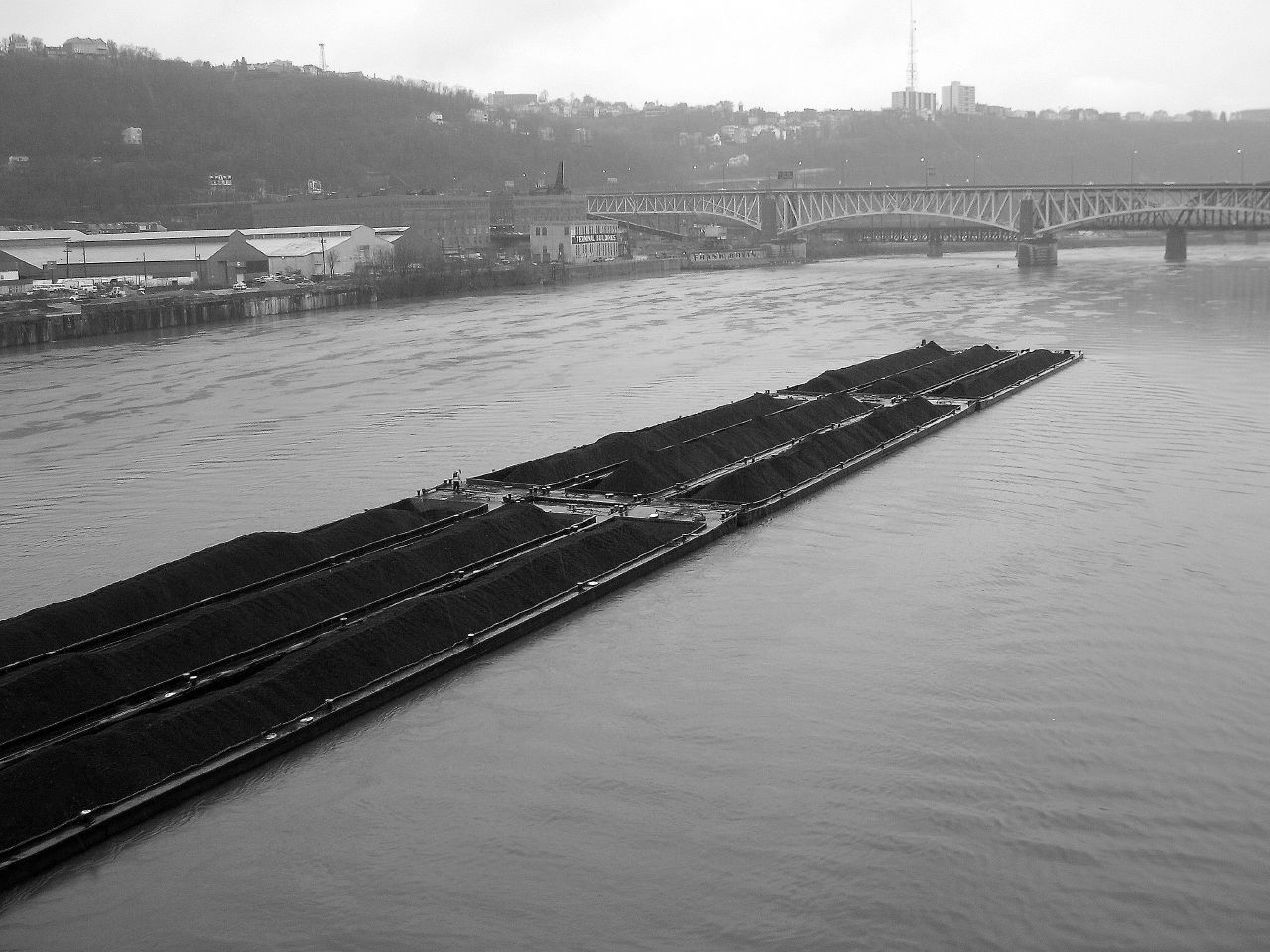
15 long coal barges on the Monongahela River near Pittsburgh, 28 March 2005

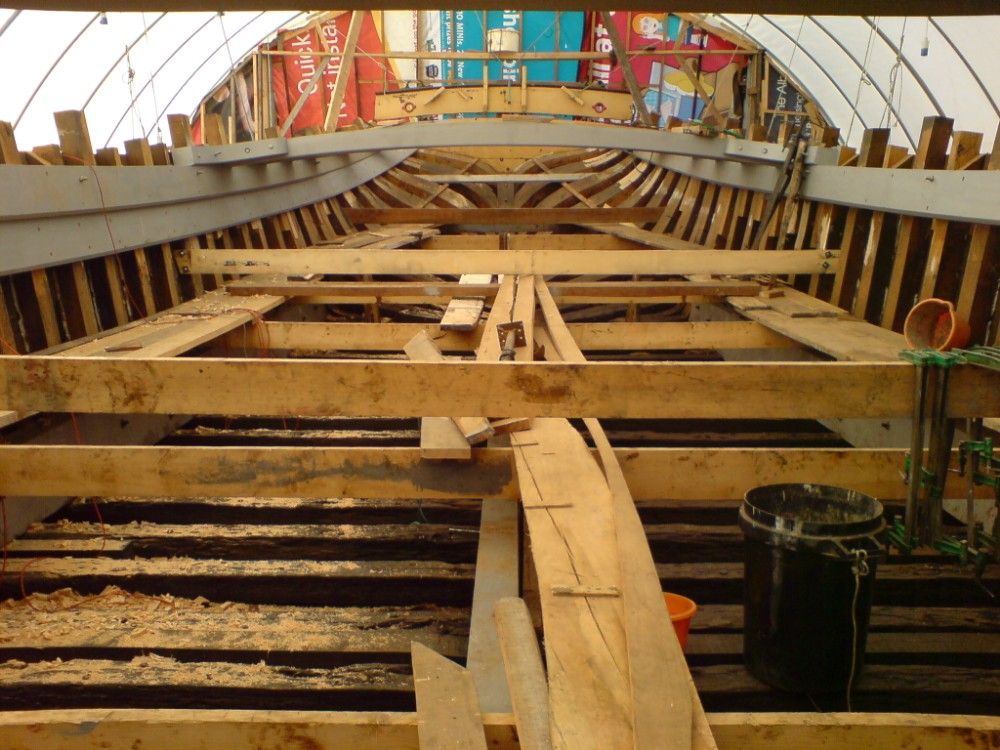
The 1906 wooden sailing barge Thalatta (which used to carry pig iron) is being rebuilt in this photograph from 21 September 2008

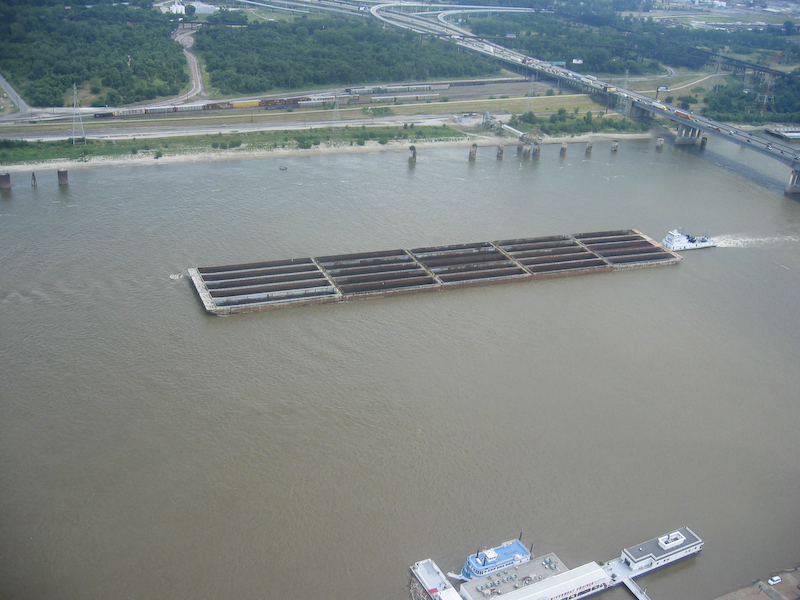
A tow made up of 25 empty barges (5 raked in front, 5 raked abaft, 15 boxed in center) heads up the Mississippi River as seen from the St. Louis Arch 23 June 2007

A dry bulk cargo barge is a barge designed to carry freight such as coal, cement, ores, grain, sand or gravel, or similar materials. It is common for a barge to be handled by multiple vessels and even multiple vessels each barge voyage (empty to empty).

== Construction, materials and design ==
Barges are usually constructed of steel. They have an outer hull, and one or more internal holds.

A rake barge has a bow shaped to cause less resistance when being pushed and is usually placed at the head of the tow.

A box barge has no rake to the ends and is usually placed in the center and rear of the tow and can hold more cargo.

Barges can be equipped with covers of various types if the cargo is weather-sensitive (finished steel or grain). Generally, these covers are fabricated of fiberglass or steel. They can be lifted or rolled away for access to the hold.

Barges have coaming, that is sides which are high around the copper or tank. Covers are designed to fit over the coaming. They are used to protect weather sensitive cargo such as grain. Large, typically constructed of steel or fiberglass. Depending on style, they can be lifted off by crane or rolled away for access to the hopper. A hopper is an open hold on a barge for cargo.

== History ==
In 2004, the dry bulk cargo barge fleet on the Mississippi River System (Mississippi, Gulf Intracoastal Waterway east and west, Ohio, Illinois, Missouri Rivers, etc.) stood at 5,836 open hoppers and 11,572 covered hoppers, for a total of 17,408, according to the Criton Corporation. Smaller barge fleets also operate on the East (Hudson River, etc.) and West coasts (Columbia River, Sacramento River, etc.) of the United States, and in numerous countries including India.

== Operations ==
Barge loading

Barge loading should be conducted in a manner that minimizes the amount of cargo spilled onto the deck. The loading process is the responsibility of the loader operator at the loading facility.

Barge unloading

Barge unloading should be conducted in a manner that minimizes the amount of cargo spilled onto the deck. The unloading process is the responsibility of the unloader operator at the unloading facility. Unloading can be done with a Grab Bucket Barge Unloader or a Continuous Barge Unloader (CBU). The Grab Bucket system employs a clamshell bucket suspended by a set of hoisting cables, with a separate set of control cables that open and close the bucket. The CBU is a series of buckets supported between two strands of roller chain, running in a continuous loop.

Cargo spillage

The nature of the dry bulk commodity business is such that some amount of cargo spillage is typically unavoidable. In such cases the following practices are standard:

- When possible, cargo residue will be swept and shoveled back into the hopper, provided cargo is the same.
- If the current cargo is not the same as the residue remaining on the barge deck, the residue should be swept up against the barge coaming and in some cases may be shoveled and placed into a container or bag.
- If the quantity of cargo exceeds an amount that can be safely cleaned, then a barge report will be filed and the cargo will be cleaned at a facility.

Below deck water

Barge hulls are maintained to minimize the accumulation of river water below deck. If a barge develops a detectable leak, crew members will go below deck and install a temporary patch, known as a shingle. Water that accumulates in void tank generally needs to be removed.

Barge inspection

When a barge is picked up by a boat, the on watch deck crew does an inspection of each barge for items such as cargo spillage, pollution and trash. Barge inspections are recorded on a barge inspection form. Barge inspection forms are maintained shore side. At least once every watch, the deck crew should inspect the void tanks of each barge to ensure that no water is being taken on.

Deck scaling

Barge decks are maintained to minimize the formation of large rust scales, this is typically accomplished by painting the deck as needed.

== Terminology ==
A Barge Voyage is the time from which an empty barge is placed in tow, until it has been loaded, emptied and returned to a fleet. It may include stops in a terminal fleet, cleaning and/or repair.

Cargo Trimming is a cargo practice on barges to shifting or rearrange cargo to level a barge.

== See also ==
- Bulk carrier - larger vessels that carry the same types of materials but may be self-propelled or ocean worthy
- Buhler - Manufacturer of barge loading and unloading equipment]
- Heyl & Patterson Inc. - manufacturer of various types of barge unloaders
- Hopper barge
- Liquid cargo barge - carries wet products such as vegetable oils, orange juice, liquid fuels, etc
