= Grain bin =

Storage container for dry grain

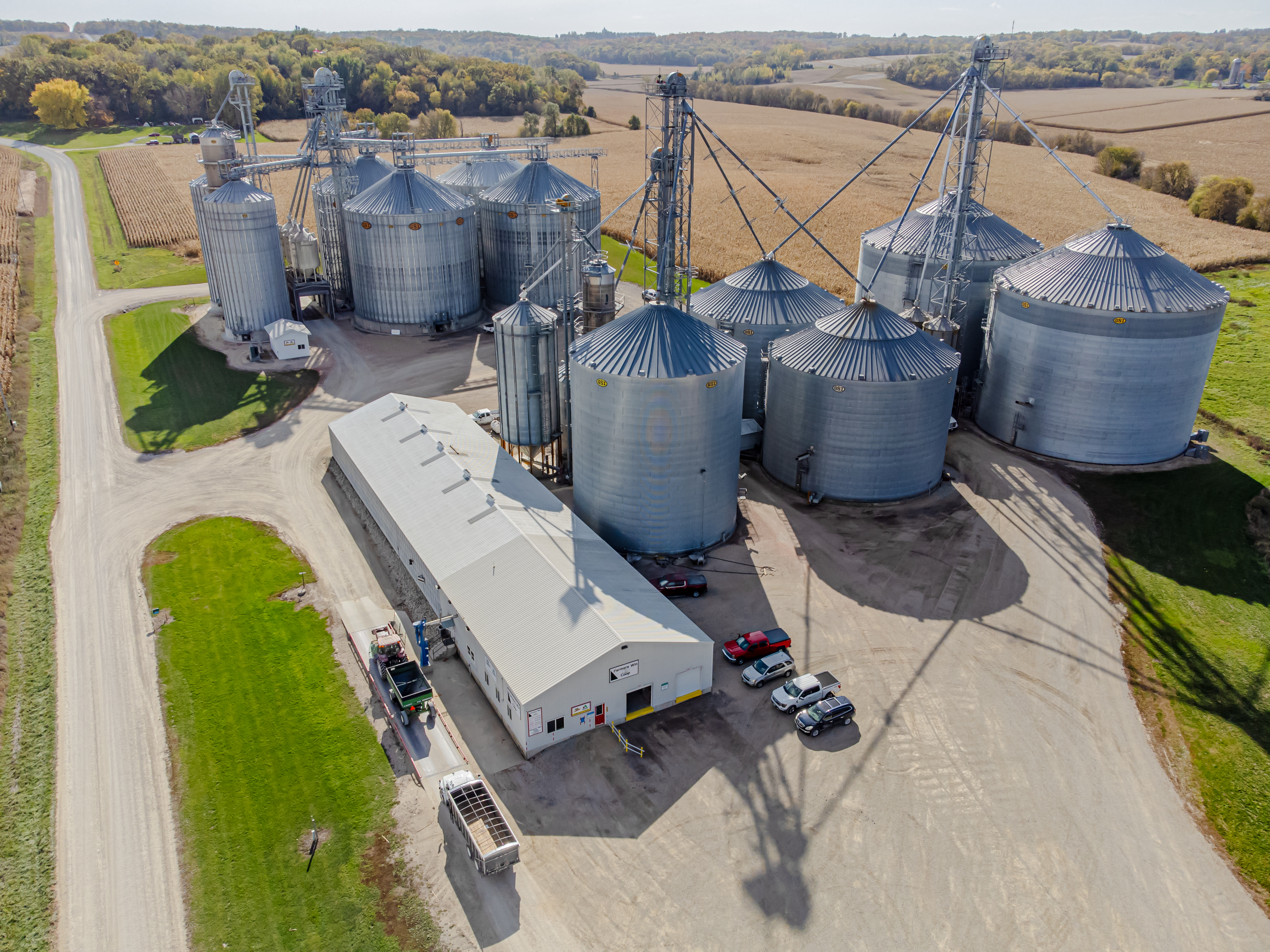
Grain bins in southern Minnesota

Grain bins are bulk storage structures for dry wheat, soybean, maize, oats, barley and more. Grain bins are cylinders made of corrugated sheets or sheet metal with a coned metal roof that has vents. The floors of grain bins have aeration systems to keep good air flow through the stored products and keep it at a good temperature and humidity level to prevent spoilage. In smaller grain systems, bins may serve both drying and storage purposes when a dedicated grain dryer is not present. These drying bins often use a stirring machine to mix dried grain at the bottom with wetter grain near the top, promoting even moisture levels throughout the bin. In drying bins, heated air is pushed through the grain using fans, with attached heaters, located at the base of the bin. Grain bins may be filled using augers in smaller setups, while larger systems typically use receiving pits for unloading grain from hopper trailers. From the pit, grain is raised vertically using a bucket elevator (also known as a grain leg) and directed through spouting systems that rely on gravity to fill individual bins. In some configurations, tubed conveyors are used to transport grain to bins located farther from the central leg. The grain bin sits on top of a strong concrete base to help the structure withstand high winds and the massive weight from the grain.

== Difference between grain bins and silos ==
Grain bins differ from farm silos which usually store foraged silage for animal feed and are made of concrete or glass-fused-to-steel. Silos have no ventilation system, promoting fermentation of the grain product. Silos typically have a domed roof with no conveyors.

== Grain moisture levels ==
Corn is typically stored around 15% wet basis and soybean around 13%. The cold winter months are ideal for storing crops because of the low humidity levels, temperature, and pest problems. Storing grain in the bins for more than six months into the spring and summer means they will then have to be aerated more to keep the temperature and humidity down.

=== Grain dryers ===
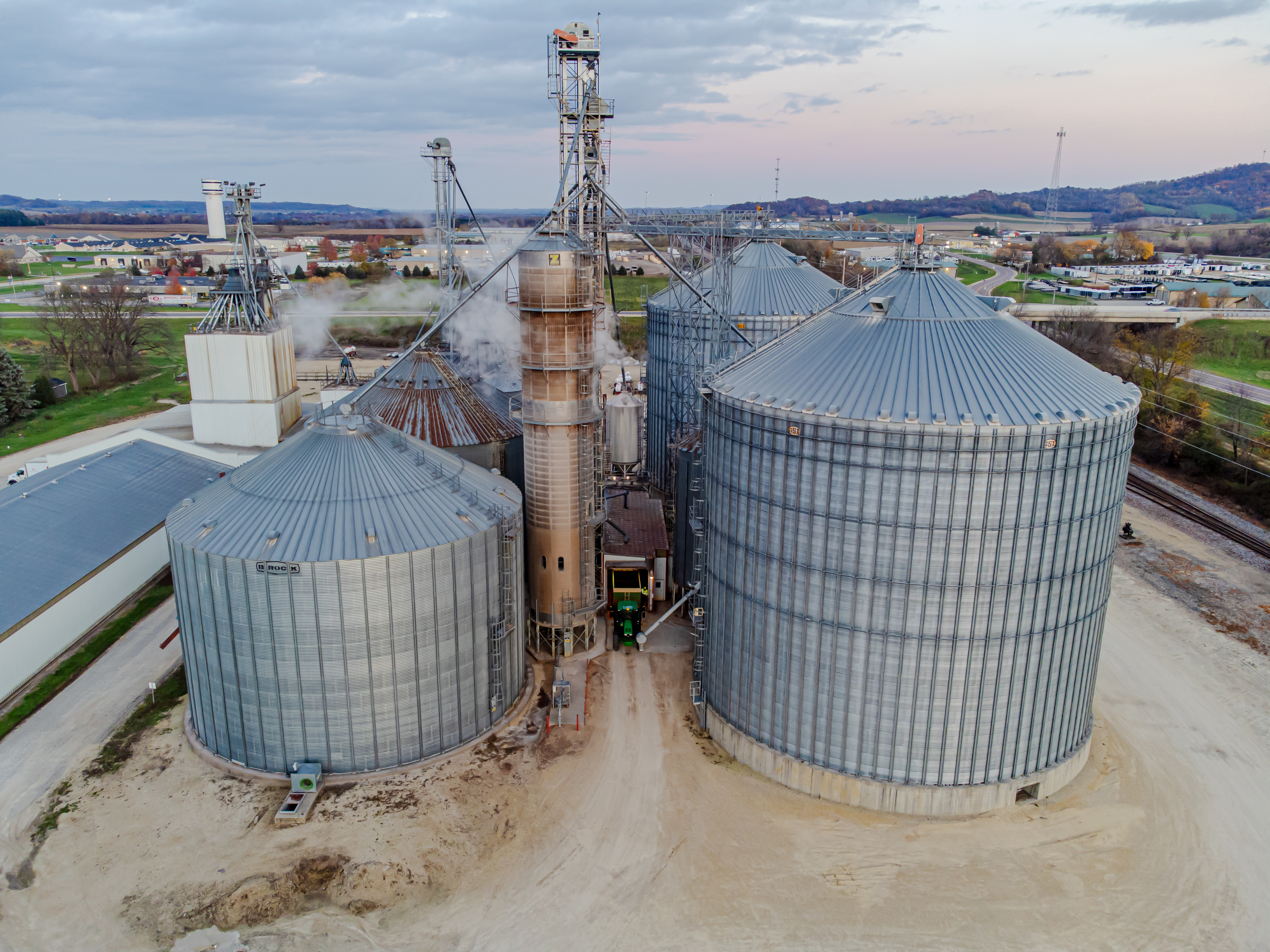
Grain bins with dryer unit (center) putting out steam from drying the corn (Click for video)

Grain bins typically have grain dryers next to them which heat the grain to lower moisture content before storage in the bins. Applying too much heat to the grain when attempting to lower moisture content can cause shrinkage which cuts into profits. Some farms have small grain bins and a dryer to lower moisture content before they sell to a larger local commercial grain elevator.

== Transporting to and from the grain bin ==
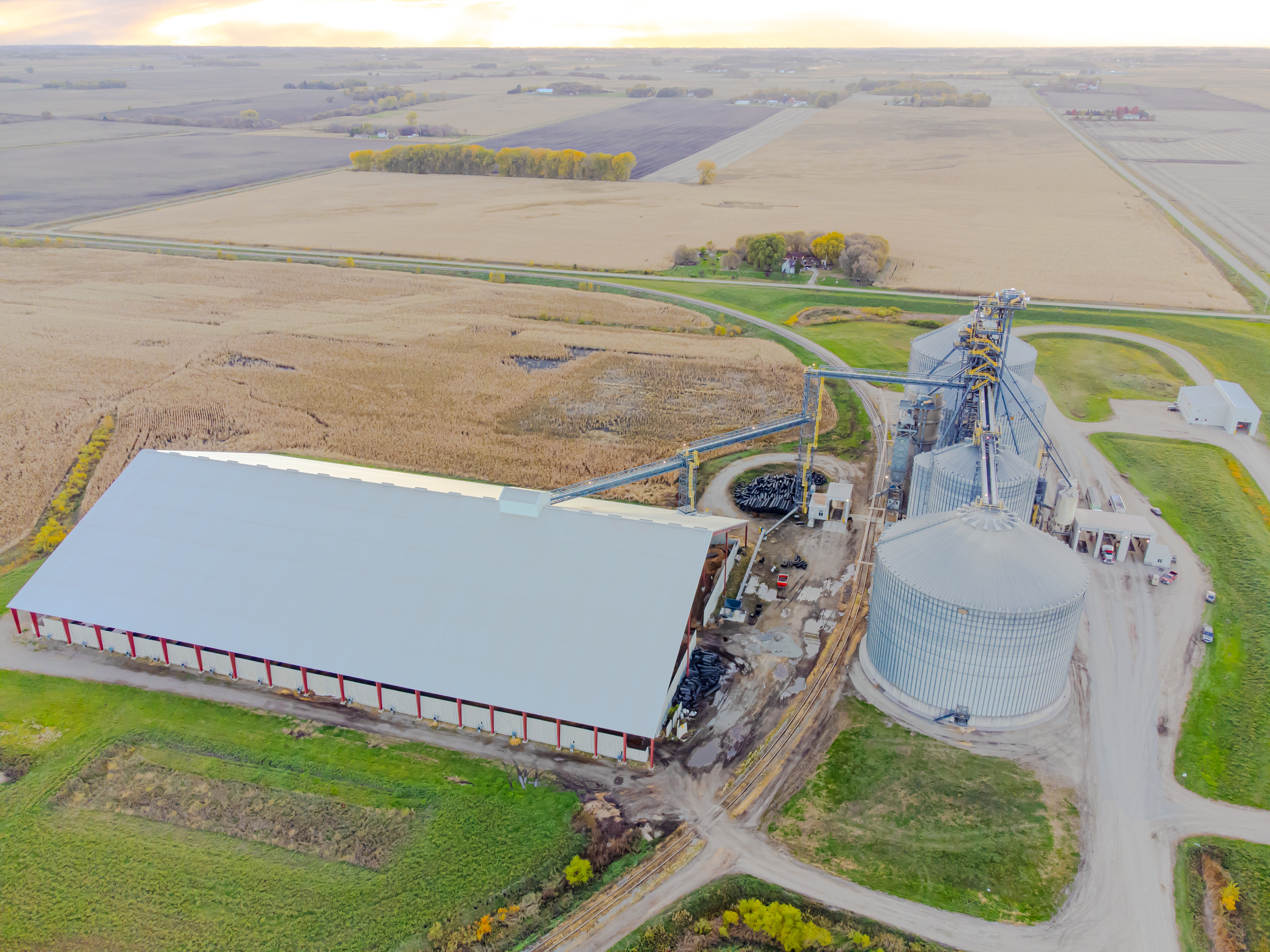
Grain bins at the railroad grain elevator site

When grain is harvested from a farm with a Combine harvester the combine typically loads the grain into a grain cart, which then unloads it into a grain hopper trailer, gravity wagon, or dump truck to be hauled to the local grain bin. The commercial grain bin operator then sells the commodity at an opportune time and it is then transported, with a grain hopper trailer or dump truck, to a grain elevator to be put on a barge or grain train, if the grain bin isn't already at the grain elevator site.
