= Vacuum valve =

Vacuum valve may refer to:

- Trickle valve, a type of airlock
- Vacuum breaker, an anti-siphon valve
- Vacuum delay valve, an automobile component
- Vacuum tube, an electron tube or thermionic valve
- Vacuum interrupter, an electrical device acting similar to a circuit breaker, used in higher voltage applications
