= Hopper wagon (disambiguation) =

Hopper wagon may refer to:

- Hopper car
- Hopper wagon

== See also ==
- Gravity wagon, also called a slant wagon
