= De Skarrenmolen, Scharsterbrug =

Netherlands smock mill

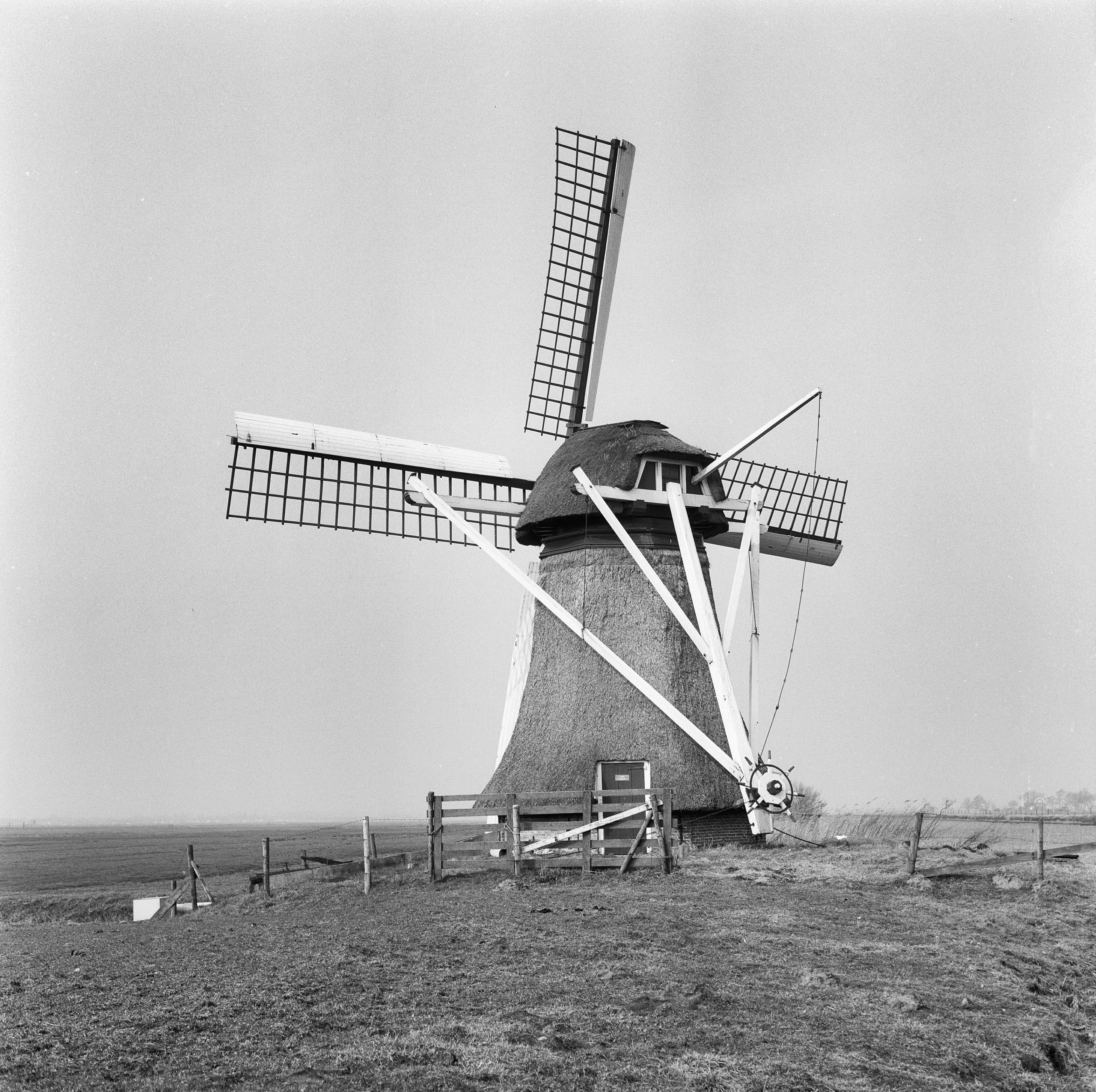
- De Skarrenmolen, March 1983.

Origin
- Mill name: De Skarrenmolen
- Mill location: Nabij Hollandiastraat 7, 8517 HC, Scharsterbrug
- Coordinates: 52°56′50″N 5°46′40″E
- Operator(s): Stichting Penninga's Molen, Joure
- Year built: 1888

Information
- Purpose: Drainage mill, formerly also a corn mill
- Type: Smock mill
- Storeys: Two storey smock
- Base storeys: One storey base
- Smock sides: Eight sides
- No. of sails: Four sails
- Type of sails: Common sails, Fauël system on leading edges
- Windshaft: Cast iron
- Winding: Tailpole and winch
- Type of pump: Archimedes screw

De Skarrenmolen is a smock mill in Scharsterbrug, Friesland, Netherlands which was built in 1888. The mill has been restored to working order. It is listed as a Rijksmonument.

== History ==
De Skarrenmolen was built in 1888. It served as a corn mill and a drainage mill originally, but now is only a drainage mill. The mill drains the 60 hectares (150 acres) Rijpkema polder. The mill was sold to the Stichting Skarrenmolen in 1982 following the installation of an electric pump to drain the polder. Restorations were carried out on the mill in 1987, 1993 and 1995. The 1987 restoration saw the wooden windshaft replaced by a cast-iron one. Wooden sail stocks were replaced by steel ones. In 2003, ownership of the mill was transferred to Stichting Penninga's Molen, Joure. The mill is listed as a Rijksmonument, No.13251.

== Description ==
De Skarrenmolen is what the Dutch describe as a Grondzeiler. It is a two-storey smock mill on a single-storey base. There is no stage, the sails reaching almost to ground level. The mill is winded by tailpole and winch. The smock and cap are thatched. The sails are Common sails, with the Fauël system fitted to the leading edges. They have a span of 13.70 metres (44 ft 11 in). The sails are carried on a cast-iron windshaft, which was cast by Gieterij Hardinxveld-Giessendam in 1987 from a pattern held by Stichting De Fryske Mole. The windshaft carries the brake wheel which has 37 cogs. This drives the wallower (18 cogs) at the top of the upright shaft. At the bottom of the upright shaft there are two crown wheels The upper crown wheel, which has 29 cogs drives an Archimedes' screw via a crown wheel. The lower crown wheel, which has 32 cogs is carried on the axle of an Archimedes' screw, which is used to drain the polder. The axle of the screw is 41 centimetres (1 ft 4 in) diameter. The screw is 1.13 metres (3 ft 8 in) diameter. It is inclined at 26°. Each revolution of the screw lifts 388 litres (85 imp gal) of water.

== Public access ==
De Skarrenmolen is open to the public whenever it is working or by appointment.
