= Archimedes' screw =

Hydraulic machine

An animation of the Archimedes screw as a water pump, with the red sphere representing a water droplet

An animation of a screw in a cylindrical casing rotating downwards, with the red sphere representing a water droplet

An Archimedes' screw (Note: Also known as the Archimedean screw, hydrodynamic screw, water screw, and cochila.) is a hydraulic machine composed of an outer cylinder and an inner cylinder with helical blades. It can be operated both as a pump and a power generator, though it has been used for other purposes, such as drainage and sewage management.

The origins of the water screw are unknown. Archimedes of Syracuse is traditionally credited with inventing the water screw, but other academics argue Archimedes found the Egyptians already using the screw. The earliest mention of the screw is from between 250 and 220 BC, and archaeological remains of water screws in Europe and Asia suggested that it was diffused across the territories of the Roman Empire, though the screw largely fell out of use in Europe in the third century AD. However, it resurfaced during Renaissance, with the screw introduced to other regions such as China and Japan. In 1991, a patent for the Archimedes screw turbine was filed, and the testing was done between 1993 and 1995.

As a machine used for lifting water from a low-lying body of water into irrigation ditches, it lifts water by turning a screw-shaped surface inside a pipe. In the modern world, Archimedes' screw pumps are widely used in wastewater treatment plants and for dewatering low-lying regions. Run in reverse, Archimedes screw turbines act as a small hydroelectric powerplant that can be applied even in low head sites. Such generators operate in a wide range of flows (0.01 m^{3}/s to 14.5 m^{3}/s) and heads (0.1 m to 10 m), including low heads and moderate flow rates that are not ideal for traditional turbines and not occupied by high performance technologies.

== History ==
=== Origins ===
The origins of the water screw are unknown; Archimedes is credited with inventing the water screw, but this point is controversial amongst historians. According to Posidonius, Archimedes invented the water screw when he visited Egypt, possibly between 283 and 246 BC, with academics arguing that he invented the water screw based on a water wheel he saw in operation. Other academics posit that Archimedes possibly found Egyptians already using the screw, though Canadian archaeologist John Peter Oleson notes that "no explanation is ever provided for the subsequent identification of the device with Archimedes or for the total lack of any literary or archaeological evidence for the existence of the water-screw before ca. 250 BC", and argues that there may have been confusion over terms used by Posidonius. (Note: Posidonius says in an unknown work that "οὓς Αρχιμήδης ὁ Συρακόσιος εὗρεν, ὅτε παρέβαλεν εἰς Αἴγυπτον... θαυμάσαι δ ̓ ἄν τις εἰκότως τοῦ τεχνίτου τὴν ἐπίνοιαν οὐ μόνον ἐν τούτοις, ἀλλὰ καὶ ἐν ἄλλοις πολλοῖς καὶ μείζοσι, διαβεβοημένοις κατὰ πᾶσαν τὴν οἰκουμένην, περὶ ὧν τὰ κατὰ μέρος,ὅταν ἐπὶ τὴν ̓Αρχιμήδους ἡλικίαν ἔλθωμεν, ἀκριβῶς διέξιμεν", which translates to "they draw off the streams of water with the so-called Egyptian screw, which Archimedes the Syracusan invented when he visited Egypt... One might reasonably marvel at the inventiveness of the craftsman not only in this, but also in many other even greater inventions celebrated throughout the whole world, each of which we shall discuss carefully in turn when we come to the age of Archimedes". Oleson argues that the term "εὑρίσκω" means "'discover – in its subsidiary sense of 'invent'", and that "τεχνίτου" (craftsman) may be a reference to Archimedes or an inventive human. Oleson also argues that the academics with the opposing viewpoint interpret Posidonius's statement as Archimedes finding the screw when he came to Egypt.) Scholars also argue that Archimedes's investigations into spirals and the quadrature of a circle led to the development of Archimedes' screw.

Assyrianologist Stephanie Dalley argued in several of her publications that according to an inscription from Assyrian king Sennacherib, bronze water screws were used to irrigate the Hanging Gardens of Babylon; (Note: Sennacherib wrote in the inscription that "in order to draw water up all day long I had ropes, bronze wires and bronze chains made, and instead of shadufs I set up the gišmahhu and alamittu palms over cisterns". Dalley interprets gišmahhu ("great tree trunk") to be a cylinder, and alamittu (palm trees) as a metaphor for the helix of a screw.) she also interpreted Strabo's Geography and Philo of Byzantium's On the Seven Wonders of the World to imply that water screws were used in the Hanging Gardens of Babylon. An Archimedes' screw, under Dalley's supervision, was constructed from Sennacherib's inscription as part of a BBC documentary to determine if the screw was known in Assyria, with Oleson supervising the construction of a screw using Vitruvius's description in De Architectura. Academic Yaman Boluk proposed that if Dalley's theory was true, then the screws would have had an opening on its outer cylinder, and its blades would have been separated from the outer cylinder unlike the screw constructed in the BBC documentary, which had the screw's blades joined to the outer cylinder.

=== Antiquity and decline ===
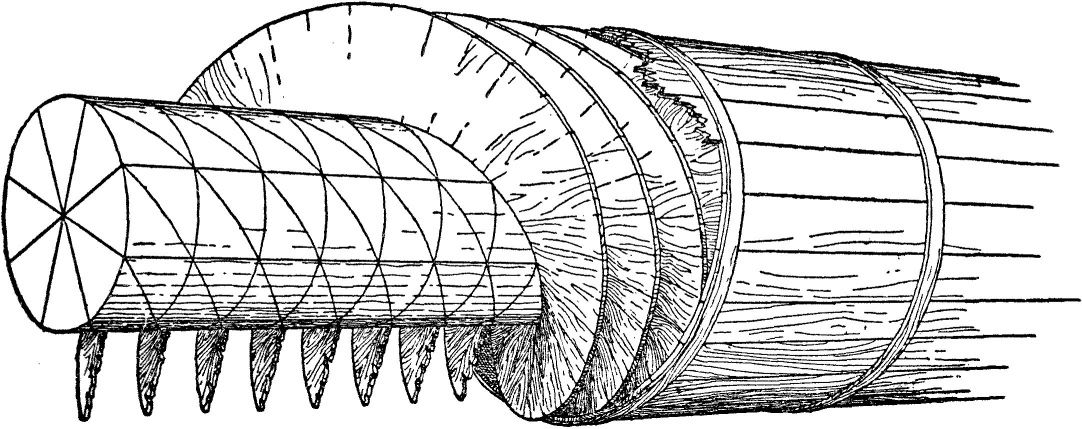
A sketch of Vitruvius's description of the Archimedes' screw in De architectura

Moschion reported in Treatise on the Great Ship of Hieron of Syracuse, written between 250 and 220 BC, that the screw was used as a bilge pump in a ship built for Hiero II of Syracuse, and Posidonius also recorded water screws in Spanish mines used for drainage. Oleson notes that archaeological remains of the water screw were found in the territory of the Roman Empire such as Egypt, Spain, France, and Italy, whilst literary texts and inscriptions describe the screw to be present in Mesopotamia, Egypt, Syria, and Spain, though the lack of screws in Rome and northern Europe suggests that the screw was not utilised much there as irrigation and mining were less prioritised in those regions.

By the late 1st century BC or 1st century AD, there were not many records mentioning the screw, according to Oleson's investigation in Fayum; he posits that they were either uncommon in the city or were not taxed, and hence were not recorded. Diodorus describes the Archimedes' screw usage for irrigation in the Nile Delta for nearby military camps and cities in his Bibliotheca Historica, and Vitruvius details a wooden Archimedes' screw with eight blades in his De Architectura, written between 27–22 BC. The earliest depiction of the water screw is a fresco at the villa Casa di P. Cornelius Teges in Pompeii dating earlier than 79 AD. Archimedes' screw continued to be used in Europe until it fell out of use in the end of the third century. Historian Lynn White Jr. posits that the screw continued to be used in Visigothic and Islamic Spain, with Oleson theorising that the Arabs may have reintroduced the screw to Europe following the conquest of Spain in the 8th century.

=== Revival and development ===
The first illustration of the Archimedes' screw after antiquity was from German engineer Konrad Kyeser in his 1405 manuscript Bellifortis. During the Renaissance, scientists such as Leonardo da Vinci and Agostino Ramelli depicted on the Archimedes' screw in several of their "theatre of machine" books, which catalogued machines, and Galileo Galilei explained the function of the Archimedes' screw in his Mecchanice. Polder mills, consisting of windmill-powered Archimedes' screws, were used during the Dutch Golden Age for land drainage as it could move large quantities of water in low heads. In 1612, Italian Jesuit Sabatino de Ursis along with Chinese official Xu Guangqi published Hydraulic Methods of the Far West, a book describing the Archimedes' screw's usage in agriculture and its construction; although other books were published, there was limited use of the screw in China and Korea, despite praises from scholars. Albert Koenig suggests that the screw was not widely used there as imperial scholars preferred works on philosophy, among other factors such as high production costs for an Archimedean screw and the impracticality of Virtuvius's design. Portuguese traders ostensibly introduced the Archimedes' screw to Japan in 1637, with scrolls dating between the 1730s to the 1850s suggesting that miners in Sado used the Archimedes' screw for mining gold.

In 1738, Daniel Bernoulli investigated the size of a pocket of water carried by a water screw; Leonhard Euler would later develop a question regarding the theory of the screw as part of his Quaestiones Mathematicae, 14 mathematical questions that were read to the Petersburg Academy in 1757. However, Archimedes' screws were not commonly used as water pumps when public water systems were first established in the early 19th century because of its low delivery head. Dutch engineer Joan Muysken investigated the efficiency and discharge capacity of the Archimedes' screw in 1932, and developed the formula for the rotational speed of the screw. In 1991, Karl-August Radlik filed a patent for the Archimedes screw turbine (AST), in which mechanical power would be generated by pouring water from the top. Academics note that the Archimedes' screw was proposed as a generator for mechanical power since 1862, with the screw being used to generate power since the early 1900s in places such as Japan. Klaus Brada experimented with the Archimedes' screw as a turbine between 1993–1995 at the University of Prague, and found that most of the hydraulic energy collected by a screw can be converted to mechanical energy.

== Design ==
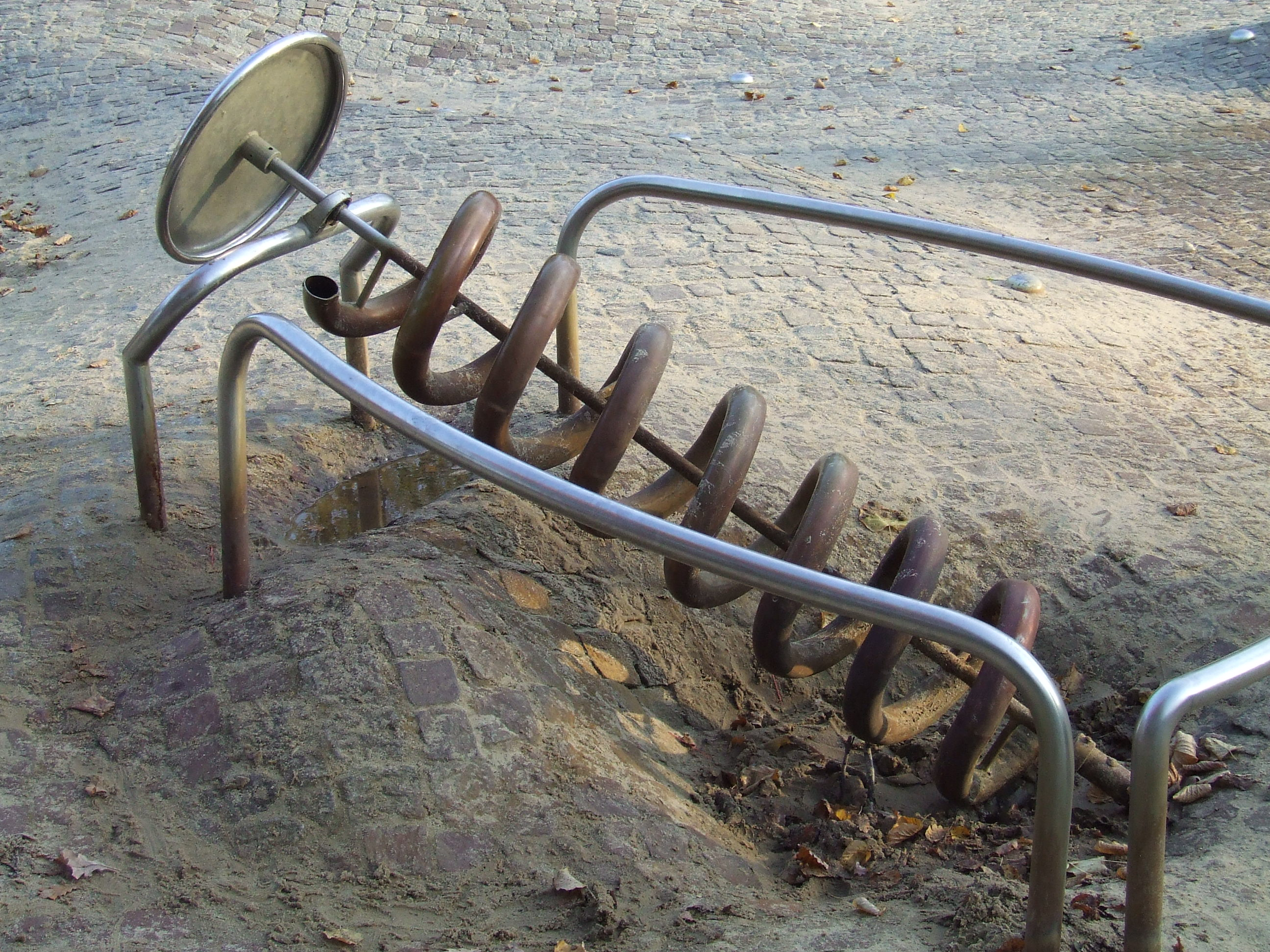
A spiral screw

An Archimedes' screw consists of a screw (a helical surface surrounding a central cylindrical shaft) inside a hollow pipe. The screw is usually turned by windmill, manual labour, cattle, or by modern means, such as a motor. As the shaft turns, the bottom end scoops up a volume of water. This water is then pushed up the tube by the rotating helicoid until it pours out from the top of the tube.

There are four main types of Archimedes' screw:

1. Spiral screws; small closed tubes are wrapped around a larger tube
2. Trough screws; helical blades are wrapped around a central tube, and the screw rotates in a U-shaped trough
3. Tube screws; helical blades are wrapped around a central tube, and the screw is enclosed in a cylinder
4. Casing tube screws; helical blades are wrapped around a central tube, and attached to an enclosed cylinder, resulting in the entire structure to rotate.

Manufacturers do not often use casing tube, tube, and spiral screws as they have poor ventilation and often trap air.

In an Archimedes' screw, there are several parameters to consider, mainly the external and internal parameters. The external parameters include the outer diameter of the screw ($D_O$), the length of the screw ($L$), and the inclination angle of the screw ($\beta$), whilst the internal parameters include the screw's inner radius ($D_i$), the number of blades ($N$), and the screw's pitch ($S$). The properties of the screw's installation site and passing volumetric flow rate often determine the external parameters. The contact surface between the screw and the pipe does not need to be perfectly watertight, as long as the amount of water being scooped with each turn is large compared to the amount of water leaking out of each section of the screw per turn. If water from one section leaks into the next lower one, it will be transferred upwards by the next segment of the screw.

In some designs, the screw is fused to the casing and they both rotate together, instead of the screw turning within a stationary casing. The screw could be sealed to the casing with pitch resin or other adhesive, or the screw and casing could be cast together as a single piece in bronze.

Studies show that the volume of flow passing through Archimedes' screws is a function of inlet depth, diameter and rotation speed of the screw. Therefore, the following analytical equation could be used to design Archimedes' screws:

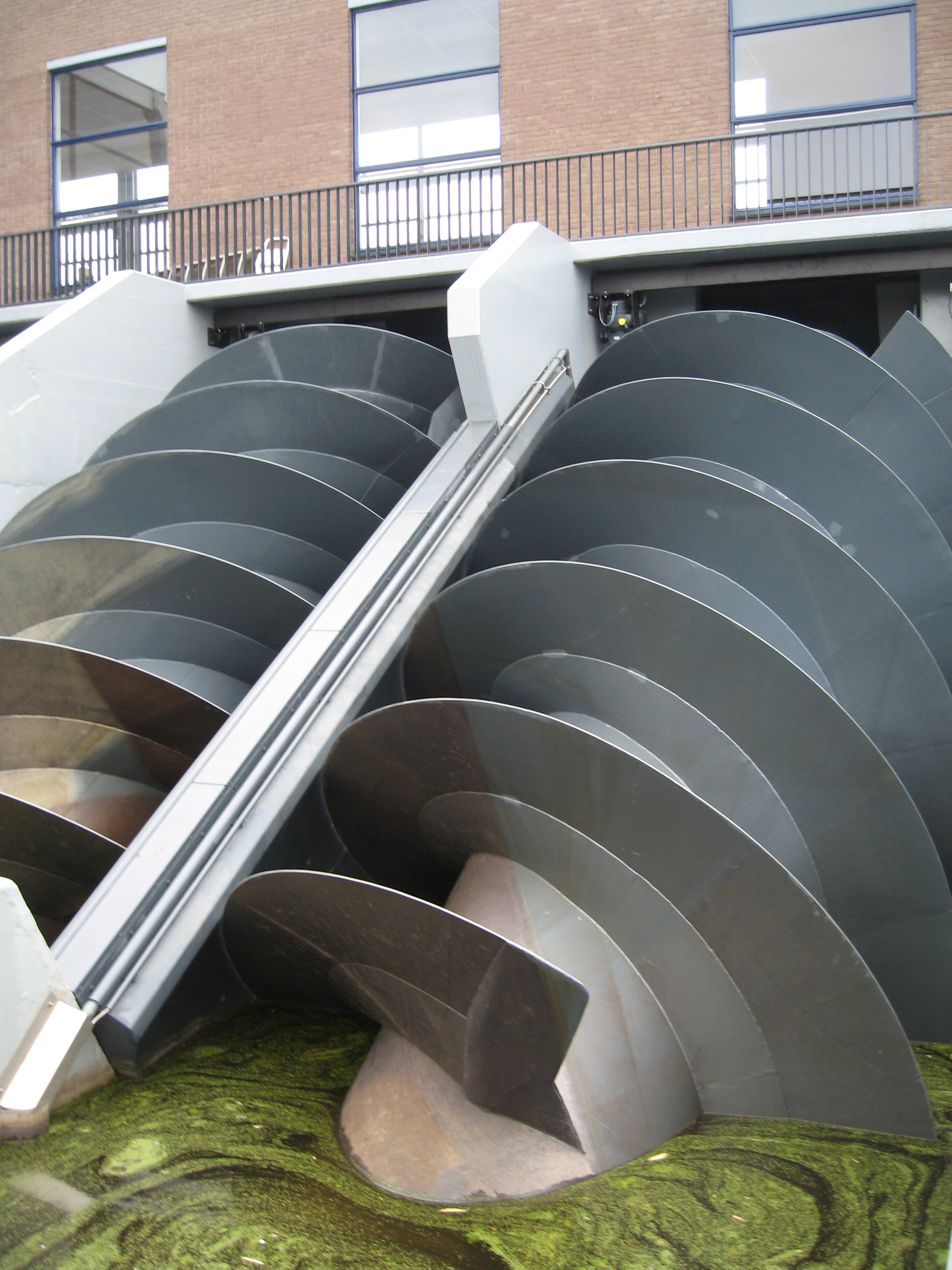
Modern Archimedes' screws, which have replaced some of the windmills used to drain polders, at Kinderdijk in the Netherlands

$D_O =\sqrt[3]{\frac{16\pi Q}{\sigma\omega (2\theta_O-sin2\theta_O-\delta^2(2\theta_i-sin(2\theta_i))}}$

where $D_O$ is in $(m)$ and:

$\omega$: Rotation speed of the Archimedes' screw (rad/s)

$Q$: Volumetric flow rate $(m^3/s)$

Based on the common standards that the Archimedes' screw designers use this analytical equation could be simplified as:

$D_O\approx \eta Q^{3/7}$

The value of η could simply determinate using the $\eta$ graph or $\Theta$ graph. By determination of $D_O$, other design parameters of Archimedes' screws can be calculated using a step-by-step analytical method.

== Usage ==
Archimedes' screws transport liquids from one end to another.

=== Pump ===
The screw was historically used as a water pump.

=== Hydropower ===
Screw turbines (ASTs) are a new form of generator for small hydroelectric powerplants that could be applied even in low-head sites. The low rotation speed of ASTs reduces negative effects on aquatic life. If water is fed into the top of an Archimedes' screw, it will force the screw to rotate. The rotating shaft can then be used to drive an electric generator. Christian Rorres and Oleson posit that the Archimedes' screw's efficiency as a power generator, along with hydropower plants in Europe required to be fish-friendly, has encouraged its use. Such an installation has the same benefits as using the screw for pumping: the ability to handle very dirty water and widely varying rates of flow at high efficiency. Settle Hydro and Torrs Hydro are two reverse screw micro hydro schemes operating in England. The screw works well as a generator at low heads, commonly found in English rivers, including the Thames, powering Windsor Castle.

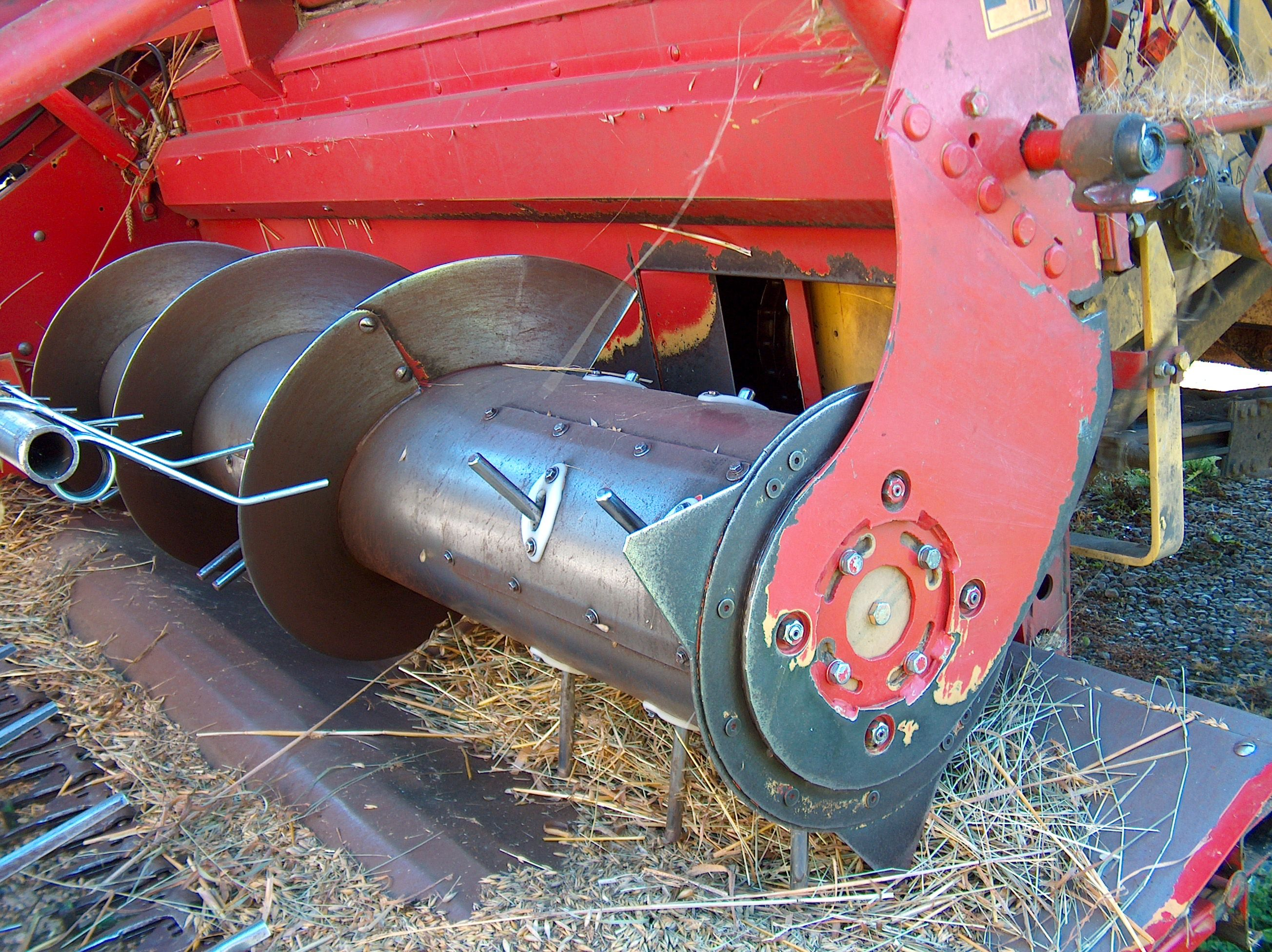
An Archimedes' screw seen on a combine harvester

=== Drainage ===
Archimedes' screws are used in sewage treatment plants because they cope well with varying rates of flow and with suspended solids. On a much larger scale, Archimedes's screws of decreasing pitch are used for the compaction of waste material.

=== Injection moulding ===
A variant of the Archimedes screw can also be found in some injection moulding machines, die casting machines and extrusion of plastics, which employ a screw of decreasing pitch to compress and melt the material. It is also used in a rotary-screw air compressor.

=== Other ===
A screw conveyor is a similar device which transports bulk materials such as powders and cereal grains. It is contained within a tube and turned by a motor to deliver material from one end of the conveyor to the other and particularly suitable for transport of granular materials. It may also be used to transport liquids. In industrial control applications, the conveyor may be used as a rotary feeder or variable rate feeder to deliver a measured rate or quantity of material into a process.

This technology is used primarily at fish hatcheries to lift fish safely from ponds and transport them to another location. An Archimedes' screw was used in the successful 2001 stabilisation of the Leaning Tower of Pisa. Small amounts of subsoil saturated by groundwater were removed from far below the north side of the tower, and the weight of the tower itself corrected the lean.

Other inventions using Archimedes' screws include the auger conveyor in a snow blower, grain elevator, concrete mixer and chocolate fountain.

== See also ==
- Archimedean spiral
- Screw-propelled vehicle
- Screw (simple machine)
- Spiral pump
- Toroidal propeller
- Vitruvius
