= Spiral separator =

Device for separating/sorting slurry or particles

Drawing of a spiral separator

The term spiral separator can refer to either a by density (wet spiral separators), or for a device for sorting particles by shape (dry spiral separators).

== Wet spiral separators ==
Spiral separators of the wet type, also called spiral concentrators, are devices to separate solid components in a slurry, based upon a combination of the solid particle density as well as the particle's hydrodynamic properties (e.g. drag). The device consists of a tower, around which is wound a sluice, from which slots or channels are placed in the base of the sluice to extract solid particles that have come out of suspension.

As larger and heavier particles sink to the bottom of the sluice faster and experience more drag from the bottom, they travel slower, and so move towards the center of the spiral. Conversely, light particles stay towards the outside of the spiral, with the water, and quickly reach the bottom. At the bottom, a "cut" is made with a set of adjustable bars, channels, or slots, separating the low and high density parts.

== Efficiency ==
Typical spiral concentrators will use a slurry from about 20%-40% solids by weight, with a particle size somewhere between 0.75—1.5mm (17-340 mesh), though somewhat larger particle sizes are sometimes used. The spiral separator is less efficient at the particle sizes of 0.1—0.074mm however. For efficient separation, the density difference between the heavy minerals and the light minerals in the feedstock should be at least 1 g/cm^{3}; and because the separation is dependent upon size and density, spiral separators are most effective at purifying ore if its particles are of uniform size and shape. A spiral separator may process a couple tons per hour of ore, per flight, and multiple flights may be stacked in the same space as one, to improve capacity.

Many things can be done to improve the separation efficiency, including:

- changing the rate of material feed
- changing the grain size of the material
- changing the slurry mass percentage
- adjusting the cutter bar positions
- running the output of one spiral separator (often, a third, intermediate, cut) through a second.
- adding washwater inlets along the length of the spiral, to aid in separating light minerals
- adding multiple outlets along the length, to improve the ability of the spiral to remove heavy contaminants
- adding ridges on the sluice at an angle to the direction of flow.

== Dry spiral separators ==
Dry spiral separators, capable of distinguishing round particles from nonrounds, are used to sort the feed by shape. The device consists of a tower, around which is wound an inwardly inclined flight. A catchment funnel is placed around this inner flight. Round particles roll at a higher speed than other objects, and so are flung off the inner flight and into the collection funnel. Shapes which are not round enough are collected at the bottom of the flight.

Separators of this type may be used for removing weed seeds from the intended harvest, or to remove deformed lead shot.

== See also ==
- Sieve
- Screw conveyor
- Cyclone (separator)
- Mineral processing
- Mechanical screening
