= Variable rate feeder =

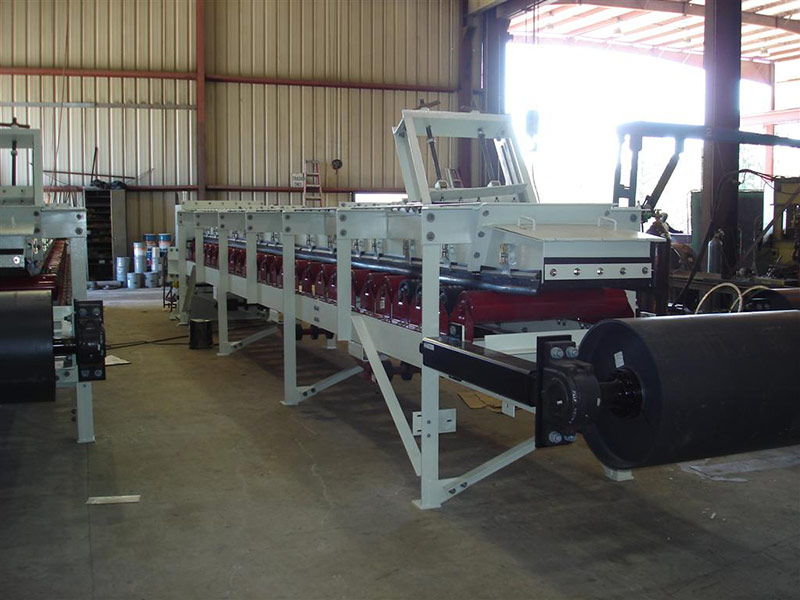
Custom made belt feeder to be used in a material handling capacity.

A variable rate feeder (often shortened to belt feeder, or simply feeder) is a piece of industrial control equipment used to deliver solid material at a known rate into some process.

== Belt feeders vs. belt conveyors ==
In both form and function, belt feeders are essentially short belt conveyors. There are a few key areas in which the two differ, however:

- Rate control: feeders are capable of rate control (meaning the rate at which they operate can be varied), while conveyors operate at a constant speed.
- Operational speed: feeders typically operate at slower speeds than belt conveyors.
- Flow patterns: feeders are flood-loaded (where all of the material in the bin is in motion during withdrawal), while belt conveyors are funnel-loaded (where some of the material in a bin moves while the rest remains stationary).

== Industries ==
- Mining / power generation. Due to rugged design and the ability to continuously move material in low-headroom situations, belt feeders have proven ideal for handling materials like coal and ore. This gentle and economical transportation has proven vital for both the mining and power generation industries.
- Bulk material handling. Belt feeders are typically used for handling fairly light, fine, abrasive, free flowing materials. Feeder units are typically placed under storage facilities such as silos, surge hoppers or load hoppers, and may be operated either horizontally or on an incline to save headroom. For such applications, belt width is governed by the size of the material being handled and required tons per hour.

== Transport mechanisms ==
A number of different techniques and transport mechanisms are used, but these broadly split into these categories, in descending order of accuracy:

- closed-loop feedback systems, where the output from some variable feeder is measured and the feed rate varied by a local control system ensuring the desired rate is maintained. To be noted that the dosing equipment can be a belt but can also be a screw conveyor, a twin screw conveyors or a vibrating tube
- volumetric feeders, such as screw conveyors, delivering a predictable volumetric feed, driven at a variable rate
- open loop systems where a feeder (e.g. a belt feeder) is driven at a given rate which has been established in advance
- open loop systems where a door or valve on a feed hopper is opened by a graduated amount, delivering an approximate rate of feed

Any of these may be combined with subsequent checks from beltweighers or (in the case of grains, powders and liquids) flowmeters to provide a more accurate flow of material.
