= Water pumping =

Movement of water

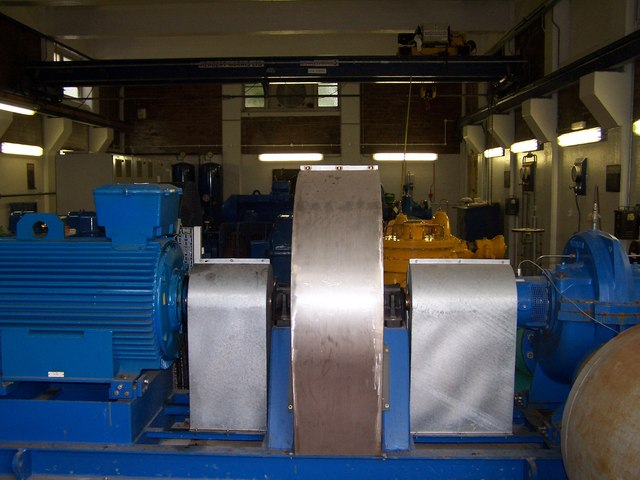
Interior of a water pumping station

The pumping of water is a basic and practical technique, far more practical than scooping it up with one's hands or lifting it in a hand-held bucket. This is true whether the water is drawn from a fresh source, moved to a needed location, purified, or used for irrigation, washing, or sewage treatment, or for evacuating water from an undesirable location. Regardless of the outcome, the energy required to pump water is an extremely demanding component of water consumption. All other processes depend or benefit either from water descending from a higher elevation or some pressurized plumbing system.

The ancient concept of the aqueduct took simple and eloquent advantage of maintaining elevation of water for as long and far a distance as possible. Thus, as water moves over great distances, it retains a larger component of its potential energy by spending small portions of this energy flowing down a slight gradation. A useful aqueduct system ultimately depends on a fresh water source existing at a higher elevation than the location where the water can be of use. Gravity does all the work. In all other instances, pumps are necessary.

In day-to-day situations, available water is often contaminated, unhealthy, or even naturally poisonous, so that it is necessary to pump potable water from lower levels to higher levels, where it can be of use. A fresh water source in a lower stream, river, pond, or lake is often pumped to higher ground for irrigation, livestock, cooking, cleaning or other uses by humans, who quite naturally need fresh water.

== Coil pump ==
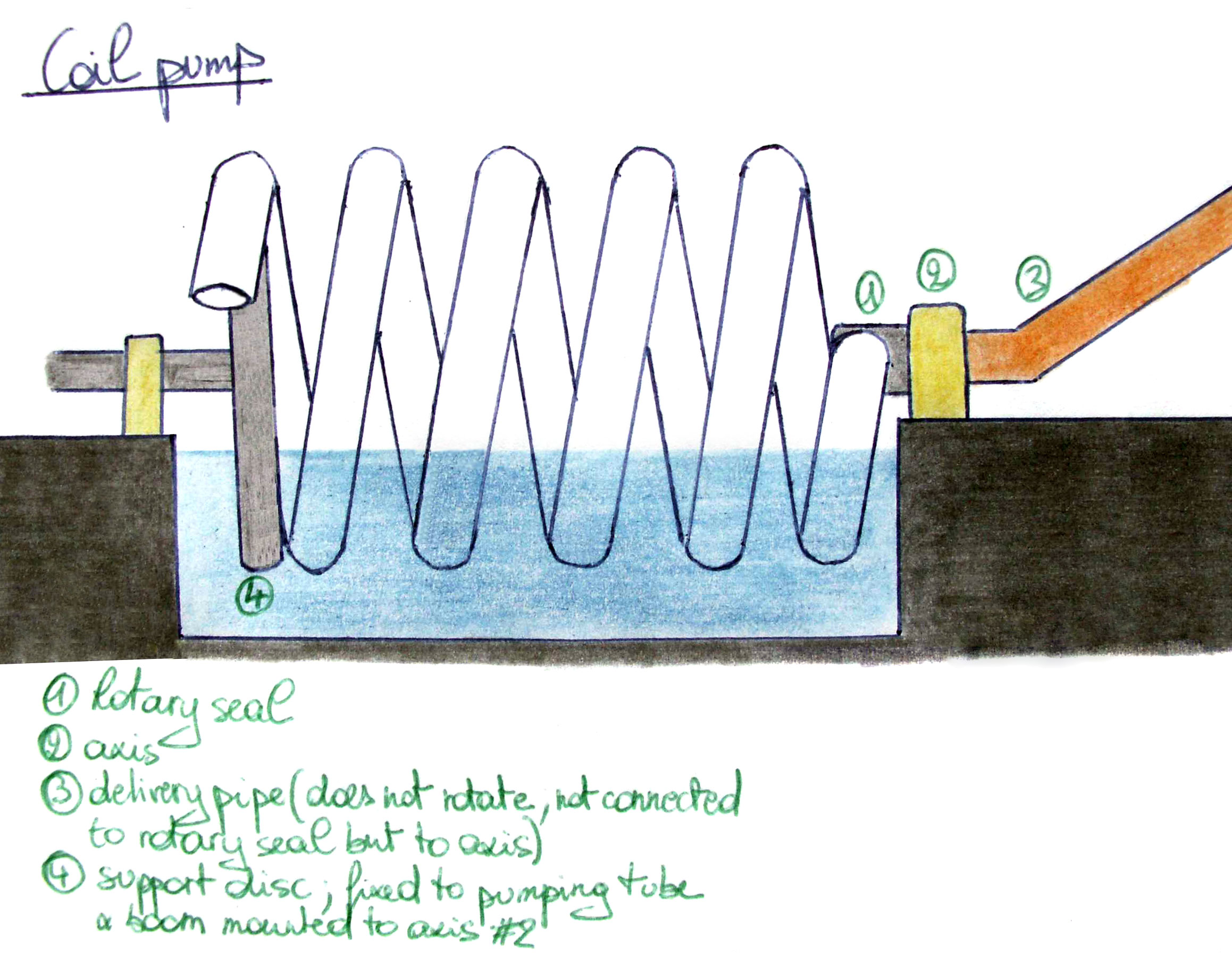
A coil pump

A coil pump is a low lift pump which is composed of a tube, shaped as a coil and mounted on a rotating axle powered by an engine or an animal capable of turning the axle around rapidly. Due to the rotation, water is then picked up by the tube and pumped upwards in the hose. The coil pump, as many low lift pumps, is commonly used for irrigation purposes and for drainage of lands. It is currently still used by farmers in Asia.

The coil pump was built as an alternative to the Archimedean screw. Unlike the Archimedean screw, it can run horizontally while the Archimedean screw is tilted at about 30°. The coil pump, if fitted with a suitable rotating seal, can deliver water to a greater height, typically 5-10m, above their discharge opening. Despite the emergence of new pumps that operate on other principles, the coil pump remains an important tool as some of it other benefits are that they can be built and repaired easily at a very low cost. This is possible as all the components can be built from local resources such as metal, which can be obtained and cast into the desired form easily.

However, as mentioned before, the pump only allows the lifting of water over a small height. This limitation makes it unsuitable for water drainage or irrigation over larger height differences or many other pumping applications besides drainage and irrigation.

== Spiral pump ==
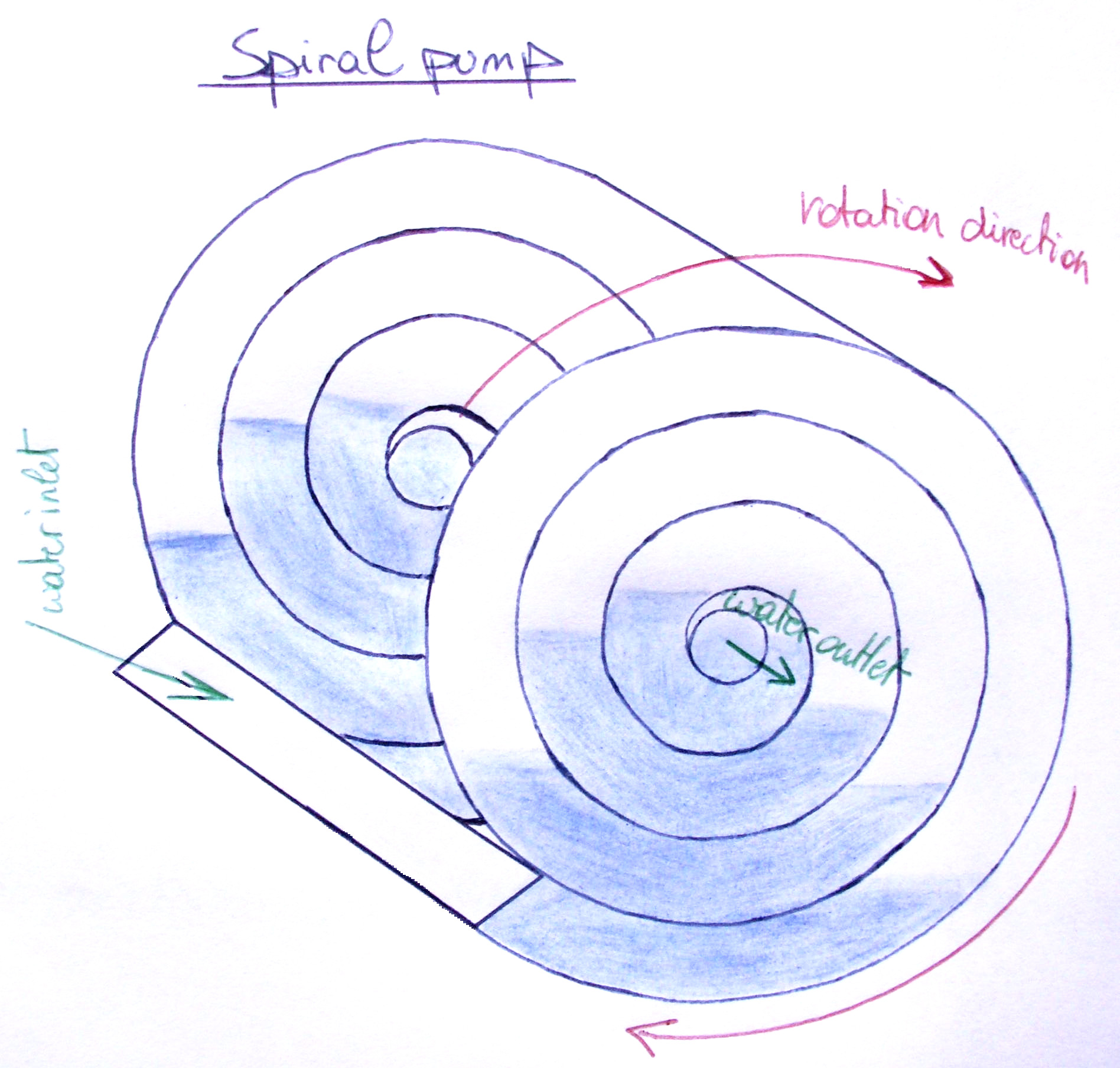
A spiral pump

A spiral pump, sometimes called a Wirtz pump (named after H.A. Wirtz) or incorrectly Wirz pump, is a low lift pump which is composed of a long piece of metal plating, which is wound into a coil and sealed at the top and back extremities so as to resemble a cylinder. The outer cavity serves as the inlet, while the inner (partial) tube serves as the outlet. A coiled plastic tube will suffice for this arrangement. The outlet pipe is fixed to a water wheel, engine or animal which is capable of rotating the pump quickly. Due to this rotation, water is picked up by the outer cavity and pumped upwards in the hose.

=== Applications ===
The spiral pump, as many low lift pumps, is commonly used for irrigation purposes and for drainage of lands. Based on the same principle as the Archimedean screw, it consists of a rotating tube or plane (screw) to move a liquid. Unlike the Archimedean screw, it can pump while horizontal. The Archimedean screw must be tilted at an angle. The spiral pump, if fitted with a suitable rotating seal, can deliver water to a greater height than the coil pump, typically 5-10m, above their discharge opening. Its main drawback is that the output is small - an output proportional to the volume of the largest coil being moved each revolution. Despite the emergence of new pumps that operate on other principles, the spiral pump remains an important tool as it can be built and repaired easily at a very low cost. This is possible as all the components can be built from local resources such as sheet metal bent into the desired form with or without machine tools.

=== Origins ===
The Zürich pewterer Andreas Wirz (often incorrectly referred to as Wirtz) invented the pump in 1746. The first published description and mechanical analysis was written by JH Ziegler twenty years later, in 1766, with Wirz' consent. Wirz' original pump was powered by a stream wheel in the Limmat river, to raise water for a dye house.

== See also ==
- Packaged pump station
- Tjasker
- Windpump
