= Hopper trailer =

Self unloading trailer for bulk products

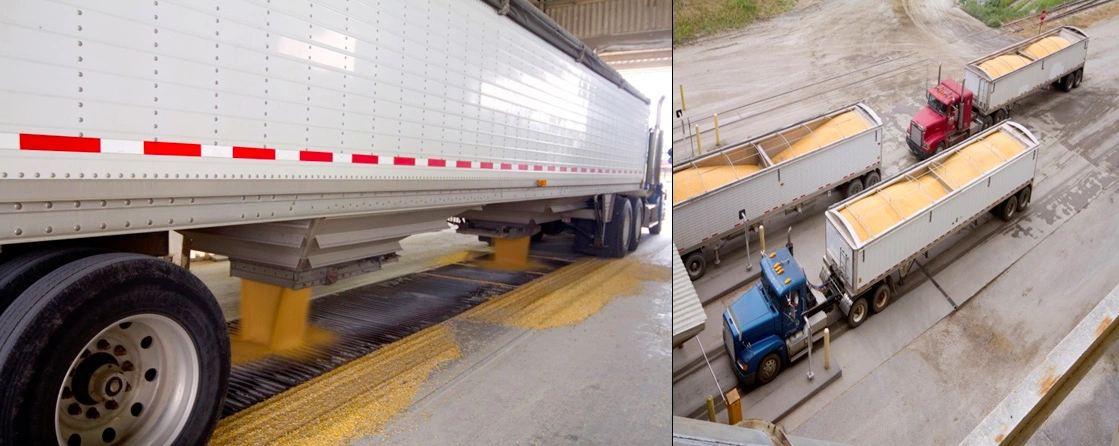
A grain hopper trailer

A hopper trailer is a trailer pulled by a semi tractor and used to haul bulk commodity products, such as grain. These trailers are used extensively throughout the United States to transport agricultural products as well as any other commodity that can be hauled in bulk and loaded and unloaded through the trailer.

== Design ==
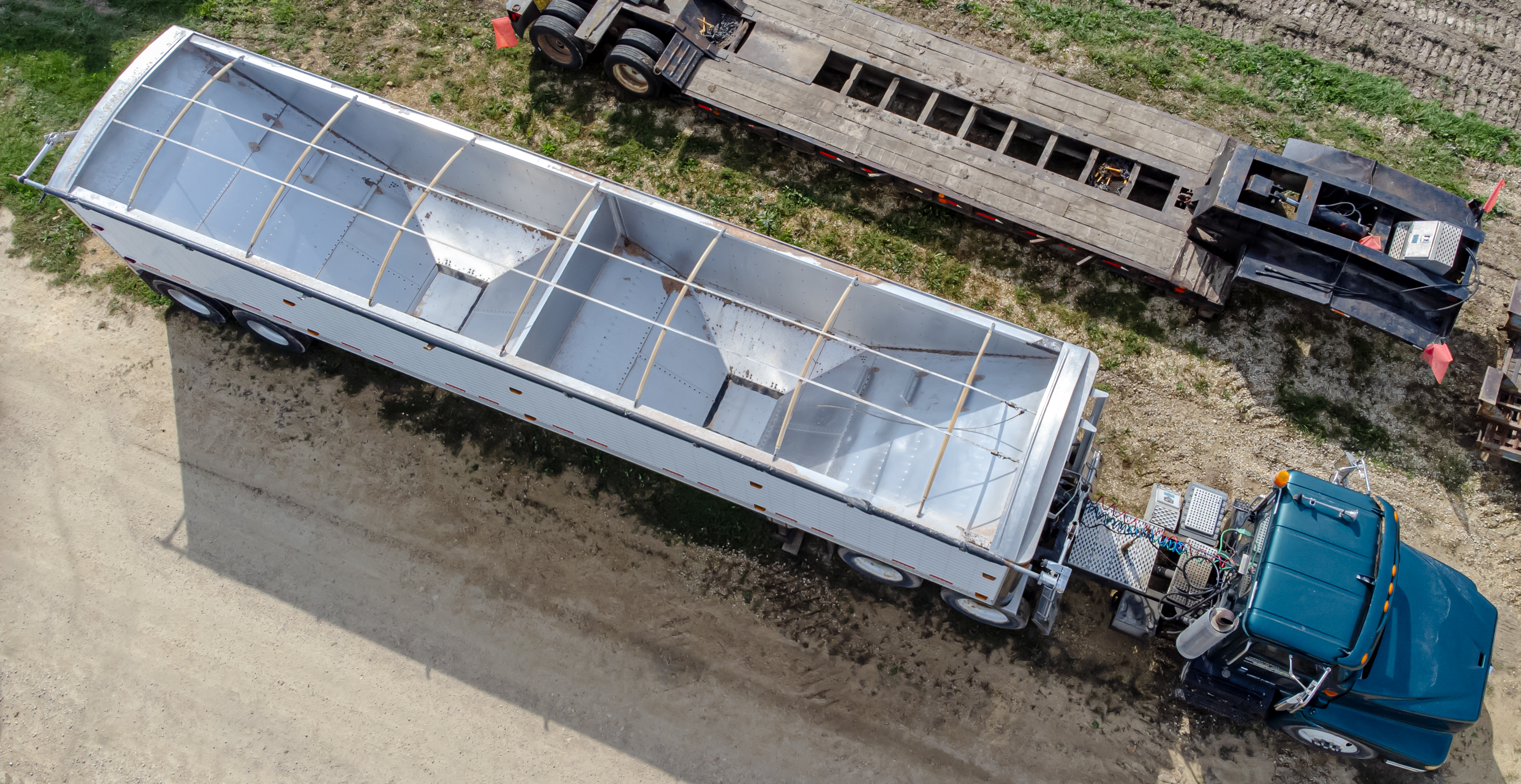
An empty grain hopper trailer

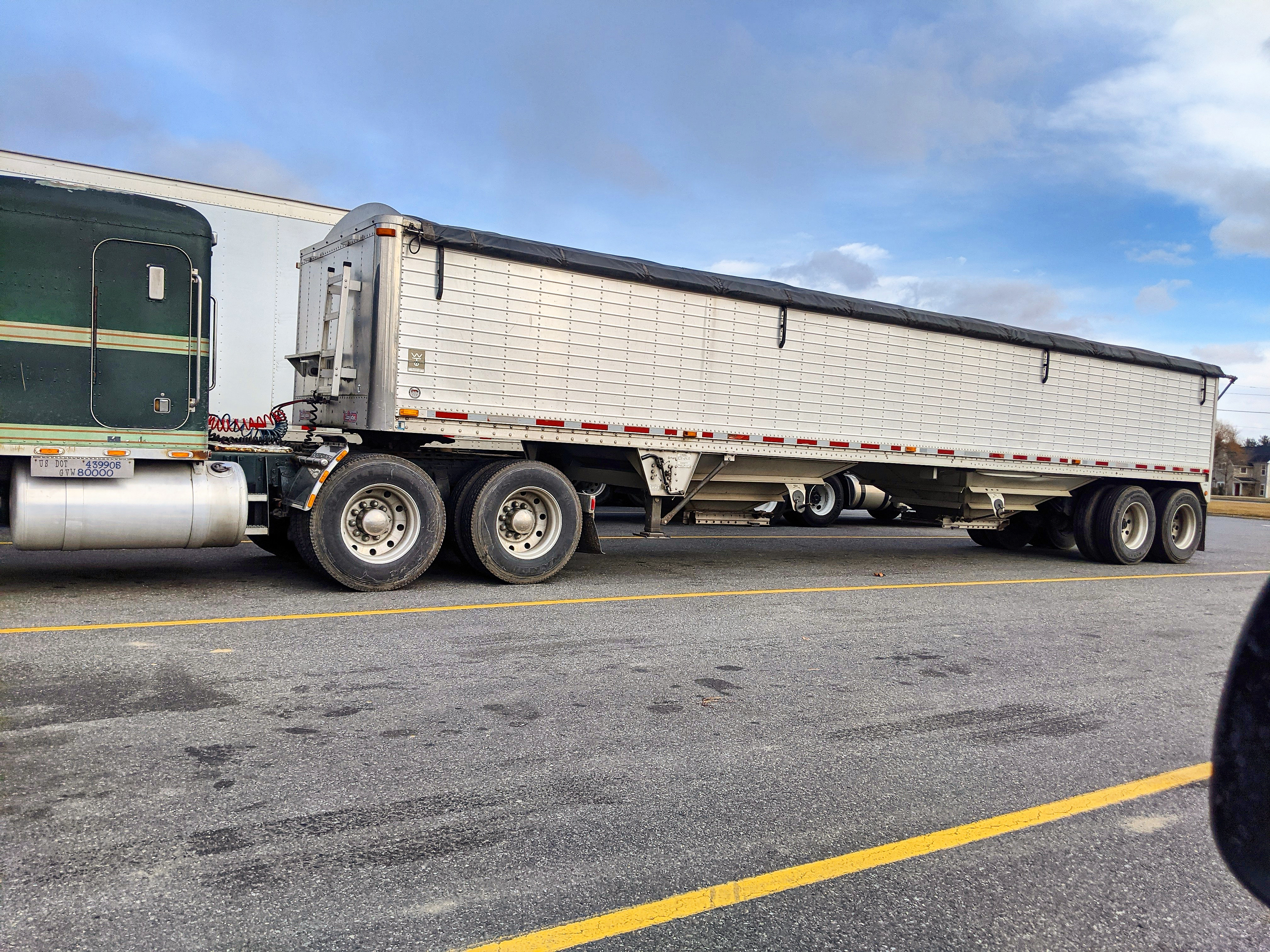
A hopper-bottom trailer in Salem County, New Jersey

Grain hopper or hopper-bottom trailers typically feature a rolling tarp on the top of the trailer, to enable easy loading of the product to be transported, and also offer protection during transport. They utilize two hoppers on the base of the trailer to unload to product, one servicing the rear half of the trailer, the other the front half. The output of these hoppers is usually controlled by a sliding plate on the base of the hopper, controlled by a user-operated crank handle.

== Usage ==
Grain cart to grain hopper trailer

A grain hopper trailer is used in conjunction with various other pieces of agricultural machinery to complete the harvest of a field. Combine harvesters or similar unload the harvest into grain carts, which in turn unload their load into a grain hopper trailer, for long-distance transportation. The trailers are then unloaded into low-profile grain augers for transportation to, and long-term storage in, grain bins, also known as silos.

== See also ==
- Combine harvester
- Grain elevator
- Grain bin
- Gravity wagon
- Hopper car
