= Scharsterbrug =

Scharsterbrug Skarsterbrêge
- Village
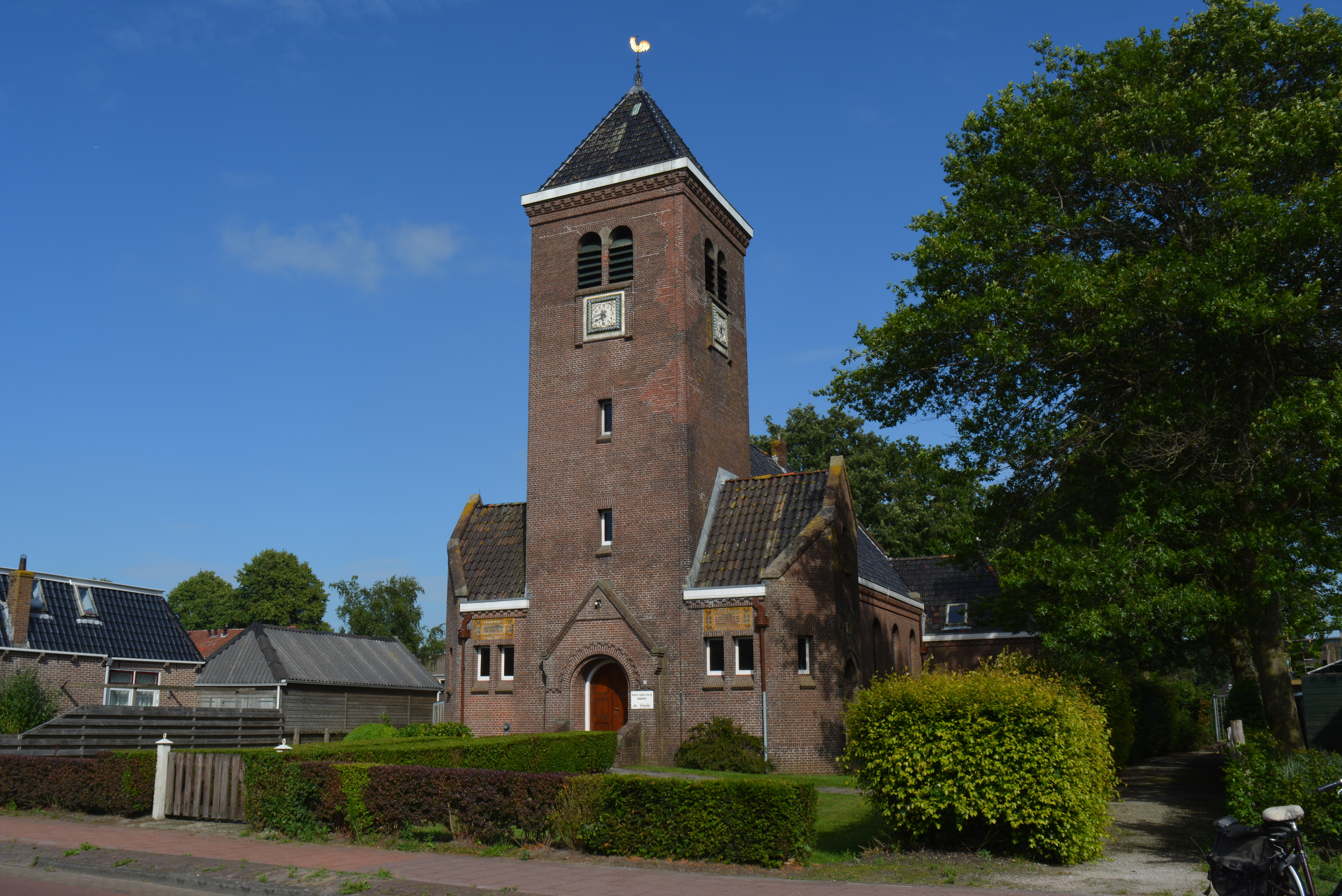
- Scharsterbrug church

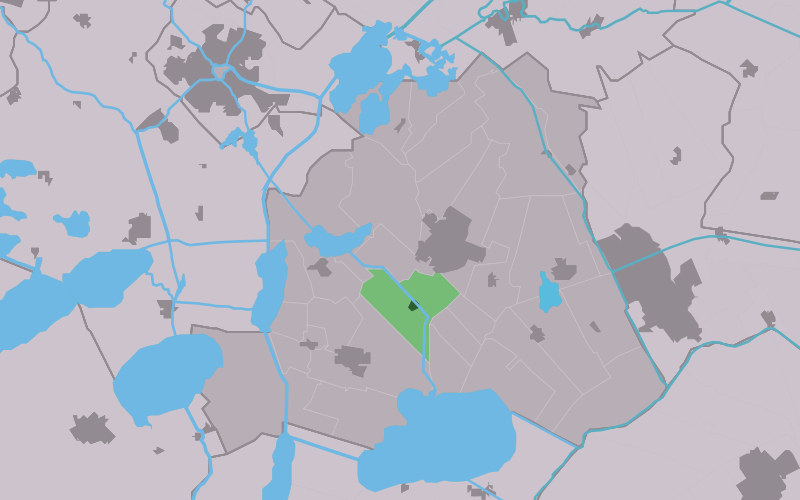
- Location in the former Skarsterlân municipality

- Location in the Netherlands Scharsterbrug (Netherlands)
- Country: Netherlands
- Province: Friesland
- Municipality: De Fryske Marren

Area
  - Total: 6.87 km^{2} (2.65 sq mi)
- Elevation: 0.0 m (0 ft)

Population (2021)
  - Total: 805
  - Density: 117/km^{2} (303/sq mi)
- Time zone: UTC+1 (CET)
  - Summer (DST): UTC+2 (CEST)
- Postal code: 8517
- Dialing code: 0513

Scharsterbrug (West Frisian: Skarsterbrêge) is a village in De Fryske Marren in the province of Friesland, the Netherlands. It had a population of around 830 in 2017.

There is a restored windmill, De Skarrenmolen.

== History ==
The village was first mentioned in 1847 as Scharsterbrug, and the means bridge over the canal running through the Scharren (communal ground). In 1580, the Scharsterrijn was dug for peat excavation in the Scharren. In 1840, it was home to 147 people. In 1911, a dairy factory was constructed and in 1914, a church was built. The Skarrenmoune is a polder mill which was probably built in 1881.

Before 2014, Scharsterbrug was part of the Skarsterlân municipality and before 1984 it was part of Doniawerstal.

== Gallery ==
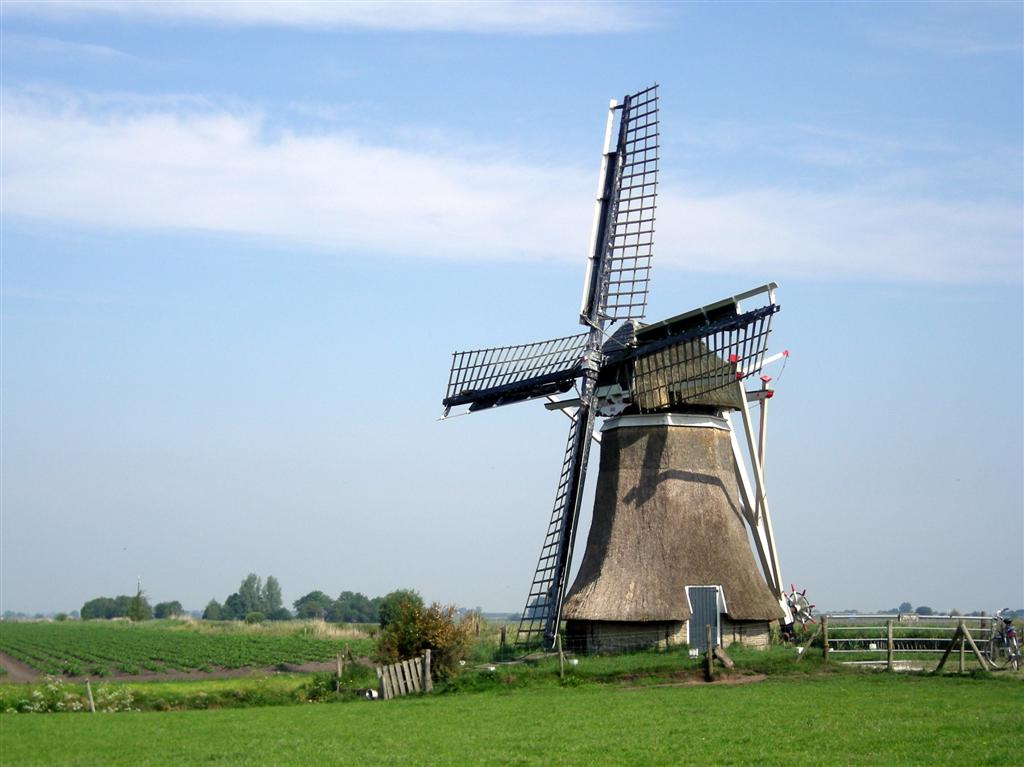
Skarrenmolen

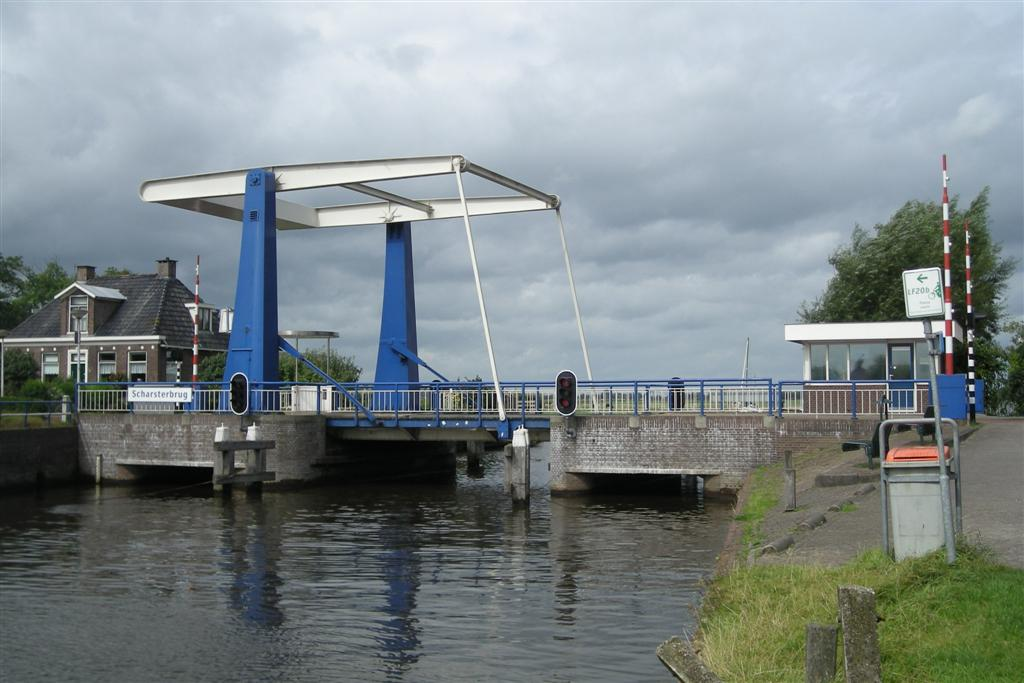
Bridge of Scharsterbrug
