= Chaser bin =

Type of trailer used in agricultural grain production

Grain cart to grain hopper trailer

Corn combine harvester unloading into grain cart

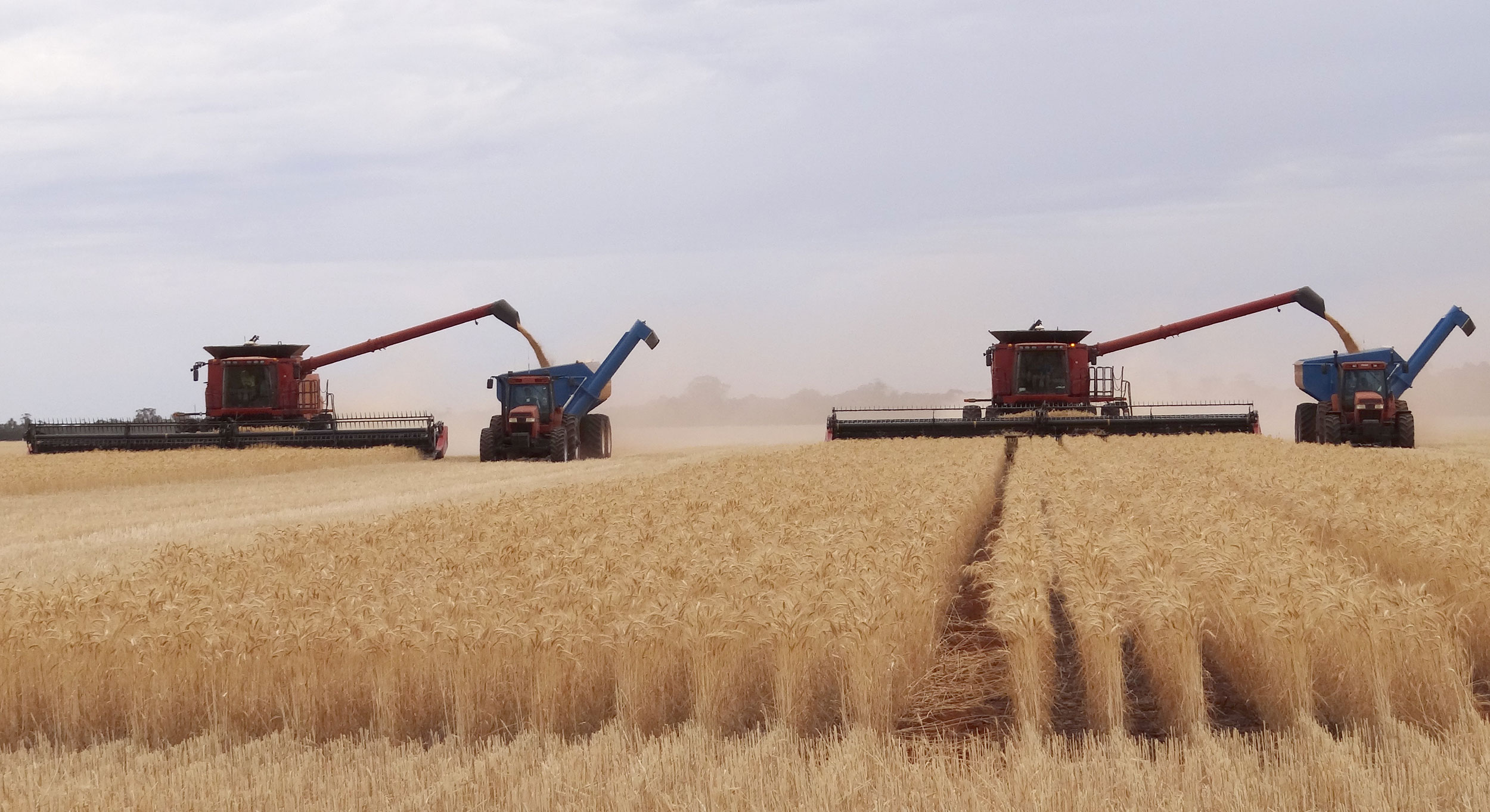
Two combines unloading into 2 chaser bins

A chaser bin, also called grain cart, bank out wagon or (grain) auger wagon, is a trailer towed by a tractor with a built-in auger conveyor system, usually with a large capacity (from several hundred to over 1000 bushels; around 15 tonnes (33,000 lb) is average).

== Design ==
The typical setup of a chaser bin is a cross auger, which feeds the folding unload auger, which in turn empties the contents into waiting Grain hopper trailers or mother bins.

In the past bins ranged in size, from 12T to 38T in most cases. Single axle bins usually can only handle a maximum of 20T of grain. Bins above a capacity of 20T, tend to feature a "walking beam" chassis. This chassis design features an independent axle setup, allowing the bin to smoothly travel across ditches and divots, as well as more easily access fields where the road is higher than the field level. It also allows the load to be evenly distributed along the length of the chassis, further reducing the risk of axle failure when traveling over rough terrain, particularly with a full bin.

The design of the bins usually follows the same pattern regardless of capacity, with smooth flowing curves to allow the grain to easily unload via the cross auger. This also helps prevent the grain sticking to the walls of the bin, preventing corrosion.

The cross auger is smaller than the main unload auger, which allows the unload auger to expel the grain at a constant rate. The bins can also feature cross auger cut-offs, which allow the operator to choke the feed rate to the unload auger if it starts struggling. Unload augers can empty a full bin in a matter of minutes, with 15" augers unloading at a rate of 6T per minute, and 19" augers unloading at 10T per minute.

== Usage ==
Chaser bins are typically used to transport harvested grain or corn over fields from a combine harvester to a waiting nearby truck which is used to cover larger distances over roads. The use of a chaser bin allows the harvester to operate continuously, eliminating the need to stop and unload. In contrast, trucks are kept off the field which eliminates the need to load their trailers with crops from the combine itself.

Most chaser bins are traditionally pulled by a tractor. These require tractors with large power outputs and are popular on the generally larger and more open fields of the United States and Australia, though usage in Europe is increasing. However, some chaser bins like the Holmer T430 tend to be more self-propelled.

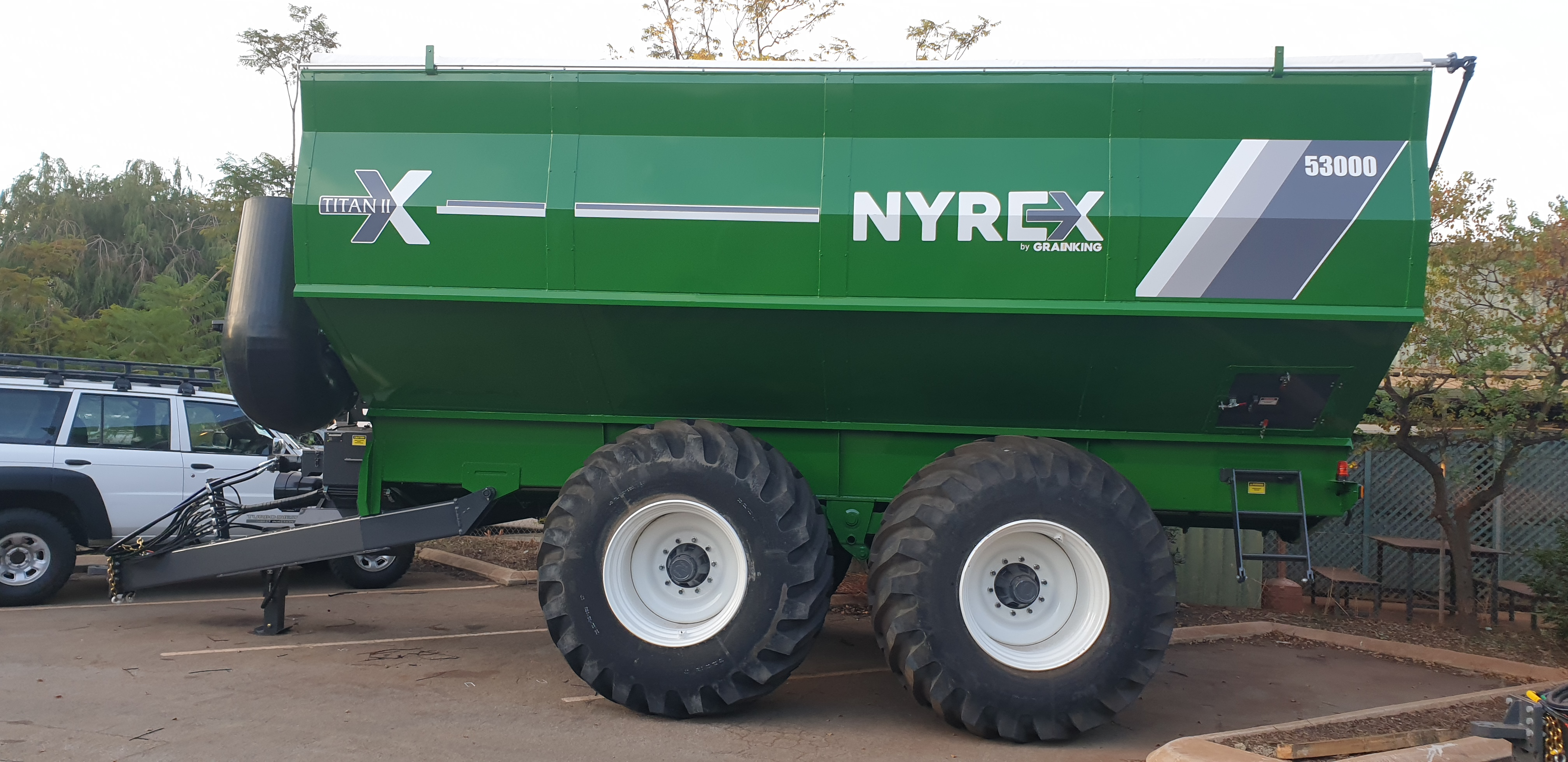
Grainking 42T - 53000L Grainking Titan II Chaser Bin

== Mother bins ==
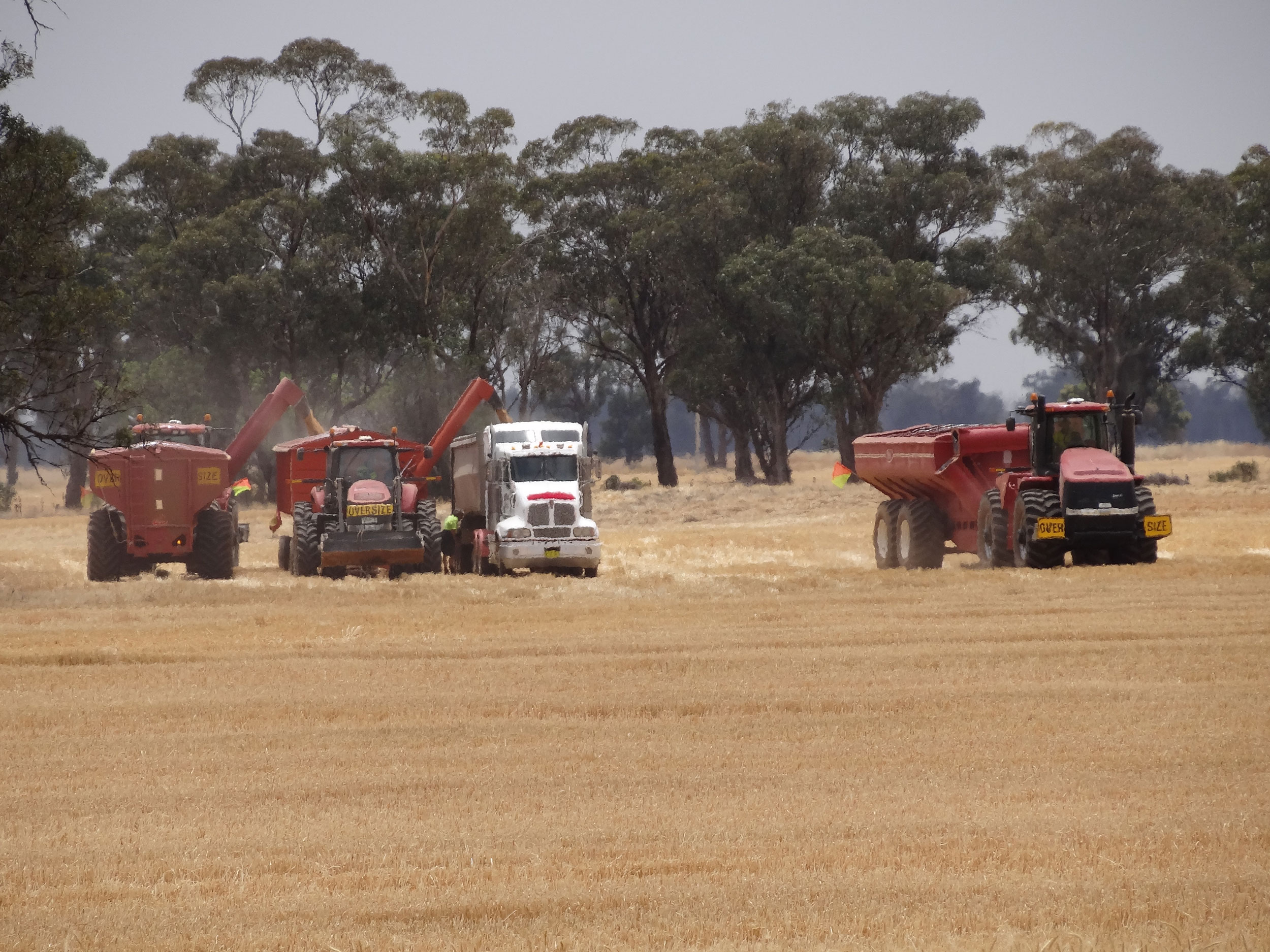
Mother bin as a static collection point

Mother bins, also known as "field bins" in Queensland, offer the farmer a convenient storage location while harvesting. In the past they had a capacity ranging from 55T to 130T, but modern mother bins have a much higher capacity. They are usually located on a paddock road at the entrance to the paddock being harvested, and allowing chaser bins to unload into them and offering truck drivers a more convenient location to fill grain into their semi-trailers. This also assists in reducing unnecessary soil compaction, by reducing the number of road trains on a given paddock.

Mother bins are not to be confused with chaser bins. Although they both hold and unload grain in the same manner, mother bins, are not designed to be used as chaser bins. They are only to be moved when empty, or if needed at a maximum of 25% full on smooth terrain only. They are designed to be a static collection point only.

== Efficiency and advantages of using chaser bins ==
Chaser bins provide several advantages in modern agriculture by optimizing grain transportation and minimizing downtime during harvest. They allow continuous combine operation, reducing waiting time for grain unloading. Additionally, using a chaser bin helps prevent soil compaction by reducing the need for fully loaded grain trucks to drive directly into the field.

Modern chaser bins are designed with high unloading speed - some models can empty 10 tonnes of grain per minute, ensuring efficient transfer to transport vehicles. Features such as hydraulic auger control and large flotation tires further enhance their usability in various field conditions.

== See also ==
- Gravity wagon
