= Screw conveyor =

Device to move liquid or granular materials

Archimedes' screw

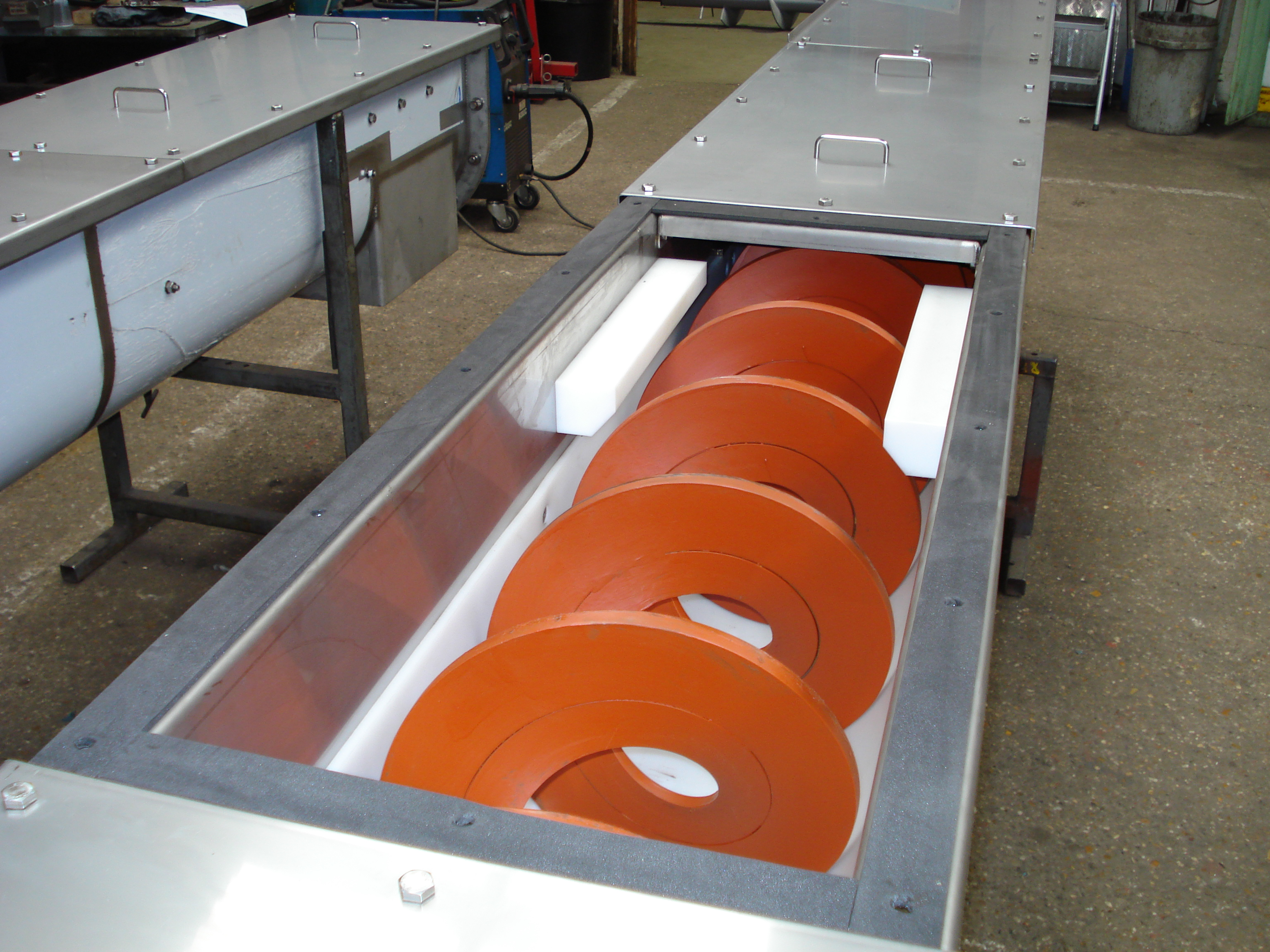
Centreless screw conveyor

A screw conveyor or auger conveyor is a mechanism that uses a rotating helical screw blade, called a "flighting", usually within a tube, to move liquid or granular materials. They are used in many bulk handling industries. Screw conveyors in modern industry are often used horizontally or at a slight incline as an efficient way to move semi-solid materials, including food waste, wood chips, aggregates, cereal grains, animal feed, boiler ash, meat, bone meal, municipal solid waste, and many others. The first type of screw conveyor was the Archimedes' screw, used since ancient times to pump irrigation water.

They usually consist of a trough or tube containing either a spiral blade coiled around a shaft, driven at one end and held at the other, or a "shaftless spiral", driven at one end and free at the other. The rate of volume transfer is proportional to the rotation rate of the shaft. In industrial control applications, the device is often used as a variable rate feeder by varying the rotation rate of the shaft to deliver a measured rate or quantity of material into a process.

Screw conveyors can be operated with the flow of material inclined upward. When space allows, this is a very economical method of elevating and conveying. As the angle of inclination increases, the capacity of a given unit rapidly decreases.

The rotating part of the conveyor is sometimes called simply an auger.

== In agriculture ==
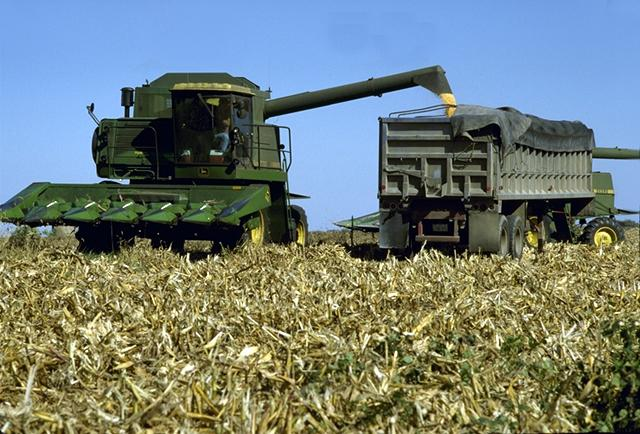
This combine harvester uses a screw conveyor within the tube to discharge grain into the trailer alongside

A screw conveyor moving grape stems away from wine grapes after they've been destemmed. In vertical deployment, the linear force is upwards, but portions of the circular motion point downward, at a slight gradient. Function depends on the material transported resisting downward flow.

The "grain auger" is used in agriculture to move grain from trucks, grain carts, or grain trailers into grain storage bins (from where it is later removed by gravity chutes at the bottom). A grain auger may be powered by an electric motor; a tractor, through the power take-off; or sometimes an internal combustion engine mounted on the auger. The helical rotates inside a long metal tube, moving the grain upwards. On the lower end, a hopper receives grain from the truck or grain cart. A chute on the upper end guides the grain into the destination location.

First Grain Auger invented in 1945 in Toronto, Canada

The modern grain auger of today's farming communities was invented by Peter Pakosh. His grain mover employed a screw-type auger with a minimum of moving parts, a totally new application for this specific use. At Massey Harris (later Massey Ferguson), young Pakosh approached the design department in the 1940s with his auger idea, but was scolded and told that his idea was unimaginable and that once the auger aged and bent that the metal on metal would, according to a head Massey designer, "start fires all across Canada". Pakosh, however, went on to design and build a first prototype auger in 1945, and 8 years later start selling tens of thousands under the 'Versatile' name, making it the standard for modern grain augers.

A specialized form of grain auger is used to transfer grain into a seed drill and is usually quite a lot smaller in both length and diameter than the augers used to transfer grain to or from a truck, grain cart or bin. This type of auger is known as a "drill fill". Grain augers with a small diameter, regardless of the use they are put to, are often called "pencil augers".

Centerless augers are particularly popular in industrial animal farming facilities, where the primary application is distributing animal feed from a central storage location to individual or group feeding devices. The flexible nature of the auger wire allows feed or other materials to change elevation and move at angles. The first centerless auger was patented by Eldon Hostetler and Chore-Time Equipment in the context of this application.

== Other uses ==
Various other applications of the screw or auger conveyor include its use in snowblowers, to move snow towards an impeller, where it is thrown into the discharge chute. Combine harvesters use both enclosed and open augers to move the unthreshed crop into the threshing mechanism and to move the grain into and out of the machine's hopper. Ice resurfacers use augers to remove loose ice particles from the surface of the ice. An auger is also a central component of an injection molding machine. An auger is used in some rubbish compactors to push the rubbish into a lowered plate at one end for compaction.

Augers are also present in food processing. They are a tool of choice in powder processing when it comes to conveyor does precisely bulk solids (powders, pellets...). In a conventional meat grinder, chunks of meat are led by the auger through a spinning blade and a holed plate. This method emulsifies the fat in beef to soften hamburger patties and is also used to produce a wide variety of sausages and loaves. Augers are also used to force food products through dies to produce pellets. These are then processed further to produce products such as bran flakes.

Augers are also used in oil fields as a method of transporting rock cuttings away from the shakers to skips. Augers are also used in some types of pellet stoves and barbecue grills, to move fuel from a storage hopper into the firebox in a controlled manner. Augers are often used in machining, wherein the machine tools may include an auger to direct the swarf (scrap metal or plastic) away from the workpiece.

Screw conveyors can also be found in wastewater treatment plants to evacuate solid waste from the treatment process.

The amphibious infantry fighting vehicle BMP-3 uses an auger-type propulsion unit in water.

== Olds elevator ==
The Olds elevator is a variant of a screw conveyor developed by Australian engineer Peter Olds in 2002. Rather than rotate a central screw blade, a stationary screw is contained within a rotating casing that scoops surrounding material into its base. Following similar principles to the conventional screw conveyor, the Olds elevator can lift bulk materials efficiently. Since its invention, it has been assessed as a viable system for industrial uses by a number of academics.

== See also ==
- Spiral separator
- Screw-propelled vehicle
- Archimedes' screw
