= Trickle valve =

Type of airlock

Trickle valves, also known as vacuum valves, are commonly used in industrial dust collection applications to maintain an airlock seal on a dust collector hopper while allowing bulk solid material to be automatically discharged. These valves are typically a less expensive alternative to more commonly used rotary airlocks. Unlike rotary airlock valves which are driven by either an electric motor or a gas or air-powered motor, trickle valves require no external power source.

== Operation ==
Trickle valves can be used only on systems operating under negative pressure. The vacuum created inside the dust collector holds the valve closed, allowing a head of material to build up above the trickle valve. Once the pressure of the material equals the negative pressure of the system, the valve is forced open and a trickle of material will begin flowing from the valve at the same rate it is collected. The magnitude of the vacuum of the system and the bulk density of the material being handled determine how much material will build up before the valve begins to discharge. Because trickle valves work automatically and require no power source or controls, they have very low initial cost and virtually no operating cost.

== Design ==
A well designed trickle valve has few or no moving parts. Most trickle valves are also adjustable as to how much vacuum pressure it takes to operate. Adjustments are typically made with a weighted counterbalance or an adjustable leaf spring. Because these valves have no way to force clogs through, they are only recommended for use with dry and relatively dense, free-flowing materials such as sand, fly ash, and cement.

== Types ==
=== Duckbill sleeve type ===
This type of trickle valve utilizes a specially designed duckbill rubber sleeve. The negative pressure of the dust collection system collapses the sleeve on itself, creating an airtight seal. Adjustable leaf springs are inserted into the sides of the sleeve which help to resist the vacuum. The weight of collected material above the valve forces the sleeve open to allow a steady discharge. Duckbill sleeve trickle valves have no moving parts.

=== Trap door type ===
Trap door trickle valves have one moving part, a hinged flap plate to maintain a seal between the hopper and the discharge. This type of valve is adjusted with an external weighted counterbalance or it is not adjustable. Greased bearings are required for smooth operation of the flap plate’s hinge.

== See also ==
- Cyclonic separator
