= Rotary feeder =

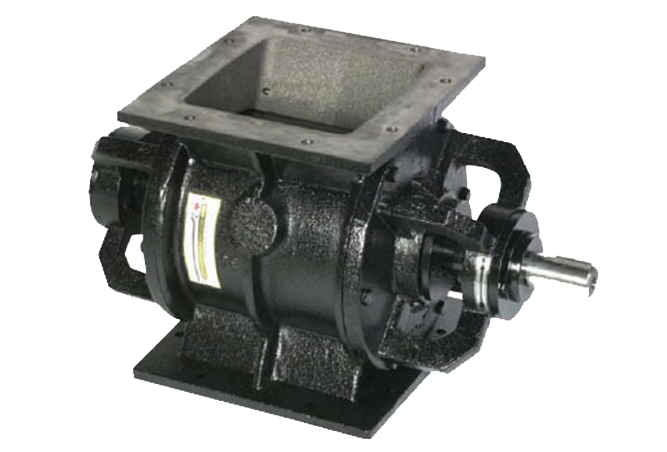
Meyer Heavy Duty Rotary Airlock Valve

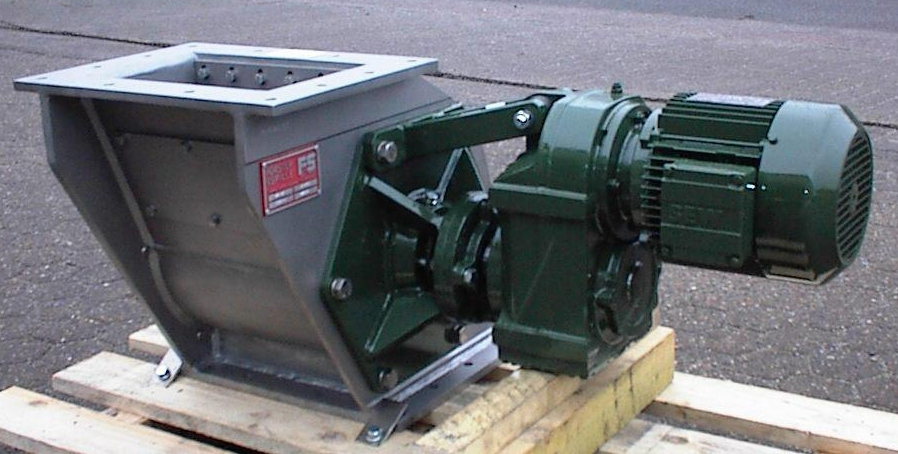

Rotary feeders, also known as rotary airlocks or rotary valves, are commonly used in industrial and agricultural applications as a component in a bulk or specialty material handling system. Rotary feeders are primarily used for discharge of bulk solid material from hoppers/bins, receivers, and cyclones into a pressure or vacuum-driven pneumatic conveying system. Components of a rotary feeder include a rotor shaft, housing, head plates, and packing seals and bearings. Rotors have large vanes cast or welded on and are typically driven by small internal combustion engines or electric motors.

== Use ==
Rotary airlock feeders have wide application in industry wherever dry free-flowing powders, granules, crystals, or pellets are used. Typical materials include: cement, ore, sugar, minerals, grains, plastics, dust, fly ash, flour, gypsum, lime, coffee, cereals, pharmaceuticals, etc.

Industries that utilize this type include cement, asphalt, chemicals, mining, plastics, and food processing, among others.

Rotary feeders are ideal for pollution control applications in wood, grain, food, textile, paper, tobacco, rubber, and paint industries, the Standard Series works beneath dust collectors and cyclone separators even with high temperatures and different pressure differentials.

Rotary valves are available with square or round inlet and outlet flanges. Housing can be fabricated out of sheet material or cast. Common materials are cast iron, carbon steel, 304 SS, 316 SS, and other materials. Rotary airlock feeders are often available in standard and heavy duty models, the difference being the head plate and bearing configuration. Heavy duty models use an outboard bearing in which the bearings are moved out away from the head plate. Housing inlet and discharge configurations are termed drop-thru or side entry. Various wear protections are available such as hard chrome or ceramic plating applied to the inner housing surfaces. Grease and air purge fittings are often provided to prevent contaminants from entering the packing seals.

Airlock-type rotary valves function as isolation devices in the event of a fire or deflagration inside the processing facility. They do not put out fires, but by sealing off the flow of air and material, they may slow down or prevent flames from spreading further down the conveying line.

In order to function properly as isolation devices, the NFPA requires certain features in rotary airlock valves, including a 0.0079’’ clearance between the rotor and housing, specific materials of construction, and eight or more rotor vanes.

== Uses ==
- Rotary airlock

The basic use of the rotary airlock feeder is as an airlock transition point, sealing pressurized systems against loss of air or gas while maintaining a flow of material between components with different pressure and suitable for air lock applications ranging from gravity discharge of filters, rotary valves, cyclone dust collectors, and rotary airlock storage devices to precision feeders for dilute phase and continuous dense phase pneumatic convey systems. (More on this in “How airlocks work in a conveying system.”)

- Rotary valve

Rotary airlock feeders and valves are utilized in pneumatic conveying systems, dust control devices, and for regulating volumetric feed.

- Volumetric feeder

Rotary airlock valves are commonly used as volumetric feeders to control the precise flow of materials from bins, hoppers, or silos to conveying or processing systems.

Airlock applications include gravity discharge of filters, rotary valves, cyclone dust collectors, and rotary airlock storage devices, as well as precision feeders for dilute phase and continuous dense phase pneumatic conveying systems.

== Types ==
=== Angle of Repose rotary Feeders ===
ARF is a variable speed rotary feeder designed to handle bulk materials, working smoothly with the material's natural flow. The ARF, using a rotating member and articulable gate, controls the volume of material flow based on the material's inherent angle of repose. The speed of rotation and the positioning of the articulable gate provides a consistent feed of your material. Drum rotation allows the material to be gently fed without retarding material flow, while minimizing surge loading, product degradation, dust generation and maintaining uniformity of material flow.

=== Rotary airlock feeders ===
Drop through rotary airlock feeders are designed for rugged applications that require an outboard bearing style unit where contamination and /or an abrasive product cannot be handled with an inboard bearing style. The outboard bearing feeders is engineered for use in high pressure pneumatic conveying systems, with high temperatures where more of an effective seal is required due to high or excessive wear that is experienced with a simple dust collector.

=== Blow-thru rotary airlock feeder ===
The blow-thru rotary airlock feeder is ideal for pneumatic conveying applications in food, grain, chemical, milling, baking, plastics and pharmaceutical industries. The blow-thru airlocks feature a low profile with large capacity. High pressure differentials integral mounting feet, and retrofit competitive units. The blow-thru valves are available with 10-vane open-end rotor; outboard bearings and replaceable shaft seals.

=== Rotary airlock feeder degassing ===
Rotary airlock feeders are very often installed to dose material in a pneumatic conveying line. As a consequence, a lot of gas coming from the conveying line is brought upstream by the rotation of the valve and the leakages in between the rotor and the stator. To ensure a smooth material flow and a well-functioning system, a small hopper with a filter is often connected to the feeder. This setup allows the air to be vented, while the product is efficiently fed into the valve.

=== Easy clean rotary feeder ===
The easy-clean series rotary feeders can be fast and simply disassembled, thoroughly quick cleaned, sanitized and inspected or maintenance in a minimum amount of time without the use of tools or removal from service, thereby reducing downtime and increasing system production. Reassembly without tools is accomplished in minutes. Internal clearances are automatically re-established every time.

The Clean-in-place rotary feeder is a special purpose valve designed for where cross-contamination is a major concern and lengthy shut-downs for clean-out are cost-prohibitive, suited for Dairy, Pharmaceutical industries, Food, Baking, Chemical, Plastics, Paint, and Powder Coating plants.

It is ideal for batch mixing systems such as those handling different colored resins which demand regular cleaning between cycles.

=== Filter valve ===
The filter valve is a low-cost solution designed for light duty dust collector applications.

=== Knife rotary feeder ===
This type of feeder is used for discharge of secondary fuel as for example: plastics or wood. The knife is cutting the oversize material and is preventing the rotor from blockage.
