= Gravity wagon =

Type of hopper that unloads when a door at the bottom of one side is opened

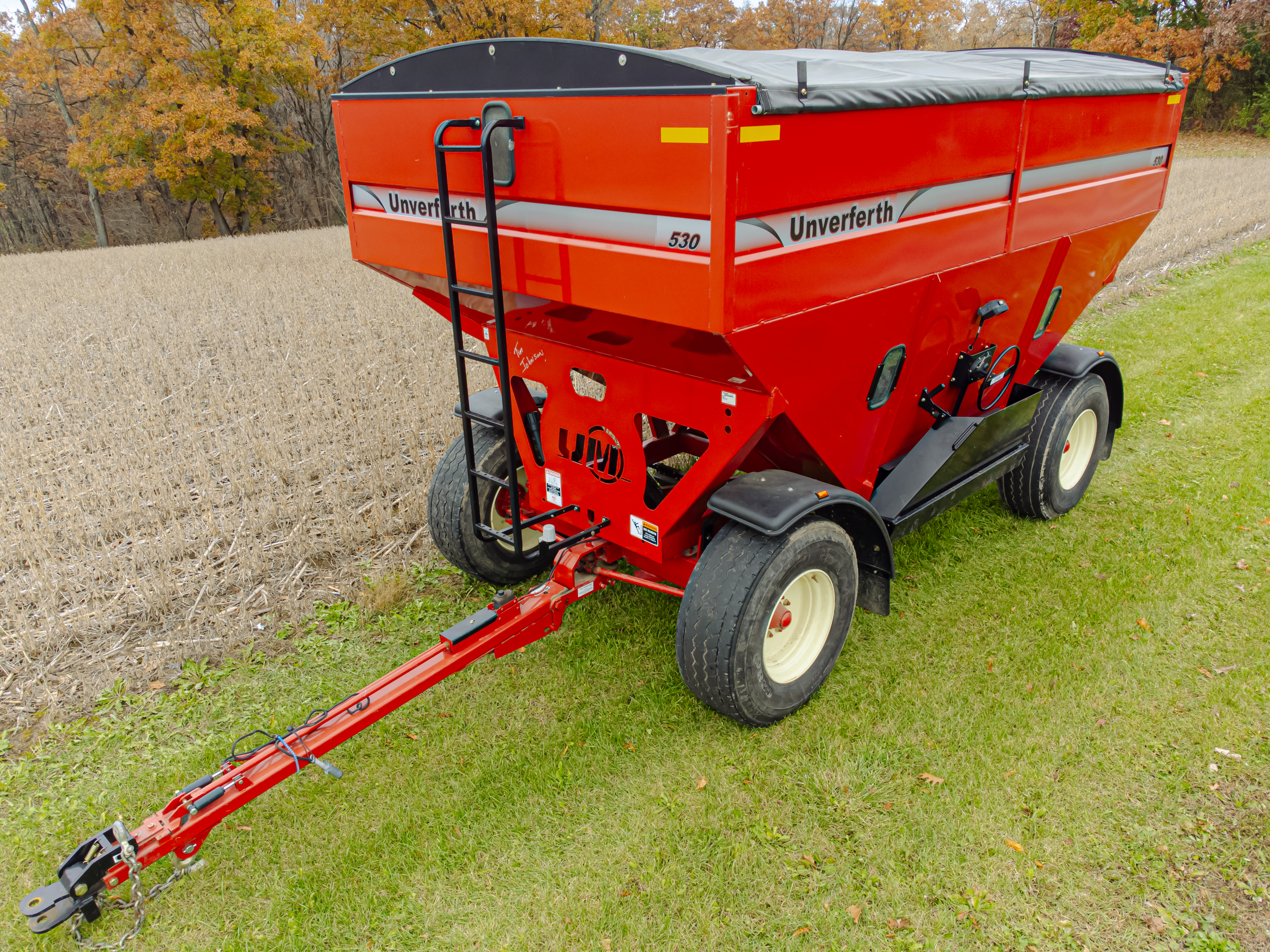
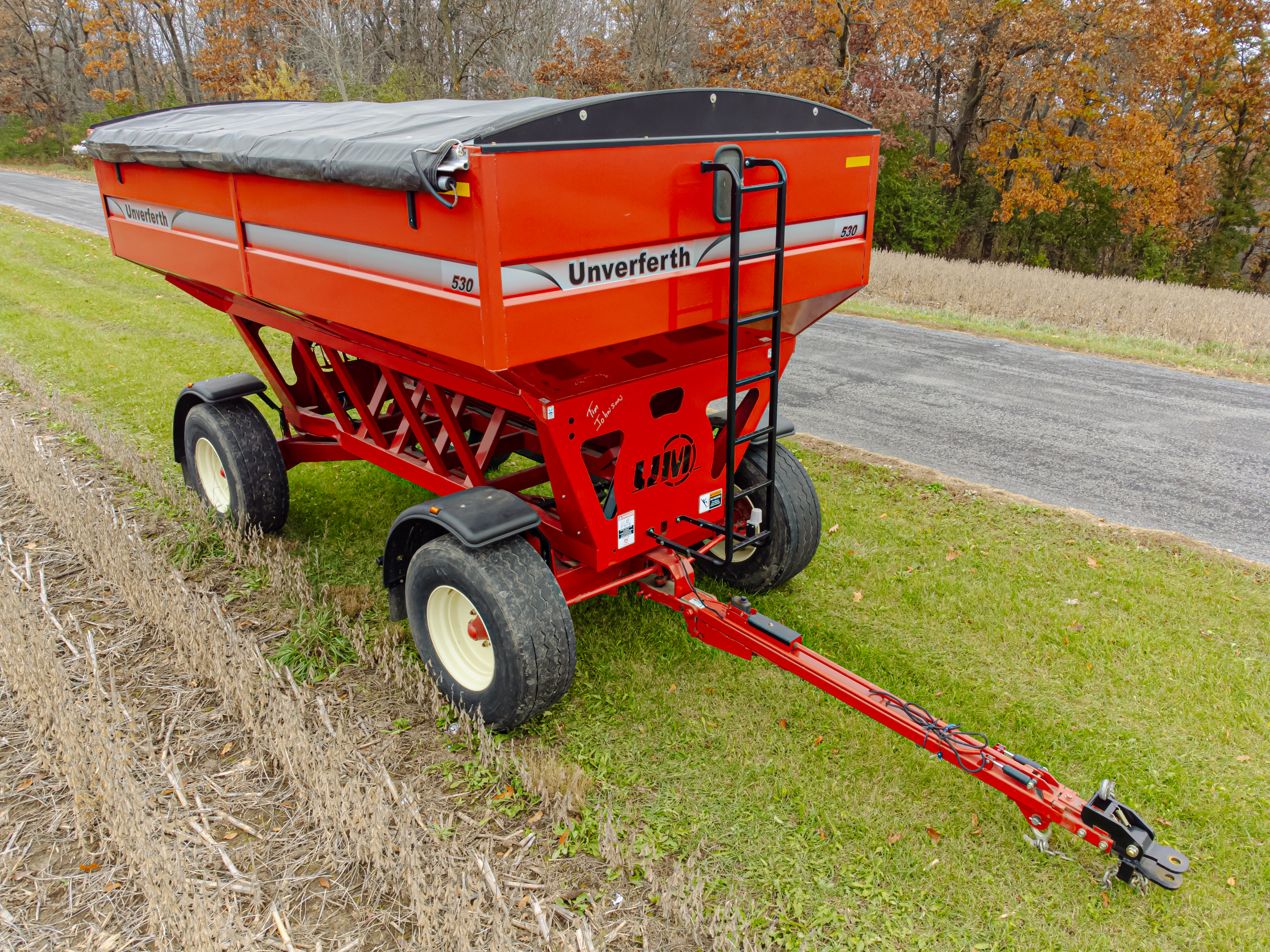
The gravity wagon slopes to one side so the grain can slide out that side

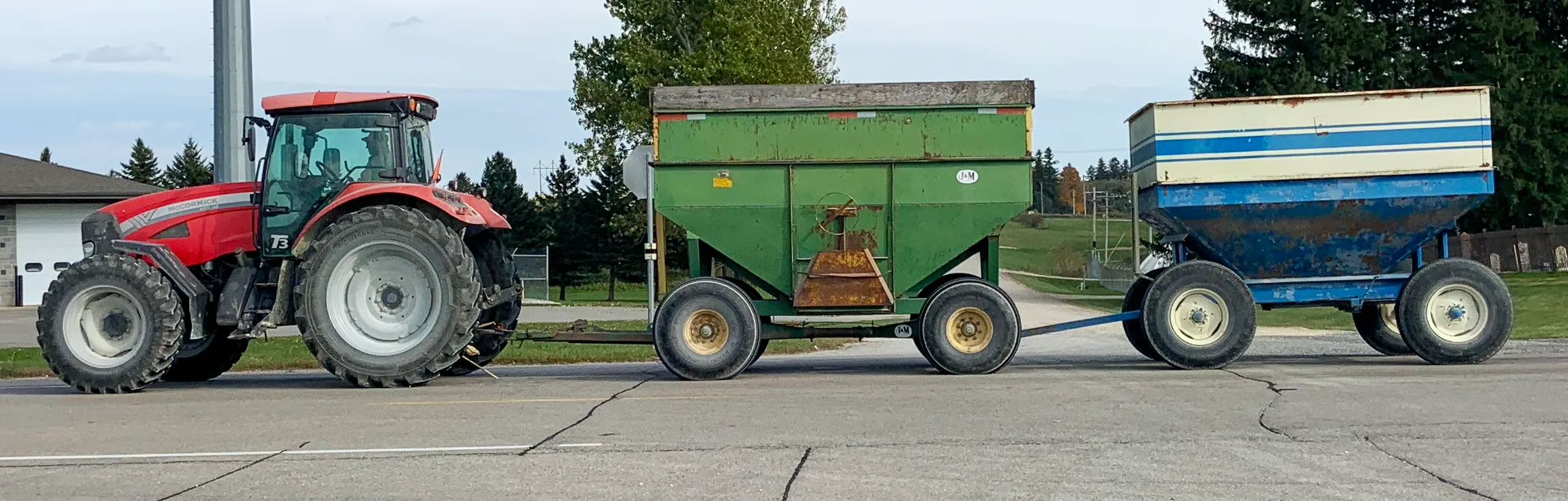
Gravity wagon being pulled in tandem

The gravity wagon, or slant wagon, is an angled hopper style wagon that utilizes gravity to make the unloading process easier. It is primarily used on farms for agricultural purposes, such as for holding crops or fertilizer. For easy comparison, it is similar to a railroad hopper car, only with one door which is located on the bottom side rather than on the bottom center.

== Description ==
A gravity wagon has three sides which are angled at about 45 degrees and one side that is vertical. An unloading door is located at the bottom of the vertical side where the three angled sides come together. This design causes the contents of the wagon to funnel towards the door so that no effort has to be put forth to unload the contents other than opening the door, which opens upwards by the action of a lever or turning of a wheel.

The chassis used for gravity wagons is sometimes the same as the chassis used for hay wagons.

== See also ==
- Forage wagon – Four wheeled vehicle (mostly pulled by draft animals)
- Grain hopper trailer
- Combine harvester – Machine that harvests grain crops
