= List of agricultural machinery =

Agricultural equipment is any kind of machinery used on a farm to help with farming. The best-known example of this kind is the tractor.

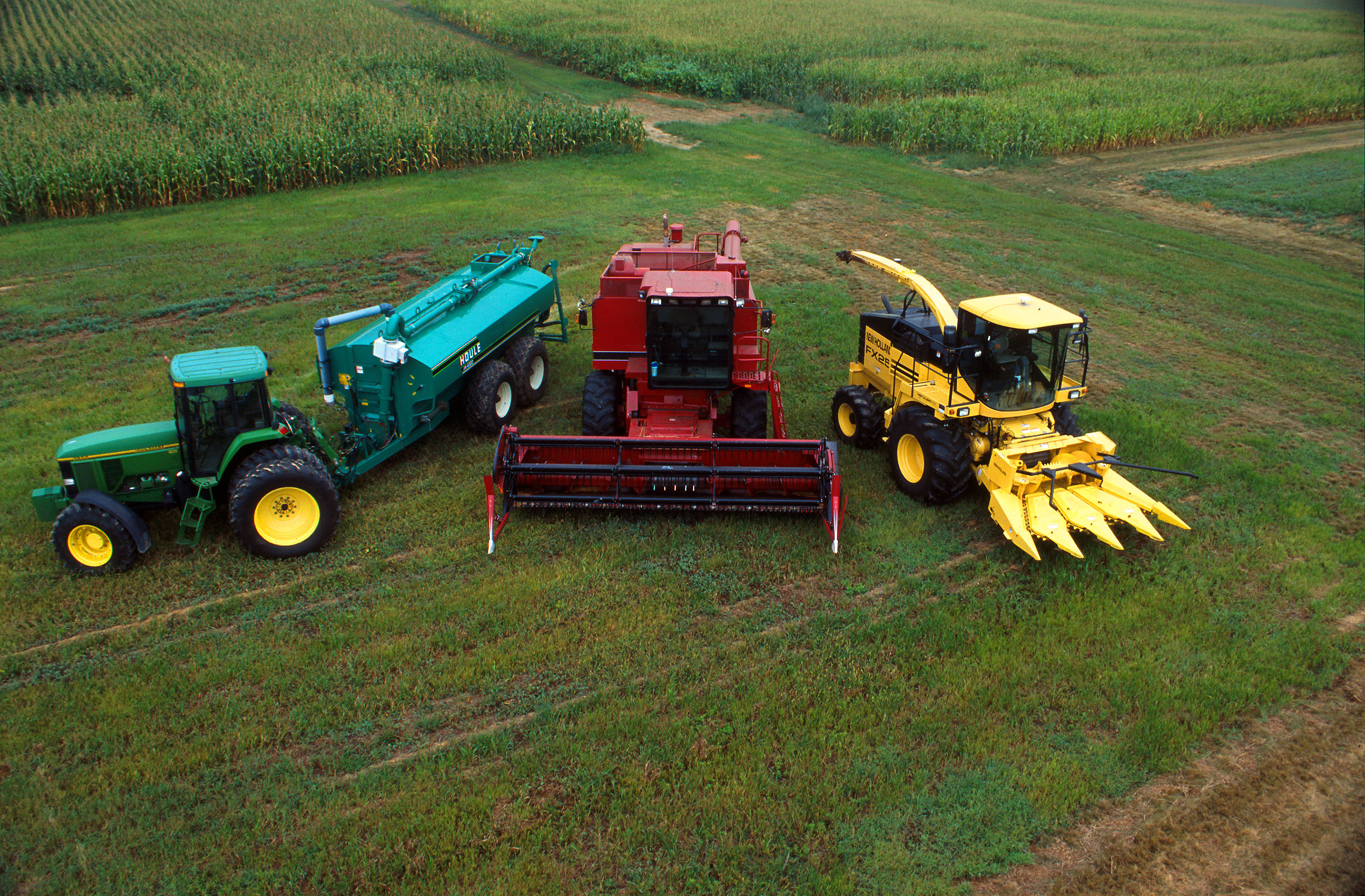
From left to right: John Deere 7800 tractor with Houle slurry trailer, Case IH combine harvester, New Holland FX 25 forage harvester with corn head.

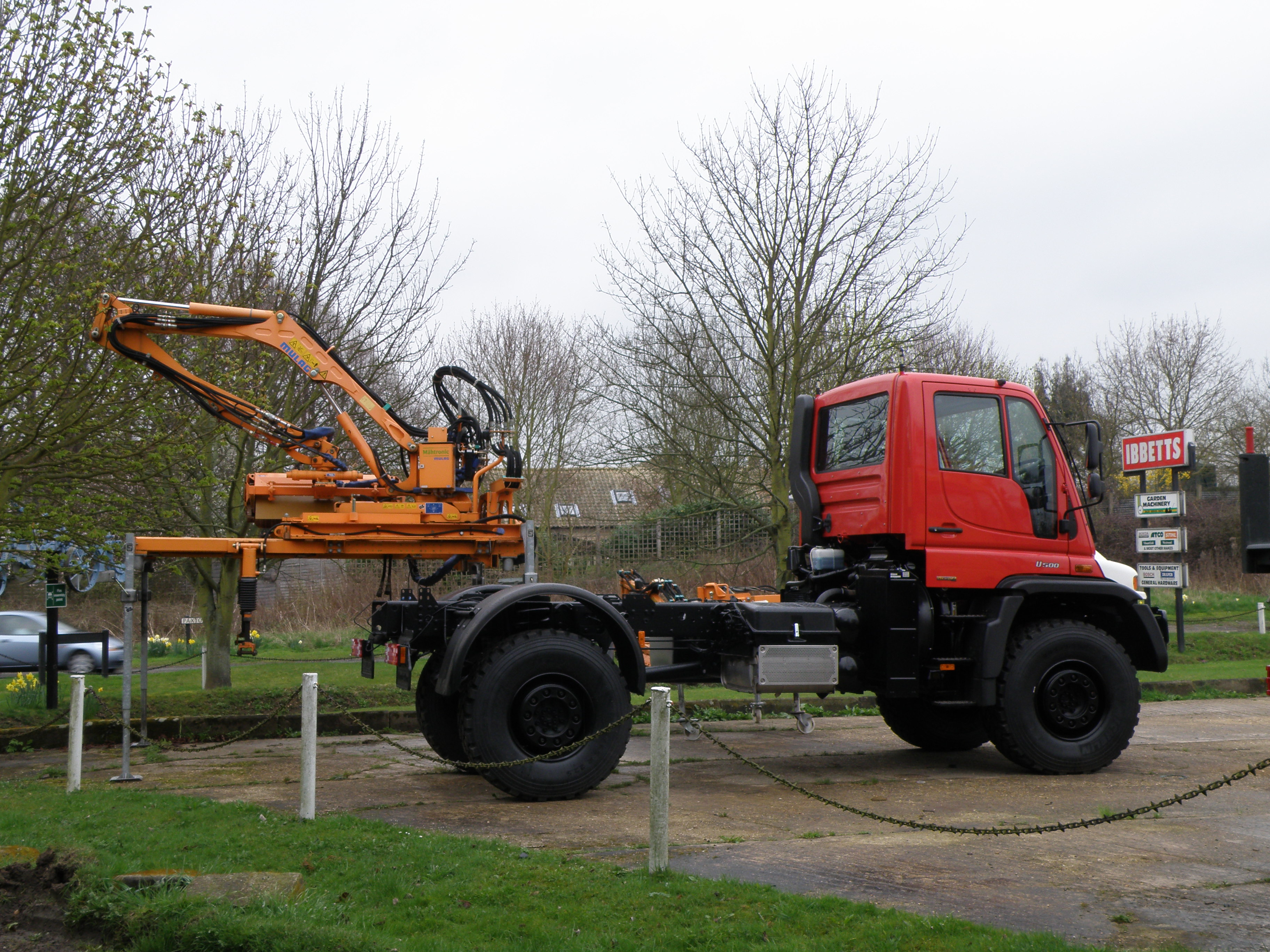
Unimog with a flail hedge and verge trimmer implement used in agroforestry

== Tractor and power ==
Farm mechanization in Ontario and Quebec; illustrating a tractor

- Tractor / Two-wheel tractor
- Tracked tractor / Caterpillar tractor

== Soil cultivation ==
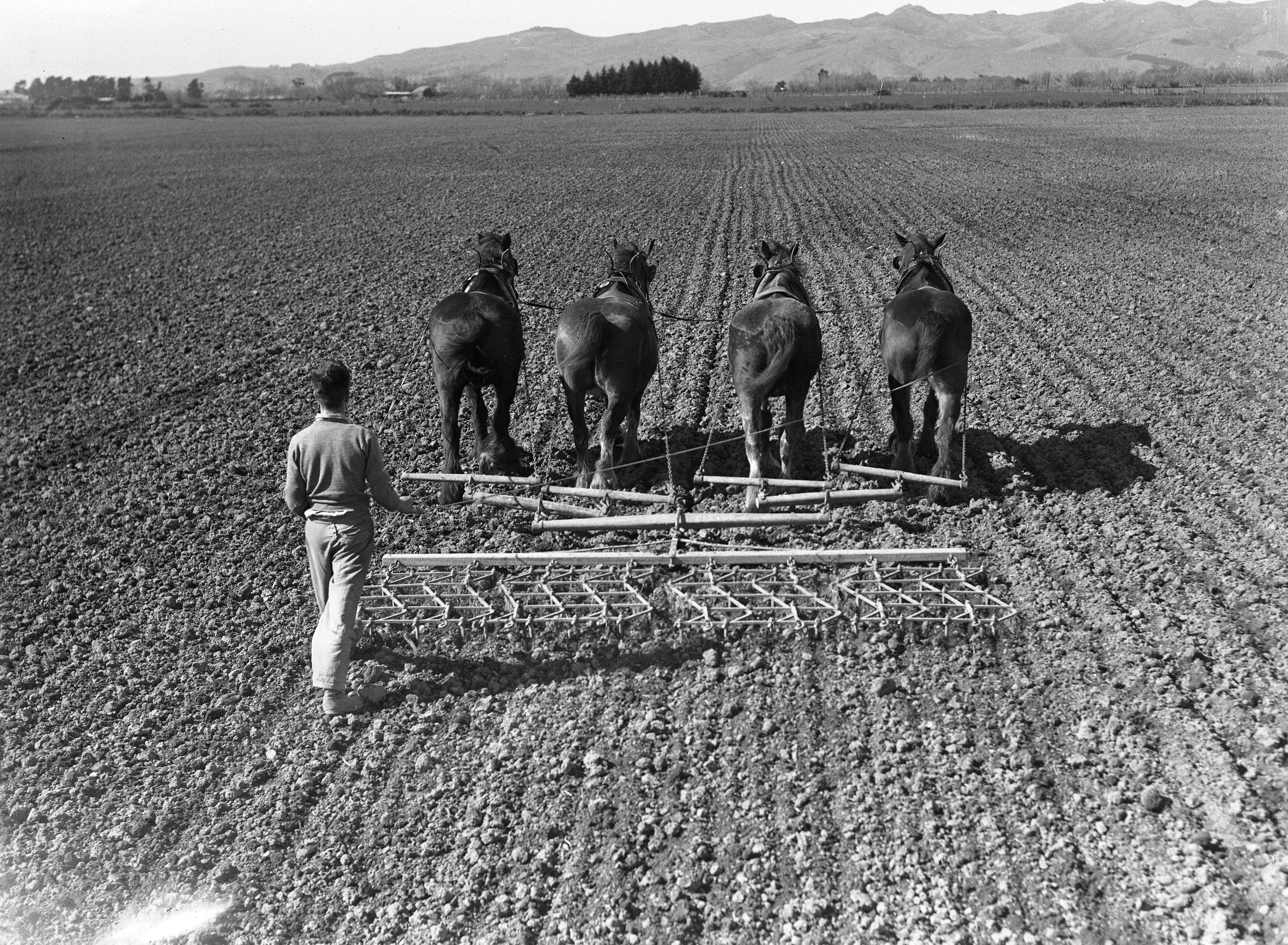
Harrow in use in 1948 at Canterbury Agricultural College farm

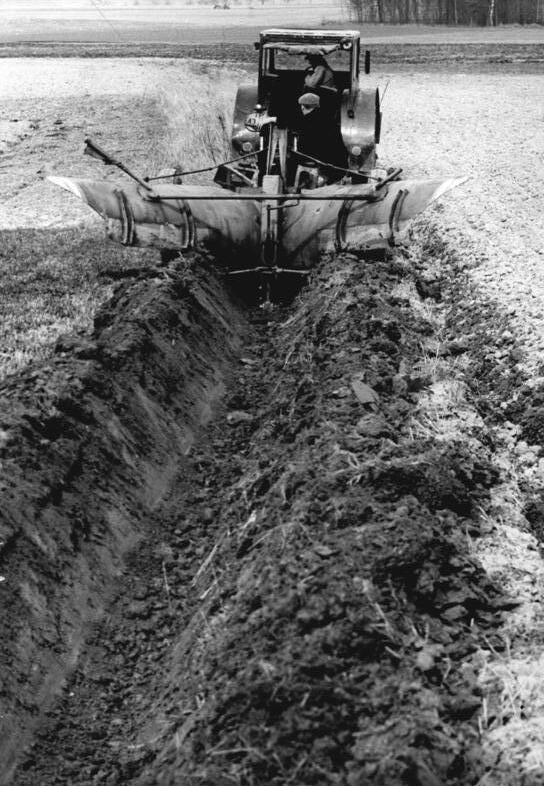
Historic huge specialist "plough" for maintaining drainage ditches in East Germany

- Cultipacker
- Cultivator (of two main variations)
  - Dragged teeth (also called shanks) that pierce the soil.
  - Rotary motion of disks or teeth. Examples are: Power tiller / Rotary tiller / Rototiller / Bedtiller / Mulch tiller / Rotavator
- Harrow (e.g. Spike harrow, Drag harrow, Disk harrow)
- Land imprinter
- Plow or plough (various specialized types)
- Roller
- Stone / Rock / Debris removal implement (e.g. Destoner, Rock windrower / rock rake, Stone picker / picker)
- Strip till toolbar (and a variation called Zone till subsoiler)
- Subsoiler
- Ridger
- Mole plough

== Planting ==
- Seed drill (box drill, air drill)
- Planter
- Potato planter
- Trowel
- Seed-counting machine

== Fertilizers and pesticides dispenser ==
- Liquid manure/slurry spreader and Liquid manure fertilizer spreader (e.g. slurry tanker or Terragator)
- Dry Manure spreader (e.g. Terragator)
- Sprayer

== Irrigation ==
- Drip irrigation/micro spray heads
- Sprinkler system
- Center pivot irrigation
- Hydroponics

== Produce sorter ==
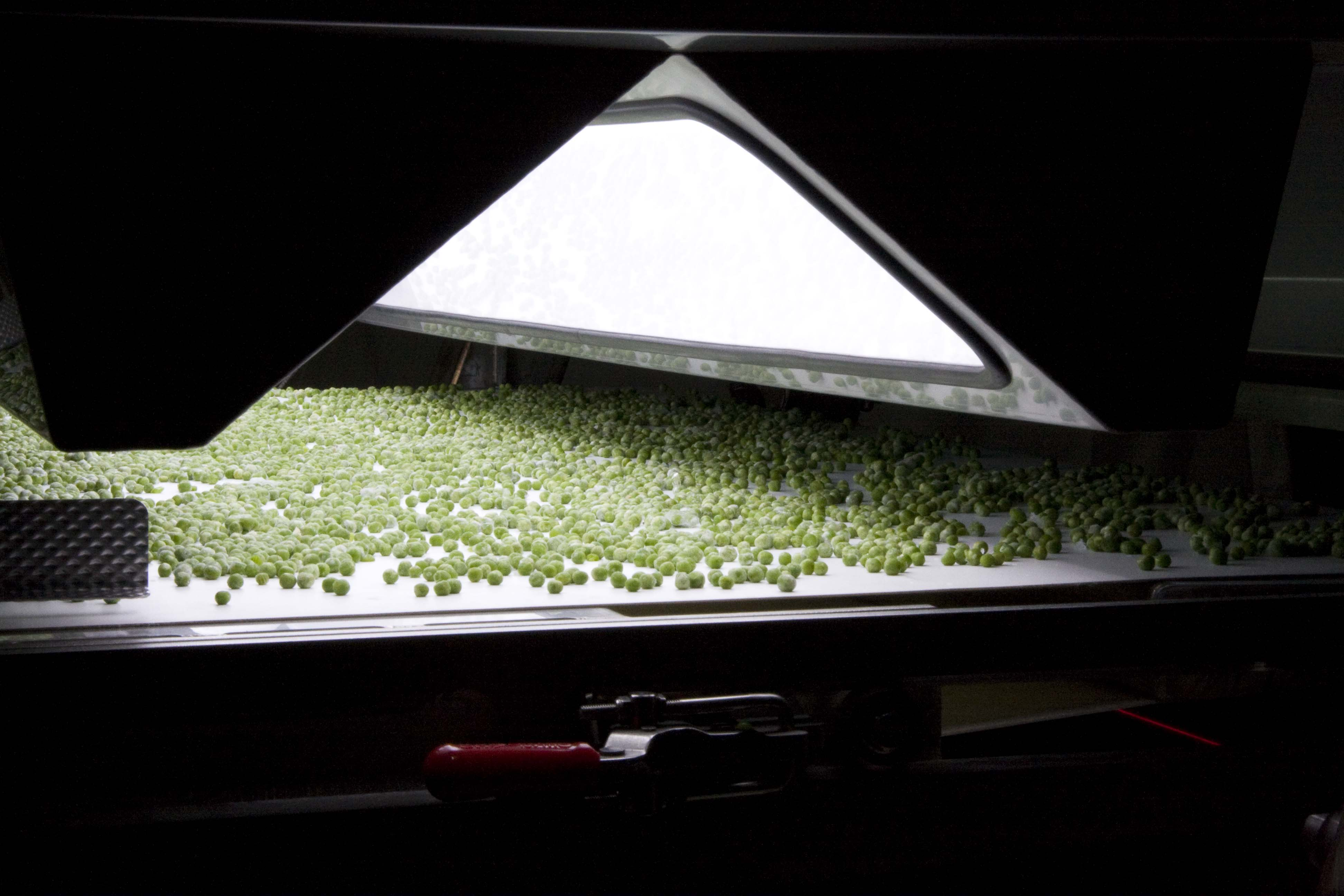
A belt sorter for peas

- Blemish sorter
- Colour sorter
- Density sorter
- Diameter sorter
- Internal/taste sorter
- Shape sorter
- Weight sorter

== Harvesting / post-harvest processing ==
- Buckrake—for silage making
- Grain cart (with built in grain auger)
- Conveyor belt
- Cotton picker
- Farm truck
- Grain dryer
- Harvestor / harvester built for harvesting specific crops. (e.g. Bean harvester, Beet harvester, Carrot harvester, Combine (grain) harvester / Stripper, Header, Corn harvester, Forage or silage harvester, Grape harvester, Over-the-row mechanical harvester for harvesting apples, Potato harvester, Potato spinner/digger which is becoming obsolete, and Sugarcane harvester. Variations of harvesters are stripper cleaners and stripper loaders.

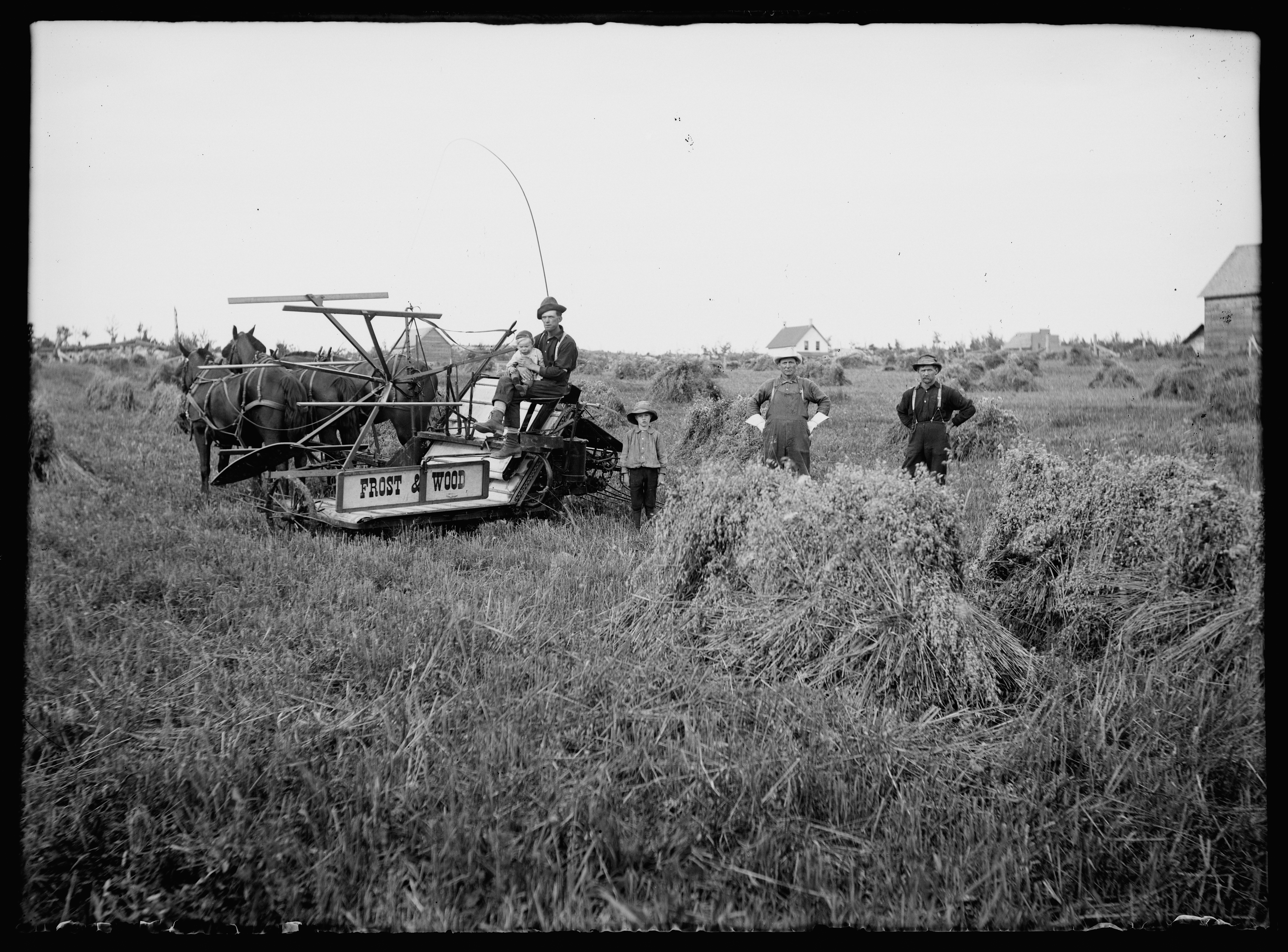
A Frost & Wood reaper- binder being used in the Rainy River District in the 1900s.

- Multi crop Harvester
- Haulm topper
- Mechanical tree shaker and other orchard equipment
- Mower
- Rake
- Reaper-binder (now mostly replaced by the swather)
- Rice huller
- Swather (more common in the northern United States and Canada)
- Wagon (and variations of gravity wagons, trailers—e.g. silage trailers, grain hopper trailers and lighter, two-wheeled carts)
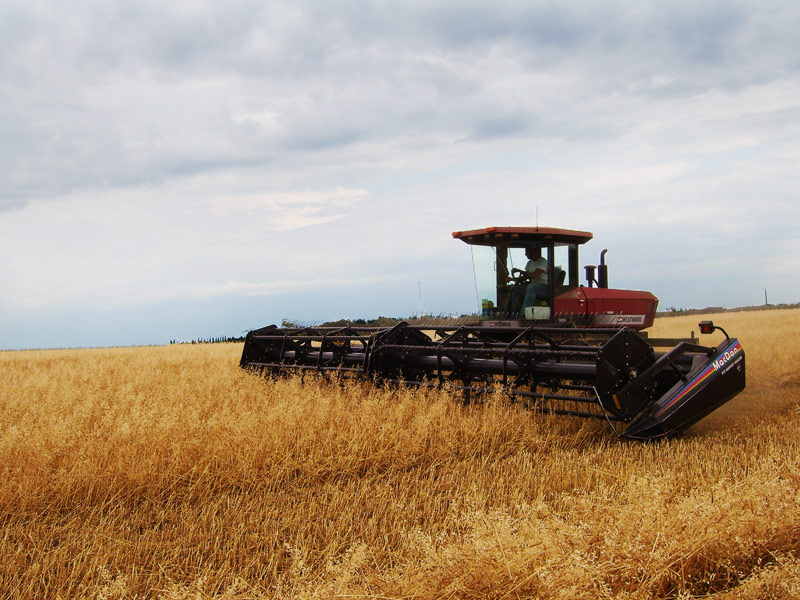
A swather

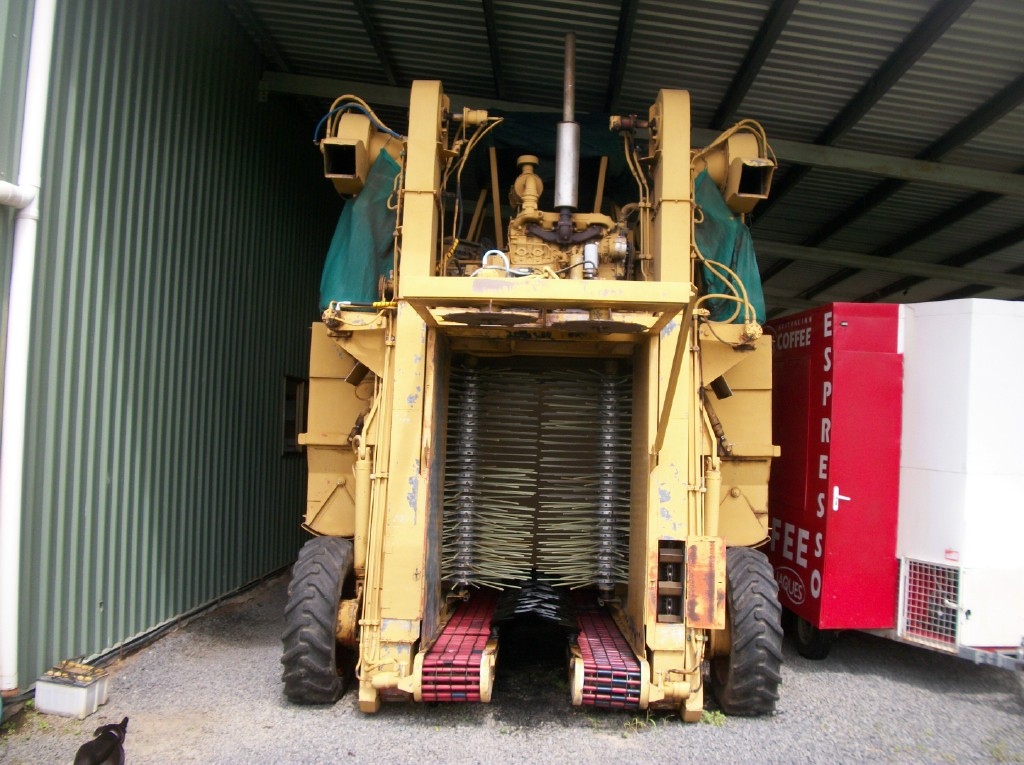
Coffee bean Harvester, Mareeba, Queensland, Australia

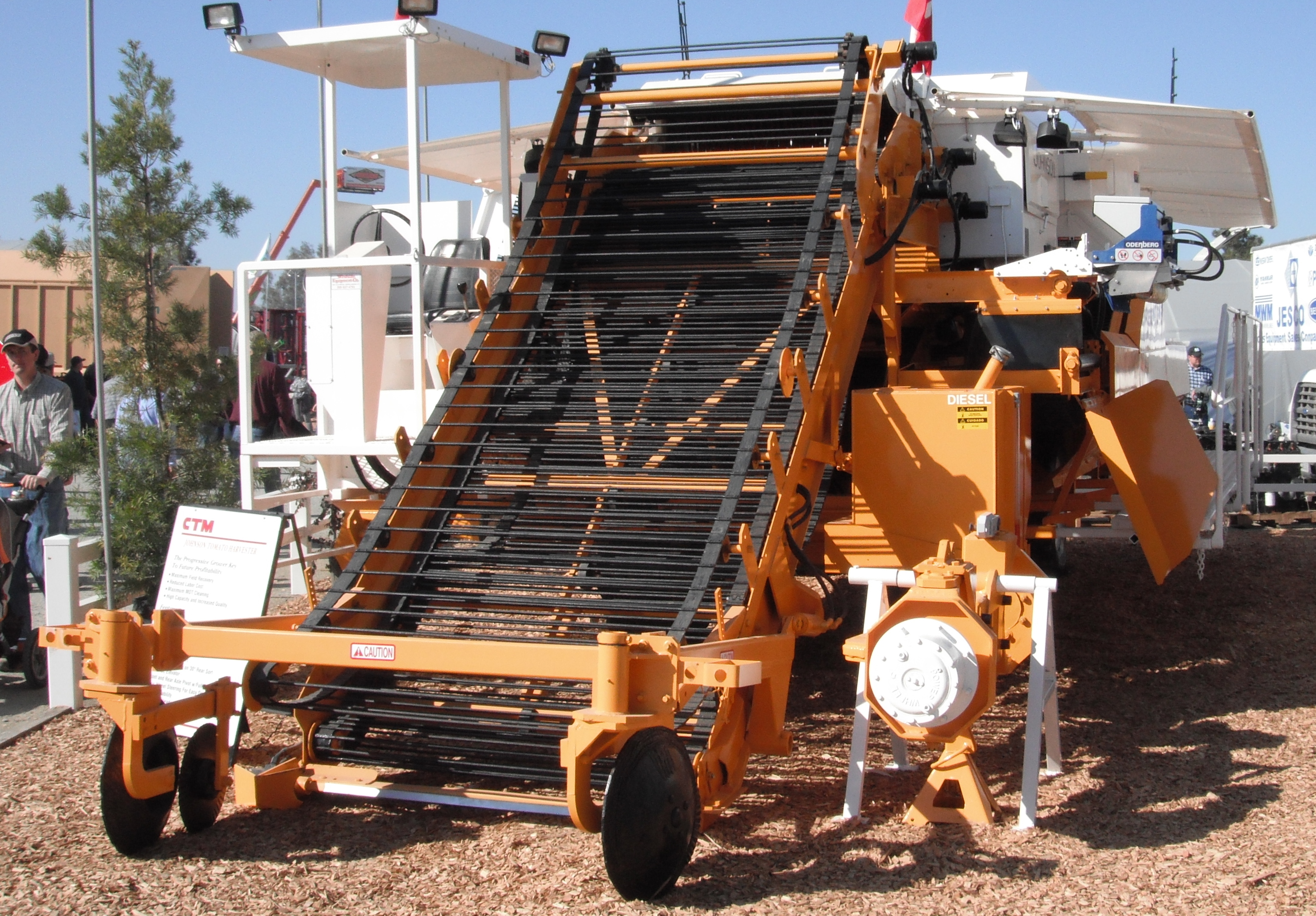
CTM Johnson Tomato Harvester

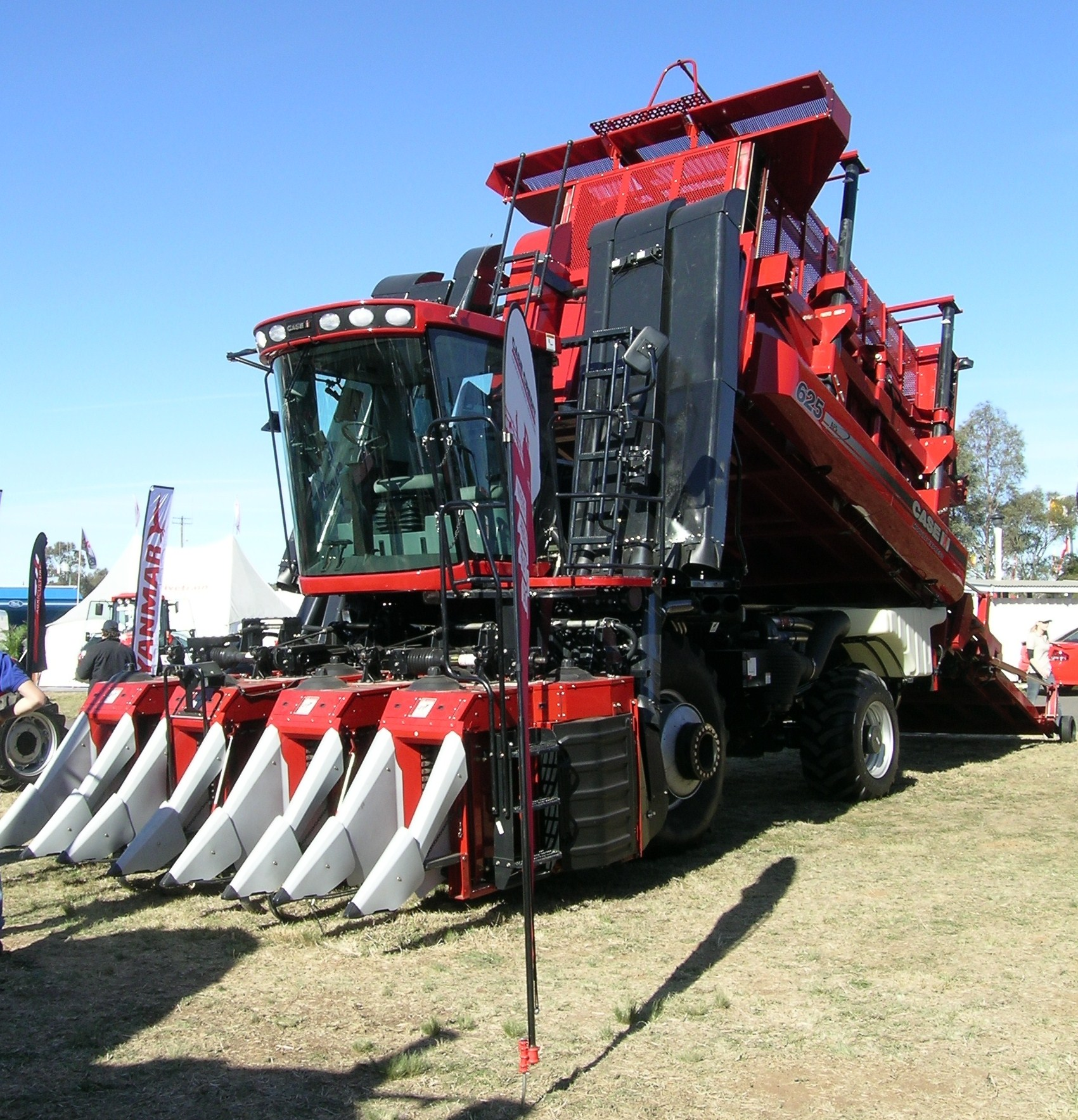
Case IH Module Express 625 picks cotton and simultaneously builds cotton modules.

=== Hand harvesting ===
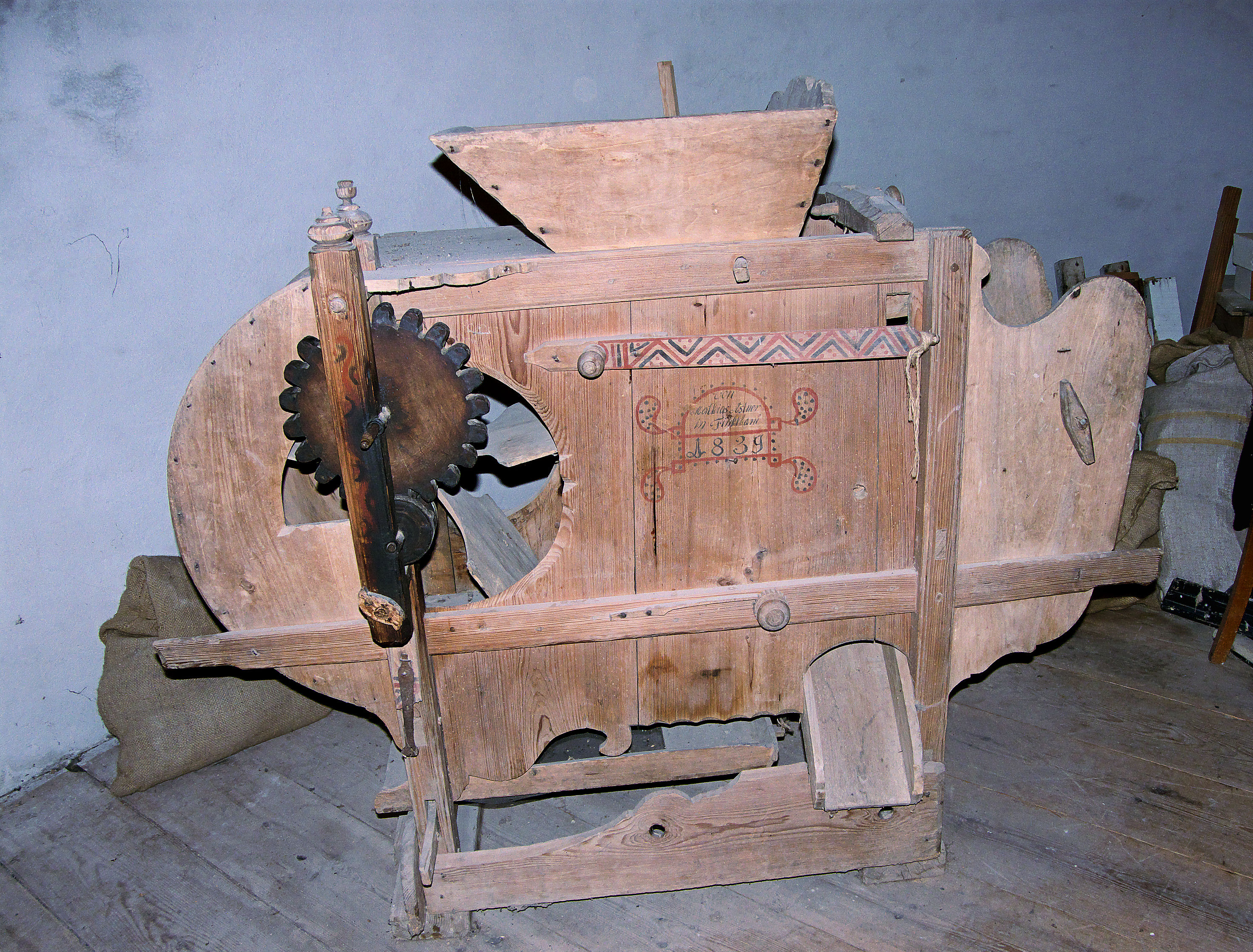
Winnowing machine from 1839

- Flail
- Sickle (hand-held)
- Scythe
- Winnower (mechanized into the winnowing machine, which has been replaced by the combine harvester

== Hay making ==
Round baler in action

- Bale lifter (also called Bale mover or Bale spike)
- Bale wrapper
- Baler
- Hay rake
- Hay tedder
- Loader wagon / self-loading wagon – used in Europe, but not common in USA
- Mower-conditioners

=== Hand hay tool ===
- Hay fork
- Wooden rake

== Loading ==
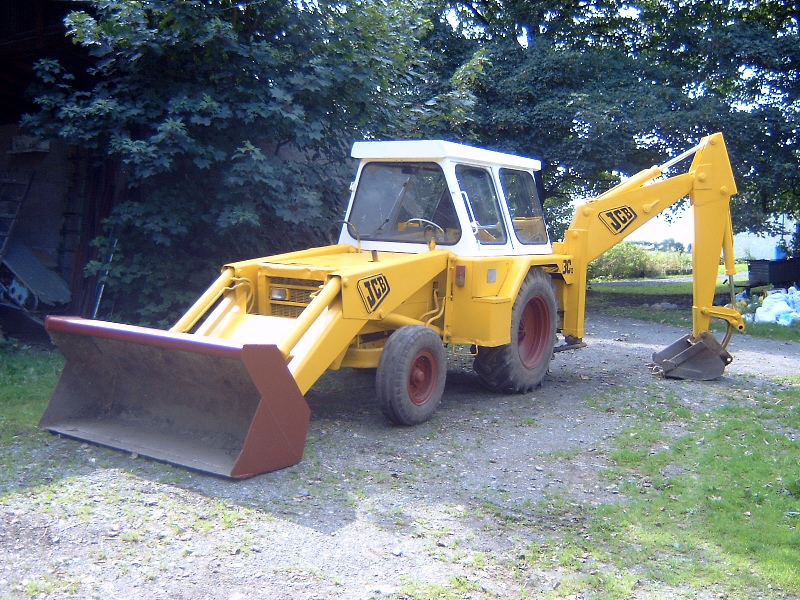
A "backhoe loader" A restored JCB 3C MkII, showing the conventional arrangement of front loader and backhoe

- Backhoe/backhoe loader
- Front end loader
- Skid-steer loader
- Telescopic handler
- Tractor-mounted forklift

== Milking ==
- Bulk tank
- Milking machine
- Milking pipeline

== Animal Feeding ==
- Grinder-mixer

== Other ==
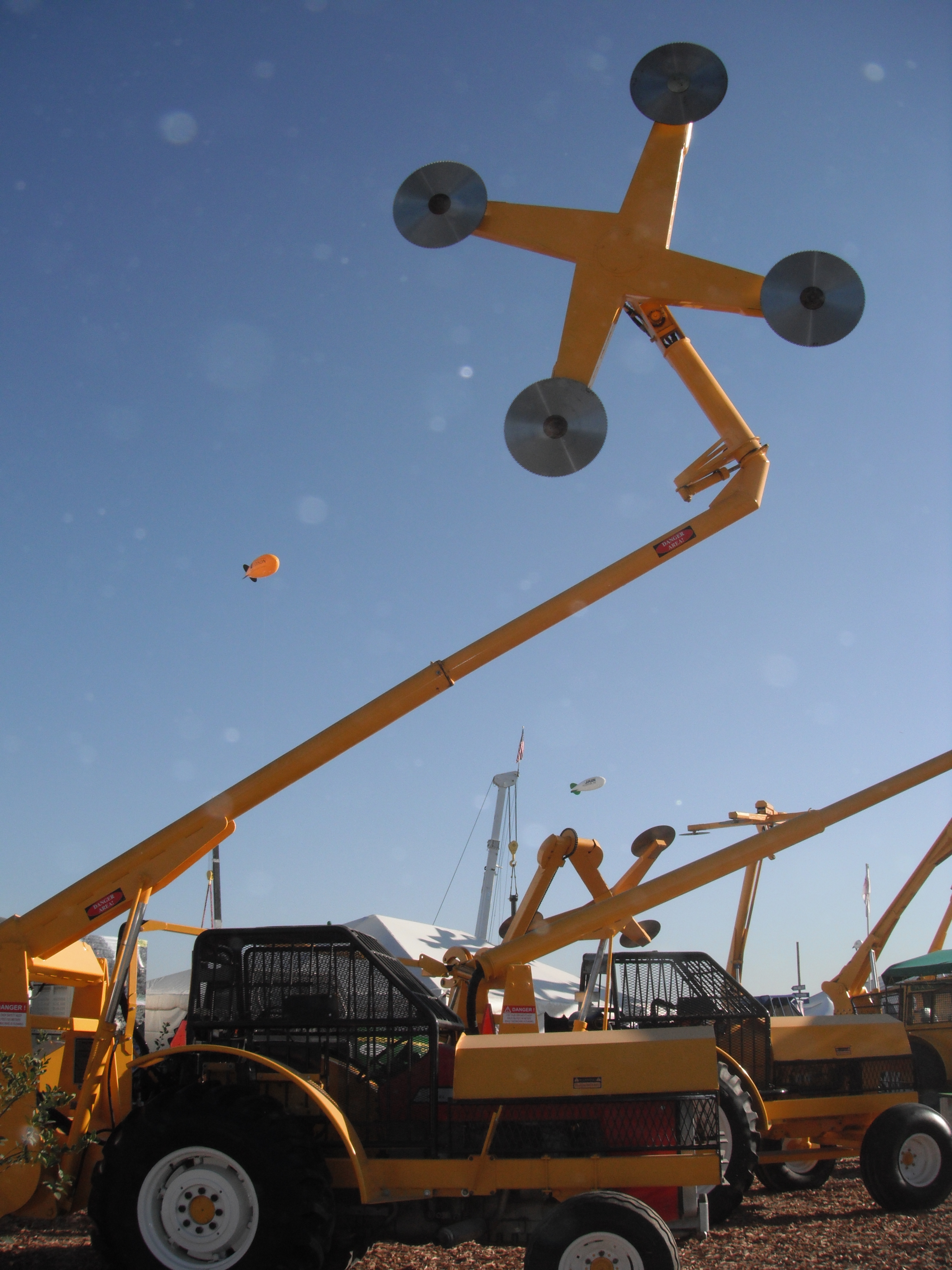
TOL Tree Trimmer

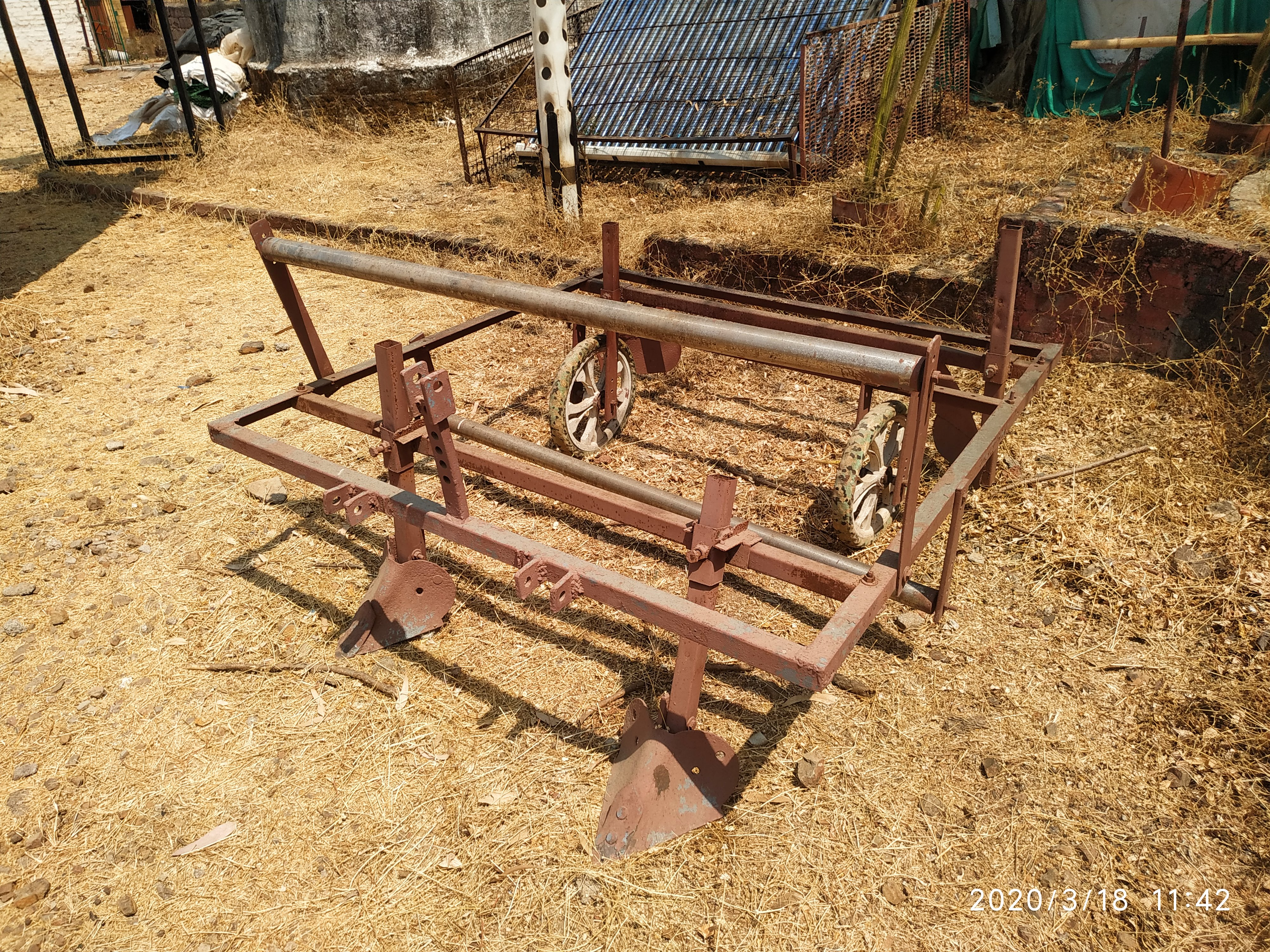
A mulching machine

- Agricultural robots
- Allen Scythe
- Aquatic weed harvester
- Bale splitter
- Chillcuring
- Conveyor analyzer
- Feed grinder
- Hedge cutter
- Hedge trimmer
- Livestock trailer
- Motor Bikes (used on large cattle stations and ranches)
- Mixer-wagon (diet feeder)
- Mulching machine
- Post driver (and hand tool)
- Quad Bikes
- Shear Grab (and power link box)
- Trailer
- Yard scraper

== Obsolete farm machinery ==
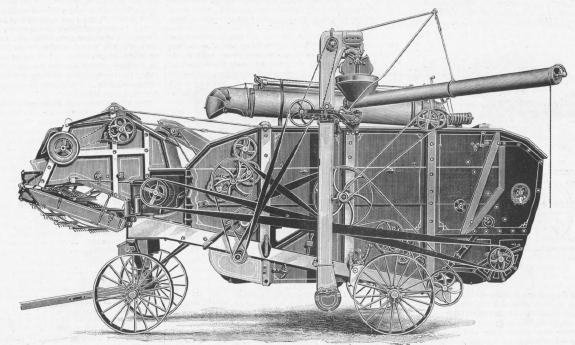
A Geiser threshing machine

Steam-powered:

- Portable engine
- Stationary steam engine
- Threshing machine (replaced by the combine harvester)
- Traction engine (e.g. Agricultural engine, Ploughing engine, Steam tractor)

Other:

- Drag harrow
- Hog oiler
- Reaper (replaced by the Stripper and Reaper-binder)
- Winnowing machine/Winnowing-fan
