= Tattie holidays =

Scottish holiday

The tattie holidays are a school holiday in Scotland typically falling around October. The holiday started in the 1930s, when children would be taken out of school to help with the local potato harvest, with other children just not turning up for class. The tradition continued into the 1980s, when the advent of new farm machinery such as potato harvesters made hand picking potatoes obsolete. The word "tattie" comes from the Scots word for potato.

Tractors would plough the fields to uncover the potatoes then pickers or howkers, usually composed of women and schoolchildren who were better suited for potato picking, would pick the potatoes (or howk the tatties), piling them into laundry baskets that farmers would empty onto a pile. Children from towns and cities would be transported to the fields by a farmer. A day's work in the 1980s could earn a picker around £9-£10 with up to two tonnes of potatoes gathered. The payment would be used to supplement a household's income.

== History ==
Prior to the establishment of the holiday, parents whose livelihoods depended on the potato harvest would take their children out of school to help with the harvest, with the schools granting exceptions. However, a rising number of truancy resulted in Forfar Academy releasing all children from school for the duration of the harvest. In 1939 schools in Alyth closed for the harvest with Dunfermline following suit in 1940. By 1949, about 49,000 children were taking part in the harvest.

In 1947 an Act set a national standard for setting school breaks. Colin Thornton-Kemsley, MP for North Angus and Mearns, argued in 1955 in favour of allowing local authorities to set the holiday in accordance with the local harvest, as had been allowed prior to the act, as different parts of the country had different harvesting times.

The practice was phased out in the 1980s, as machinery such as the potato harvester, capable of harvesting 200 tonnes of potatoes a day, made potato picking obsolete. Despite this, the holiday remains in Scotland.
