= Potato digger =

Potato digger may refer to:

- a person digging potatoes out of the ground
- Potato spinner, an agricultural machine
- M1895 Colt–Browning, a machine gun nicknamed potato digger
