= Vehicle registration plates of Thailand =

Thailand ทะเบียนรถยนต์ในประเทศไทย
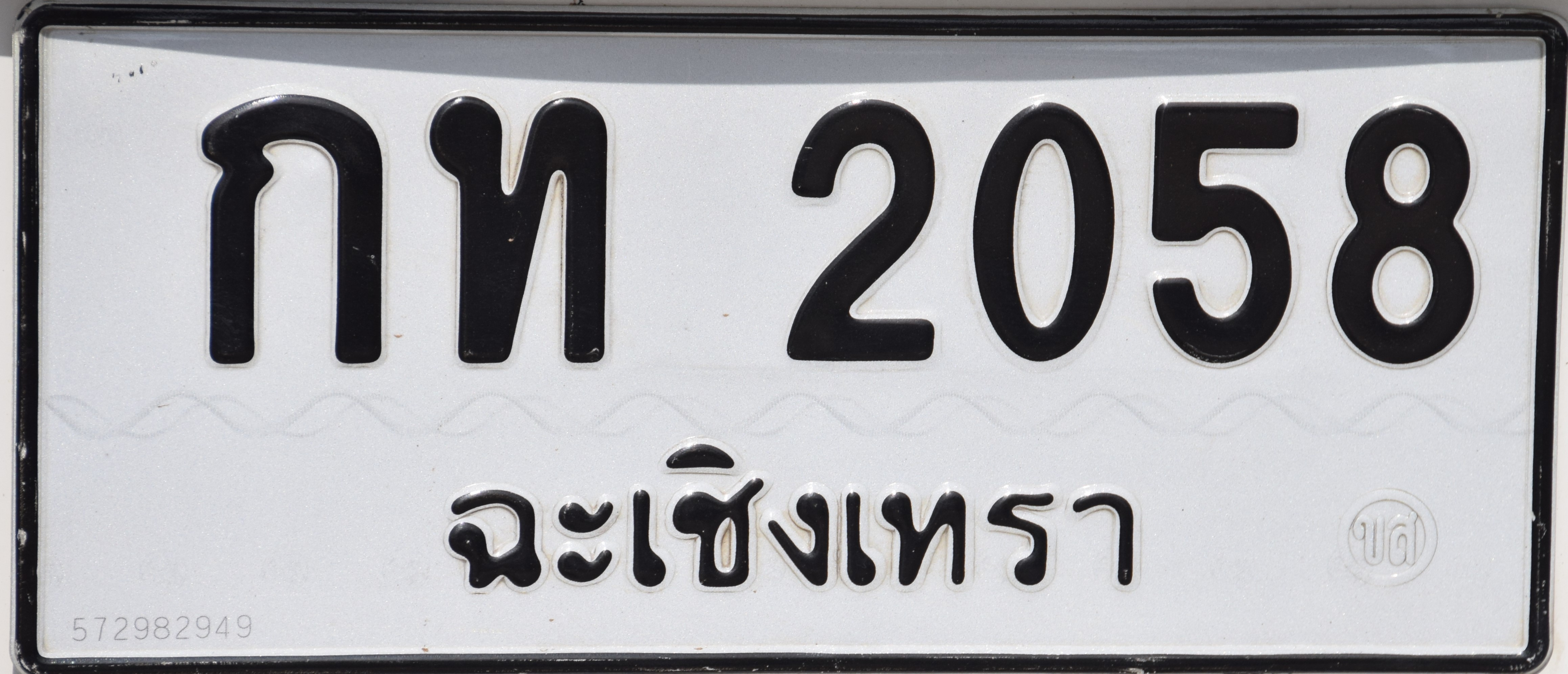
- Regular legal standard licence plate
- Country: Thailand
- Country code: T

Current series
- Size: 150 mm × 340 mm 5.9 in × 13.4 in
- Serial format: Not standard
- Colour (front): Black on white
- Colour (rear): Black on white

Thailand's vehicle registration plates are issued by the Department of Land Transport (DLT) of the Ministry of Transport. They must be displayed on all motorized road vehicles (with the exception of royal-, police- and military-owned vehicles), as required by the Motor Vehicle Act, B.E. 2522 (1979 CE) and the Land Transport Act, B.E. 2522. The plates vary in design, colors and dimensions according to the type of vehicle, but usually display a registration number (usually a two-character letter or numerical prefix and a four-digit number) and the vehicle's province of registration. Specifications are given in Ministry of Transport regulations. Current style started in 1975 for most vehicle types, but with small changes in 1997, and 1997 for motorcycles.

== Design ==
All license plates are rectangular, with variations in size and color according to the class of the vehicle. Most plates prominently display the vehicle registration ID, which usually consists of Thai letters and a number string. The province of registration is shown below the ID. (Note: An exception is Betong, Yala, which is the only district with its own registrar and may appear on license plates.) The letters are embossed, and all plates must also be embossed with a seal bearing the letters "ขส". The current designs are regulated by the notification of the Department of Land Transport dated B.E. 2554 (2011 CE) for buses and trucks, and by the ministerial regulation issued B.E. 2554 for other motor vehicles.

=== General plates ===
Plates for cars, vans, pick-up trucks, motorised tricycles, trailers, road rollers, tractors and agricultural vehicles follow the same design. They are 15 by 34 centimetres (5.9 by 13.4 in) in size, with a coloured and embossed outline. The registration ID consists of two series letters followed by a serial number string of up to four digits, from 1 to 9999, without leading zeroes, e.g. "กข 1" or "กข 1234". A leading digit may be added in front of the two letters if the letter pool has been exhausted, as is the case in Bangkok since 2012, giving the format "1กข 1234". Due to the case, the new plates, since 2012, have reduced text size, to keep the plate size. The province of registration is displayed in Thai underneath the registration ID, with the exception of Yala Province which cars can also register at Betong District, due to its distant proximity from Mueang Yala District where the administrative offices are located. The colors of the text and background depend on the type of vehicle, and are given in following table:

Vehicle type	Background color	Text color	Example image
Inter-province taxis	Yellow	Red	
Car taxis	Yellow	Black	
Motorized tricycle taxis (tuk-tuks)	Yellow	Green	
Mini truck taxis (commonly known locally as "Subaru"s)	Yellow	Blue	
Business-, tourist- and rental-service vehicles (including airport and hotel taxis)	Green (aquamarine)	White	
Private cars (not more than seven seats) (including 4-door pick-up trucks)	White	Black	
Private vans (more than seven seats)	White	Blue	
Private 2-door pick-up trucks	White	Green	
Private motorized tricycles	White	Red	
Small trailers, road rollers, tractors and agricultural vehicles	Orange	Black	

==== Vanity (auction) plates ====
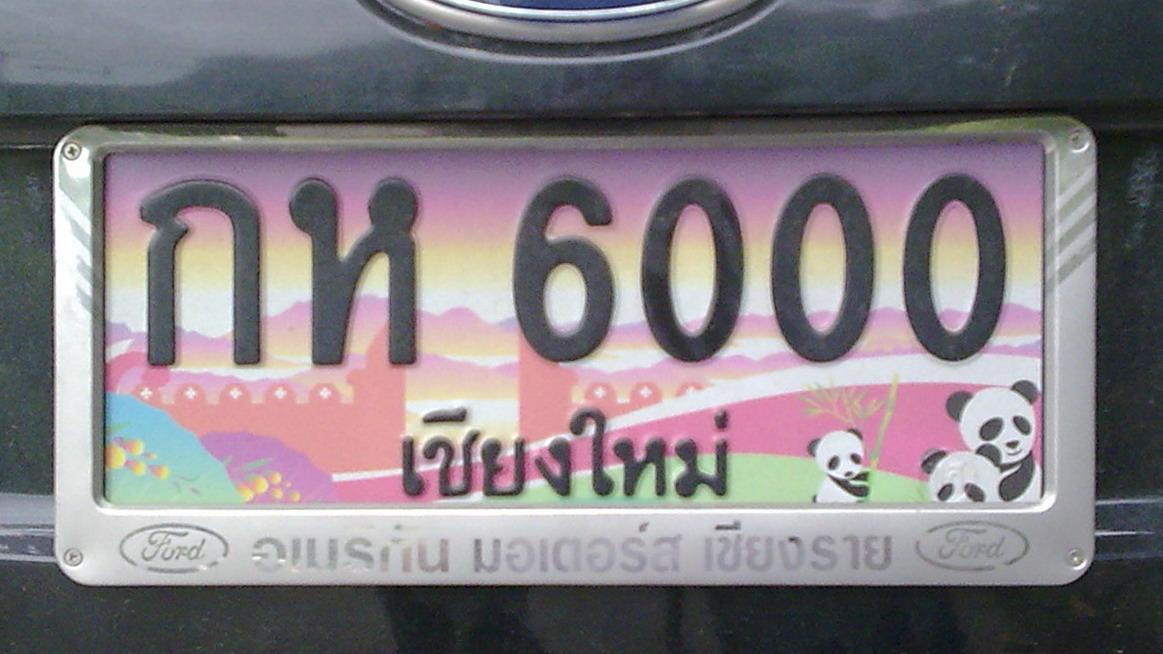
A vanity plate issued in Chiang Mai Province

Since 2003, certain serial numbers in each series are made available for auction. These include single-digit numbers (1); twin (11), triplet (111) and quadruplet (1111) numbers, round thousands (1000); straight three-digit (123) and four-digit (1234) numbers; and pairs of two like numbers (1122, 1212, 1221). Such IDs are accompanied by vanity plates with a special background image customized for each province. The auction plates, also called Super Number (Thai: ทะเบียนรถเลขสวย, RTGS: thabian rot lek suai, lit. meaning "beautiful number car registration plate") by the Department of Land Transport (DLT), are only in private passenger car type until 2014, when private pick-up and private van auction plates are made available.

In 2014, the highest price paid at auction for a vanity plate was set at 25,000,000 baht (about US$771,000) for a Bangkok plate "1กก 1111 กรุงเทพมหานคร". Because of its very high price, DLT allowed the buyer to design the background image. On October 10, 2020, the new record was set at 28,100,000 baht (about US$935,000) for "8กก 8888 กรุงเทพมหานคร". On December 10, 2022, the auction of 9กก group plates of Bangkok took place, and the new record was set at 45,090,000 baht (about US$1,300,000) for "9กก 9999 กรุงเทพมหานคร".

In 2021, the Department of Land Transport confirmed the plan to release personalized plates for private passenger car type via auction. The serial letters can be a word or a person name in the Thai script: longer than 2-3 letters in the standard plates, and vowel and tone symbols can be used. The first auction of special plates took place in Bangkok on April 7, 2022, with 84 Bangkok special plates, most of them are auspicious words and numbers, and few of them are names or nicknames with numbers.

==== Series letters ====
Series letters are specific to vehicle classes, after the combinations starting with two letters are exhausted, a number is put before the letters: for example 1กก, 1กข...

Private cars begin with (in order of adoption) ก, ข, ง, จ, ฉ, ธ, ฐ, พ, ภ, ว, ศ, ษ, ส, ช, ฌ, ญ, ฎ and ฆ (in Bangkok กก (1ก of old style plates) - พล (9ณ of old style plates) are used for change from old style plate to new style plate).

Old style private cars plates begin with (in order of adoption) ก, ข, ค, ง, จ, ฉ, ช, ธ, ว, อ, ฮ, ฐ, ศ, ฬ, ษ, ณ.

Private Pick-up trucks begin with (in alphabetical order) ฒ, ณ, ต, ถ, บ, ป, ผ, ย, ร and ล.

Private vans begin with น, ฬ, อ and ฮ.

Public taxis begin with ท (in order of ทค, ทง, ทจ, ทฉ, ทต, ทท, ทธ, ทน, ทพ, ทม, ทย, ทร, ทล, ทว, ทศ, ทษ, ทส, ทห, ทฬ, ทอ and ทฮ), (ทก, ทข are for permanently licensed private non-meter taxis, currently stopped license for these types of taxis).

Public Yellow-green taxis begin with ม (in order of มก, มข, มค, มง, มจ, มฉ, มช, มฎ, 1มก, 1มข, 1มค, 1มฆ).

Public mini truck taxis for public transportation begin with ฟ.

Public Tuk-Tuk taxis beginning with ศ (only ศข) and ส (only สก, สข).

Some beginning with ฌ, ณ with green background and white text are used by service vehicles.

Trailers, road rollers, tractors and agricultural vehicles, including rot i-taen (Thai farm trucks), have ซ as their first series letter, or ฆ for some provinces.

Each new letter pair is announced by the DLT. Each provincial registrar accordingly registers new vehicles under its latest available letter pair until all 9,999 numbers have been exhausted, then moves onto the next series letter. Letters whose appearance may be confused are skipped, and so are letter pairs which form words with bad meanings. For example, the combinations "ชน" and "ตด" are not used, as they form words meaning "crash" and "fart".

==== Historical designs ====
Although license plates have likely been used since the promulgation of the Motor Vehicle Act, Rattanakosin Era 128 (1910 CE), the earliest legislation of which details are available is from 1967. The size of license plates was specified at 11 by 39 centimeters, with white text on a black background. A two-letter abbreviation of the province name, arranged vertically, was displayed to the left, and the registration ID, consisting of either a five-digit serial number or a single series letter and a four-digit serial number, was displayed to the right, e.g., "(ก.ท.) 01234" or "(ก.ท.) ก-0123". This was changed in 1975 to black-on-white plates with a size of 15 by 30 centimeters. The series identifier for Bangkok was also changed to consist of one-digit number plus one letter, e.g., "1ก-0123". The province name was given in full under the ID, as in the current system. The serial number was displayed with leading zeros, which were dropped, along with the dash, when the current format was adopted in 1997.

=== Motorcycle plates ===
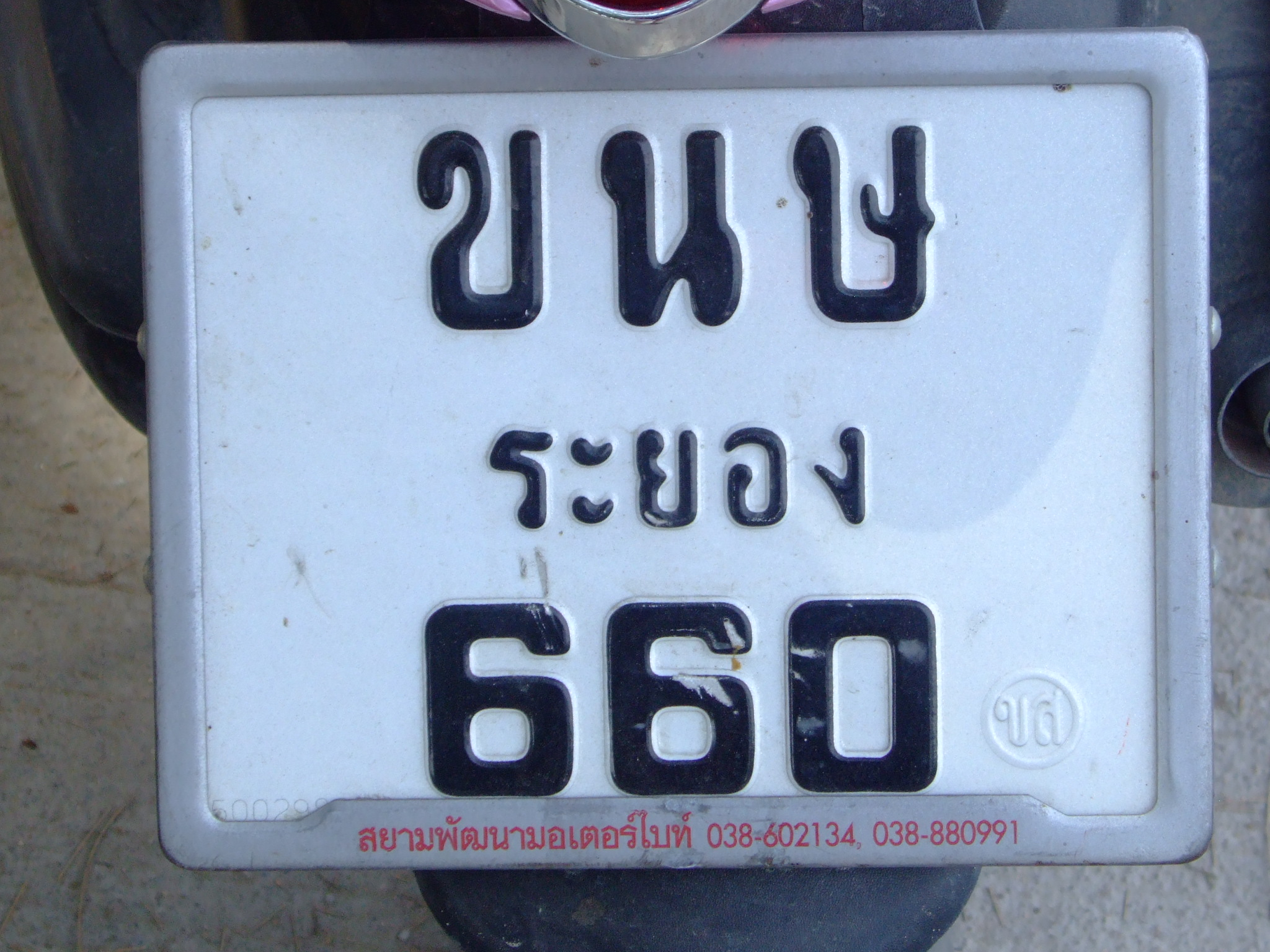

Plates for motorcycles are 17.2 by 22 centimeters, with an outline. Information is displayed in three horizontal rows. The series letters and leading number is displayed on the top row, and a serial number of up to four digits on the bottom row, e.g. "1กข 1234". The province of registration is shown on the middle row. (Note: The use of this system is expected to begin in 2013. Current motorcycle IDs follow the form "กขค 123".) The lettering is done in black, with a white background for private motorcycles and a yellow background for hired motorcycles.

=== Diplomatic vehicle plates ===
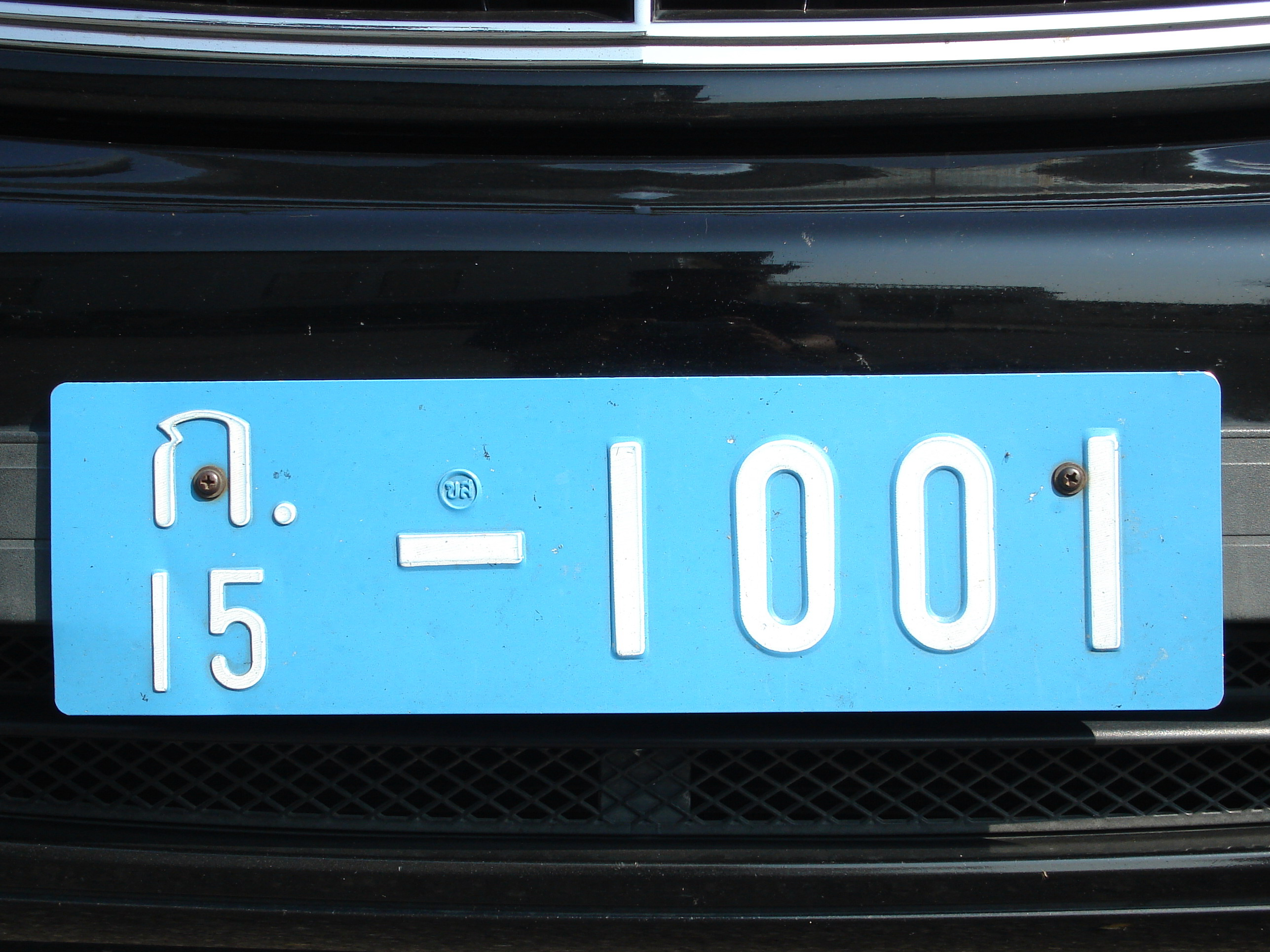

License plates issued to members of diplomatic missions, international organizations or United Nations specialized agencies based in Thailand are 11 by 38.7 centimeters in size, with the format "ท 01 - 1234". On the top left is a letter denoting the status of the registrant ("ท" for diplomatic agents, "พ" for members of special embassy agencies, "ก" for consular agents, and "อ" for international organizations or United Nations agencies). On the bottom left is a number code denoting the country or organization. On the right is a serial number string of up to four digits, with a separating horizontal line in the middle. Motorcycle plates have a similar appearance but with a size of 9 by 27 centimetres (3.5 by 10.6 in). Plates issued to diplomatic agents are colored black on white, those issued to honorary consuls are black on gray, and others are white on light blue.

=== Bus and truck plates ===
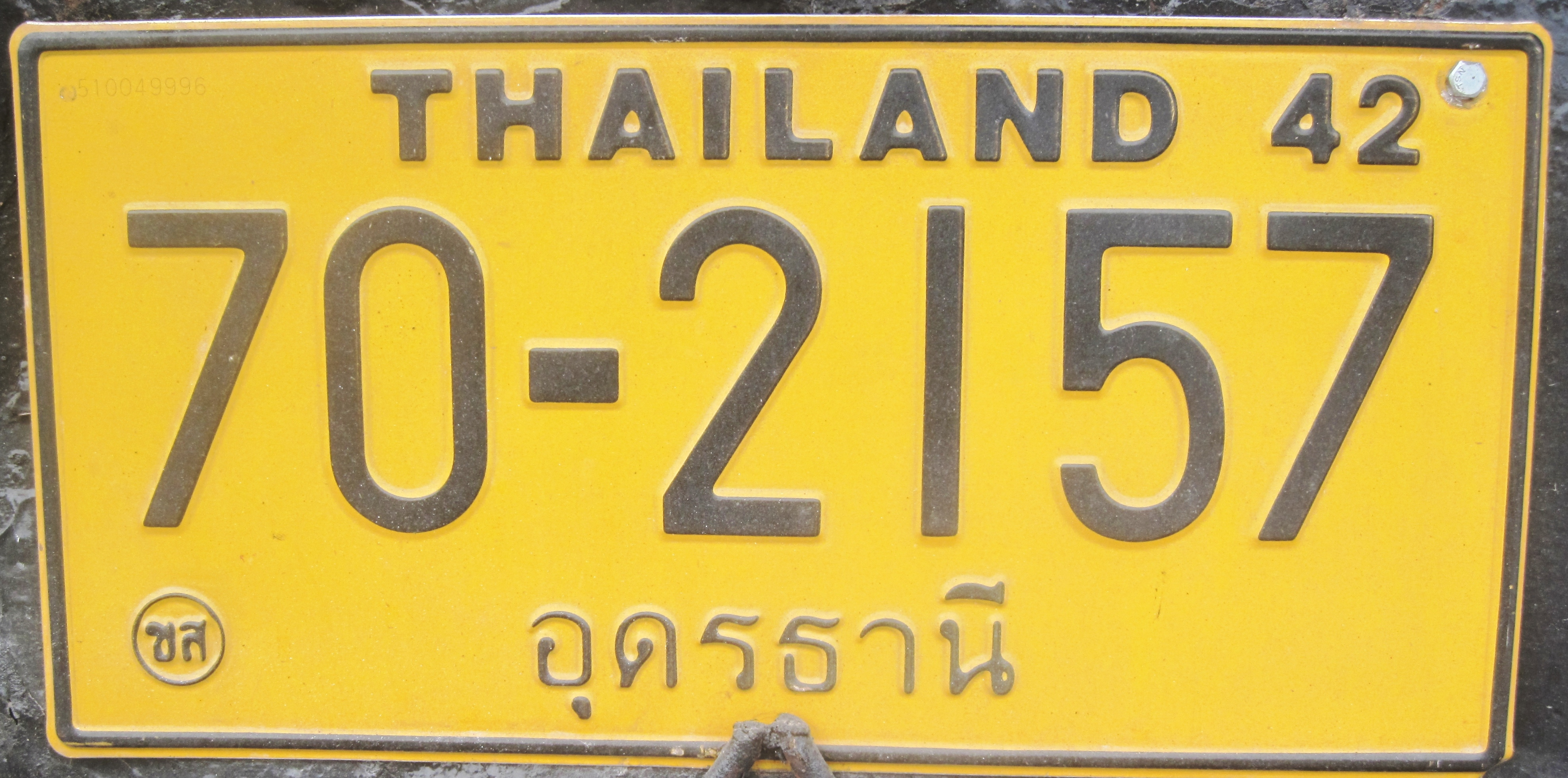
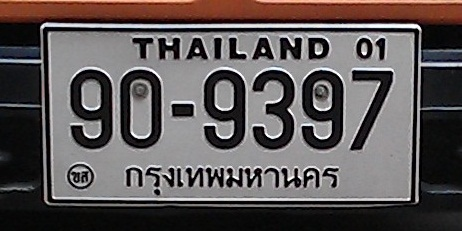

License plates for buses and trucks are separately regulated, and have a size of 22 by 44 centimetres (8.7 by 17.3 in). They show the registration number which consists of two series digits and four serial digits (with leading zeros), separated by a horizontal line. The word THAILAND is displayed in capital letters above the number. The province of registration is displayed below the number, with the "ขส" seal to the left. A numerical provincial code is shown in the top right. The text is colored black, with a yellow background for hired vehicles and a white background for private vehicles.

== Legal requirements ==
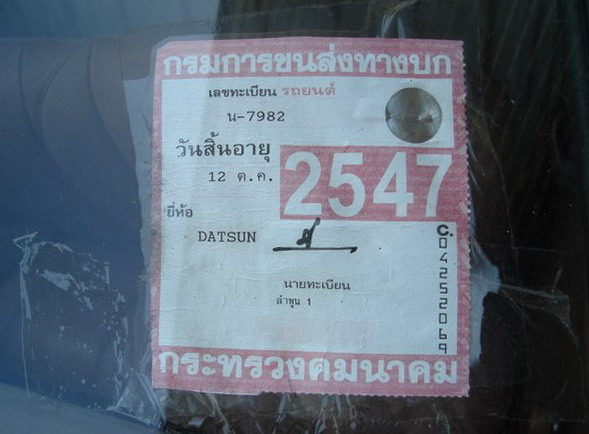
Annual tax windshield decal

All DLT-registered vehicles are required to mount a registration plate in an easily visible position at the front and at the rear of the vehicle, except for motorcycles, for which only rear-mounting is required. Vehicles must also display an annual tax payment decal on the windshield or another visible location, depending on the type of vehicle.

== Special uses ==
=== Trade plates ===
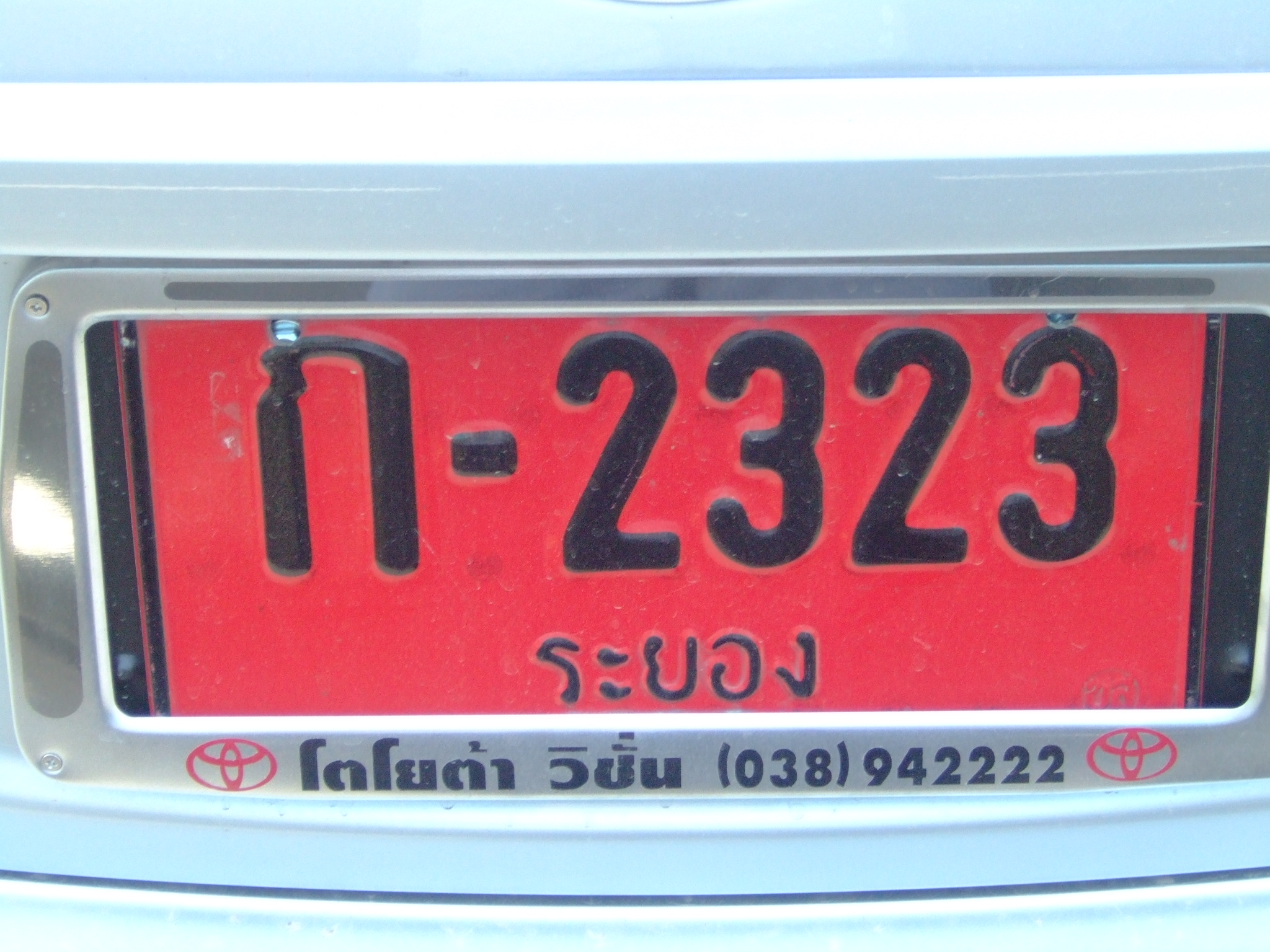

Similar to those issued in the United Kingdom, motor dealers' (trade) plates, or temporary license plates, are typically carried by unregistered vehicles or vehicles without proper documents (i.e., a road tax and insurance). While the plate is most commonly utilised by authorised vehicle dealers and local vehicle companies with approvals and permits from the DLT, they are commonly issued to new vehicles for use during the eight weeks or so that it takes for new plates to be issued.

Trade plates carry a significant number of restrictions. Drivers with red plates must seek permission from authorities if they want to use the vehicle at night. Cars with red plates cannot be driven out of the province where the vehicle was registered at purchase. Drivers must ask for permission each time they want to travel outside the specified area. Documents must be in order, with the destination and the dates of travel. Red-plated cars are not allowed to use expressways. Drivers of cars with red plates must have all car-related documents, a proper driving licence, and ID card ready for checks at all times. Police officers are authorized to stop any car with a red plate to examine the car and the driver's documents even if no traffic offence has occurred.

Trade plates are also used by foreign vehicles without proper permits or document from their countries of origin to gain permission of entry into Thailand, when clearance is authorised by customs. In special cases, such as the transfer of show cars, trade plates may also be borrowed from the DLT.

Trade plates are made from pressed alloy, with a red background and black digits. Trade plates are one or two consonants and four digits long.

As of July 2015, DLT has a plan to stop the use of trade plate as temporary license plates, and use a quicker car registration process.

Since 3 April 2017, the Department of Land Transport has issued special registration plates for test vehicles used by automotive manufacturers. These plates are intended to distinguish prototype and evaluation vehicles from regular private vehicles. Plates with the prefix TC are used on manufacturer prototype vehicles that require on-road testing for performance, system evaluation, and development purposes.

=== Test vehicle plates ===
License plates with the prefix TC are used for pre-production test vehicles, while those with the prefix QC are used for pre-sale quality test vehicles. They have been in use since 3 April 2017.

The design of these plates is identical to private car plates. They use a white reflective background with embossed lettering and the DLT seal. The top line begins with the prefix TC or QC followed by up to four digits, and the lower line shows the province of registration. Motorcycle plates follow the same layout as standard motorcycle plates, with the prefix and numbers on the top line and the province on the second line.

These plates are issued only to authorized manufacturers and are not the same as temporary trade plates or international travel plates.

=== Plates for international travel ===
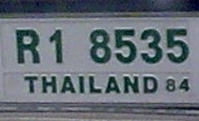
Temporary Thai plate

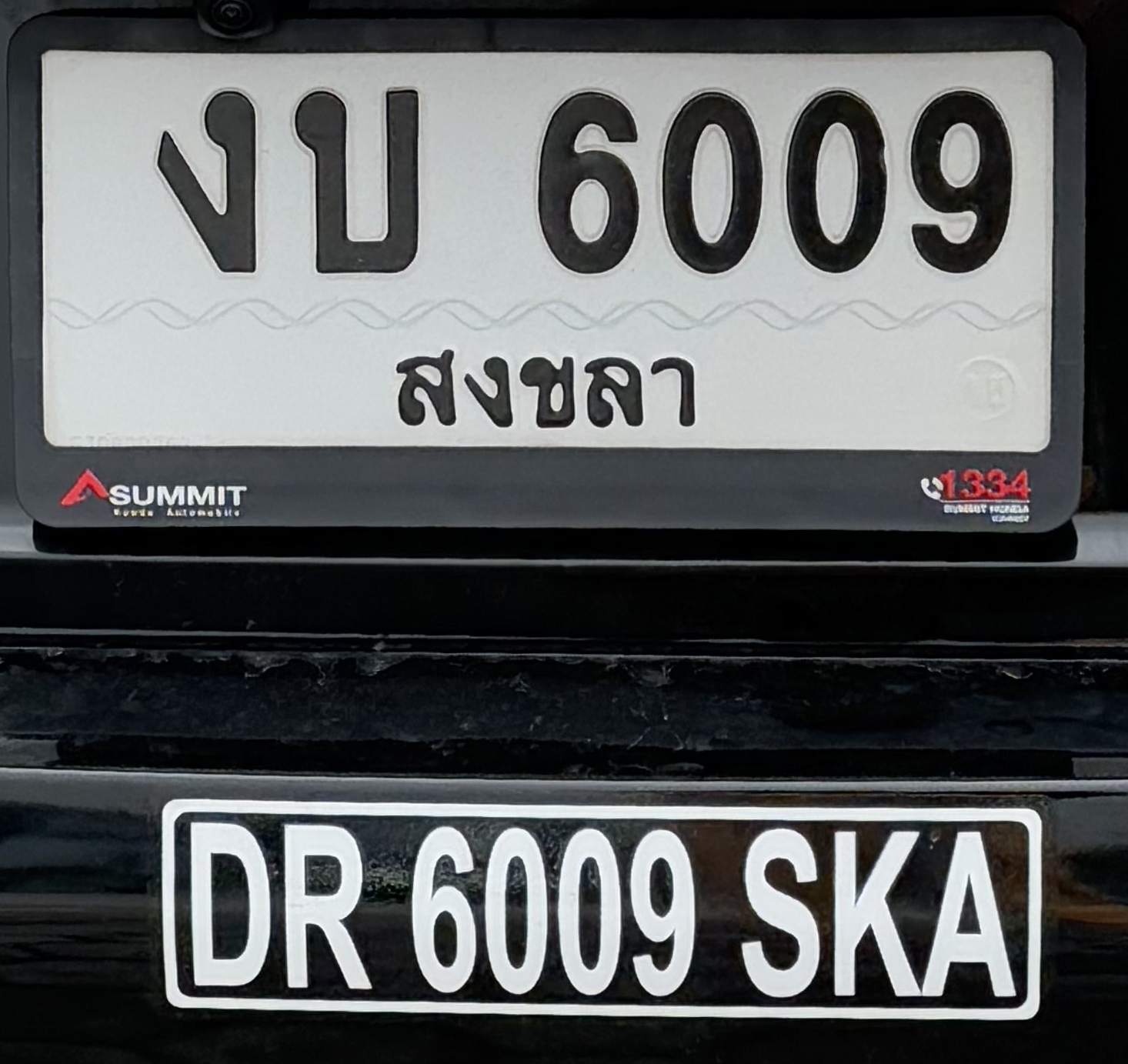
A normal Thailand number plate with a Malaysian translation below of the numberplate

As of 2008, plates enabling private cars to travel into neighbouring countries are available from the DLT upon request, for a fee. The prefix characters are translated via code-matching into two to three alphanumeric Roman characters based on Thai alphabetical order, with 7 Character plates being assigned unique codes for every possible combination of the first 3 characters that include letters ช, ฑ, ฒ, and ญ. The country name THAILAND is displayed in capital letters below the registration number, and the numerical provincial code is shown in the bottom right. The plates are black on white. They are required for transport into Malaysia, Singapore, Cambodia, Vietnam, Laos, Myanmar and China. However, they are to be removed upon returning to Thailand as they are illegal for use in Thailand.

The following table is a list of official translation of each Thai character to Latin characters for 6-digit Thai plates:

ก	ข	ค	ง	จ	ฉ	ช	ฌ	ฏ	ฐ	ณ	ด	ต
A	B	C	D	E	F	G	H	I	J	K	L	M
ถ	ท	ธ	น	บ	ป	ผ	พ	ฟ	ภ	ม	ย	ร
N	O	P	Q	R	S	T	U	V	W	X	Y	Z
ล	ว	ศ	ษ	ส	ห	ฬ	อ	ฮ	ญ	ฒ	ฆ	ซ
1	2	3	4	5	6	7	8	9	11	12	13	14
ญญ	ฒฒ	ฆฆ	ญฒ	ฒญ	ฆญ	ฆฒ						
V1	V2	V3	V4	V5	V6	V7						

Several examples of 6-digit Thai plates when translated to Latin plates are:

Thai	Latin
กล 2000	A1 2000
ดต 350	LM 350
ฒศ 45	123 45
ศฒ 5	312 5
ญญ 2626	V1 2626
ฆฒ 7777	V7 7777

The current international vehicle registration code for Thailand, adopted 1954, is "T".

=== Non-DLT plates ===
The DLT's authority does not cover vehicles used by the king, the Royal Thai Police, the Bureau of the Royal Household, or the Royal Thai Armed Forces. These vehicles are marked by plates governed by their respective organizations.

Vehicles owned by the Bureau of Royal Household have registration plates bearing the letters ร.ย.ล. (short for ราชยานยนต์หลวง, "royal motor vehicle") and a registration number, usually in white on a black background. Vehicles owned by the king usually bear standard registration plates but with the reserved series prefixes of "1ด" or "ดส".

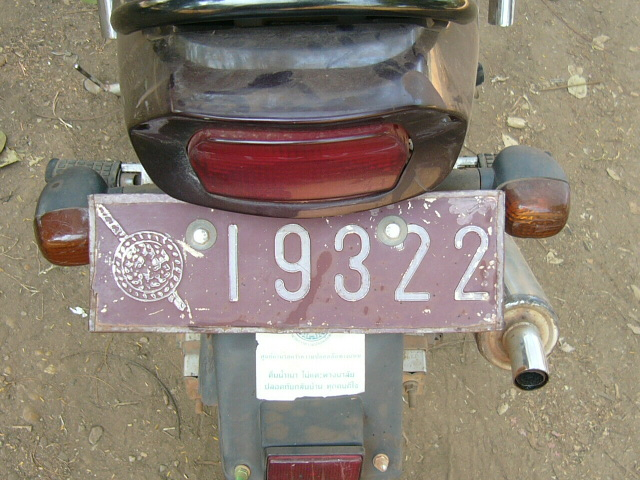

Vehicles owned by the Royal Thai Police usually have registration plates bearing the police emblem followed by the registration number. The colors are white on a maroon background.

Military vehicles have registration plates bearing their registration number preceded by the emblem of their respective military branch. Combat vehicles have red-on-white plates, while non-combat vehicles' plates are white-on-black.
