= Stone picker =

Agricultural machine

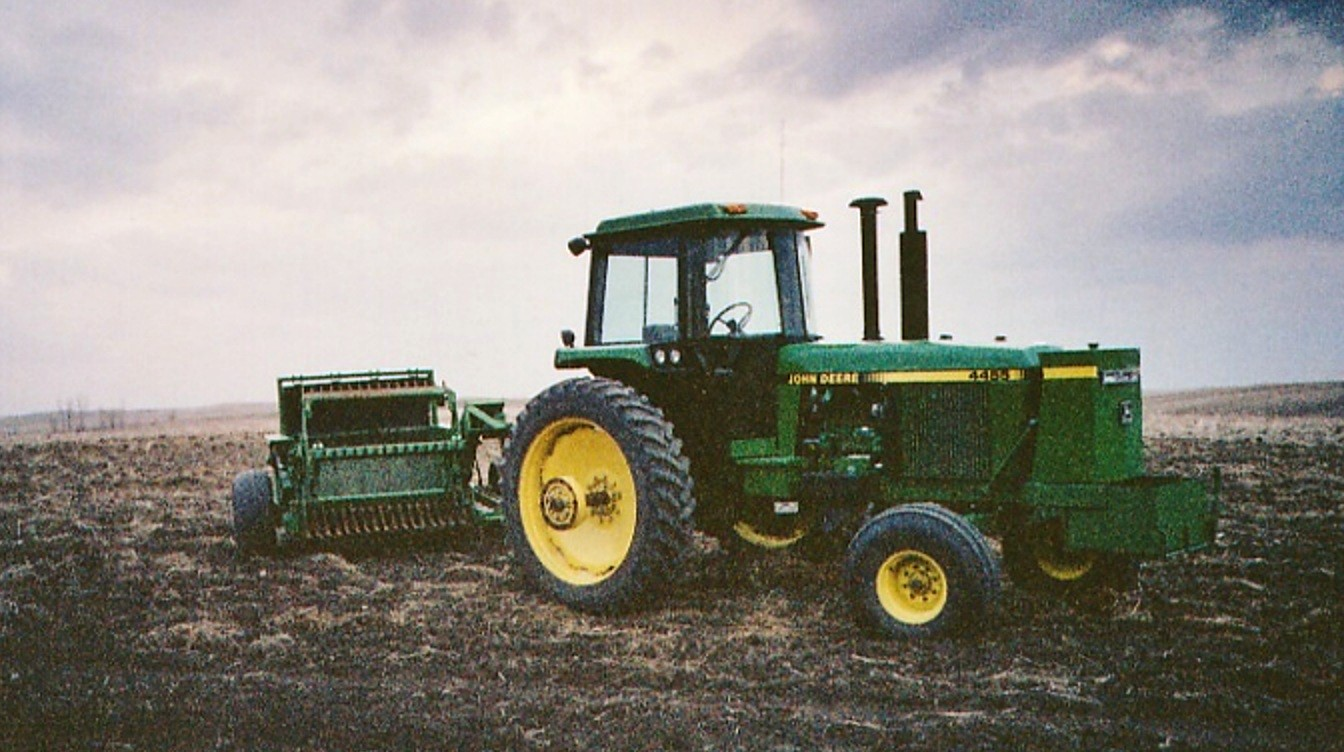
Tractor pulled rock picker in 2005

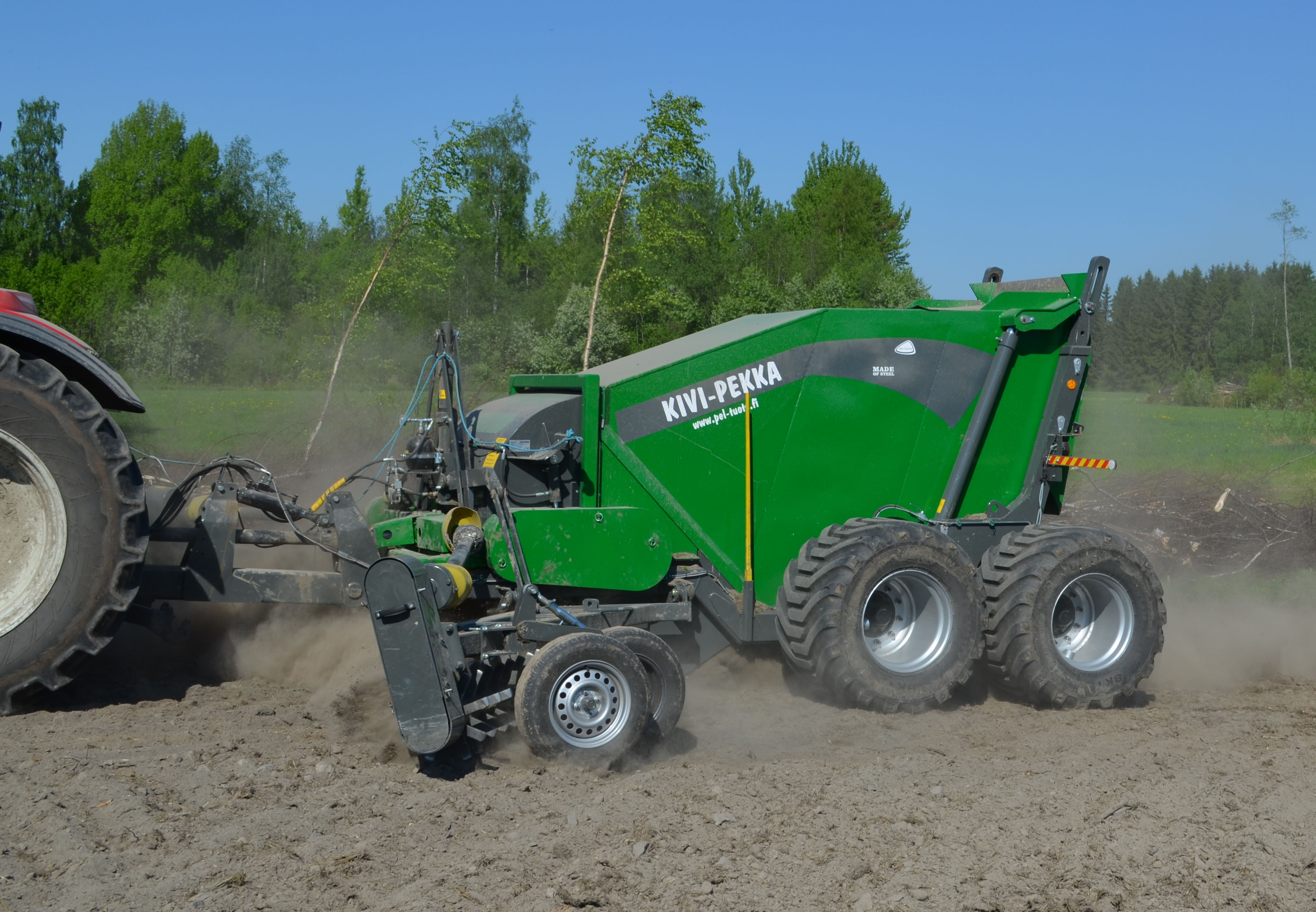
Tractor powered stone picker working at field.

A stone picker (or rock picker) is an implement to sieve through the top layer of soil to separate and collect rocks and soil debris from good topsoil. It is usually tractor-pulled. A stone picker is similar in function to a rock windrower (rock rake); a stone picker generally digs to greater depths to remove stones and rocks.

Stone pickers are used in farming and landscaping, where stones need to be removed from the soil and ground surface to prevent damage to other farm machinery (such as hay balers, combines, and mowers), improve the soil for crop production, or improve the appearance of the ground surface in preparation for a lawn or a golf course. Surface stones and large rocks often left from plowing can damage a hay bailer, the header or reciprocating knives on a combine, and blades on a rotary mower. Land with rock instead of fine soil are often less useful for crops. Thus, removing stones from the soil also ensures a more consistent yield. Additionally, using stone pickers is particularly useful for crops forming tubers (such as potatoes) in the ground.

A stone picker has digging teeth, a conveyor system, a sieve or screen, and a stone bin. The digging teeth are at the leading edge of the stone picker and removes soil, which is placed on the conveyor system. If the sieve is not combined with the conveyor system, the conveyor system transports the stones and large rocks to a bin or hopper for periodic dumping. Some stone pickers use a large tractor, generally over 100 horsepower, equipped with hydraulics and power take-off driven mechanisms. PTO pump driven equipment can use 60 horsepower tractors. The tractor's hydraulics control the depth to which the stone picker digs to excavate soil material; whereas, the PTO controls the movement of the conveyor and picking system.
