= Potato planter =

Machine for sowing seed potatoes

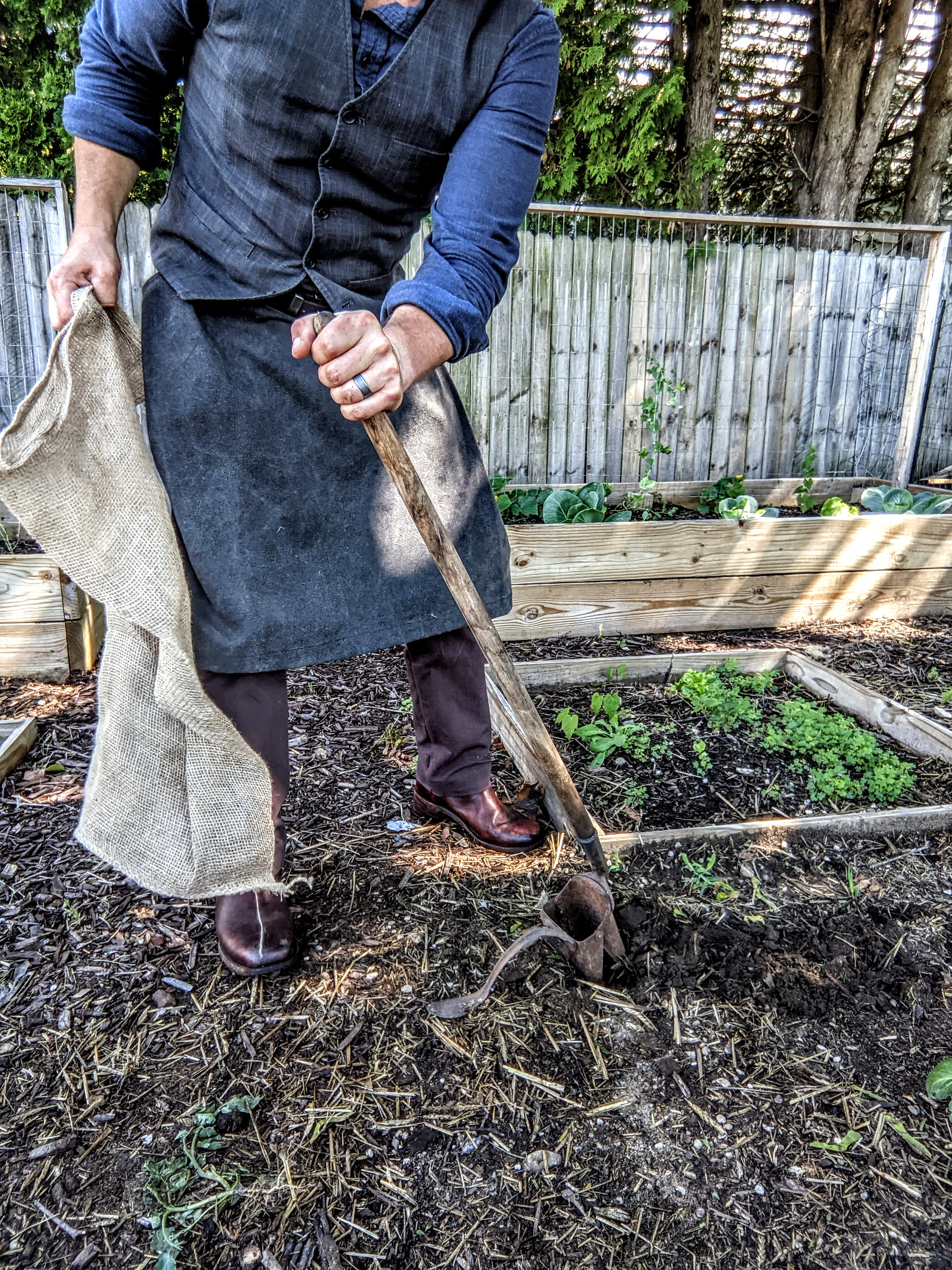
The foot-operated potato planter is pushed into the soil and opened to allow a segment of potato to drop into the hole

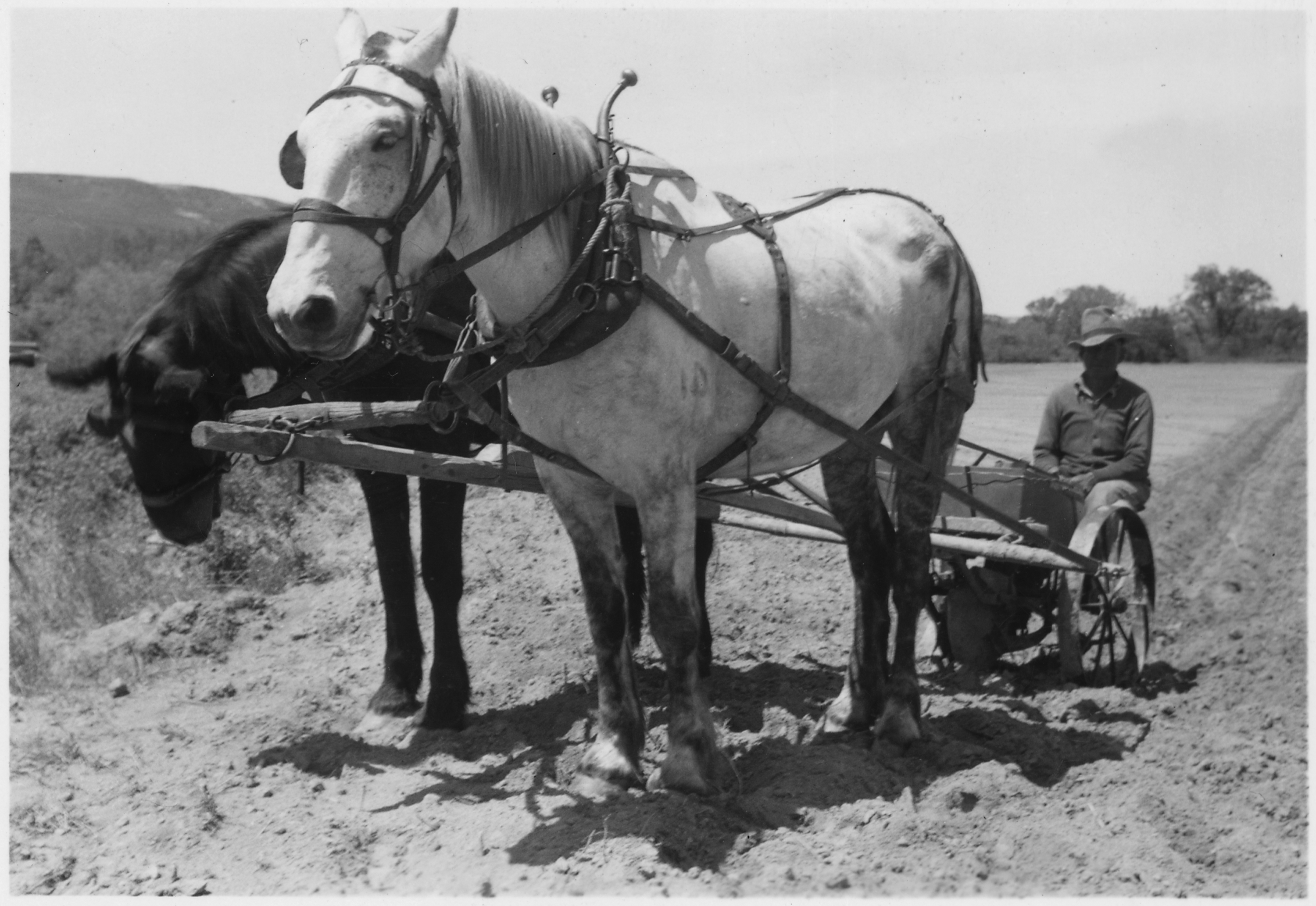
A horse-drawn potato planter

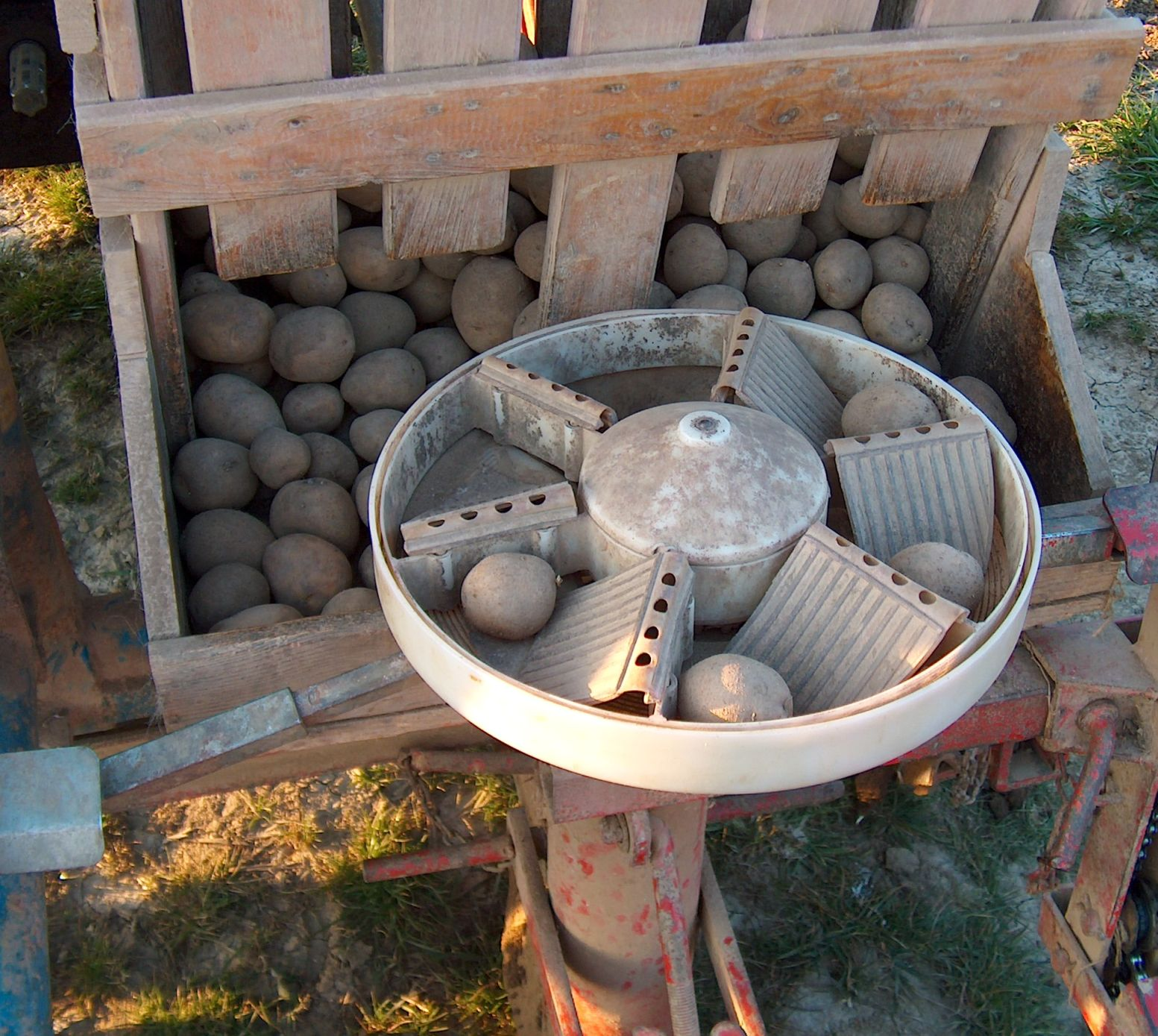
Half-automatic potato planter

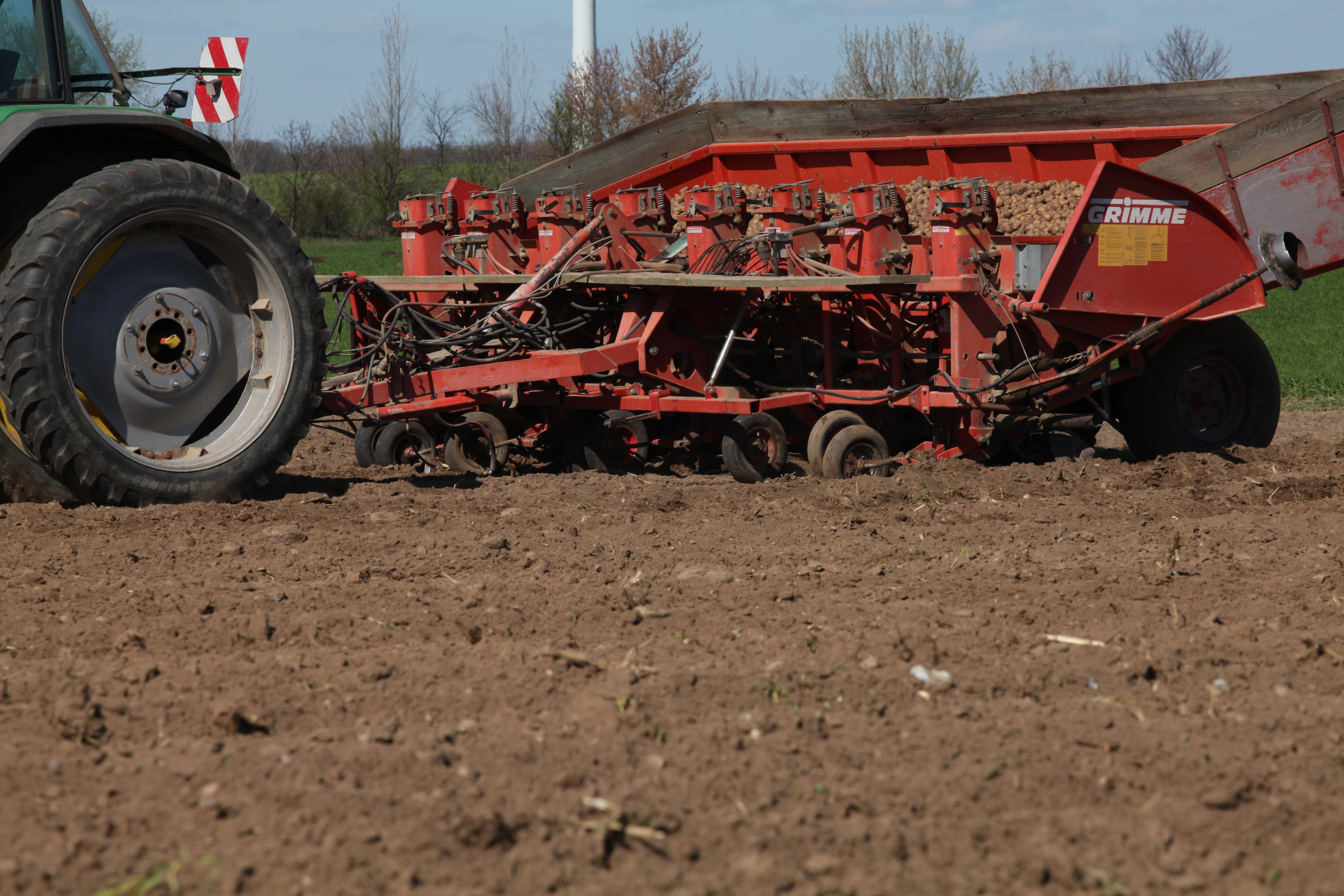
A modern 8-row trailed potato planter

A potato planter is a farm implement for sowing seed potatoes.

Hand potato planters, often referred to as foot-operated planters, are long-handled tools attached to a hinged "beak". The tuber is placed into the planter-beak and penetrated into the ground by means of stepping on the planter base with the foot. The handle is then angled, thus opening the base and allowing the tubing to be planted into the soil.

A manual planter is sometimes called a bell planter, which may have two farm hands sitting on the back whilst taking potatoes from a hopper. The length between potatoes is tolled by a bell, at the sound of which potatoes are thrown down tubes.

An automatic planter is hitched behind a farm tractor with a three-point linkage and towed. Cups lift seed potatoes from a hopper and drop them in tubes, planting up to eight drills at a time.
