= Shear grab =

A shear grab or also known as a silo grab or block cutter, is an implement used to cut blocks of silage from a silage pit/clamp. It is connected to a tractor via the three-point linkage or some are connected to a front end loader. It is powered by the tractors hydraulic system.

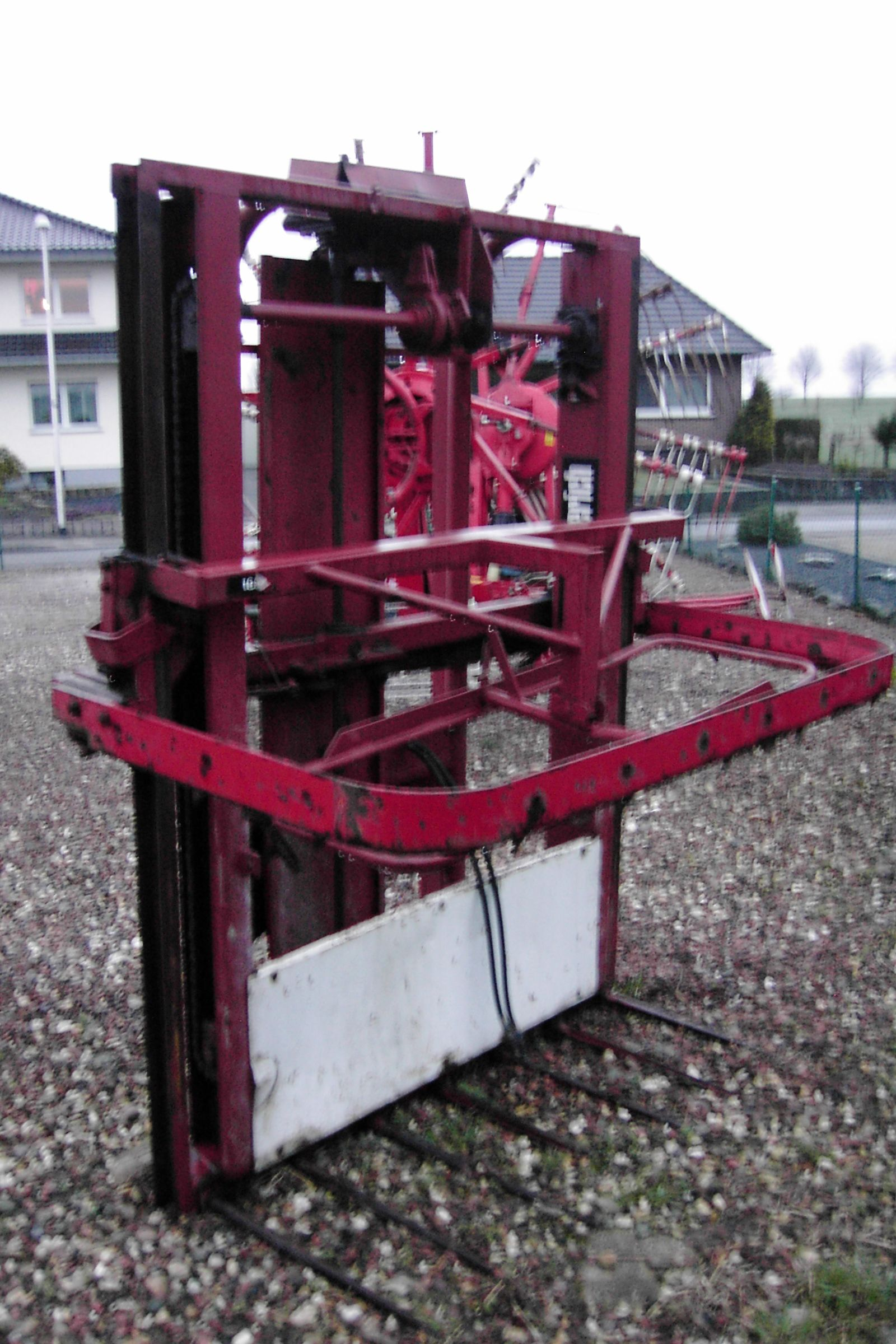
a block cutter

It usually has spikes on the bottom and a large rectangular section with blades on it that cut the block using two hydraulic rams. Before the invention of shear grabs farmers had to use silage knives, and a link box to get the silage into the livestock.

== See also ==
- List of agricultural machinery
