= Bale handlers =

Farm equipment used to transport large hay or straw bales

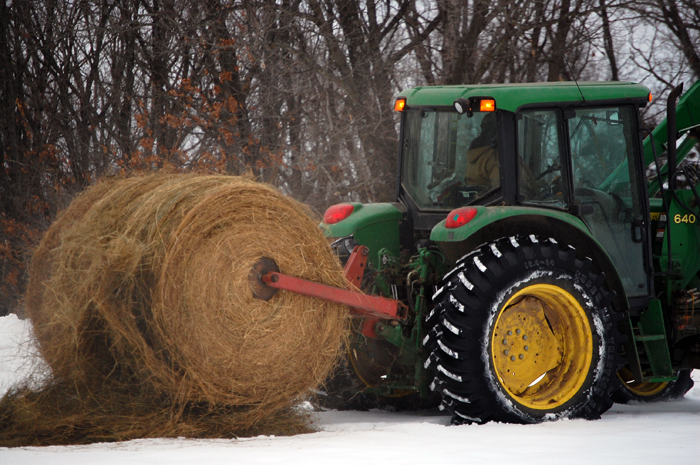
Tractor with a bale handling implement

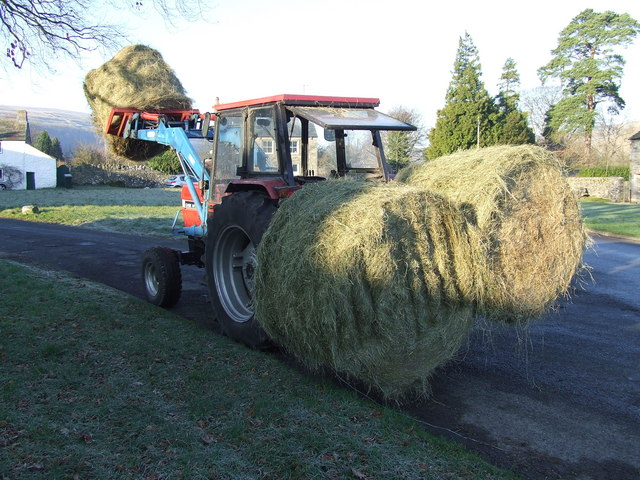
Tractor carrying bales

A bale handler is a class of farm implement used to transport hay or straw bales. They are often removable attachments for tractors, skidsteers, telehandlers, loaders, and even pickup trucks with special beds. They come in many different styles and formats. They can pinch, spear, hook, and fork the bales, one or several at a time. The type of bale handling attachment will be built to handle the particular size and type of bale.

Bale spears can often move both round and square large bales. Bale squeezes are used with bales that are wrapped for silage, large piles of large and small square bales, as well as a special squeeze that can be used to unroll large round bales for winter feeding. Bale handlers with hooks are used to move large and small bales.

When connected to a tractor via the three-point linkage or front-loader.

== See also ==
- Baler
- List of agricultural machinery
