= Farm truck =

Vehicle designated for agricultural use

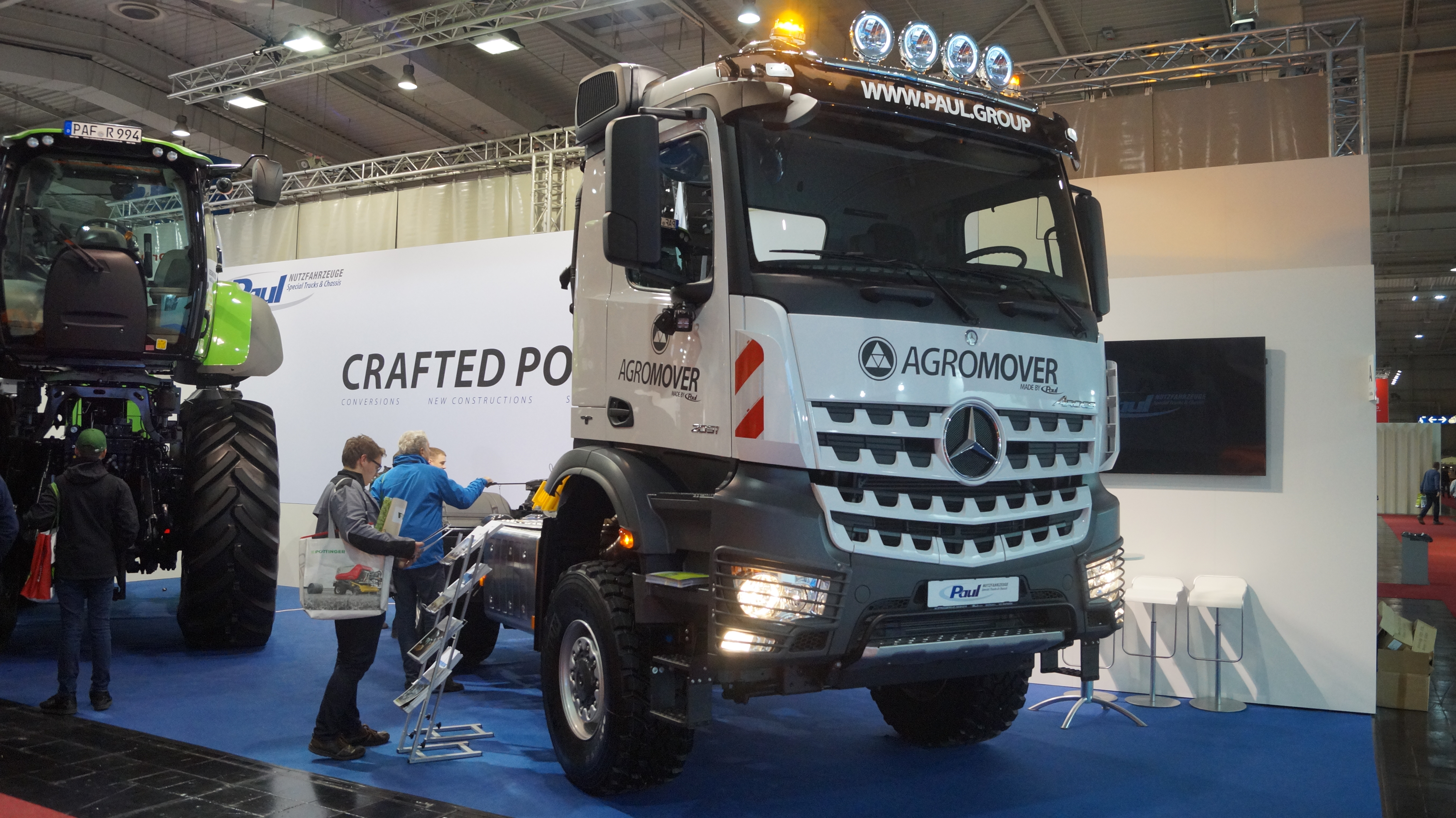
Paul Agro Mover 4x4 at Agritechnica 2017 in Hannover, Germany.

A farm truck also called agriculture truck is a vehicle designated for agricultural use and may include anything from small pick-up trucks or full size trucks.

Agro Trucks are considered to be a future replacement for traditional farm tractors because of the versatile platform of a tractor truck, which can work in fields with comfort and haul heavy loads on roads with higher speeds compared to the farm tractor. Agro trucks traditional industrial trucks equipped with agriculture tires, bigger suspensions, drawbar coupling, tow hitch, three point hitch and fifth wheel coupling.

With growing farm land size, operators and owners focus on reducing the cost of equipment and fuel consumption. Having an agro truck reduces the equipment count to half because the same equipment is used to farm and transport goods as a tractor can only be used to farm, but transportation by a tractor is difficult and agro trucks are welcomed by the laws and other road users.

== Manufacturers ==
- MAN Truck & Bus
- Daimler Truck
- Tatra
- Paul Nutzfahrzeuge GmbH

== See also ==
- Tractor Unit
- Ringfeder
- Drawbar
- Tractor
- Agricultural machinery
- List of agricultural machinery
