= Hog oiler =

Mechanical device for applying oil to hogs

Hog oiler patent image U.S. patent 1,241,023

A hog oiler was a mechanical device employed on farms to be used by hogs to provide relief from insects and offer skin protection. It consisted of a reservoir to hold oil, and a means to distribute the oil onto the hog, often via grooved wheels or cylinders. Hogs seeking relief would rub up against a wheel (or cylinder) causing it to rotate and dispense oil onto their bodies.

== History ==
In the late 1800s and early 1900s hog lice and hog cholera could prove devastating to livestock producers and the hog oiler was seen as one way to combat the problem. The first known patent for a hog oiler device was issued in 1902 by the U.S. Patent Office, however the era of innovation for this device was mainly the years 1913–1923. According to Goodbye Mr. Louse, a book by Robert Rauhauser, there may have been as many as 157 different patented models of hog oilers, but collectors today estimate there could have been as many as 600 manufacturers, most going unpatented.

Prices for hog oilers would range anywhere from four dollars for a small model to twelve dollars and even higher for larger ones with more features. The same companies that manufactured the oilers would often sell special medicated oil to be used with the device, offering further protection. Many farmers however simply chose to use recycled oil or made their own cheaper versions. The U.S. government, while being willing to issue patents, suggested that the oilers might be less than effective, according to collector Bob Coates in Farm Collector magazine. "They (the government) recommended mopping or dipping (the hogs) instead," said Coats.

Companies throughout the Midwestern U.S., such as Lisle Manufacturing of Clarinda, Iowa, offered farmers and hog producers a variety of styles and sizes including fence-mounted, stand-alone, walk-through and ratchet-governed. However, the most common were double-wheel models known as Colubians and Sipes. Often made of cast iron, the early hog oilers could be quite heavy, with some models weighing as much as 150 pounds. Later models from the 1920s onward would mostly be constructed of cheaper, lighter steel and sheet metal. Other known manufacturers of hog oilers included the National Oiler Company of Richmond, Indiana, Rowe Manufacturing, Galesburg, Illinois, and Starbuck Manufacturing, Illinois Implement Company, and O.H.C. Manufacturing, all of Peoria, Illinois.

== Collectibles ==
World War II led to a small but growing collectors' market for hog oilers today. The cast iron models are considered the most desirable antiques since many originals were gathered up in war scrap iron drives and destroyed. Hog oiler collectors come from all locations and ages, some as young as 11 years old. Generally the "hog belt" of the upper Midwest provides the majority of hog oiler finds today—states such as Iowa, Illinois, Indiana, Nebraska and parts of Kansas and Missouri. Prices paid by collectors can vary widely, based on size, functions, and condition of the machine. Smaller hog oilers can be purchased for sometimes thirty dollars or less, while the rarest models can have asking prices in the many thousands of dollars. A small cast iron "wheel" type hog oiler that appeared nearly unused was featured on the History Channel program Pawn Stars on August 8, 2011. It sold for $100.

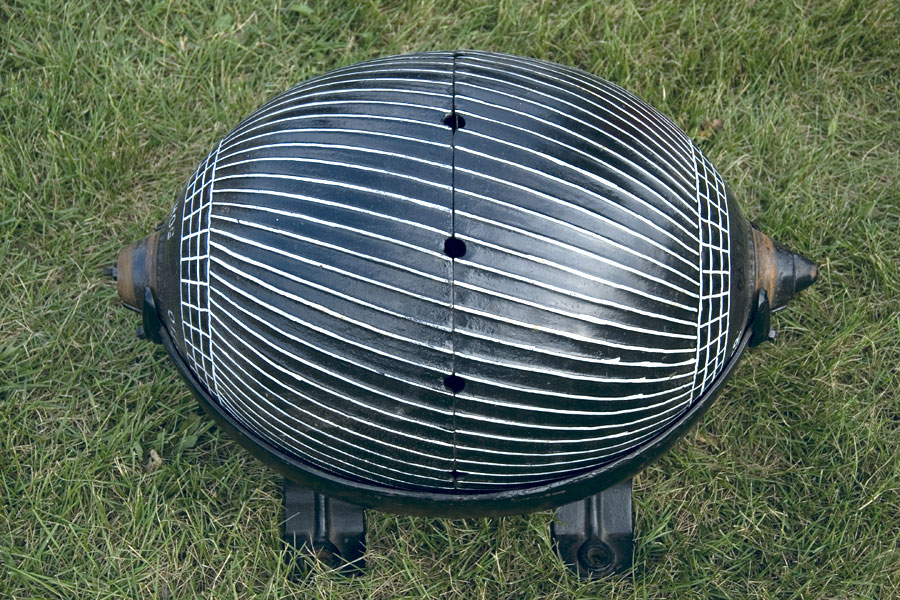
Antique "watermelon type" hog oiler.
