= Destoner =

Machine that removes stones from soil ridges

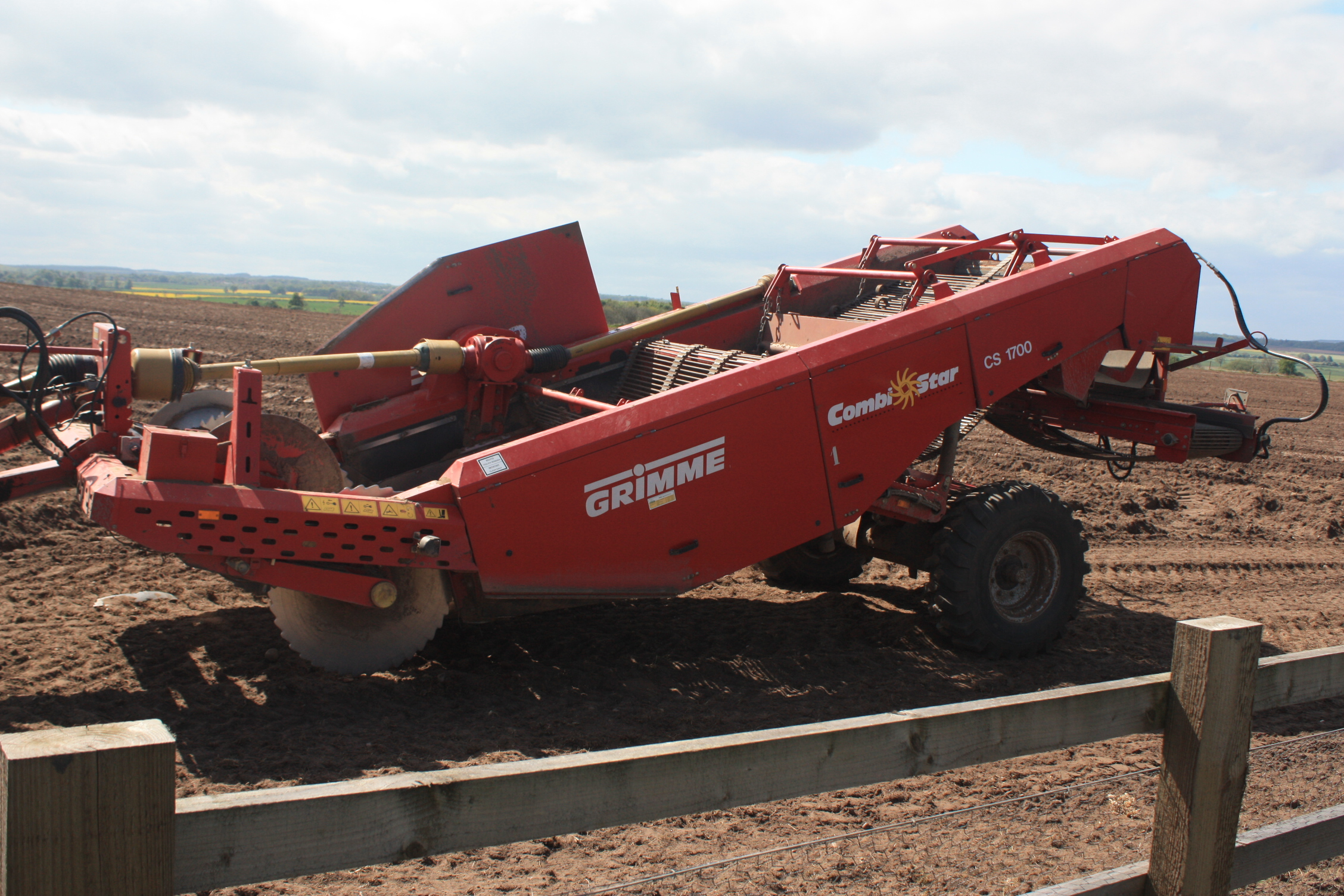
Side view of a destoner

A destoner is a machine that removes stones and clods from soil ridges and moves them to the furrow so that the ridges are free from stones. This also helps when harvesting in wet conditions as the harvester can drive on a row of stones which helps improve traction.

They remove stone using a series of webs (between two and five webs). The stones stay on the web and the clay falls through it. The stones travel through the machine and the bigger stones fall into a boulder box and the smaller stones fall onto a cross conveyor and in turn fall into a trench. On the next pass the tractor tramps these stones down.

Destoners are usually fitted with steerable wheels which makes them more maneuverable on headlands. Some are fitted with hydraulic leveling.
