= Chillcuring =

Grain ventilating process

Chillcuring is a grain ventilating process, especially for fresh-harvested shelled corn.

== Process ==
As described in inventions of Sylvester L. Steffen, chillcuring is an electrical ventilating process that facilitates the after-ripening of bulk stored seeds. The ventilation process is controlled by monitoring the wet-bulb temperature of air around the grain (as measured by evaporative cooling), by which the grain is brought to equilibrium moisture and temperature with atmospheric air. Seed dormancy is better maintained at cooler (chill) atmospheric temperatures, and grain weight and seed vigor are better preserved. The after-ripening of seeds is a biochemical process of carbohydrate/protein stabilization associated with the release of water from the seeds. Water, as well as carbon dioxide, is a good absorber of infrared light. The process uses "grainlamps" which produce infrared, which is readily absorbed by water vapor in the air under high humidity conditions.

== History ==
The Steffen Patents were at issue in federal lawsuits in Minnesota, Indiana and Iowa. The validity of the Steffen Process Patents was upheld. The chillcuring process was marketed from the 1960s into the late 1990s by Harvestall Industries, Inc., an agribusiness of the former and now deceased Speaker of the Iowa House of Representatives, Vincent B. Steffen.
