= Potato harvester =

Harvesting machine

Potato harvesters are machines that harvest potatoes. They work by lifting the potatoes from the bed using a share. Soil and crop are transferred onto a series of webs where the loose soil is sieved out. The potatoes are moved towards the back of the harvester on to a separation unit and then (on human-operated machines) to a picking table where people pick out the stones, clods, and haulms (stems or stalks) by hand. The potatoes then go on to a side elevator and into a trailer or a potato box.

== Types ==
=== Potato spinner ===
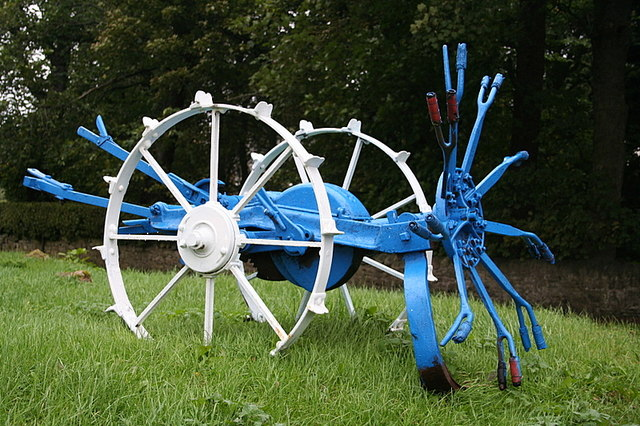
A potato spinner

A potato spinner is connected to a tractor through the three-point linkage. Older machines were drawn by horse and were driven by a ground drive. It works by a flat piece of metal which runs horizontal to the ground lifting the potatoes up and a large wheel with spokes on it called a reel pushing the clay and potatoes out to the side. The potatoes are then gathered by hand, placed into containers and transported from the field for further packaging.

The potato spinner is becoming obsolete because modern potato harvesting equipment eliminates manual gathering of potatoes and leaves fewer potatoes in the soil.

=== Haulm topper ===
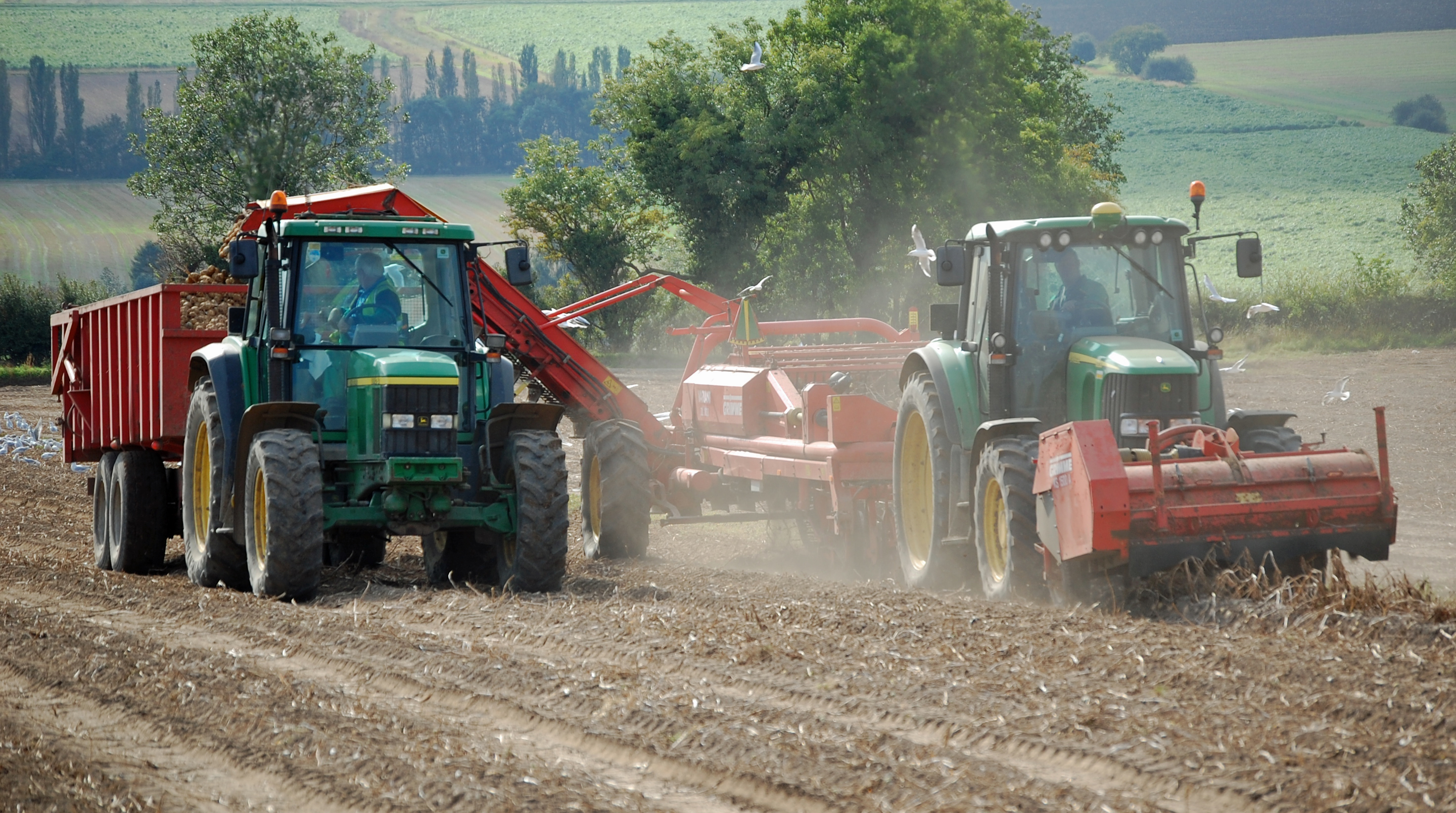
A tractor with a front-mounted haulm topper and a trailed potato harvester

A haulm topper is an agricultural machine that cuts potato stems (haulms) before potatoes are harvested. It is like a flail mower but has the profile of the potato drills. Modern potato farmers often mount a haulm topper on the front of the tractor and have a trailed potato harvester towed behind the tractor. Toppers can also be rear-mounted.
