= Art's Way =

US agricultural machinery manufacturer

- Type: Public
- Traded as: Nasdaq: ARTW
- Industry: Manufacturer
- Founded: 1956
- Headquarters: Armstrong, Iowa
- Area served: US and 9 other countries
- Key people: Marc H. McConnell (Chairman); David King (Chief Executive Officer)
- Products: Agricultural machinery; Grinder-mixers; Manure spreaders; Sugar beet harvesters; Dump & forage trailers; Land graders; Bale spreaders; Feed blowers; Modular buildings; Machine cutting tools
- Revenue: ▲$25.0 million (2021); ▼$22.4 million (2020)
- Net income: ▲$213,000 (2021); ▼$2.1 million loss (2020)
- Number of employees: 150 (2022)
- Website: www.artsway.com

Art's Way Manufacturing is an American producer of agricultural machinery, modular buildings and cutting tools under the brand names Art's Way, Art's Way Scientific and American Carbide Tool. The firm previously manufactured OEM feed blowers sold by Case New Holland.

== History ==
Iowa farmer Arthur Luscombe (1922–2008) founded Art's Way Manufacturing in 1956 to produce and sell a power take-off powered grinder-mixer he had developed on his farm near Dolliver. By 1959, the business was manufacturing OEM grinder-mixers for Massey Ferguson, Owatonna / Gehl and International Harvester.

In 1974, Art's Way listed as a public company by initial public offering with Nasdaq code ARTW.

Following the 1994 sale of his Marc McConnell Tractor business to AGCO, Ward McConnell purchased Logan Falls based Logan Potato Equipment. In 1996, he merged the Logan enterprise with a then financially troubled Art's Way and joined the board of directors. In 2002, McConnell became Chairman, a role taken up by his son Marc in 2015.

=== Acquisitions and new businesses ===
	Armstrong Rim & Wheel established to build wheels for grinder-mixers. (Note: Sold 1980s)
1966	Silamix mixer-wagons acquired. WeighTronix weighing scale developed to fit the mixer-wagons, grinder-mixers and for third party applications. (Note: WeighTronix sold 1980s. Mixer-wagons not part of 2022 product range)
1980s	Sunmaster mowers and shredders from Rotech. (Note: Not part of 2022 product range)
1980s	Heath Farm Equipment sugar beet harvesters and toppers.
1980s	Range of potato harvesters including the John Deere patent wheel harvester.
1990s	Stationary and mobile Peerless roller mills.
1990s	Eversman land planes, levellers, ditchers, scrapers and cultivators.
1996	Logan potato equipment (Note: By 2016 the business was part of Tristeel Manufacturing)
1990s	DMI grain wagon
1990s	Farm Tool grain drills, Speedy bean cutters and dump wagons.
2000	Landstar / KanAm pull type graders.
2005	Steel pressure vessel manufacturing begins in Dubuque, Iowa.
2006	Scientific division established in Monona, Iowa to manufacture modular laboratories and other buildings.
2007	MillerPro and Badger forage boxes, forage blowers, hay rakes, and mergers. (Note: Dropped from strategic product range in 2020 and stocks written down in value)
2008	Facility opened at Salem, South Dakota to manufacture grain augers. (Note: Location no longer listed for Art's Way in 2022)
2010	Roda manure spreaders
2010	M&W balers from Alamo Group. (Note: Product line discontinued by 2018)
2010	Facility in West Union, Iowa.
2012	Universal Harvester reels for combine harvesters / swathers at cost $3 million plus 5,000 Art's Way shares.
2013	AgroTrend distribution business, and manufacturing of dump carts and snow blowers. Based in Clifford, Ontario. From Rojac Industries Inc. (Note: Snow blowers not part of 2022 product range)
2013	Ohio Metal Co Inc American Carbide brand machine tooling in Canton, Ohio, Ohio for a cost of $3,172,000. (Note: Products include single point brazed carbide tipped tools, and polycrystalline diamond / cubic boron nitride inserts.)

== Awards ==
- 2015 - Award of Distinction from the Modular Building Institute for transgenic swine facility at Iowa State University's Zumwalt Station Farm in Ames, Iowa.
- 2014 - Award of Distinction from the Modular Building Institute for biomedical research building in California
- 2008 - Fortune Small Business Magazine 57th best small cap company in America.
- 2008 - Forbes magazine 54th best small company in America.
