= M&W Gear Co =

American agricultural machinery company

M&W
- Industry: Agricultural Machinery
- Founded: 1948, Gibson City, Illinois
- Founder: Elmo R. Meiners and Arthur J. Warsaw
- Products: Tune-Up kits Tillage Equipment Grain Wagons
- Parent: Rhino AG

M&W Gear Co was formed in 1948 by Elmo R. Meiners and Arthur J. Warsaw.

The company started when the two men began producing kits to increase the speed on Farmall tractors. Soon after, they began building custom pistons that created more horsepower and an independent live pto. In 1954, Warsaw sold his half of the company after developing a dynometer, later creating A&W dynometers.The company continued growth resulted in a move to a large facility in Gibson City, IL, in 1955. In 1981 Meiners sued Warsaw and A&W for false advertising. Meiners left the company in the 1990's.

Alamo Group bought M&W Gear Co. in April 1995 and shortened the name to M&W. The company was later merged into the Rhino AG brand, who further sold off the round baler line to Art's Way in 2010. Currently, Rhino is still using the M&W name.

== See also ==
- Art's Way
