= Pelletizing =

Compressing a material to form a pellet

Pelletizing is the process of compressing or molding a material into the shape of a pellet. A wide range of different materials are pelletized including chemicals, iron ore, animal compound feed, plastics (nurdles), waste materials, and more. The process is considered an excellent option for the storage and transport of said materials. The technology is widely used in the powder metallurgy engineering and medicine industries.

== Iron ore ==
Edward W Davis of the University of Minnesota is credited for devising the process of pelletizing iron ore.

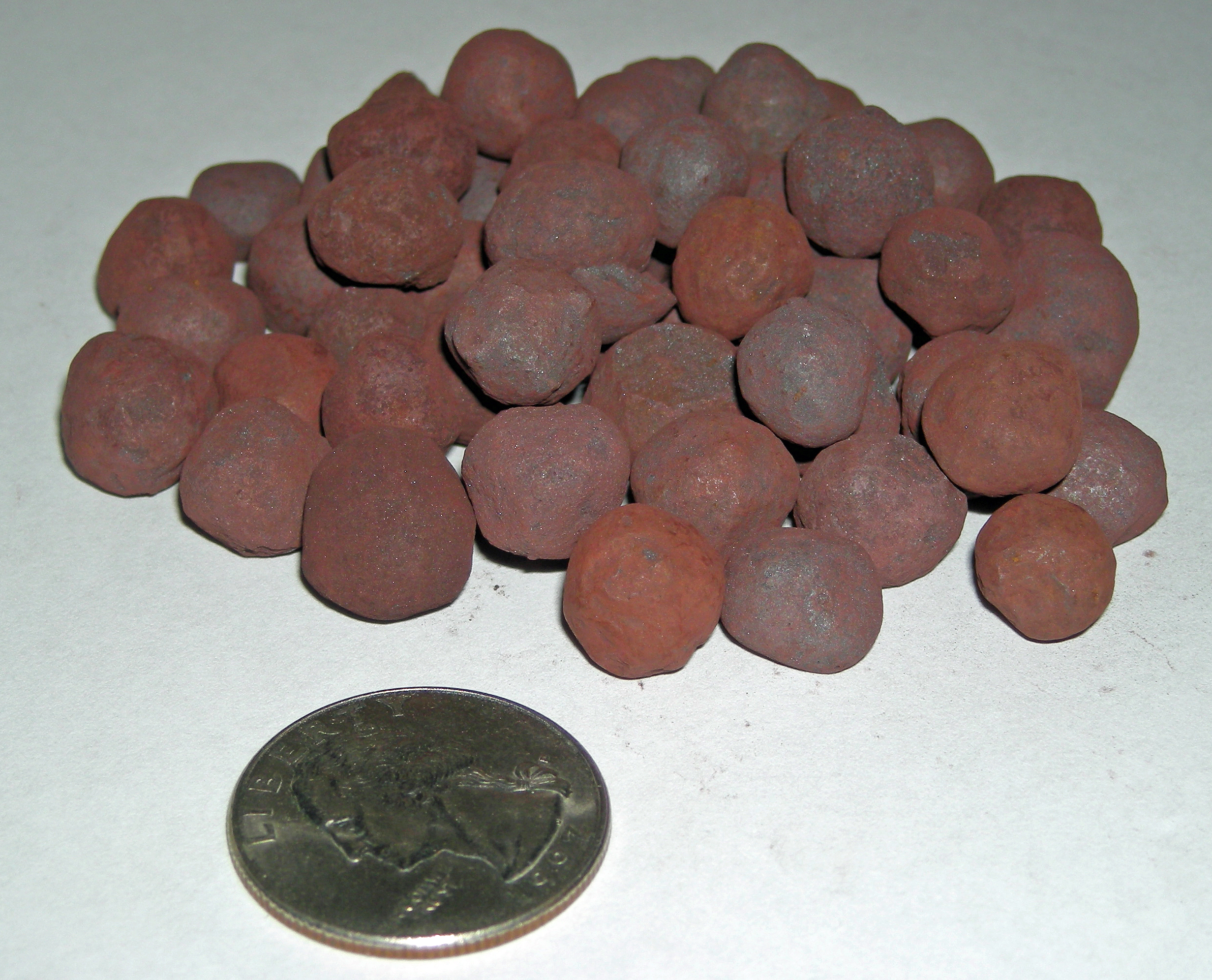
Processed Taconite pellets as used in the steelmaking industry, with a US quarter shown to scale.

Pelletizing iron ore is undertaken due to the excellent physical and metallurgical properties of iron ore pellets. Iron ore pellets are spheres of typically 6–16 mm (0.24–0.63 in) to be used as raw material for blast furnaces. They typically contain 64–72% Fe and various additional material adjusting the chemical composition and the metallurgic properties of the pellets. Typically limestone, dolomite and olivine is added and Bentonite is used as binder.

The process of pelletizing combines mixing of the raw material, forming the pellet and a thermal treatment baking the soft raw pellet to hard spheres. The raw material is rolled into a ball, then fired in a kiln or in travelling grate to sinter the particles into a hard sphere.

The configuration of iron ore pellets as packed spheres in the blast furnace allows air to flow between the pellets, decreasing the resistance to the air that flows up through the layers of material during the smelting. The configuration of iron ore powder in a blast furnace is more tightly packed and restricts the air flow. This is the reason that iron ore is preferred in the form of pellets rather than in the form of finer particles. The quality of the iron ore pellets depends on different factors, which include feed particle size, amount of water used, disc rotating speed, inclination angle of the disc bottom, residence time in the disc as well as the quality and quantity of the binder(s) used.

=== Preparation ===
Additional materials are added to the iron ore (pellet feed) to meet the requirements of the final pellets. This is done by placing the mixture in the pelletizer, which can hold different types of ores and additives, and mixing to adjust the chemical composition and the metallurgic properties of the pellets. In general, the following stages are included in this period of processing: concentration / separation, homogenization of the substance ratios, milling, classification, increasing thickness, homogenization of the pulp and filtering.

=== Formation ===
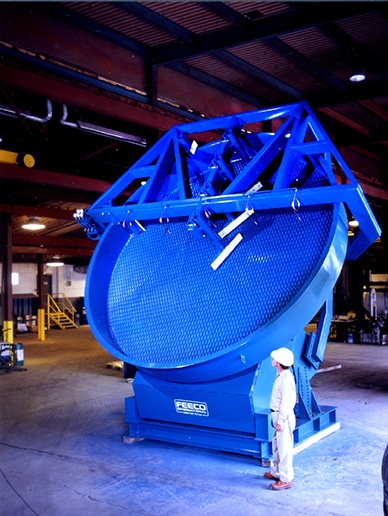
Disc Pelletizer

The formation of raw iron ore pellets, also known as pelletizing, has the objective of producing pellets in an appropriate band of sizes and with mechanical properties high usefulness during the stresses of transference, transport, and use. For example, waste materials are ground before being heated and introduced into a press for compression. Both mechanical force and thermal processes are used to produce the correct pellet properties. From an equipment point of view there are two alternatives for industrial production of iron ore pellets: the drum and the pelletizing disk.

=== Thermal processing ===
In order to confer to the pellets high resistance metallurgic mechanics and appropriate characteristics, the pellets are subjected to thermal processing, which involves stages of drying, preheating, firing, after-firing and cooling. The duration of each stage and the temperature that the pellets are subjected to have a strong influence on the final product quality.

== Pharmaceutical industry ==
In the field of medicine, pelletization is referred to as the agglomeration process that converts fine powders or granules into more or less spherical pellets. The use of the technology increased because it allows for the controlled release of dosage form, which also lead to a uniform absorption with less mucosal irritation within the gastrointestinal tract. There are different pelletization processes applied in the pharmaceutical industry and these typically vary according to the bonding forces. Some examples of the processes include balling, compression, and spray congealing. Balling is similar to the wet (or green) pelletization used in the iron ore industry.

== Animal feeds ==
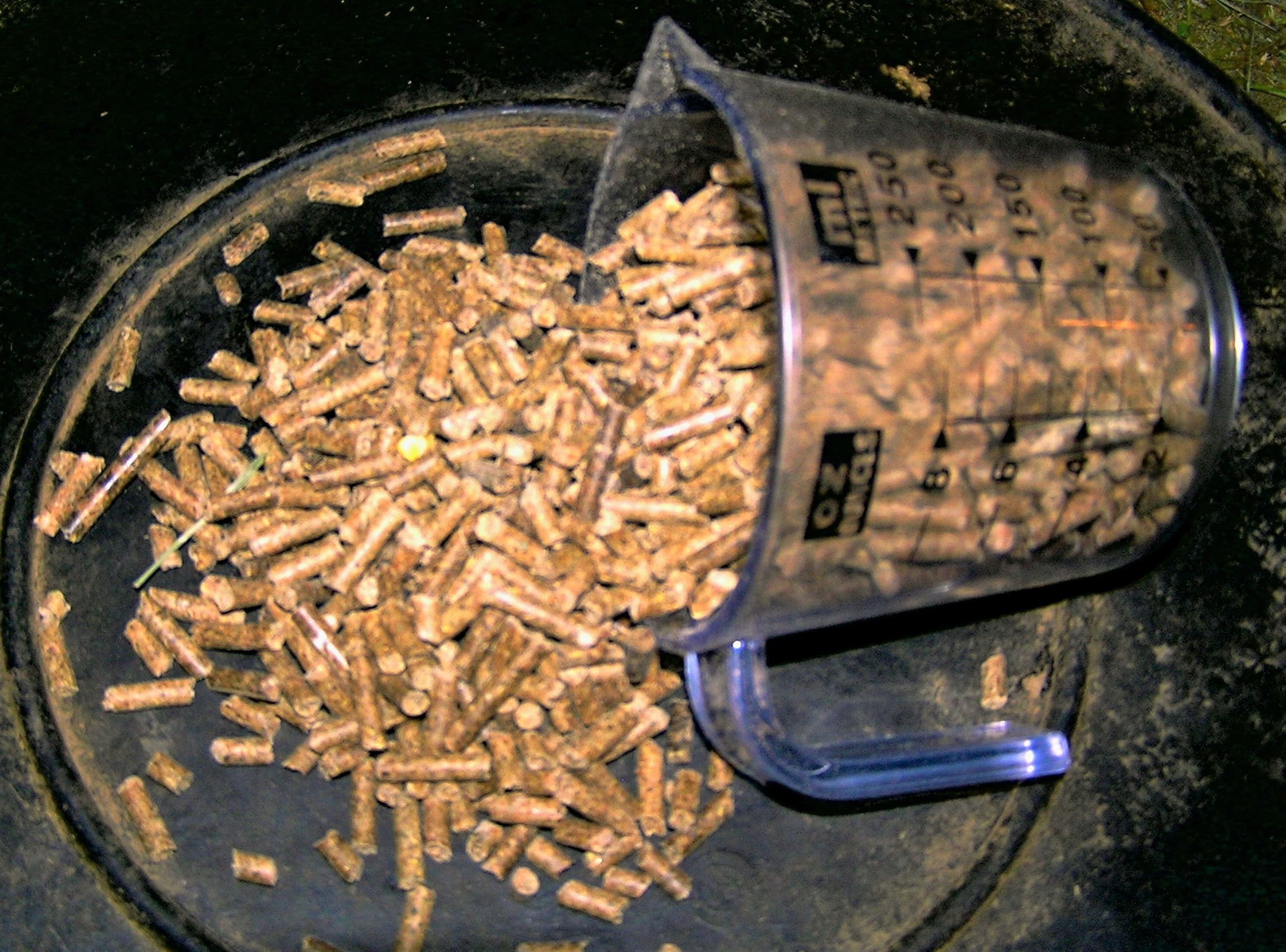
Animal feed pellets

Pelletizing of animal feeds can result in pellets from 1.2 mm (0.047 in) (shrimp feeds), through to 3–4 mm (0.12–0.16 in) (poultry feeds) up to 8–10 mm (0.31–0.39 in) (stock feeds). The pelletizing of stock feed is done with the pellet mill machinery, which is done in a feed mill.

Feed ingredients are normally first hammered to reduce the particle size of the ingredients. Ingredients are then batched, and then combined and mixed thoroughly by a feed mixer. Once the feed has been prepared to this stage the feed is ready to be pelletized.

Pelletizing is done in a pellet mill, where feed is normally conditioned and thermal-treated in the fitted conditioners of a pellet mill. The feed is then pushed through the holes and exit the pellet mill as pelleted feed.

== Wood ==
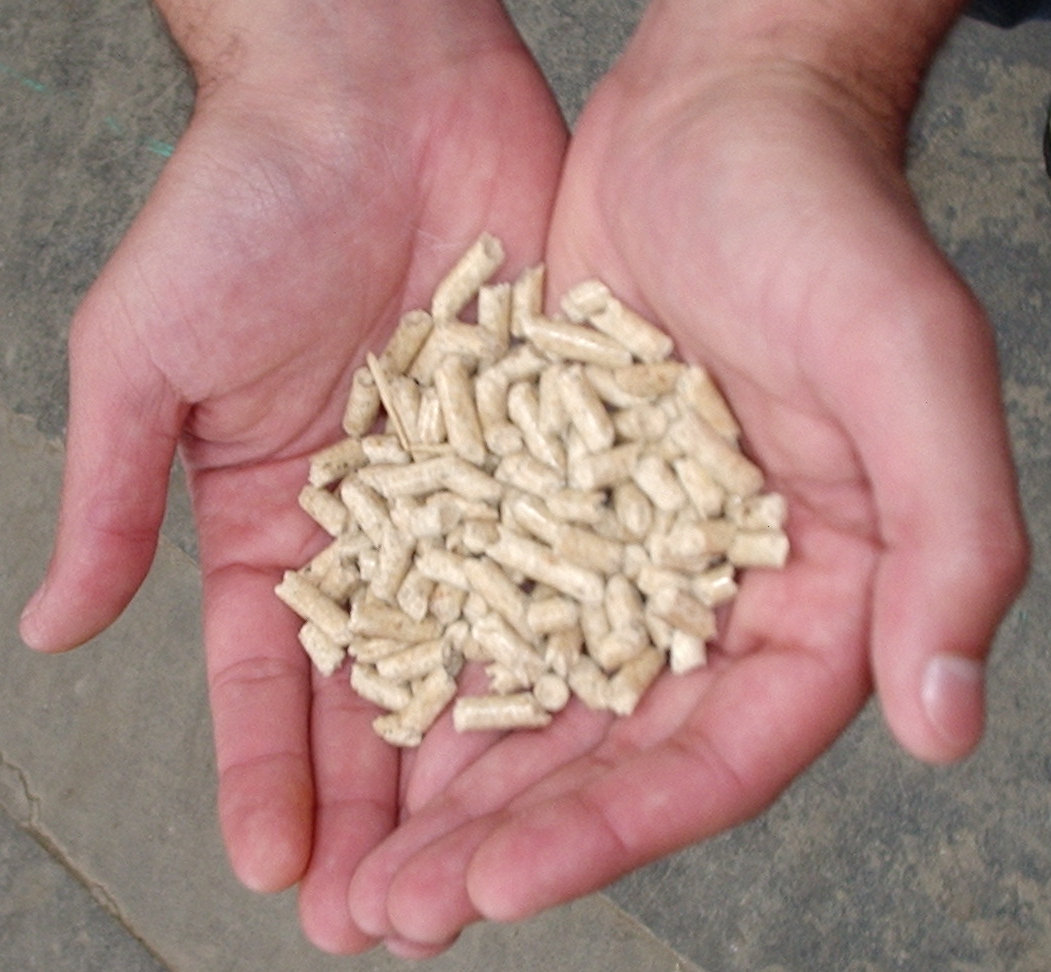
Wood pellets

Wood pellets made by compressing sawdust or other ground woody materials are used in a variety of energy and non-energy applications. In the energy sector, wood pellets are often used to replace coal with power plants such as Drax, in England, replacing most of their coal use with woody pellet. As sustainably harvested wood does not lead to a long-term increase in atmospheric carbon dioxide levels, wood fuels are considered to be a low-carbon form of energy. Wood pellets are also used for domestic and commercial heating either in the form of automated boilers or pellet stoves. Compared to other fuels made from wood, pellets have the advantage of higher energy density, simpler handling as it flows similar to grain, and low moisture.

Concerns have been raised about the short-term carbon balance of wood pellet production, particularly if it is driving the harvesting of old or mature harvests that would otherwise not be logged. Areas of concern include the inland rainforests of British Columbia These claims are contested by the pellet and forest industries.

After pelleting, the pellets are cooled with a cooler to bring the temperature of the feed down. Other post pelleting applications include post-pelleting conditioning, sorting via a screen, and maybe coating if required.

== Plastics ==
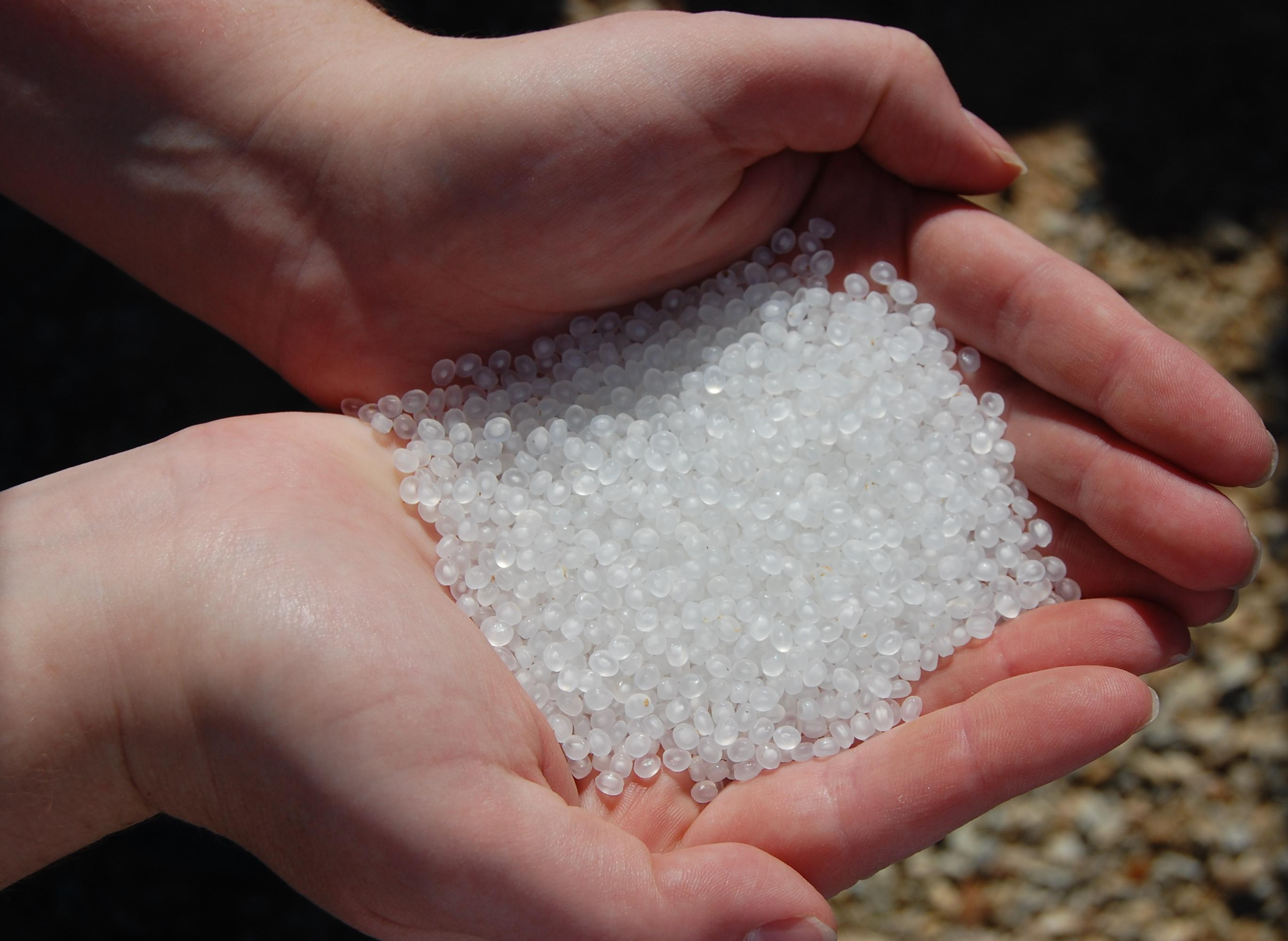
Plastic pellets

Plastic pellets, known as "nurdles", are used in the plastics industry. They can pollute rivers and oceans when spilled, as birds and fish eat them mistaking them for eggs.

== See also ==
- Blast furnace
- Iron ore
- Pellet (disambiguation)
- Pellet mill
- Prill
