= Nurdle (bead) =

Pre-production plastic pellets

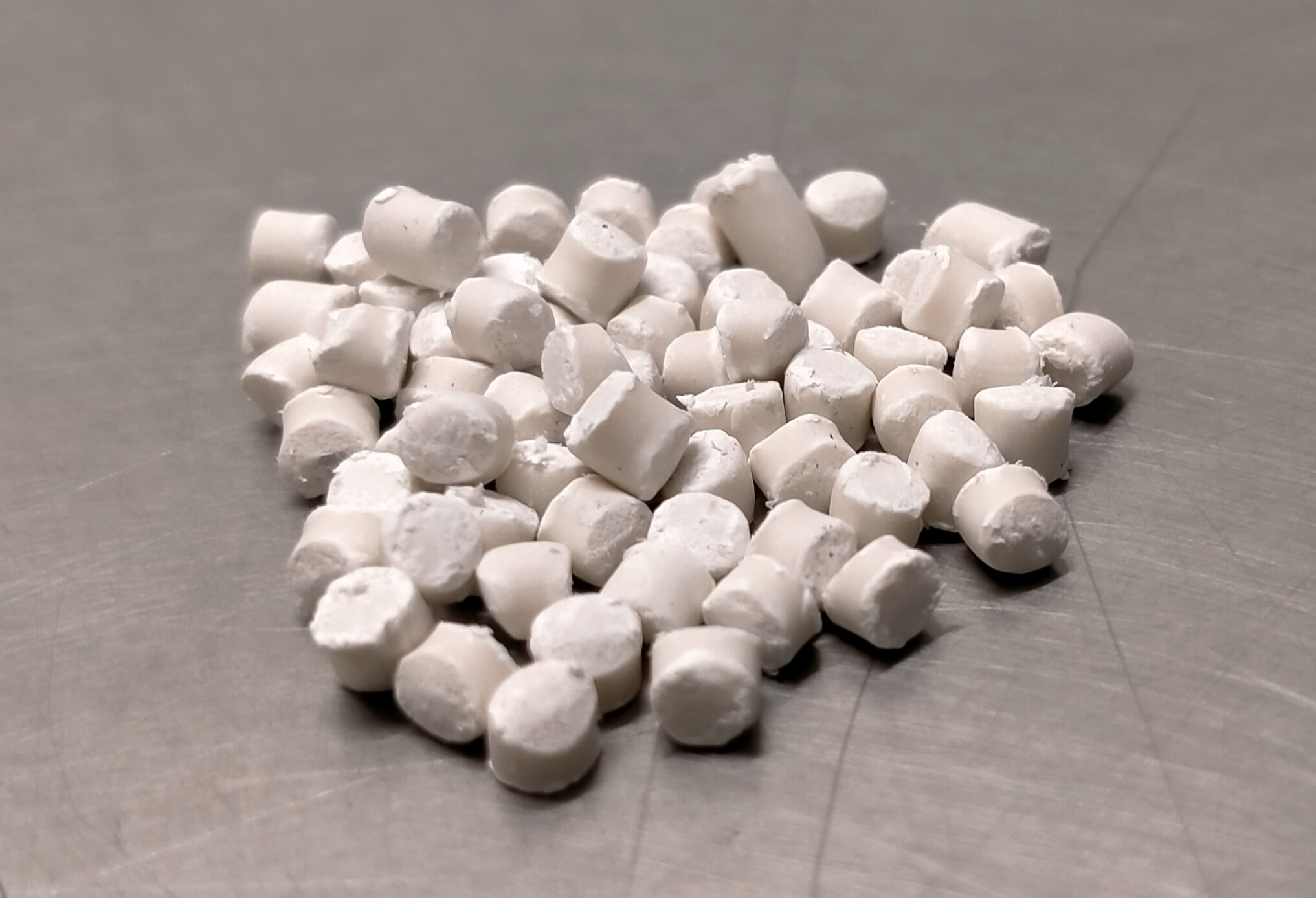
White plastic nurdles

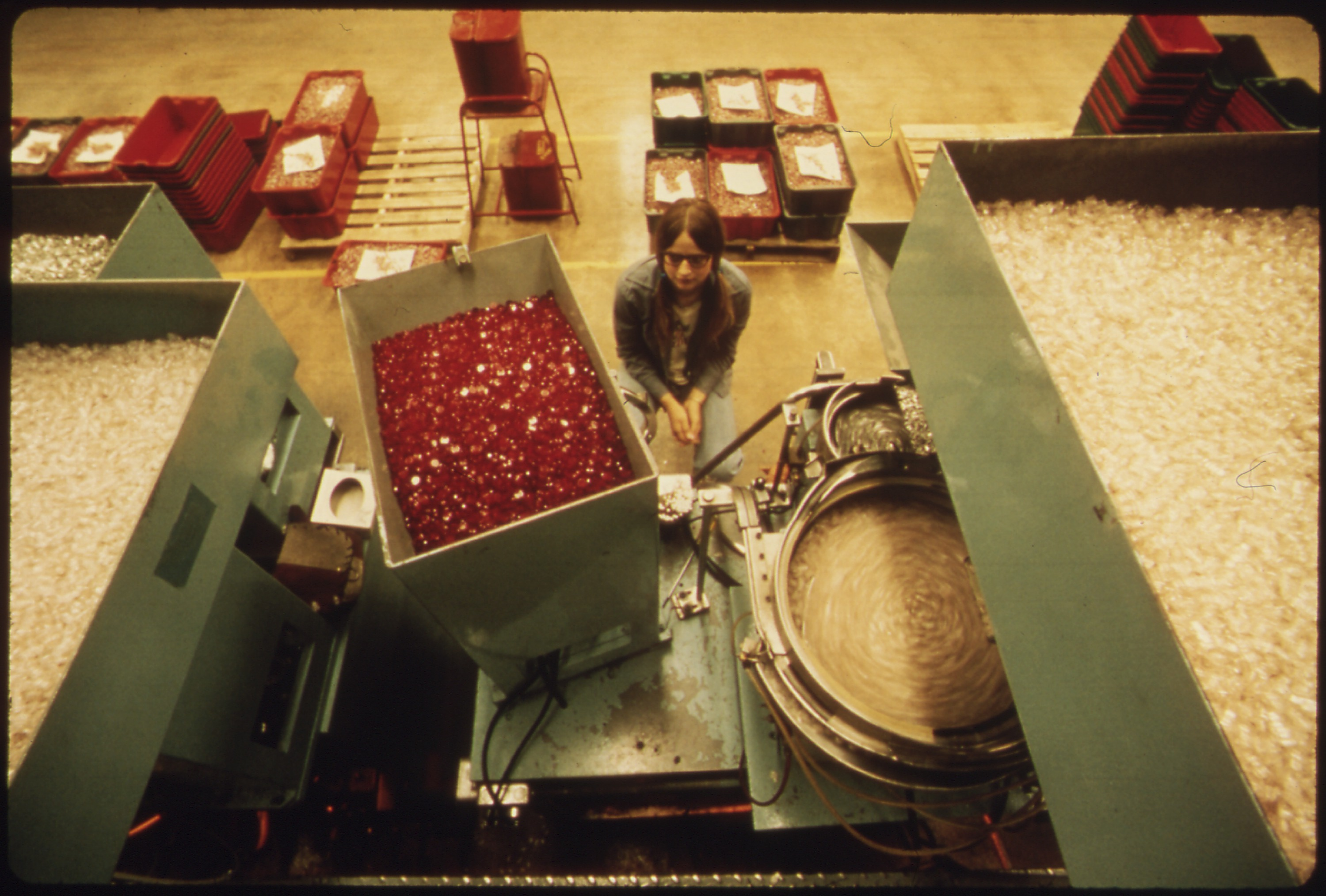
Nurdles in an industrial plant in the US

Pre-production plastic pellets, commonly known as nurdles, are tiny plastic pellets (smaller than 5 mm or 0.20 in) that are universally used in the plastics industry for the manufacture of plastic products. These microplastics are made primarily from polyethylene, polypropylene, polystyrene, polyvinyl chloride, and other plastics or synthetic resins. Nurdles are the building block, via plastic extrusion or injection molding, for items for everyday life including plastic water bottles, containers, and bags.

Nurdles cause environmental damage where they are spilled into rivers and oceans, and eaten by birds and fish who mistake them for eggs. Creatures can be poisoned by toxins adsorbed by the plastic, which can enter the human food chain.

== Impact on the environment ==
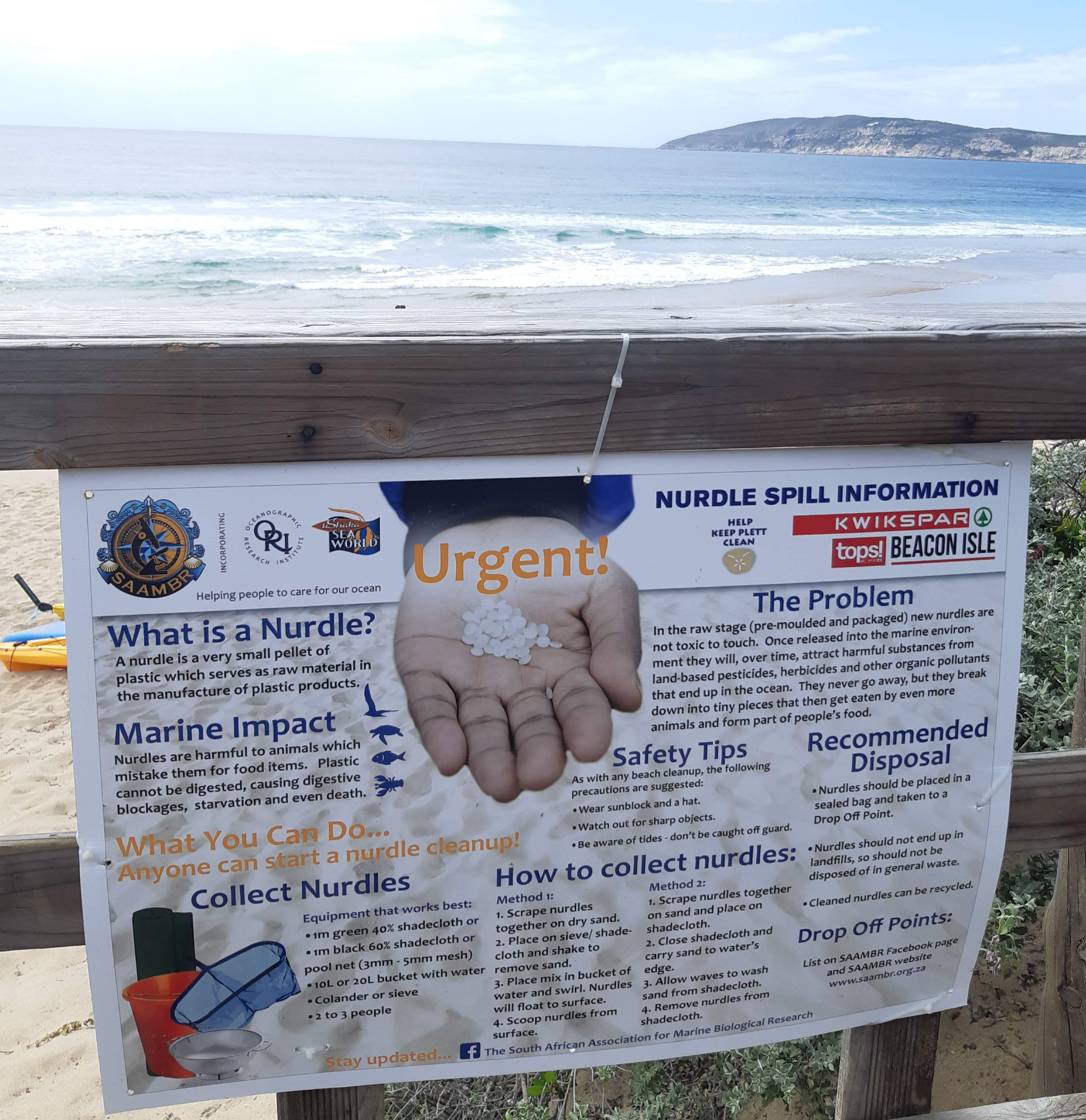
Sign encouraging the collection of coastal nurdles

These plastics can be seen washing up on shorelines of rivers, beaches, and lakes across the world. The earliest date that nurdles were recorded being seen on beaches was around the 1970s but have been recorded as being used earlier around the 1940s and 1950s. The pellets find their way into the ocean in a multitude of ways, including accidental spills in transport, and move quickly as they are small enough to be blown around by wind and also float on water. For example, about 25 tonnes of nurdles escaped after a vessel struck a shipping container on the River Tyne, England on 19 July 2026. Over time the pellets break down to smaller sizes.

=== Ecosystems ===
Nurdles can disrupt many ecosystems, as some birds and fish may confuse these plastic pieces for their food and can end up starving because of how much plastic they have eaten. Nurdles can adsorb toxins and other harmful chemicals, known as persistent organic pollutants (POPs), that can be eaten by fish, which can poison them or get caught for human consumption. Biofilms can also form on nurdles that hold pathogens harmful to people.

=== Citizen Science and the Environmental Microplastics Collection ===
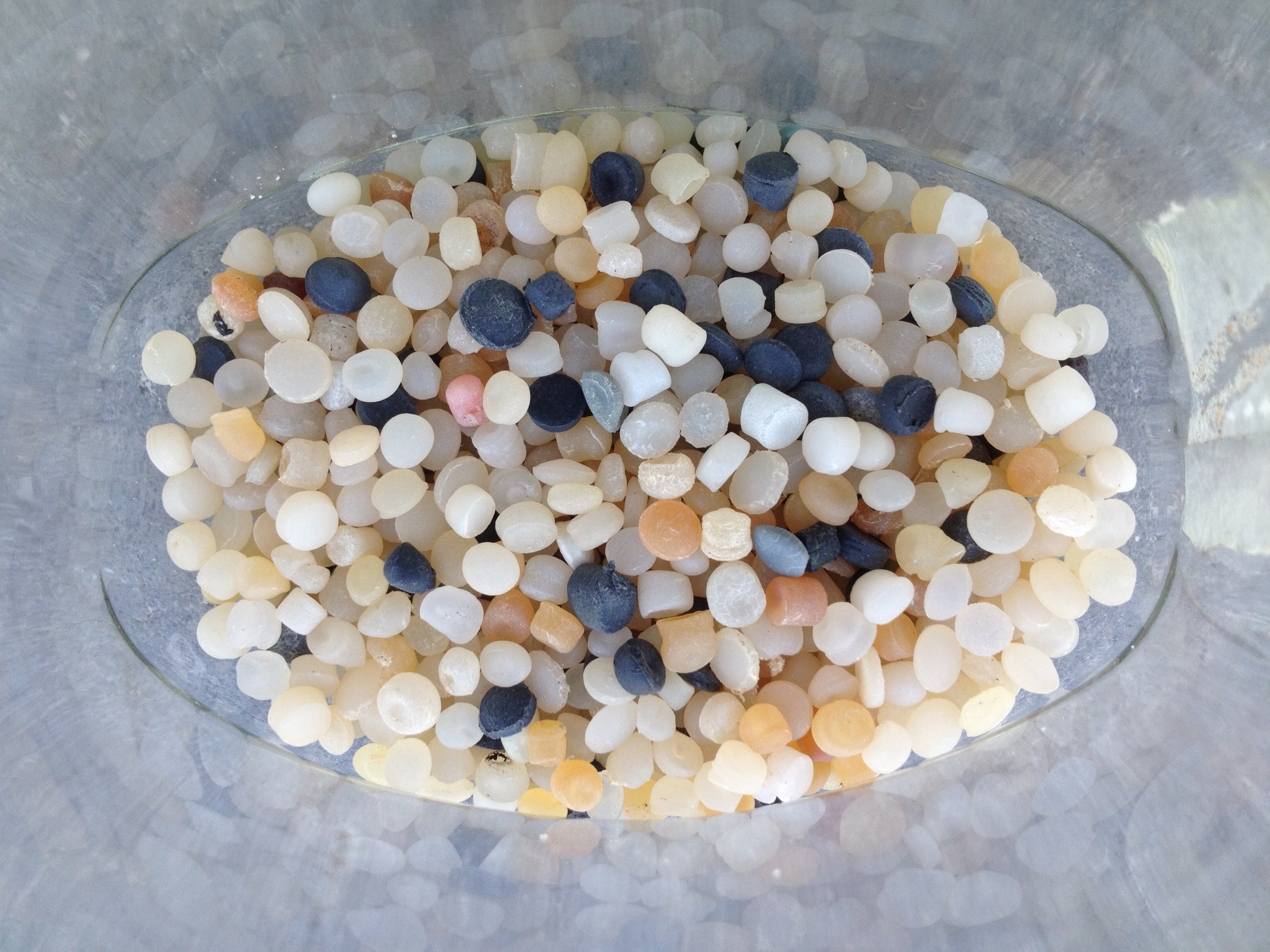
Top view of a jar filled with nurdles picked from a beach

Nurdles that wash up along waterbodies and along railroad tracks are monitored using citizen science programs. In the United States, community members can monitor nurdles using methods outlined at Nurdlepatrol. Once collected, nurdle specimens can be deposited into the Environmental Microplastics Collection. This collection acts like a natural history collection with specimens collected, their location, time and date of collection, and number of nurdles collected are curated for future research use. Nurdles are traceable, to an extent, to their origin as companies that produce nurdles each have their own "fingerprint" of polymerized chemicals.

== See also ==
- Pelletizing
