= Feed mixer =

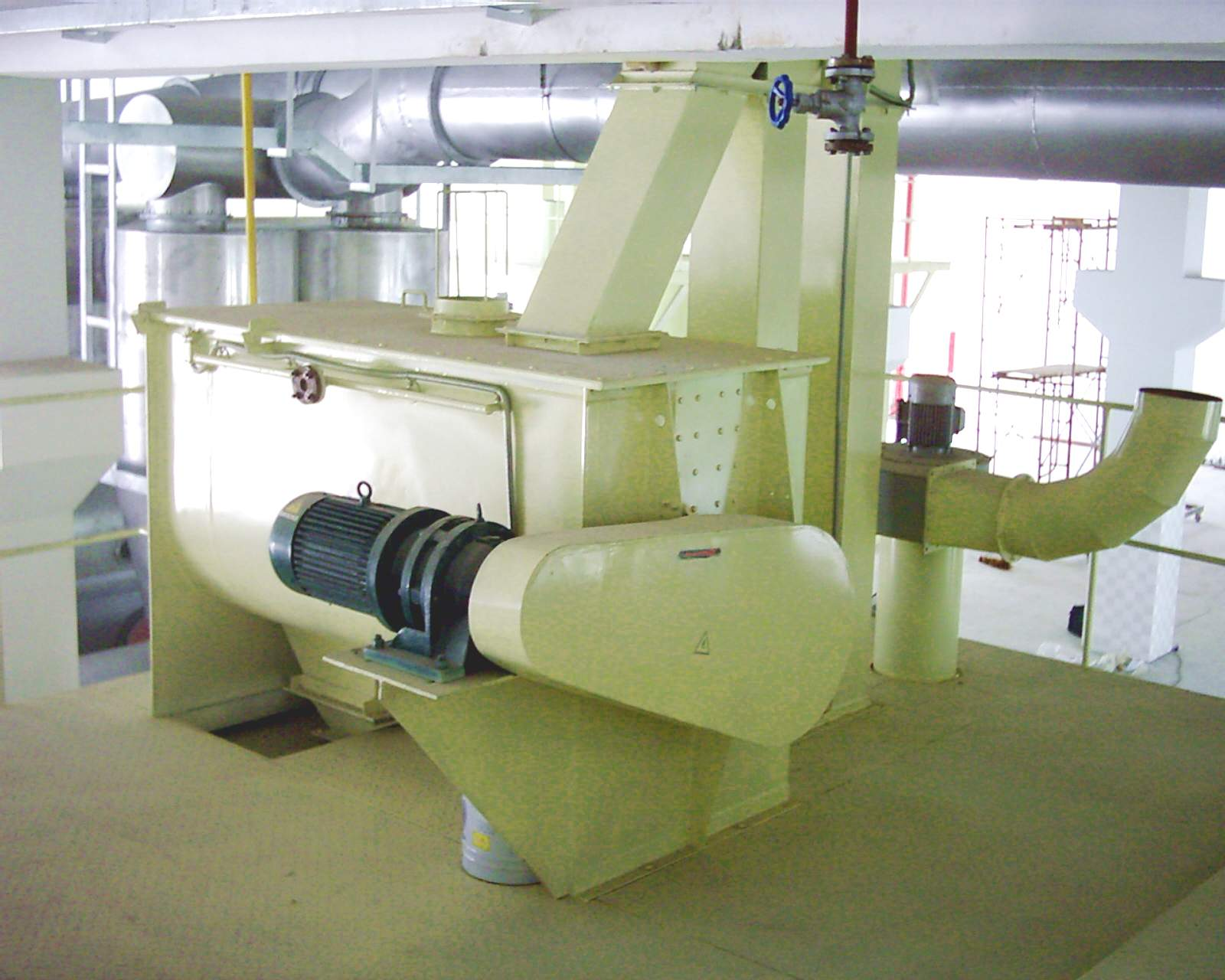
Horizontal Ribbon Mixer

Feed mixers are used in feed mills for the mixing of feed ingredients and premixes. The mixer plays a vital role in the feed production process, with efficient mixing being the key to good feed production. If feed is not mixed properly, ingredients and nutrients will not be properly distributed when it comes time to extrude and pelletize the feed, or if the feed is to be used as mash. This means that not only would the feed not have nutritional benefit, it would be bad for the animals that are eating it.

== Mixer types ==
There are a number of different type of mixers used in the feed industry with the most widely used being:

- Vertical Mixer – Used in small farms, they consist of a vertical screw which takes material to the top where it falls back down again, and repeats that process to mix materials
- Horizontal Mixer – Consisting of paddles (paddle mixer) or blades (ribbon blender) attached to a horizontal rotor, these mixers usually have a higher consistent homogeneity and short mixing times.

These machines come in a variety of configurations:

- Round bowl- The sides are shaped in rounding configuration
- Decagon bowl- The sides are shaped with angled flats creating a circular configuration
- Square bowl- The sides are similar to a square box with the top being open to load feed.
- Paddle reel- A large rotating reel with paddles to move feed forward and back.
- Auger system- Multiple augers processing feed and moving forward and backwards in the tub.
- Vertical screw- A vertical standing auger moving feed upward and down the sides to process feed.

== See also ==
- Mixer-wagon
- Sigma Mixers
