= Sugar beet harvester =

Harvesting machine

A sugar beet harvester is an agricultural machine for harvesting sugar beet. It was invented by German farmer and agricultural engineer Otto Wilke in 1927. From 1936, series production then started first at Krupp, then later at Lanz (today John Deere). From 1945 the Stoll Company took over beet harvester production after purchasing the patent rights. The first machines were pulled by a tractor and only one row could be lifted. Modern self-propelled sugarbeet harvesters have predominantly 6-row harvesting units. The beets are lifted from the ground by lifting shares. Through cleaning rollers, the transfer web and the discharge elevator, the beets are separated from the adhering soil and transported into the holding tank of the machine. The beets are placed on the edge of the field in storage clamps or overloaded on a transport vehicle during harvesting. The leaves of the beets are removed. They remain for fertilization in the field or can be used as animal food for cattle, the leaves can be fed fresh or as silage.

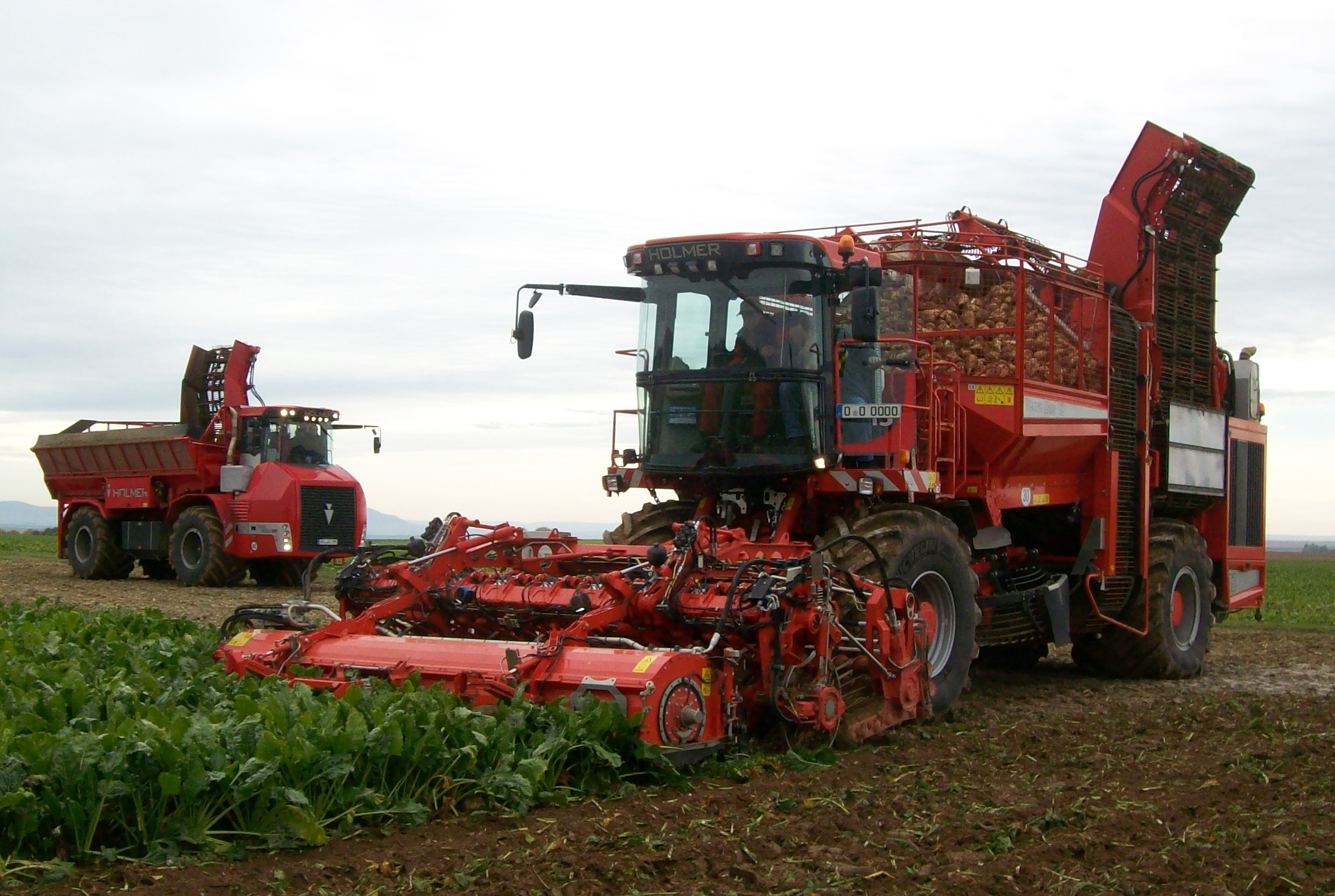
6-row sugar beet harvesting machine (Terra Dos T3) with 2 axles and articulated steering
