= Grinder-mixer =

Agricultural machine

A grinder-mixer is a type of agricultural machine used to process livestock feed from grain. It is a portable mill that combines the mixing and grinding operations.

Grinding of ingredients generally improves feed digestibility, acceptability, mixing properties and pelletability.

Grain is typically pulverized in a grinder-mixer either by hammer mills or roller mills.

Hammermills are impact grinders with swinging or stationary steel bars forcing ingredients against a circular screen or solid serrated section designated as a striking plate. Material is held in the grinding chamber until it is reduced to the size of the openings in the screen. The number of hammers on a rotating shaft, their size, arrangement, sharpness, the speed of rotation, wear patterns, and clearance at the tip relative to the screen or striking plate are important variables in grinding capacity and the appearance of ground feed.

A combination of cutting, attrition, and crushing occurs in roller mills. These are smooth or corrugated rolls rotating at the same speed set at a pre-determined distance apart with material passing between the two. A tearing action may be added by operating the rolls at different speeds and by different for each roll.

The objective of feed mixing is to start with a certain assortment of ingredients called a "formula", totaling some definite weight. This is processed so that each small unit of the whole, either a mouthful or a day's feeding, is the same proportion as the original formula. The mixing process is done in the vertical tank. It determines the balanced nutritional quality of the feed.

After the feed is ground and mixed, it passes through a system of particulate screens. From there, only suitable granules pass on to the delivery process, and waste is sent to the charging chute.

== See also ==
- Mixer (appliance)
