= Mixer-wagon =

Agricultural machine

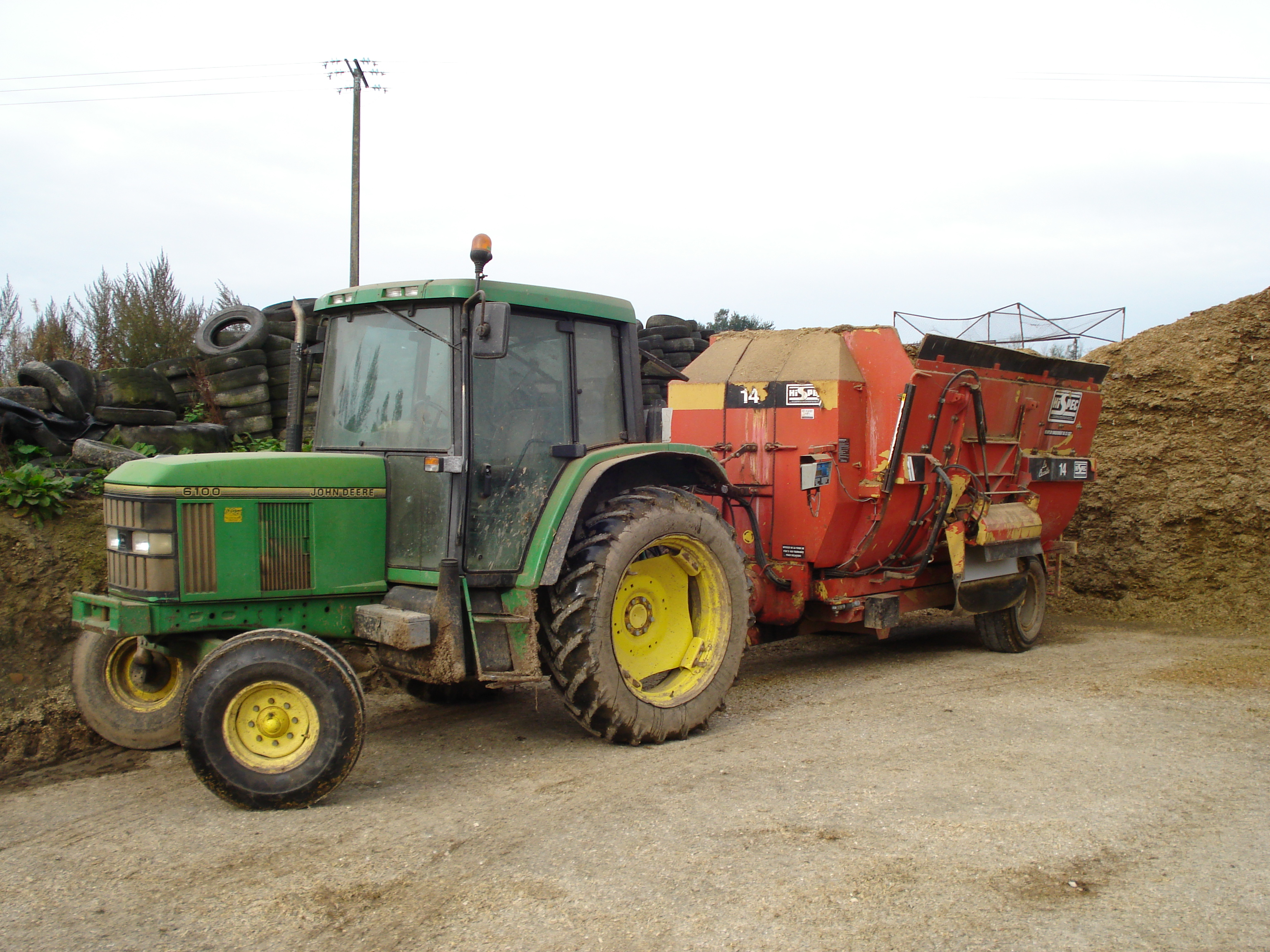
A paddle-type mixer-wagon coupled to a tractor

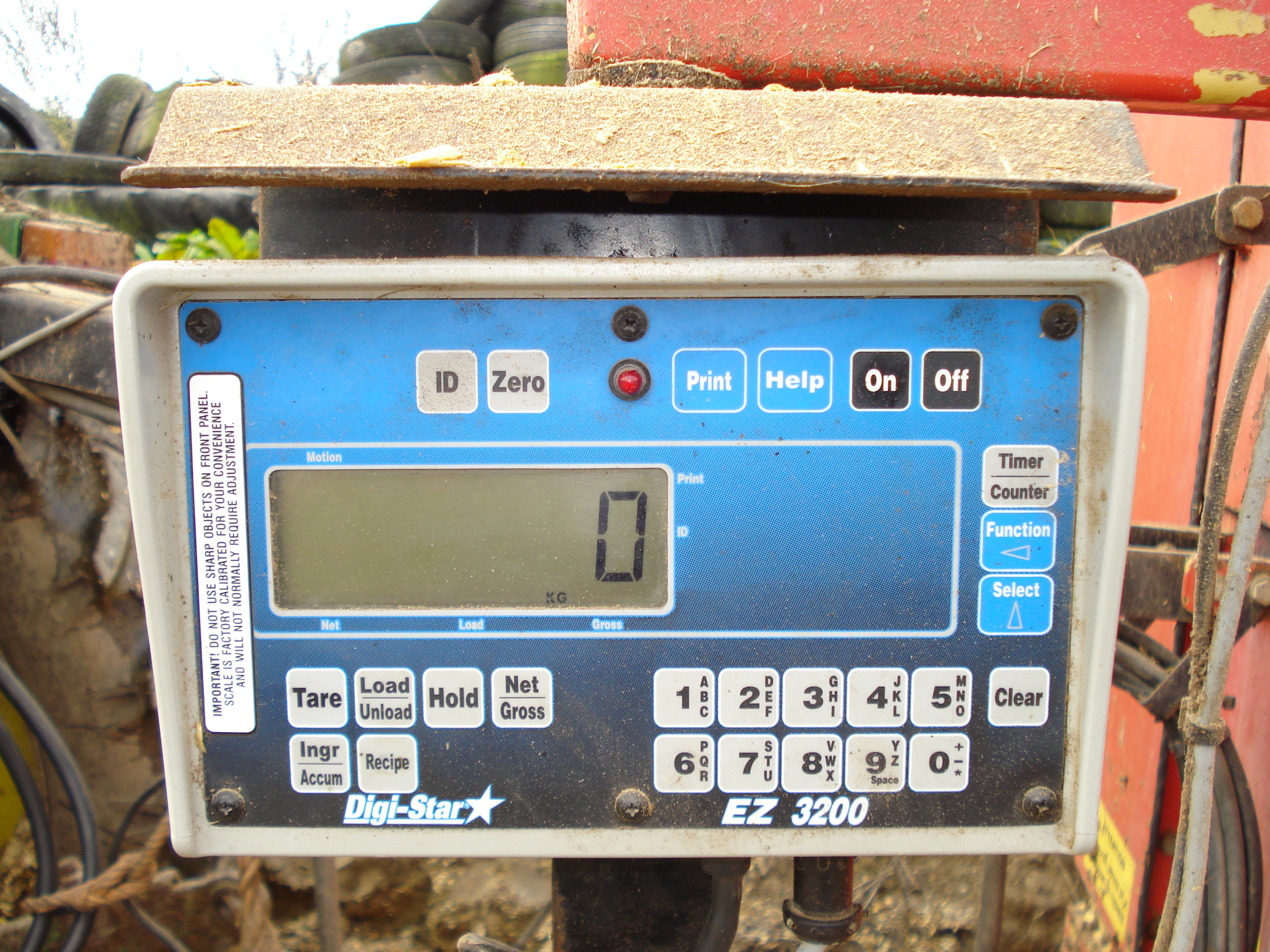
A weighing computer showing an empty mixer-wagon, 0 kg tare

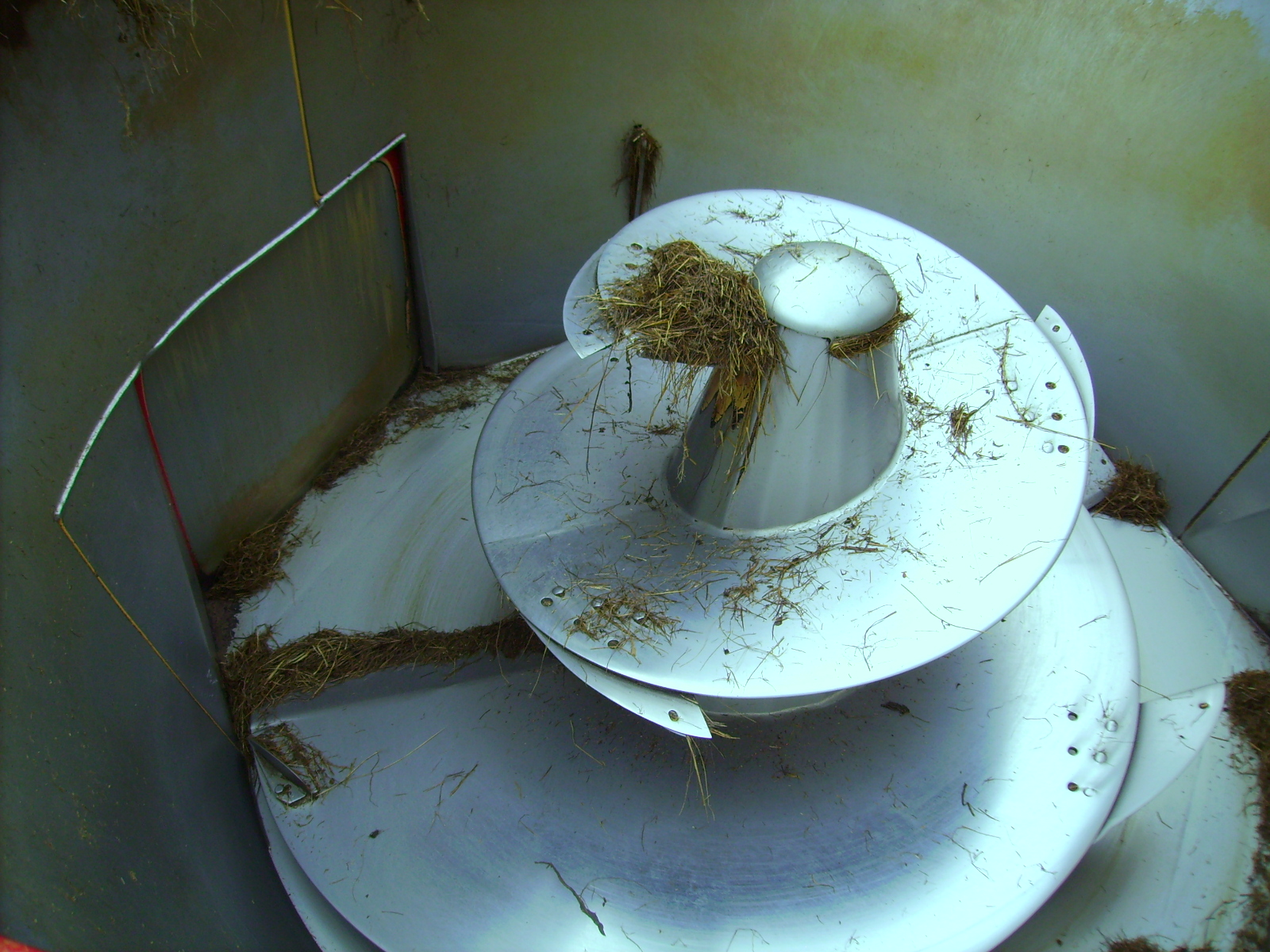

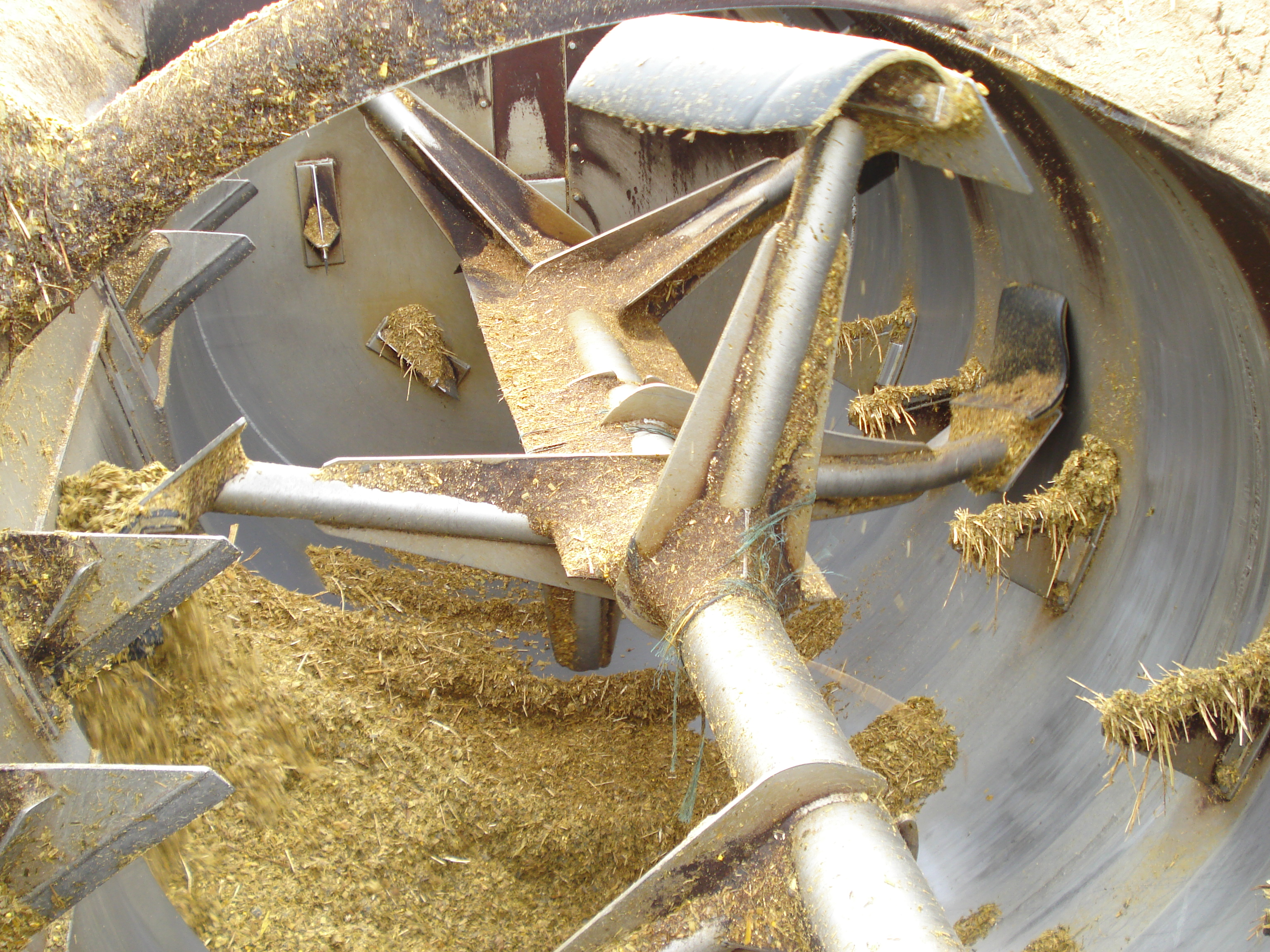
The paddle turning inside a mixer-wagon. Stationary knives are fitted on the side of the tub

A mixer-wagon, or diet feeder, is a specialist agricultural machine used for accurately weighing, mixing and distributing total mixed ration (TMR) for ruminant farm animals, in particular cattle and most commonly, dairy cattle.

Trailed mixer-wagons vary in size from 5 m^{3} to more than 45 m^{3}. Some self-propelled mixer-wagons may be bigger than this. Displacement varies according to ration dry matter. More water means more weight. With dry (45% DM; dry matter) rations, a 14m^{3} mixer-wagon such as the one pictured, may contain 3 tonnes fully loaded, or enough for about 60 Holstein cows.

A mixer-wagon commonly consists of:

- a trailed chassis, for coupling to a tractor power unit, and fitted with one or more usually braked axles, and fitted with a road-legal lighting system.
- a mixing body, attached to the chassis by four weighing sensors, one at each corner. There are three main types of mixing body:

- paddle, whereby a central axial shaft turns a series of paddles which rotate the contents and provide front to back mixing in the mixer-wagon.
- vertical auger, with one, two or three augers used to move the contents from top to bottom.
- horizontal auger, containing between one and five augers, used to circulate the contents from front to back and bottom to top.

- a digital weighing computer working through the above-mentioned weighing sensors. Such a computer can typically memorise 9 or more different rations and 99 or more ingredients.

The system can weigh in all the ingredients of a ration in any chosen order and weigh out according to chosen quantities corresponding to the needs of different groups of animals. As each ingredient is loaded, a visual and audible signal alerts the operator when the required amount is reached. The flashing light and "beep" system repeats faster and faster until the ingredient is complete, when the signal becomes continuous for 2 seconds. The computer then shifts to the next ingredient and displays the product name and weight to be loaded. Loading is generally done using the mixer-wagon cutting and loading device, a high capacity tractor loader, or a telescopic handler.

- the mixing paddle, rotors or augers are connected to the tractor Power Take-Off (PTO) through a reducer system, provided by either a planetary gearbox, and / or a step-down pulley and chain system.
- a set of stationary knives, against which long fibre may be chopped by the forcing action of the mixing rotor.
- a hydraulic door to seal the ration in during mixing, thus permitting the use of liquid feeds such as molasses.
- an unloading system, consisting of a simple hydraulically adjustable chute, up to a hydraulic powered conveyor belt.
- Self-propelled mixer-wagons are mounted on a lorry chassis or may be specialist self-loading machines.

== See also ==
- Feed mixer
