= FAW Toyota =

Automobile manufacturing company

FAW Toyota Motor Co., Ltd.
- Native name: 一汽丰田汽车有限公司
- Type: Joint venture
- Industry: Automotive
- Founded: June 2000; 26 years ago
- Headquarters: Tianjin, China
- Key people: Hiroyuki Fujiwara (General Manager)
- Owner: FAW Group (50%); Toyota Motor Corporation (45%); Toyota Motor China (5%)
- Divisions: Ranz
- Subsidiaries: FAW Toyota Research & Development Co., Ltd. Tianjin Toyota Pressing Parts Co., Ltd. Tianjin Toyota Colophony Parts Co., Ltd.
- Website: www.ftms.com.cn

FAW Toyota Motor Co., Ltd. (FTMC) (simplified Chinese: 一汽丰田汽车有限公司; traditional Chinese: 一汽豐田汽車有限公司; pinyin: Yīqì fēngtián qìchē yǒuxiàn gōngsī), previously named Tianjin FAW Toyota Motor Co., Ltd. (TFTM) (Chinese: 天津一汽丰田汽车有限公司), is an automobile manufacturing company based in Xiqing District, Tianjin, China. It is a manufacturing and supervising affiliate of the joint venture between FAW Group and Toyota Motor Company, and commonly known as FAW Toyota (simplified Chinese: 一汽丰田; traditional Chinese: 一汽豐田; pinyin: Yīqì fēngtián).

Created in 2003, it is an equally owned joint venture with Toyota. As of 2007, it has one passenger vehicle production base in the Xiqing District of Tianjin and two in the Tianjin Economic and Technological Development Zone. As of 2008, it continues to control three production bases and manufactures several Toyota products including the Corolla and Vios. As of 2008, it had an annual production capacity of 470,000. It had a subsidiary brand called Ranz, but it did not perform as well as other joint venture brands that were mushrooming in the 2010s. In 2022, the company was renamed from Tianjin FAW Toyota to FAW Toyota.

== Subsidiaries ==
Type	Current name			Previous name (before 2022)		
Type	English	abbr.	Chinese	English	abbr.	Chinese
Body Manufacturing	FAW Toyota Motor Co., Ltd.	FTMC	一汽丰田汽车有限公司	Tianjin FAW Toyota Motor Co., Ltd.	TFTM	天津一汽丰田汽车有限公司
Body Manufacturing	FAW Toyota Motor (Chengdu) Co., Ltd.	FTCC	一汽丰田汽车（成都）有限公司	Sichuan FAW Toyota Motor Co., Ltd.	SFTM/SFTM Chengdu	四川一汽丰田汽车有限公司
Body Manufacturing	FAW Toyota Motor (Chengdu) Co., Ltd. Changchun Fengyue Branch (FTCF)	FTCF	一汽丰田汽车（成都）有限公司长春丰越分公司	Sichuan FAW Toyota Motor Changchun Fengyue Co., Ltd.	SFTMCF/SFTM Changchun	四川一汽丰田汽车有限公司长春丰越公司
Engine Manufacturing	FAW Toyota Engine (Tianjin) Co., Ltd.	FTET	一汽丰田发动机（天津）有限公司	Tianjin FAW Toyota Engine Co., Ltd.	TFTE	天津一汽丰田发动机有限公司
Engine Manufacturing	FAW Toyota Engine (Changchun) Co., Ltd.	FTEC	一汽丰田发动机（长春）有限公司	FAW Toyota (Changchun) Engine Co., Ltd.	FTCE	一汽丰田（长春）发动机有限公司
Sales	FAW Toyota Motor Sales Co., Ltd.	FTMS	一汽丰田汽车销售有限公司	(not changed)		
Research and Development	FAW Toyota Motor Co., Ltd Research & Development Branch	FTRD	一汽丰田汽车有限公司技术研发分公司	Tianjin FAW Toyota Research & Development Co., Ltd	FTRD	天津一汽丰田汽车有限公司技术研发分公司
Research and Development	FAW Toyota Motor Co., Ltd New Energy Branch	FTEV	一汽丰田汽车有限公司新能源分公司	Tianjin FAW Toyota New Energy Co., Ltd	FTEV	天津一汽丰田汽车有限公司新能源分公司

== Products ==
=== Current models ===
==== TFTM (Tianjin Plant) ====
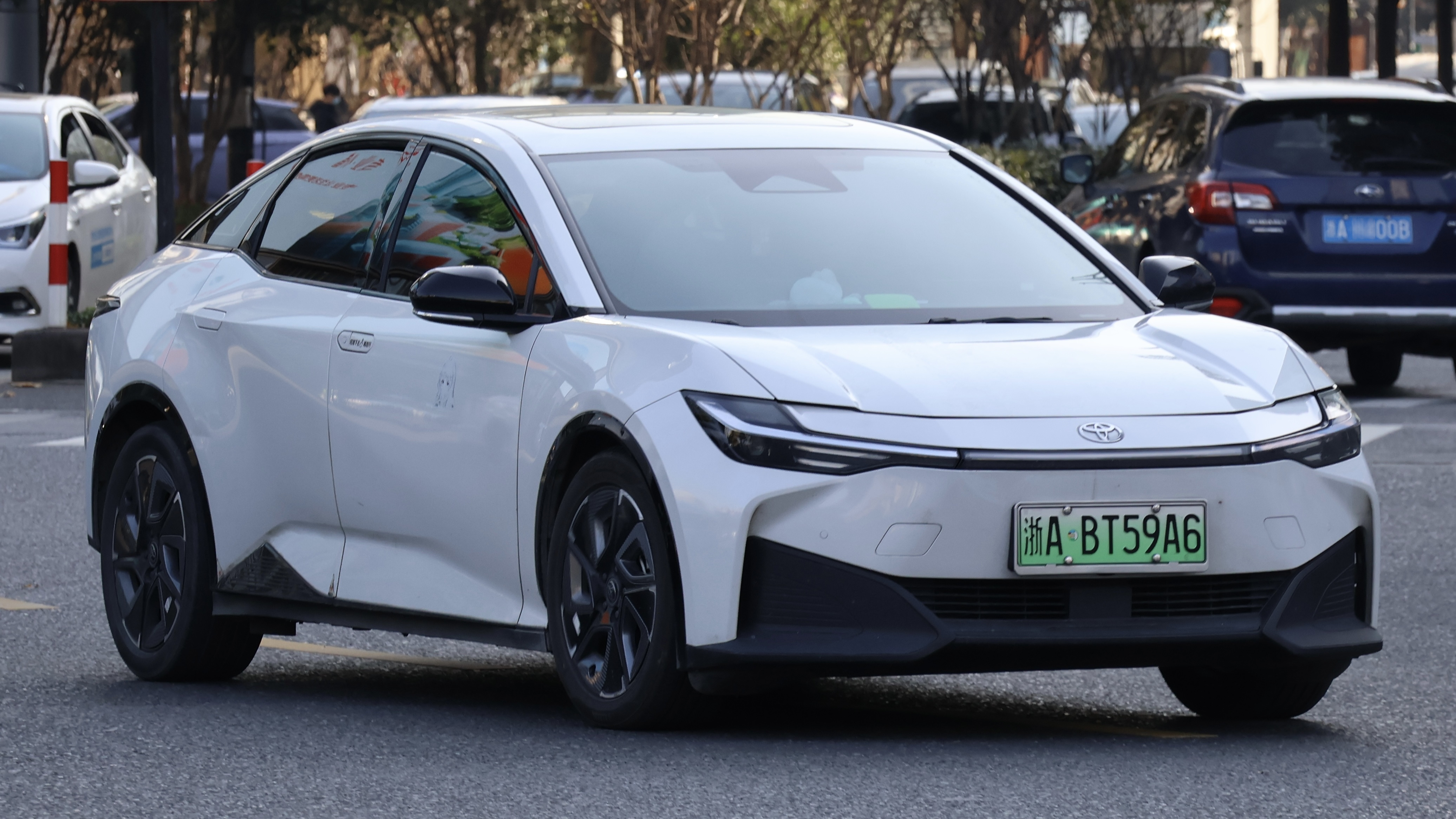
2023–present
丰田bZ3 EA10
Toyota bZ3 EA10

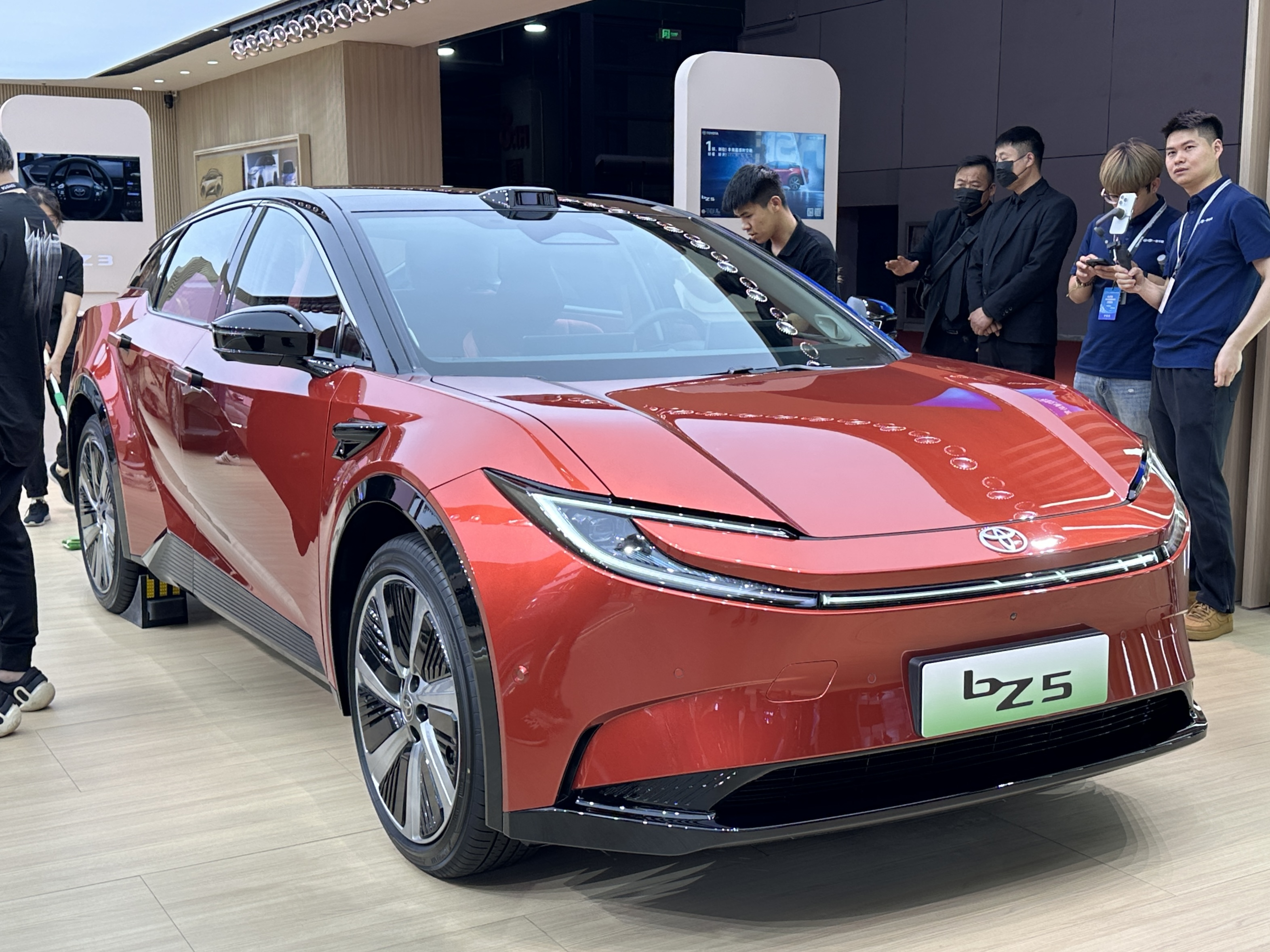
2025–present
丰田bZ5 EA11
Toyota bZ5 EA11

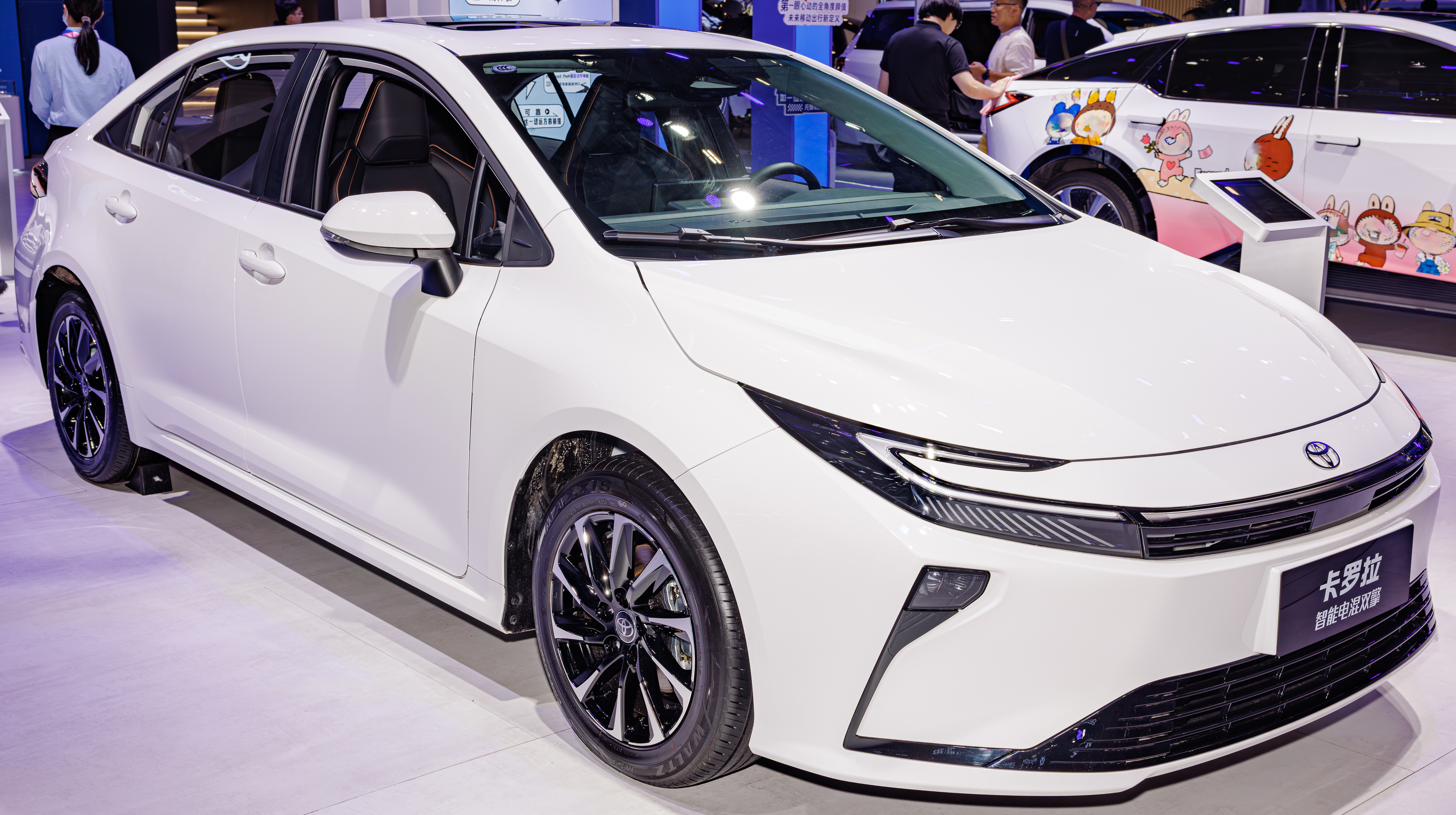
2025–present
丰田卡罗拉E210
Toyota Corolla E210

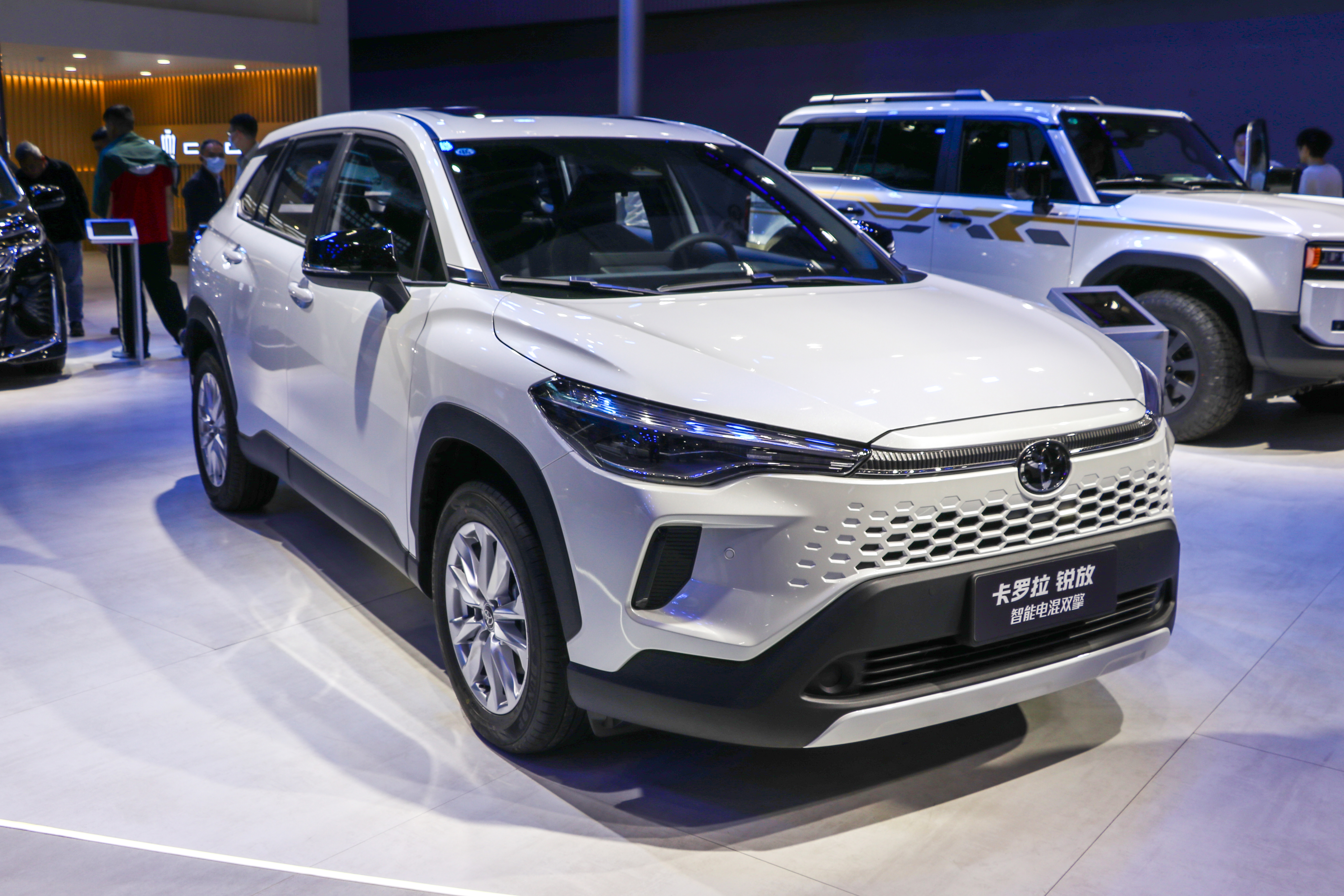
2025–present
丰田卡罗拉锐放XG10
Toyota Corolla Cross XG10

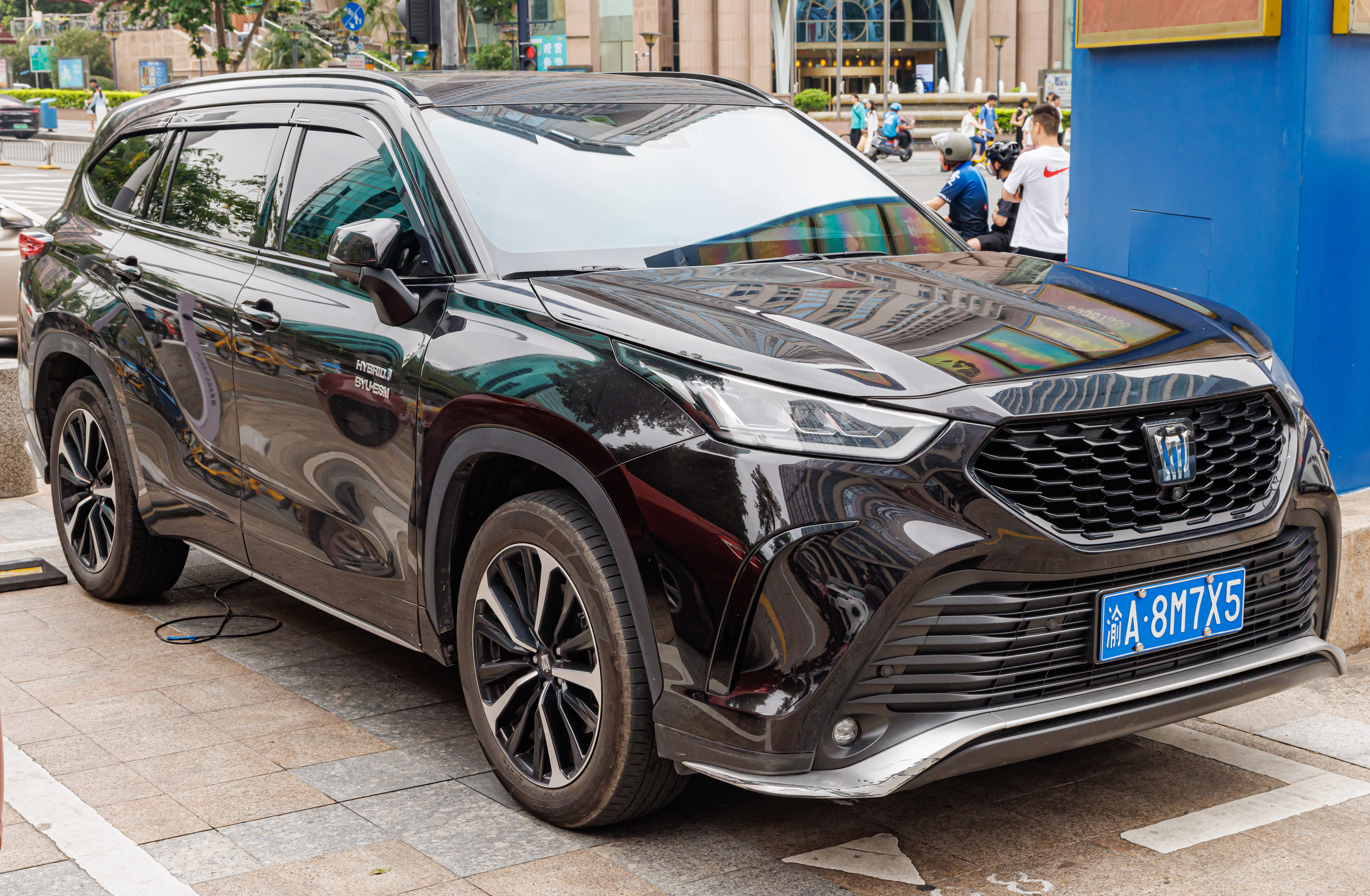
2021–present
丰田皇冠陆放XU70
Toyota Crown Kluger XU70

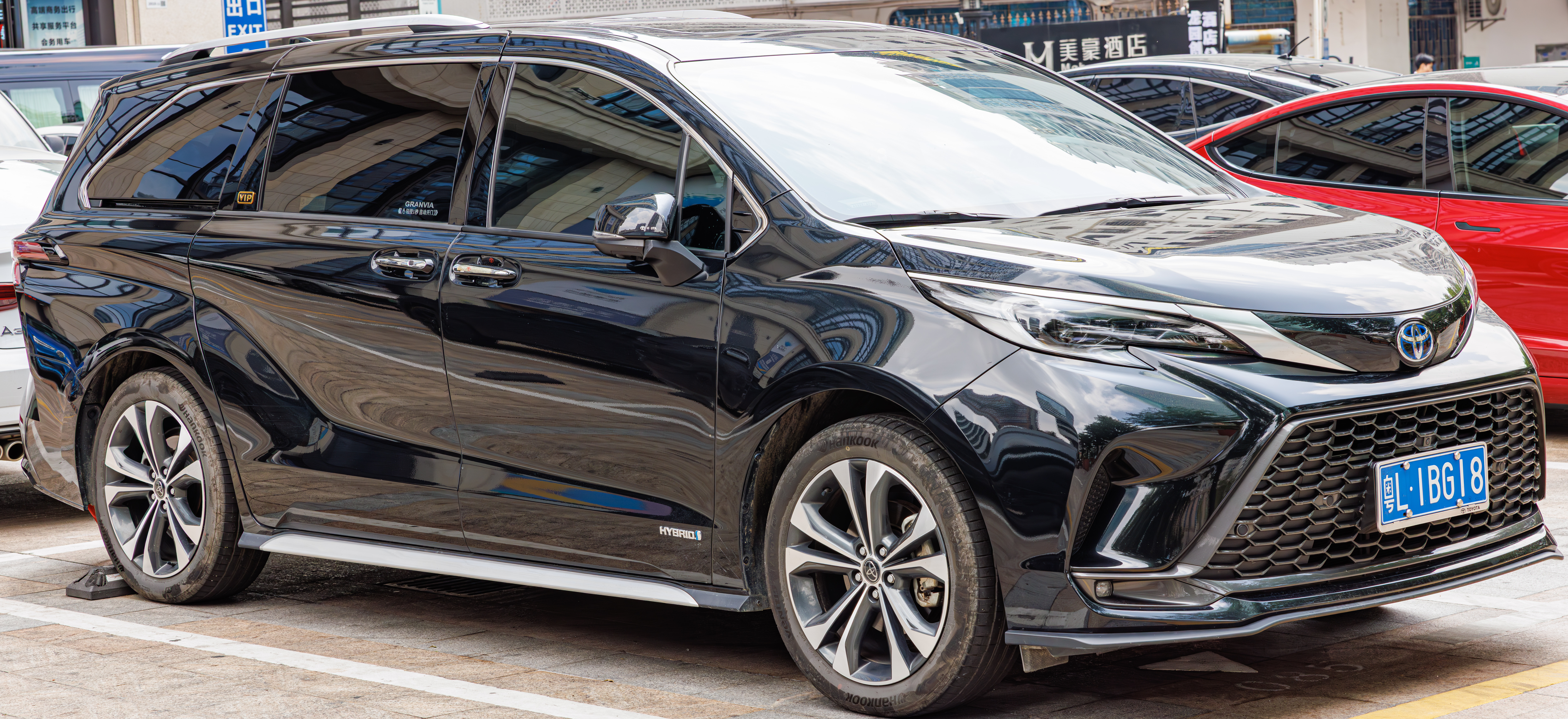
2022–present
丰田格瑞维亚XL40
Toyota Granvia XL40

==== SFTM Chengdu ====
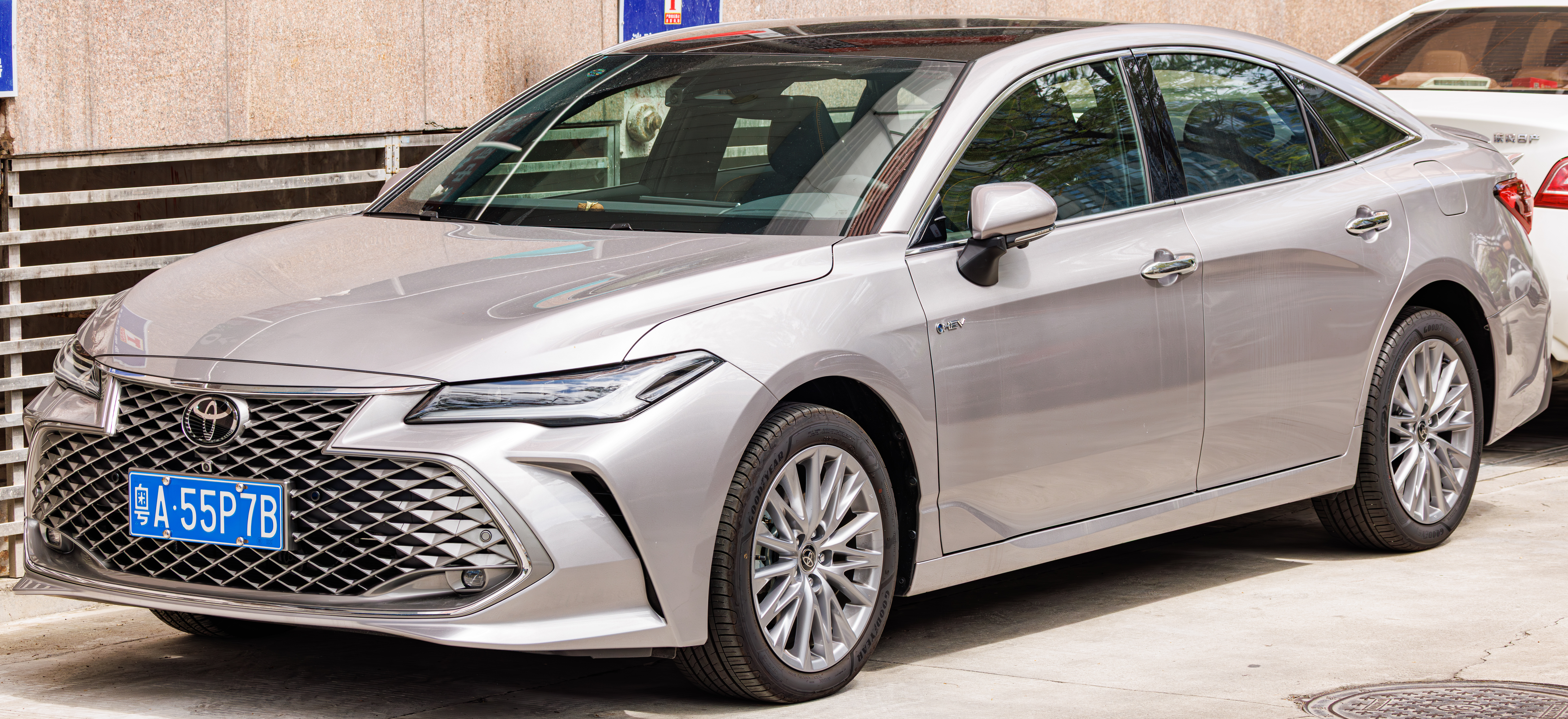
2021–present
丰田亚洲龙XX50
Toyota Avalon XX50

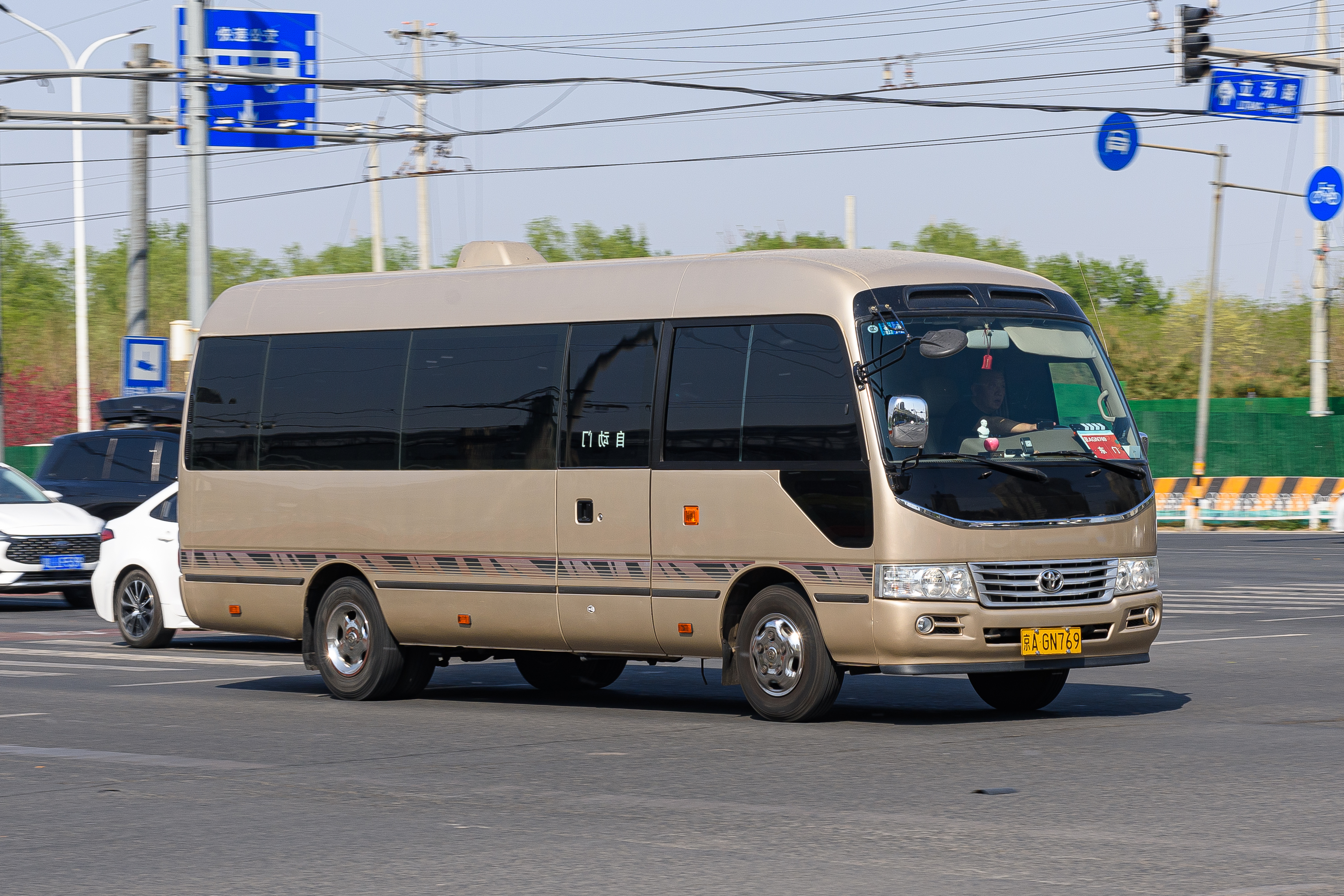
2007–present
丰田柯斯达B50
Toyota Coaster B50

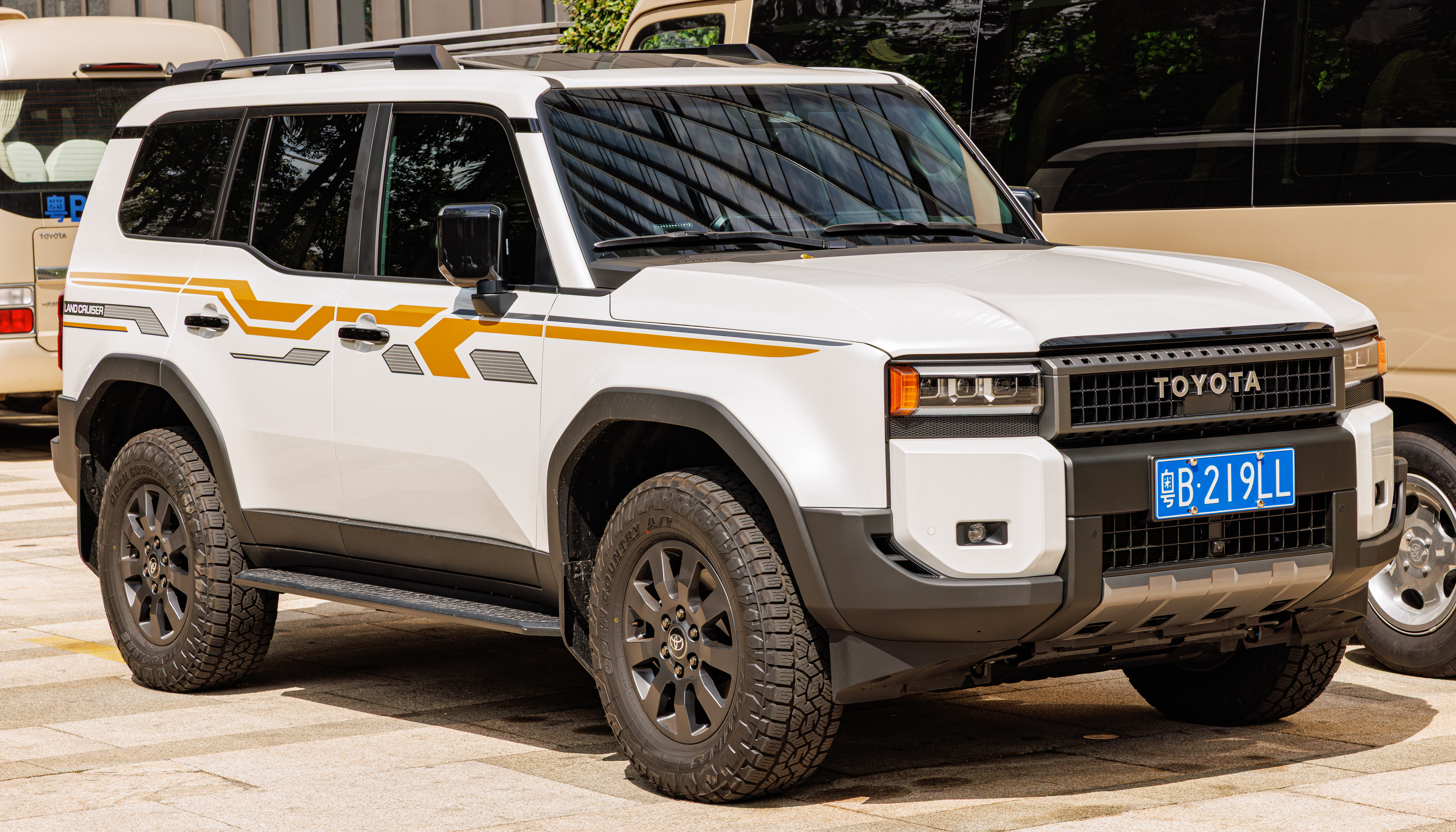
2024–present
丰田普拉多J250
Toyota Land Cruiser Prado J250

==== SFTM Changchun ====
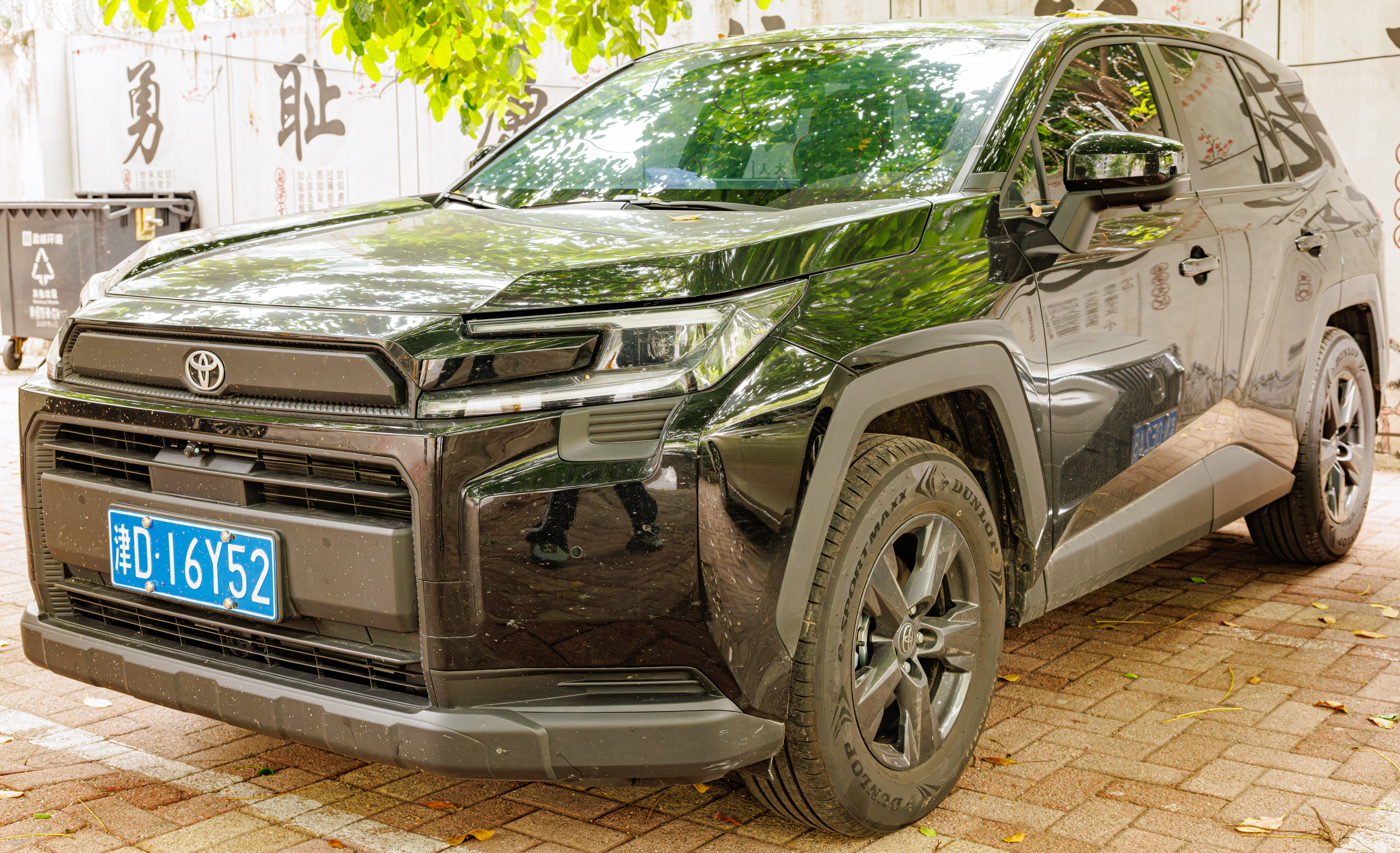
2025–present
丰田RAV4荣放XA60
Toyota RAV4 XA60

=== Current imported models ===
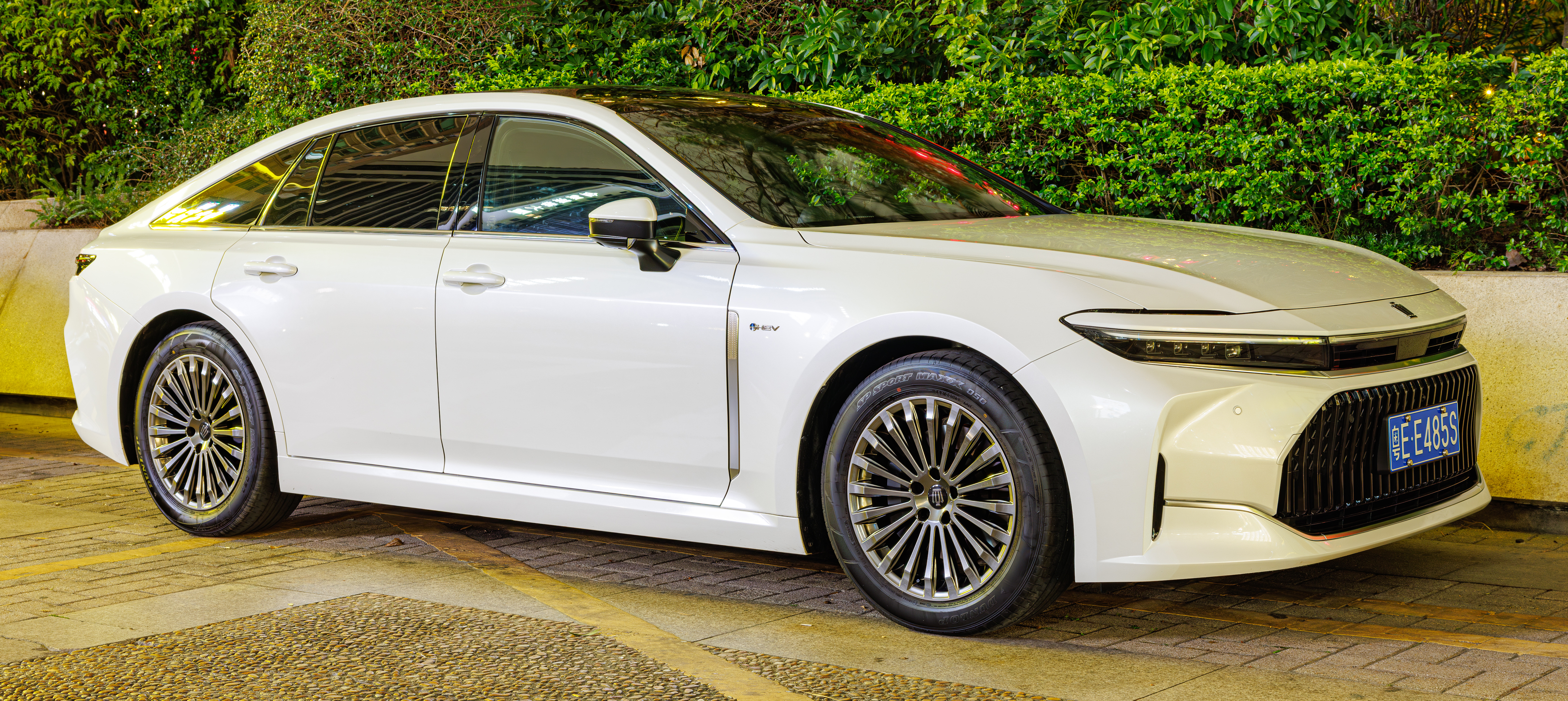
2023–present
丰田皇冠S230
Toyota Crown S230

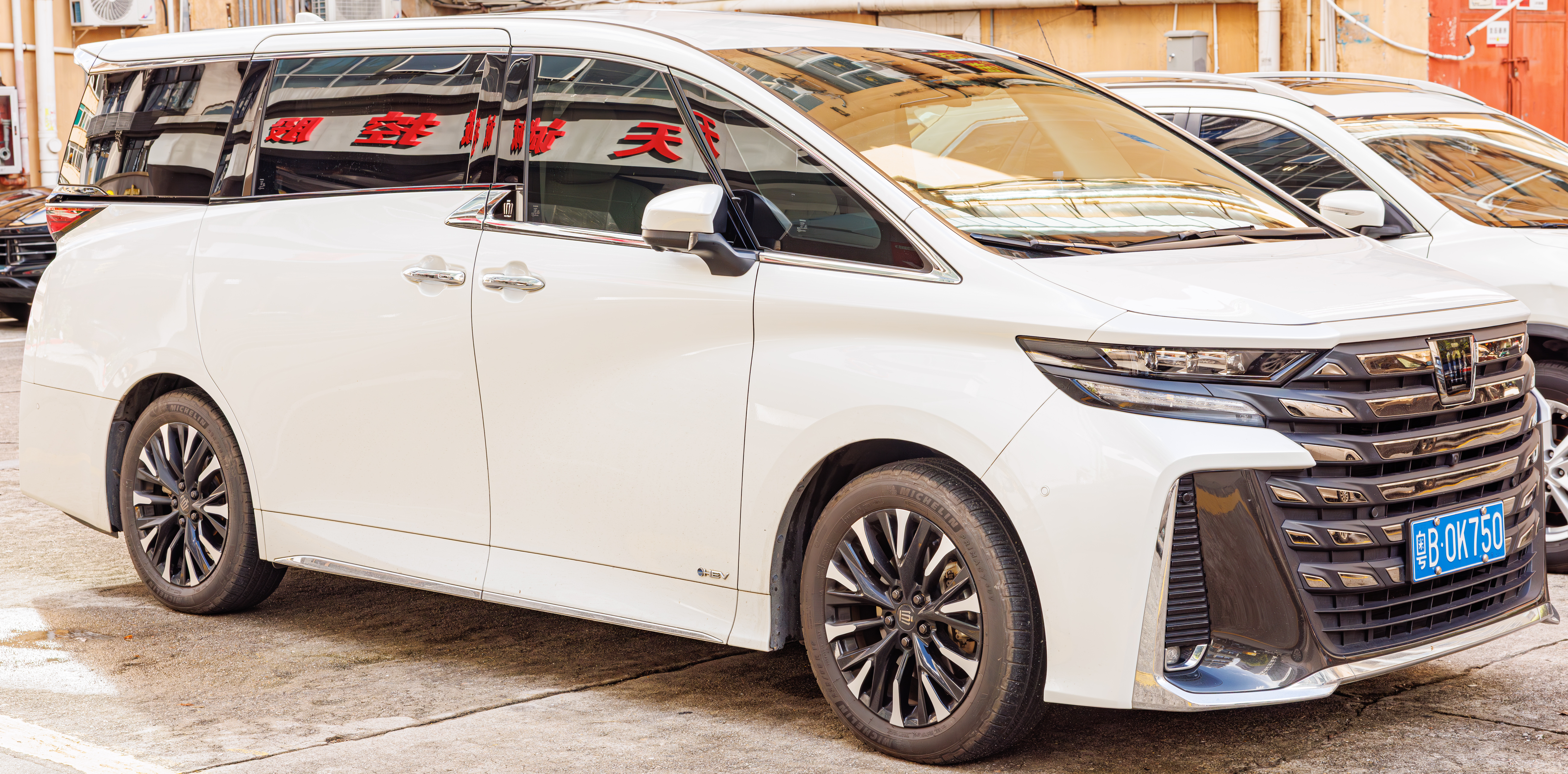
2023–present
丰田皇冠威尔法AH40
Toyota Crown Vellfire AH40

=== Former models ===
==== TFTM (Tianjin Plant) ====
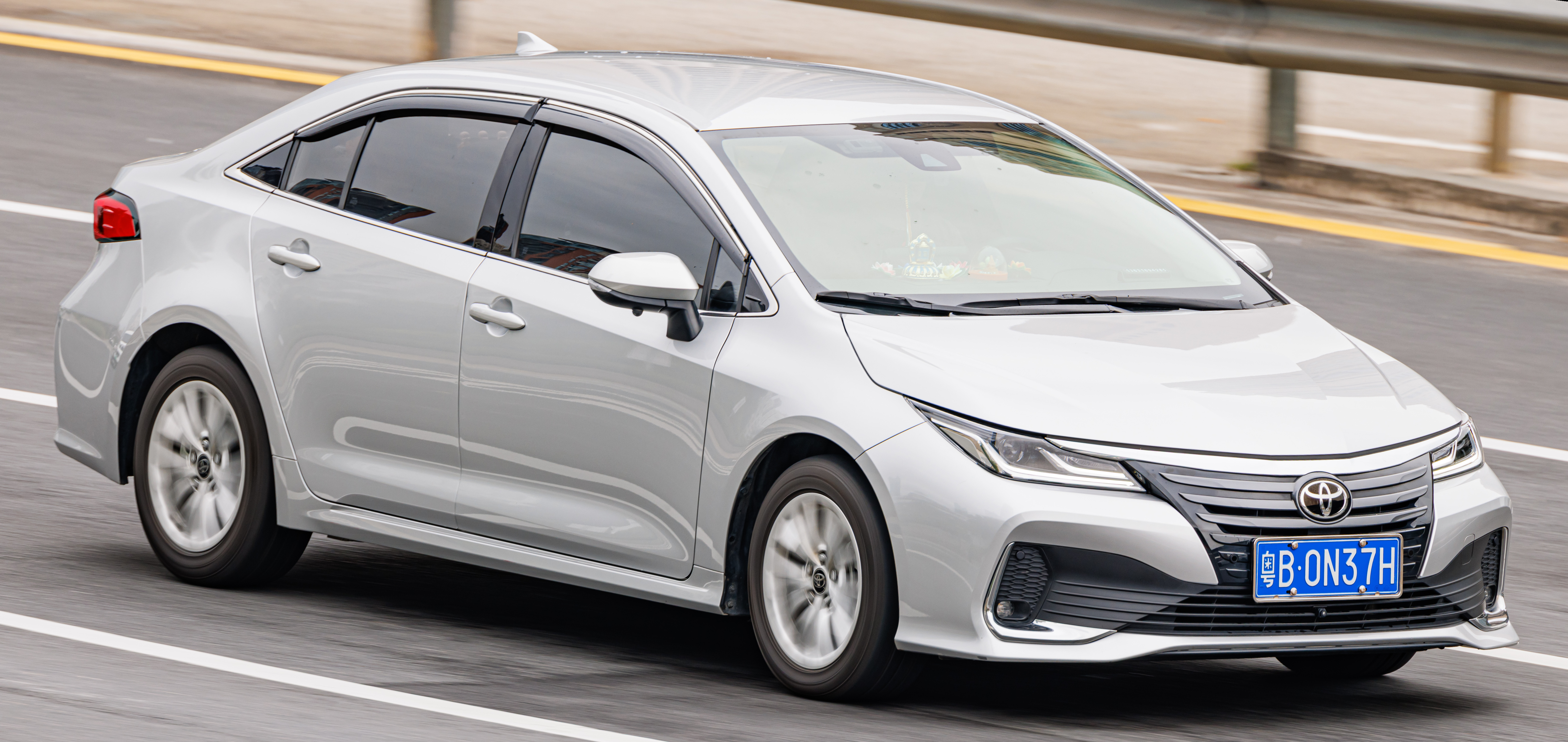
2020–2025
丰田亚洲狮E210
Toyota Allion E210

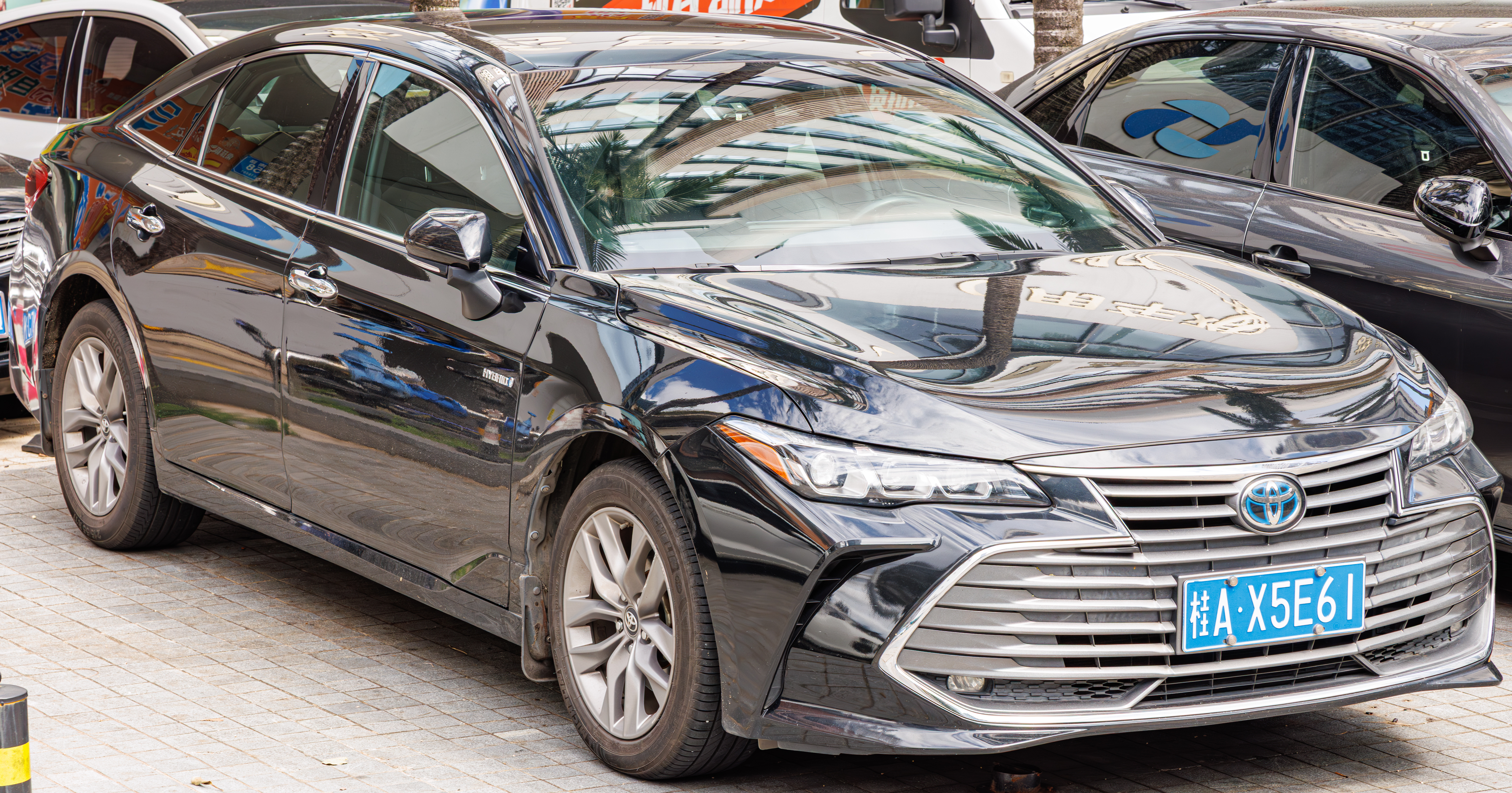
2019–2022
丰田亚洲龙XX50
Toyota Avalon XX50

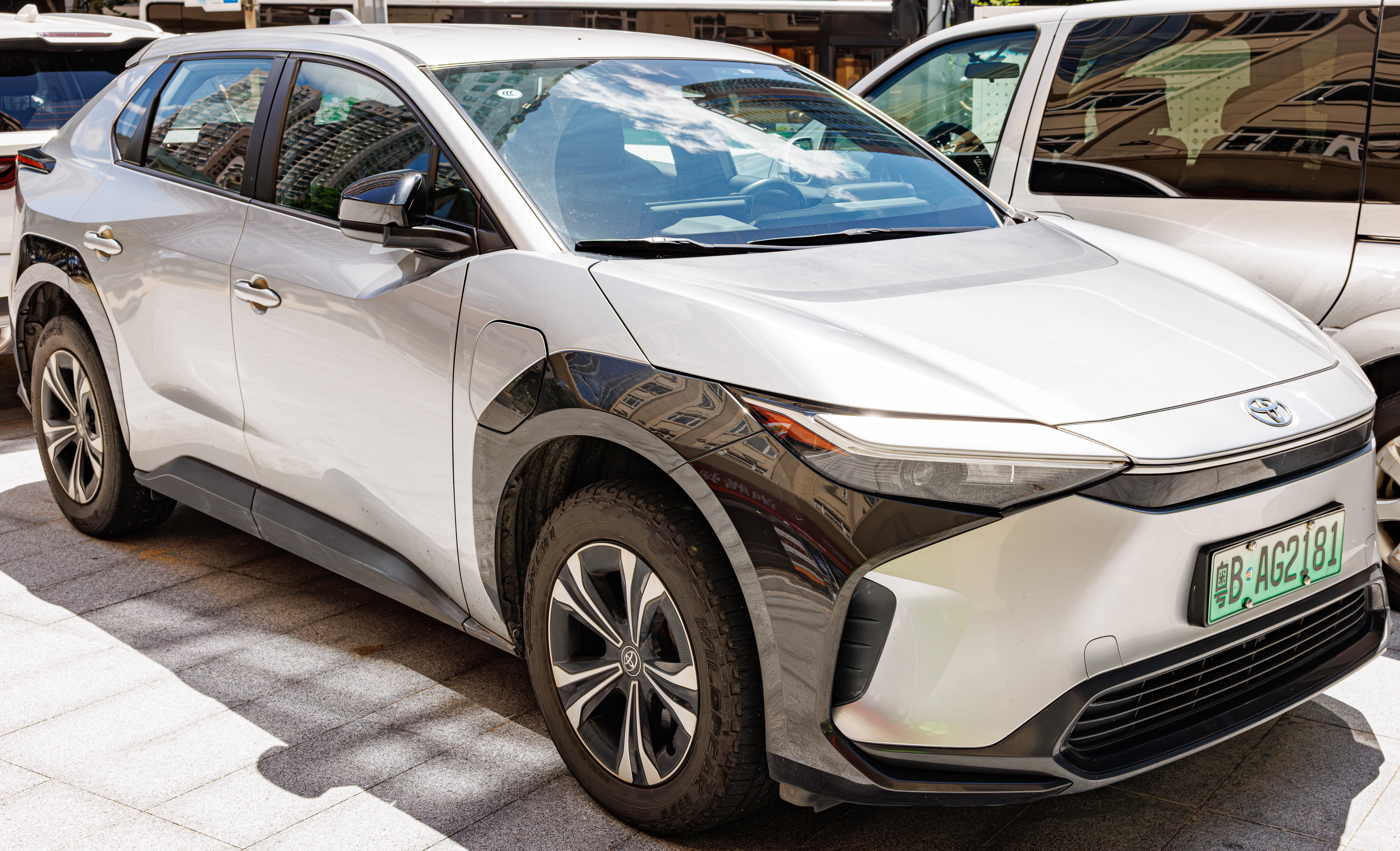
2022–2023
丰田bZ4X EA10
Toyota bZ4X EA10

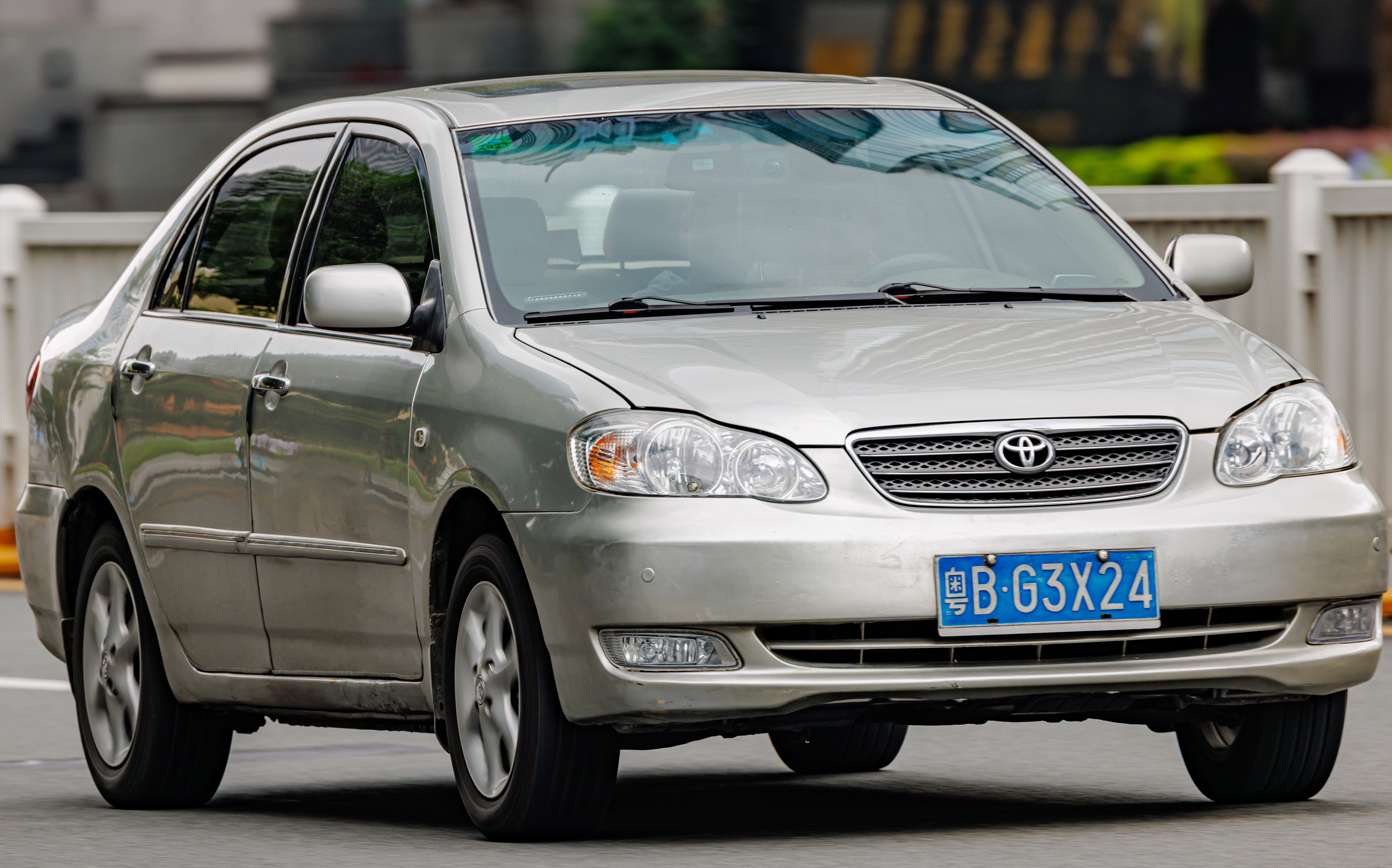
2004–2007
丰田花冠E120
Toyota Corolla E120

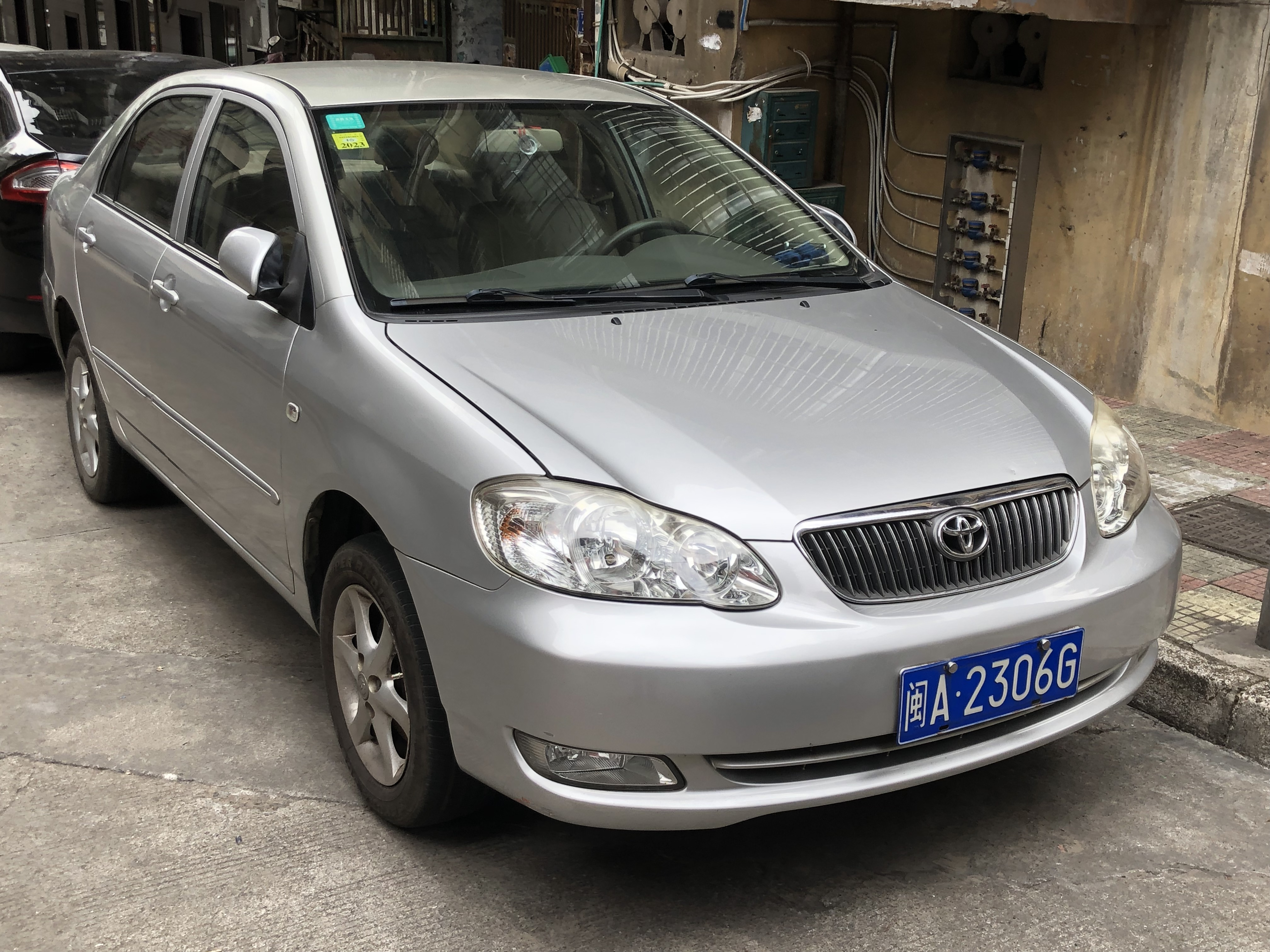
2007–2010
丰田花冠E120
Toyota Corolla EX E120

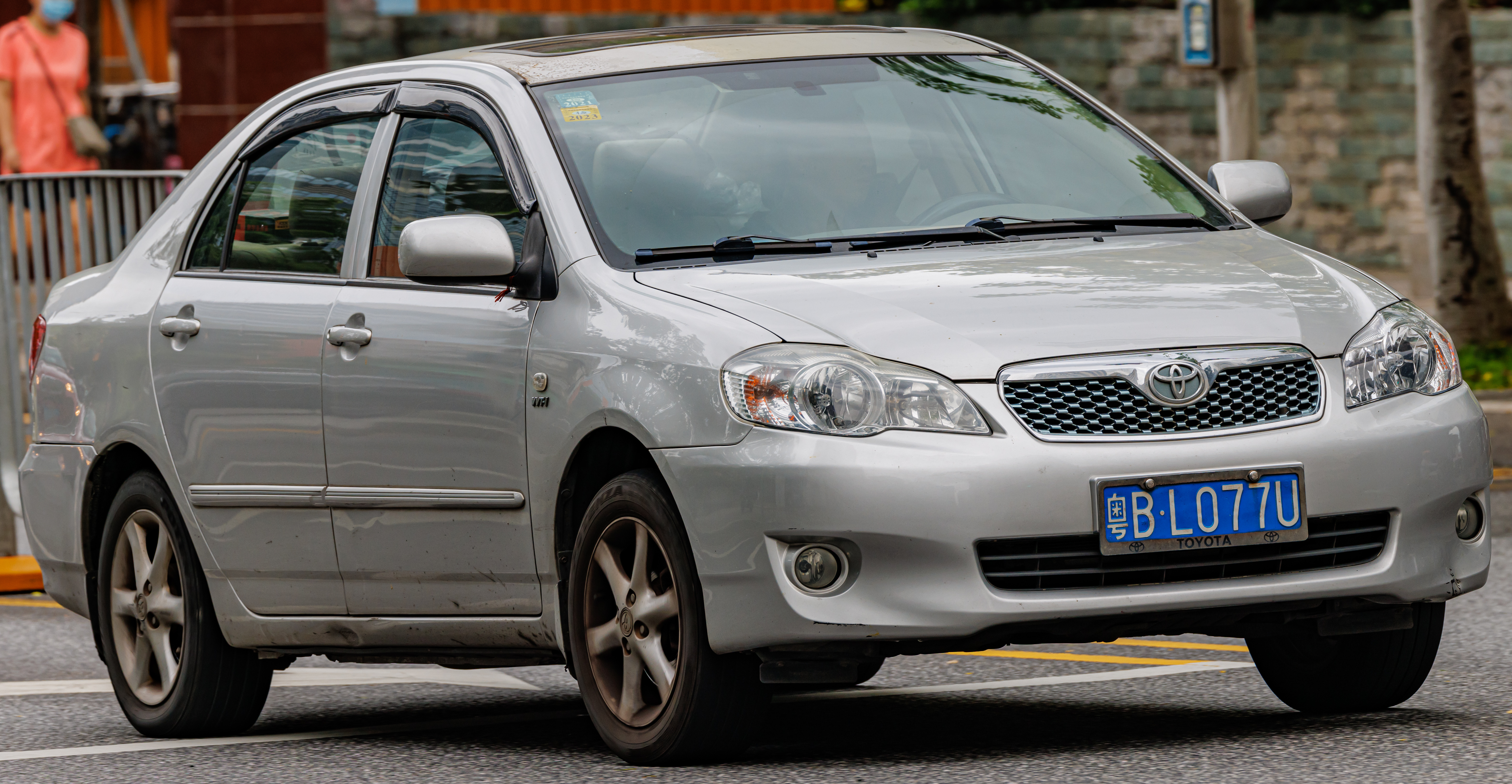
2010–2013
丰田花冠E120
Toyota Corolla EX E120

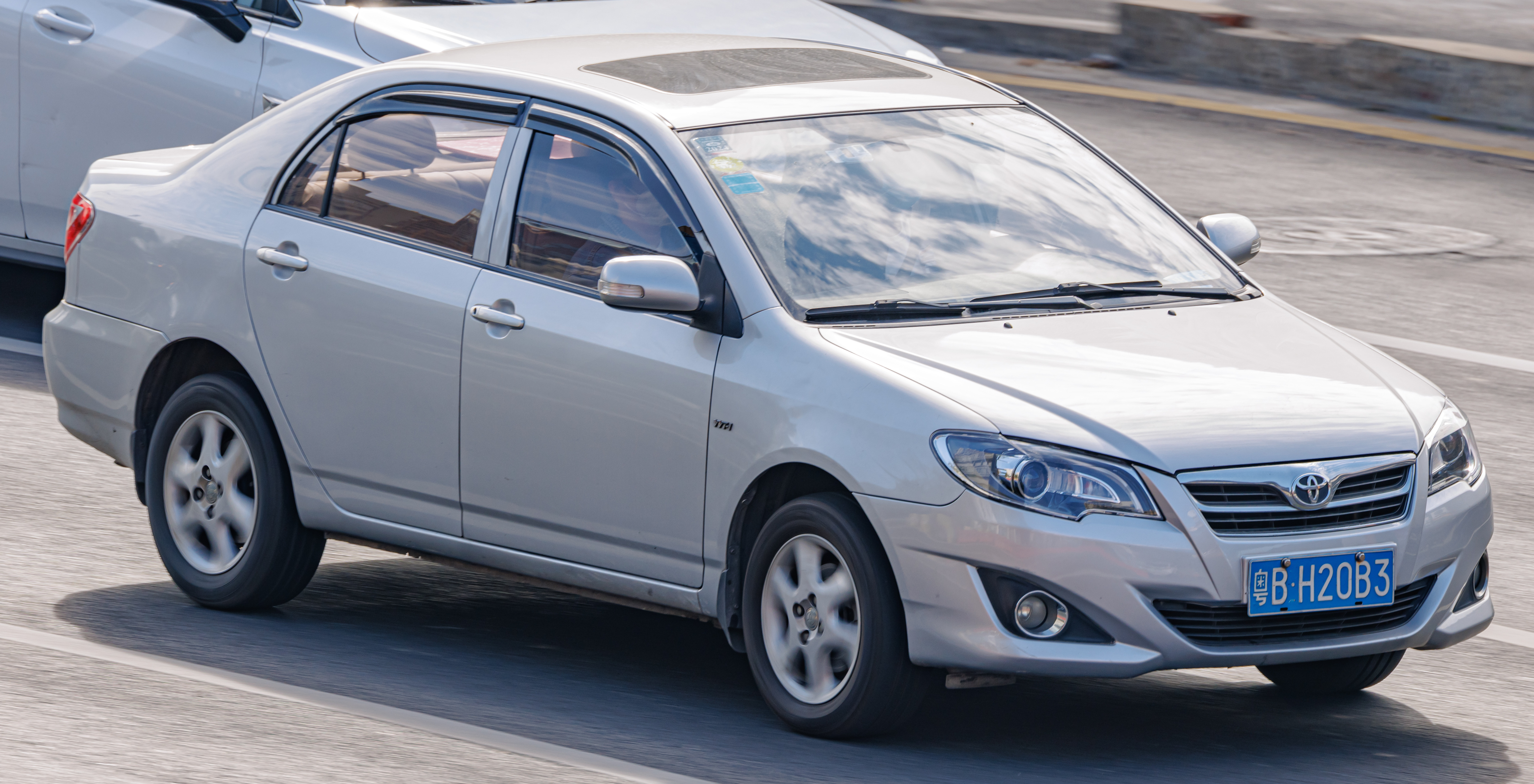
2013–2017
丰田花冠E120
Toyota Corolla EX E120

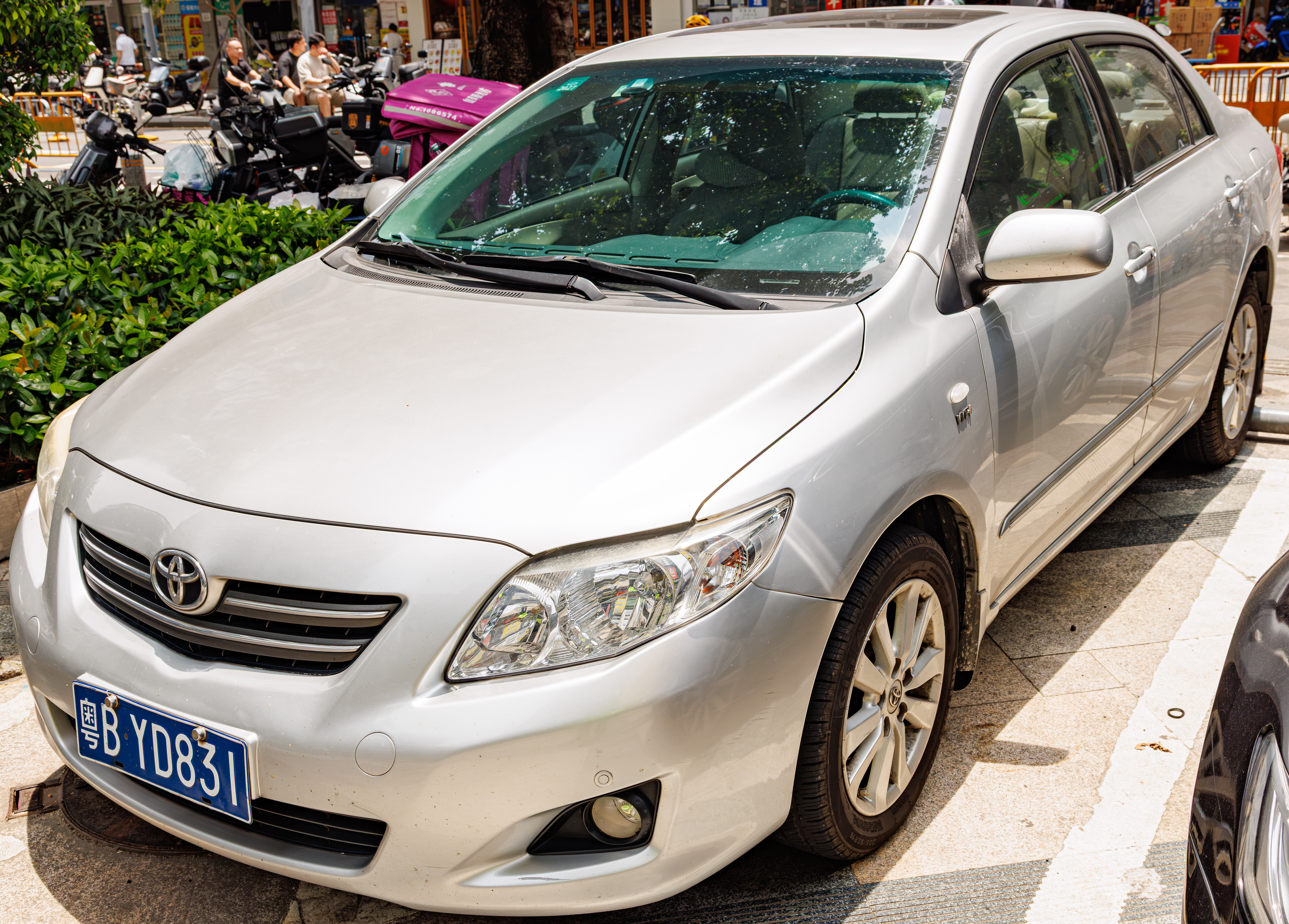
2007–2011
丰田卡罗拉E140
Toyota Corolla E140

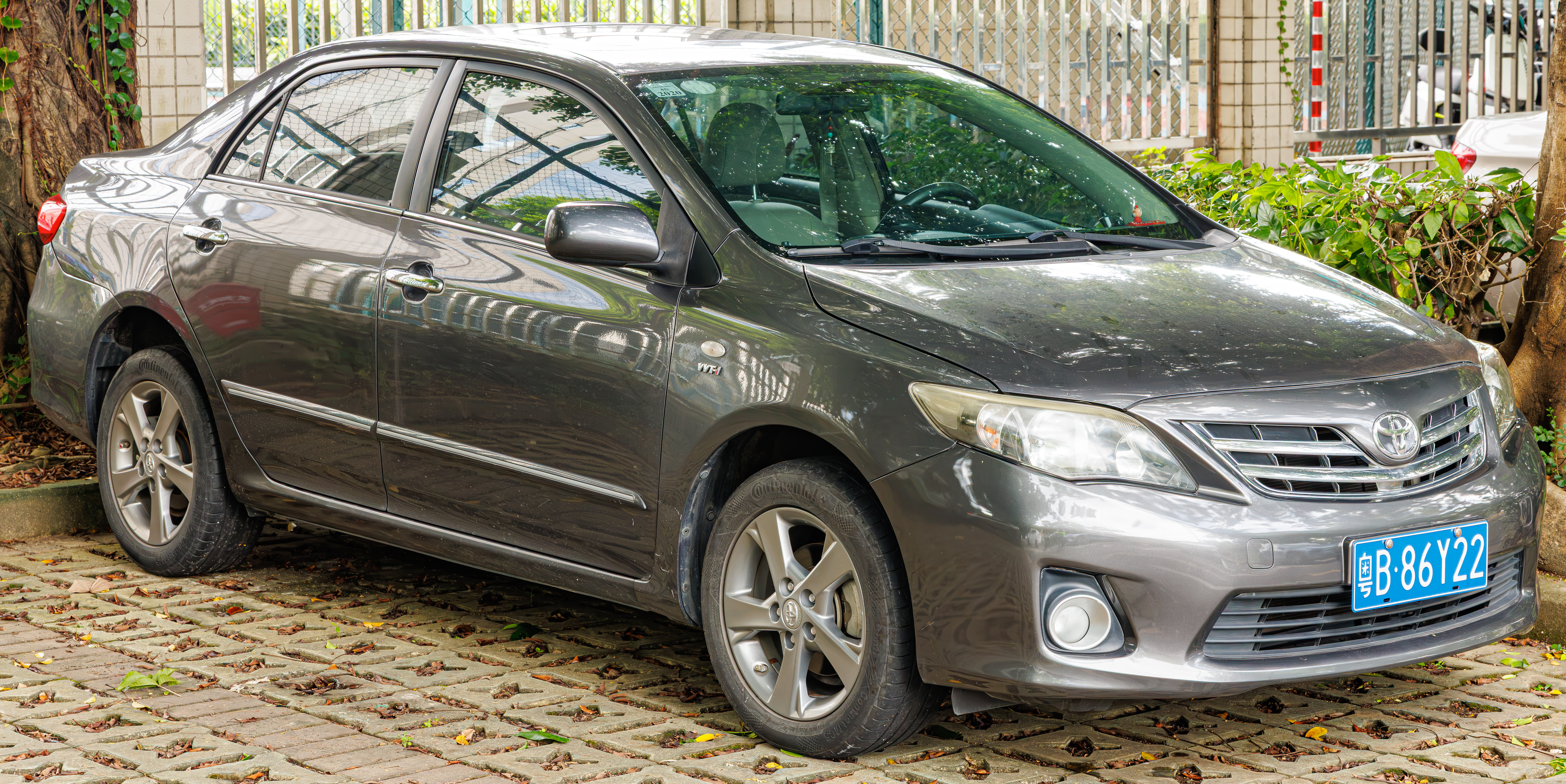
2011–2014
丰田卡罗拉E140
Toyota Corolla E140

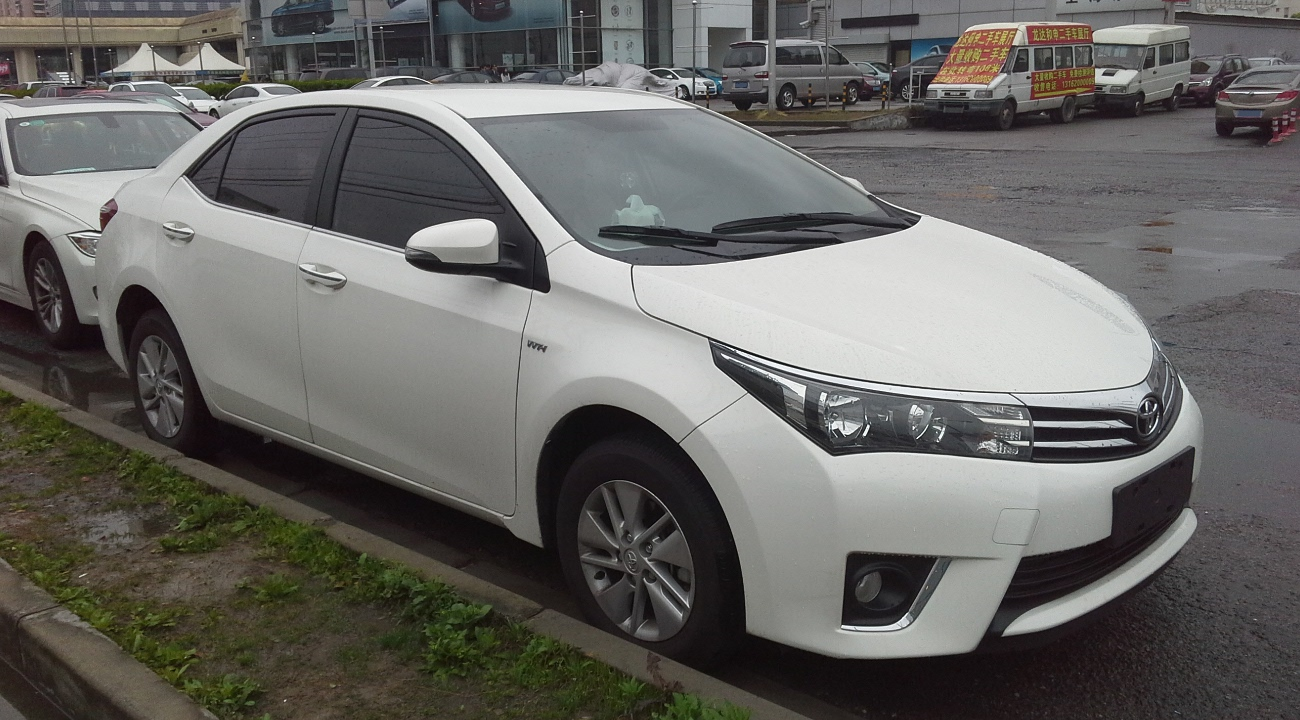
2014–2017
丰田卡罗拉E170
Toyota Corolla E170

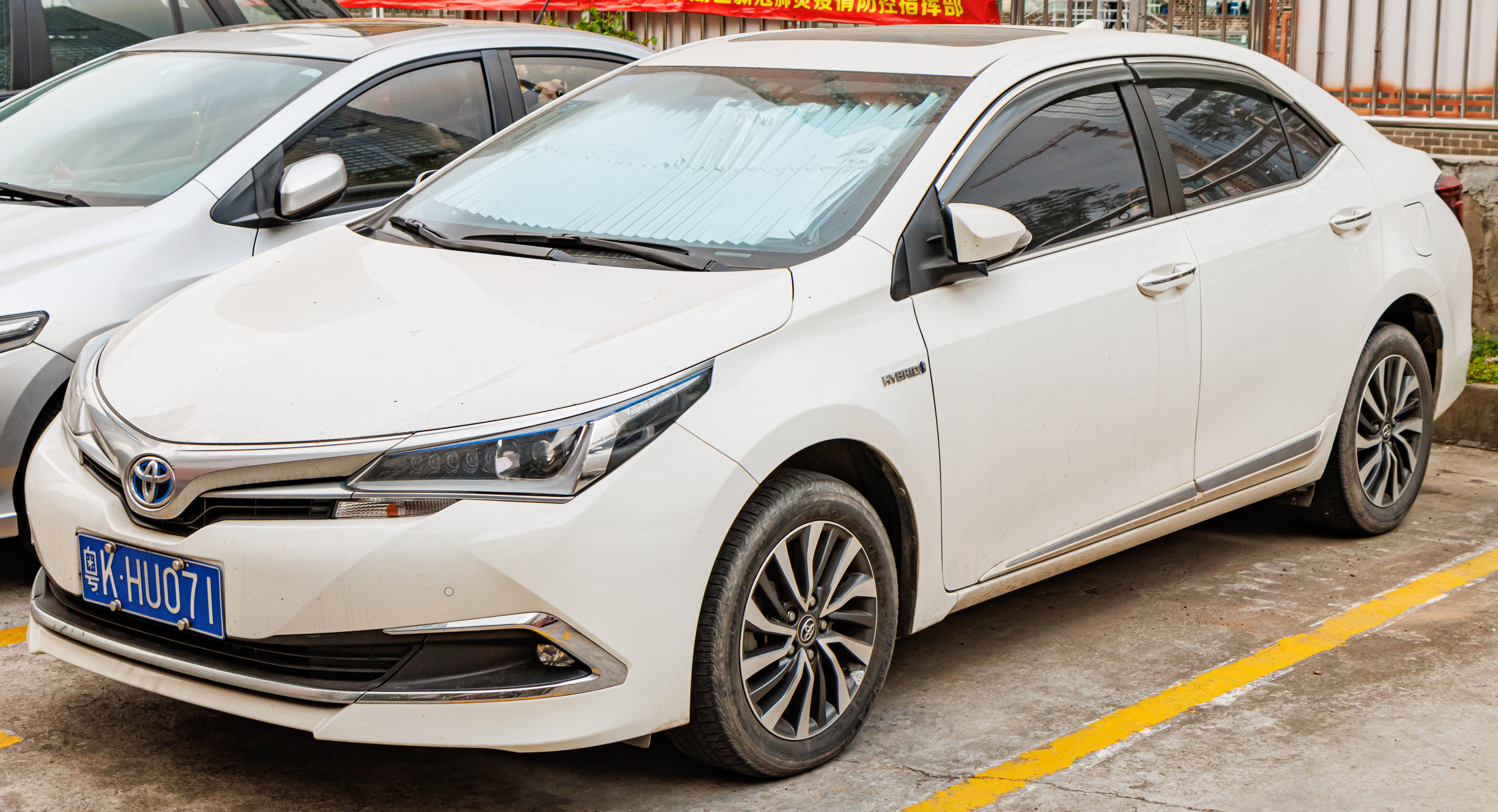
2015–2019
丰田卡罗拉双擎E170
Toyota Corolla Hybrid E170

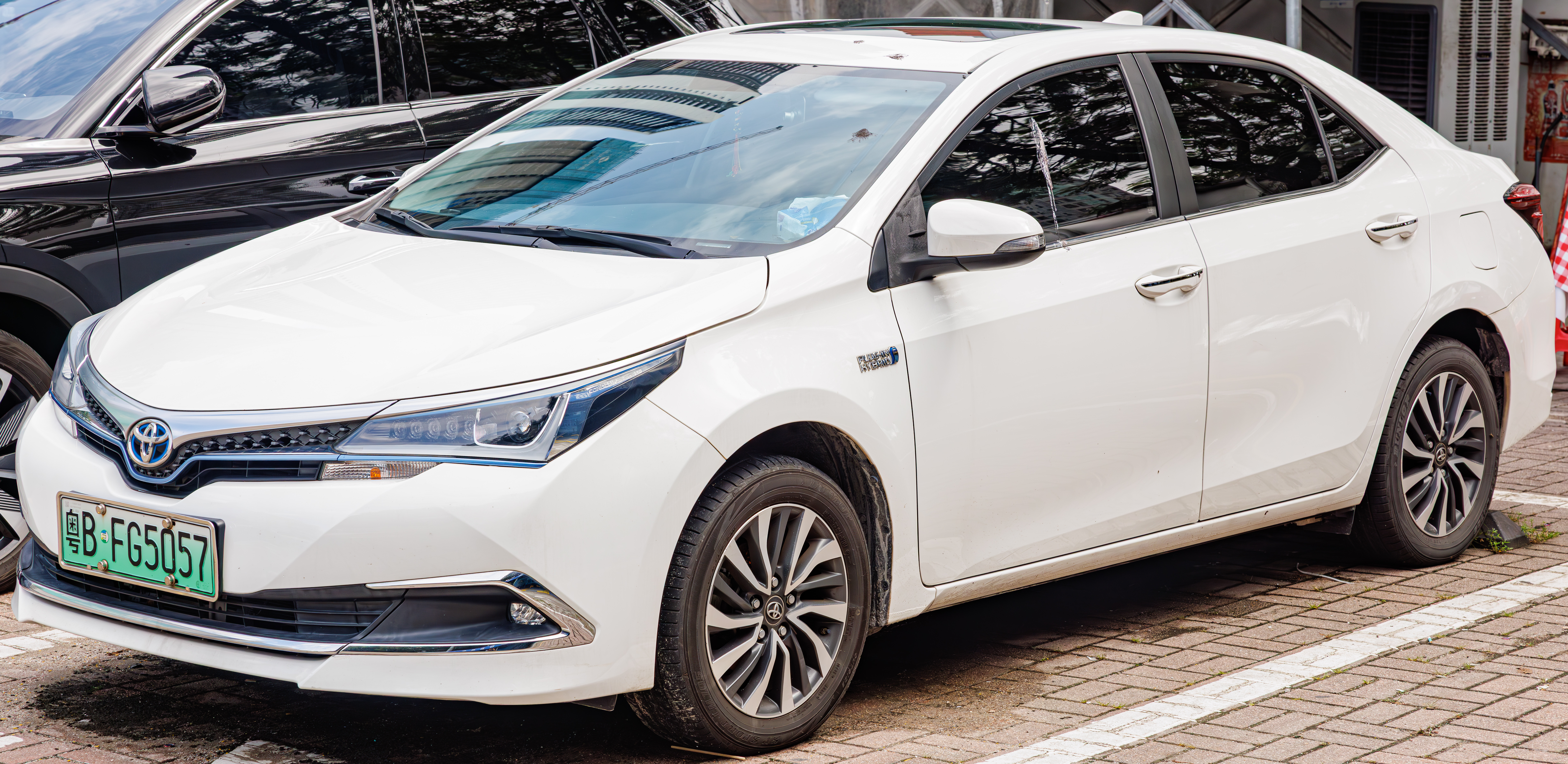
2015–2019
丰田卡罗拉双擎E+E170
Toyota Corolla Hybrid E+ E170

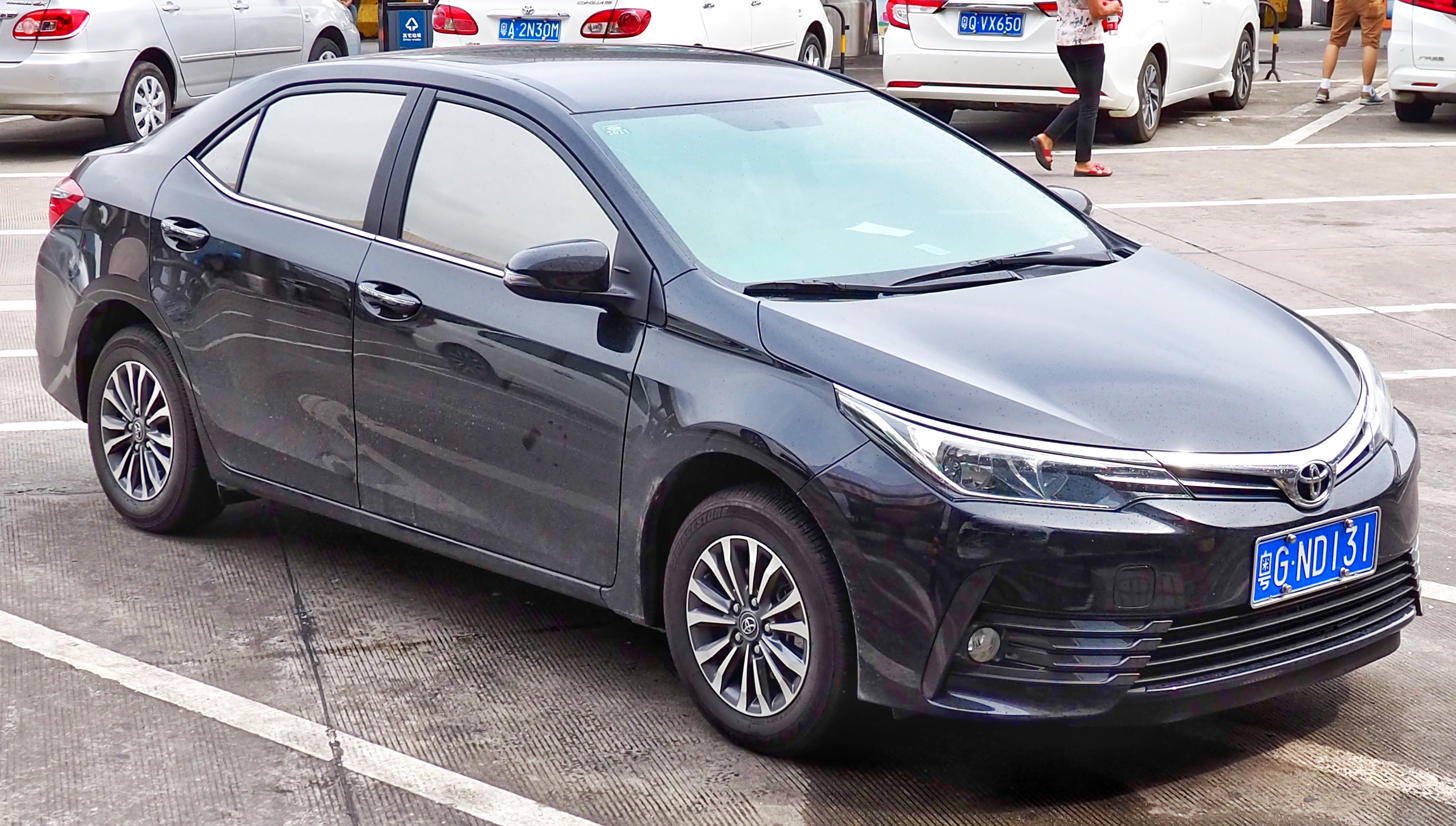
2017–2019
丰田卡罗拉E170
Toyota Corolla E170

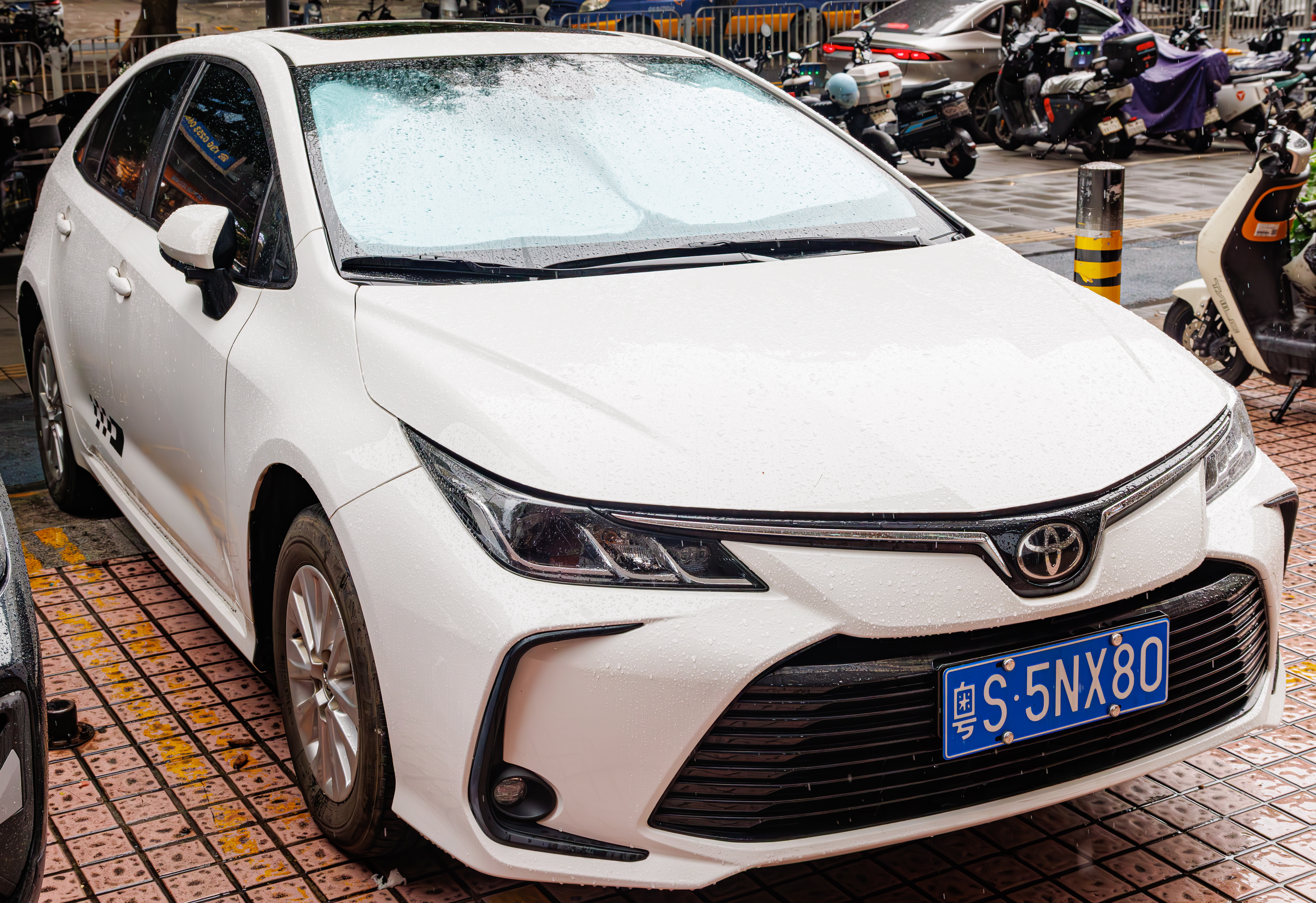
2019–2025
丰田卡罗拉E210
Toyota Corolla E210

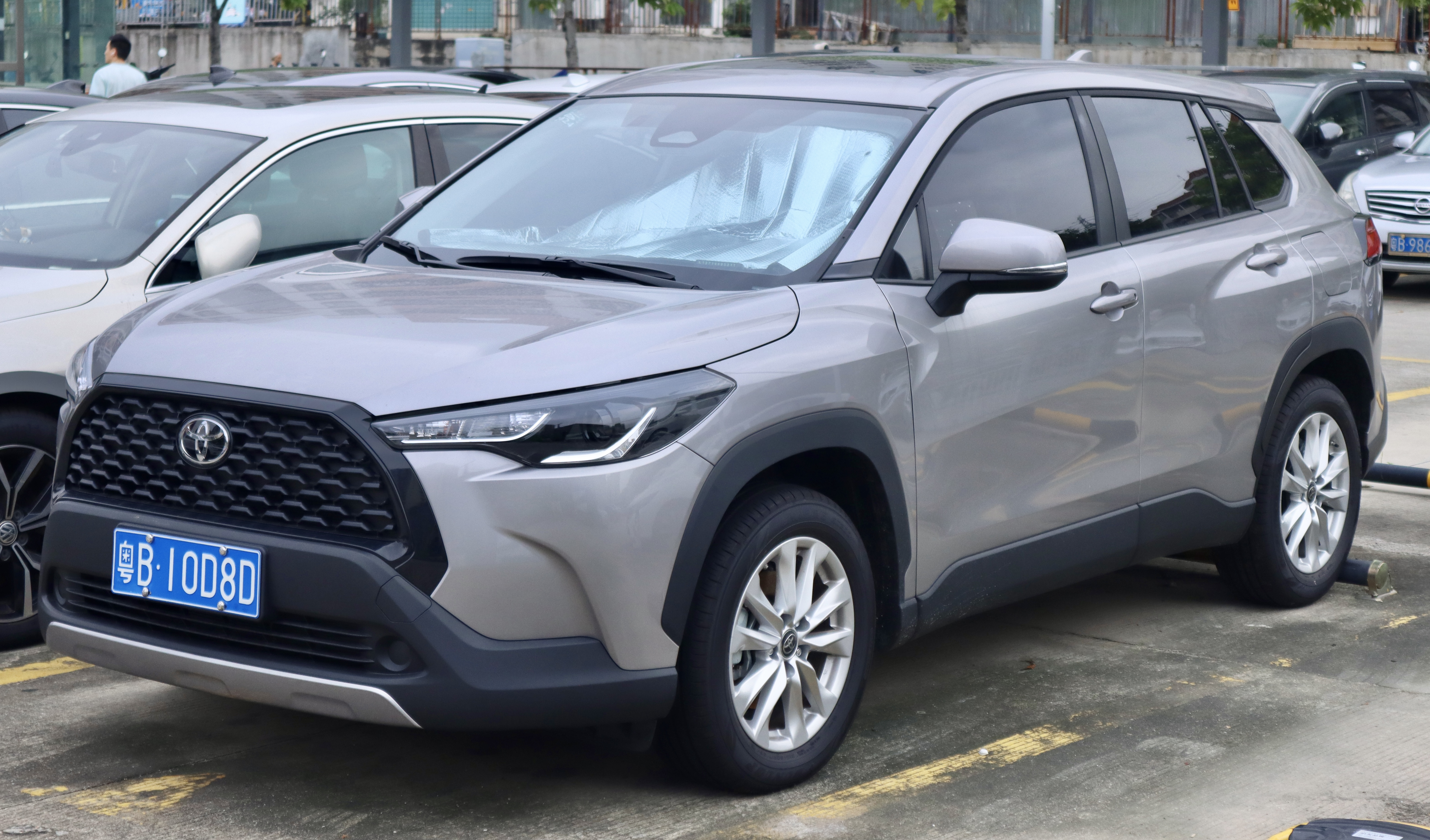
2021–2025
丰田卡罗拉锐放XG10
Toyota Corolla Cross XG10

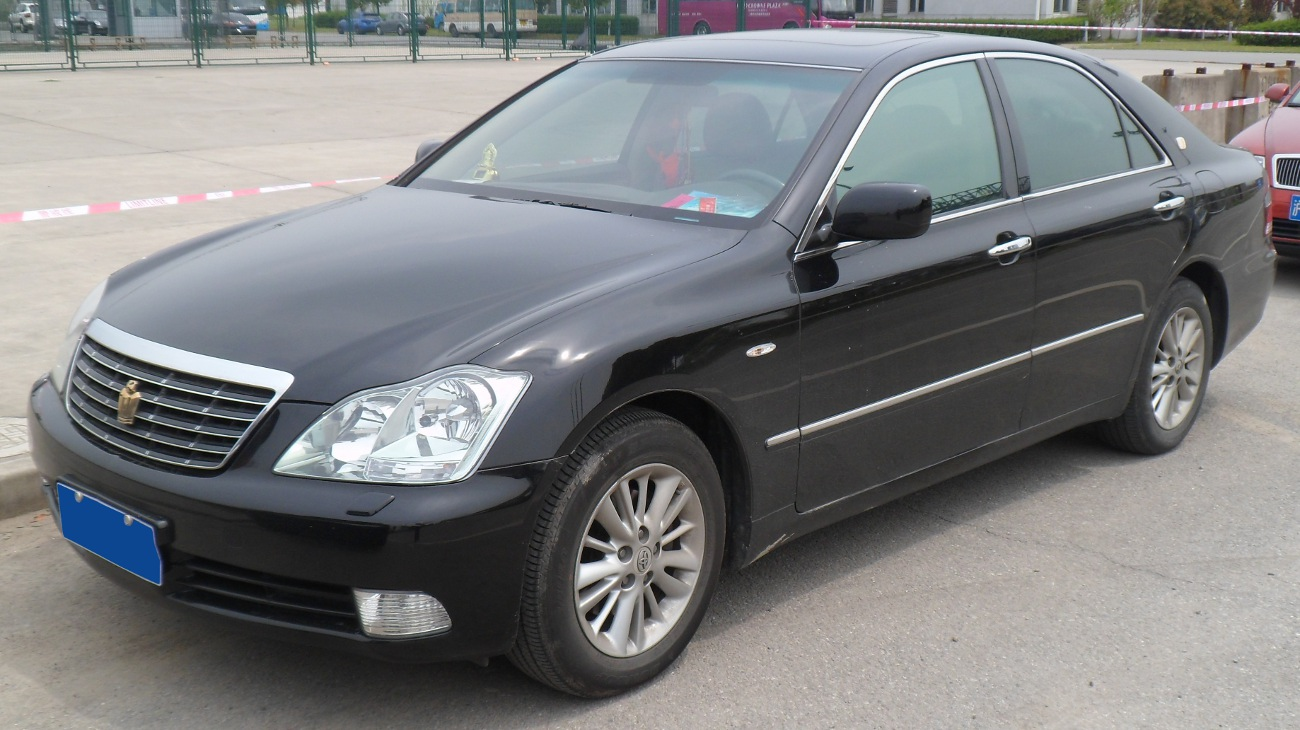
2005–2009
丰田皇冠S180
Toyota Crown S180

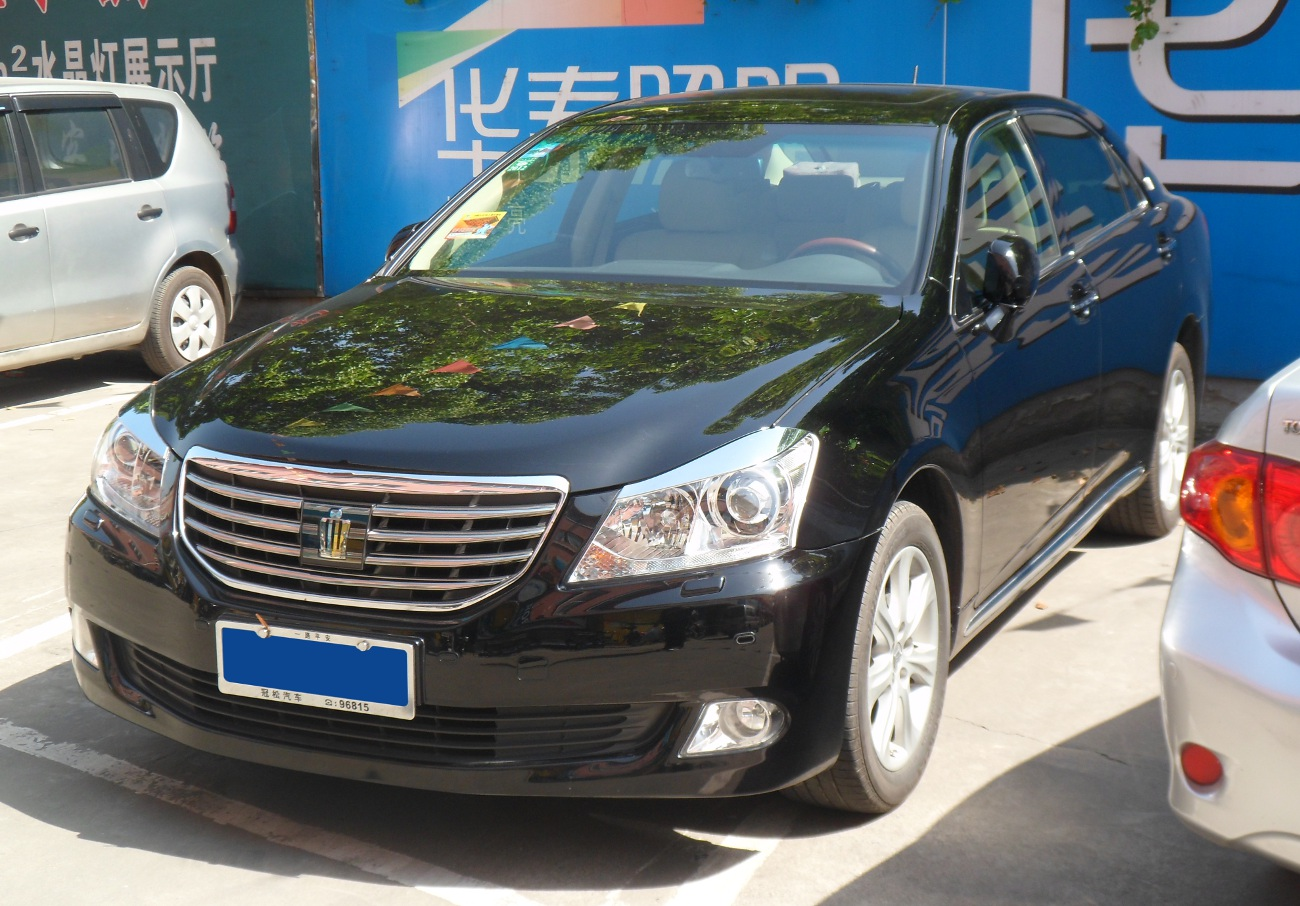
2009–2012
丰田皇冠S200
Toyota Crown S200

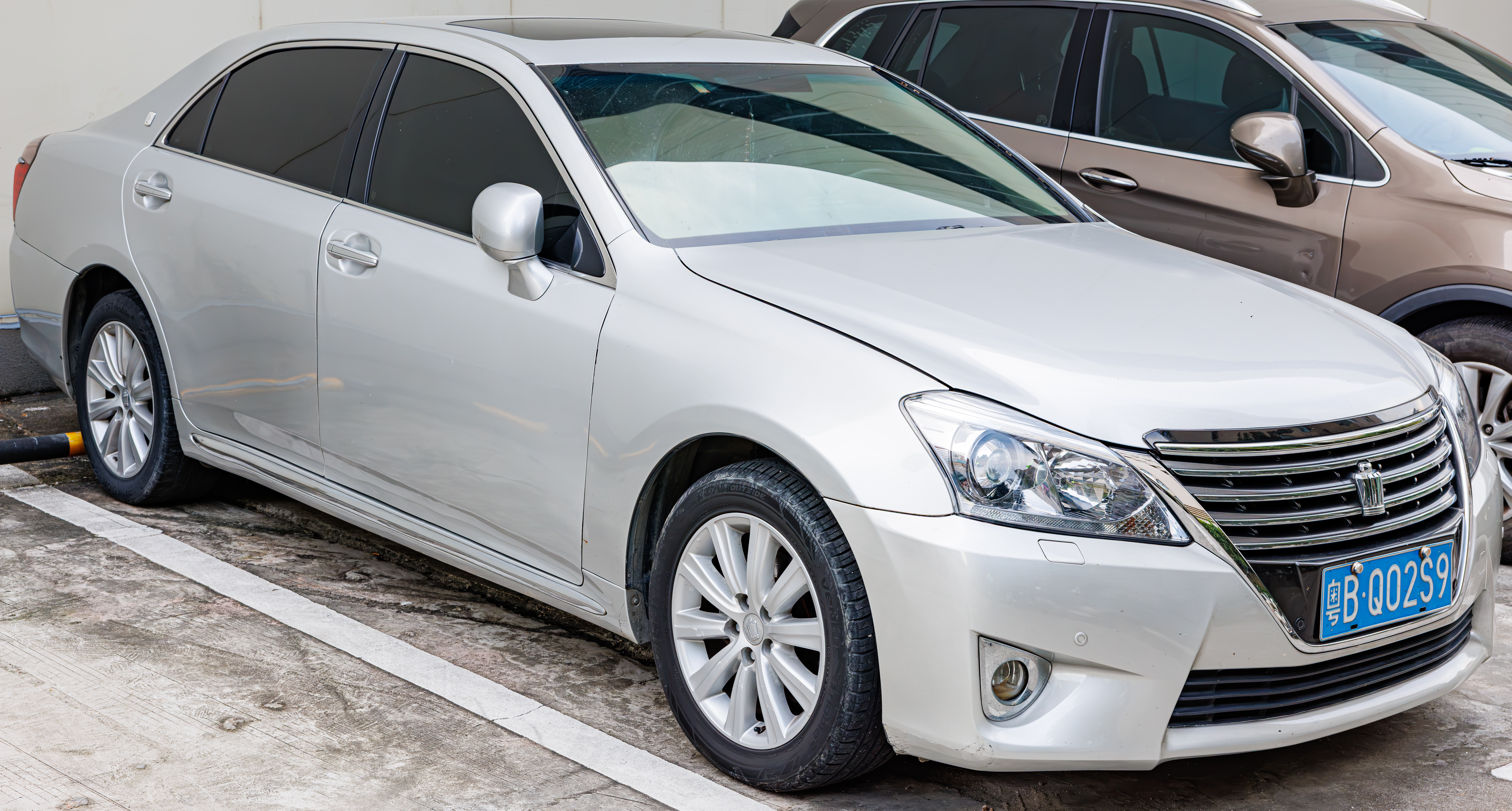
2012–2015
丰田皇冠S200
Toyota Crown S200

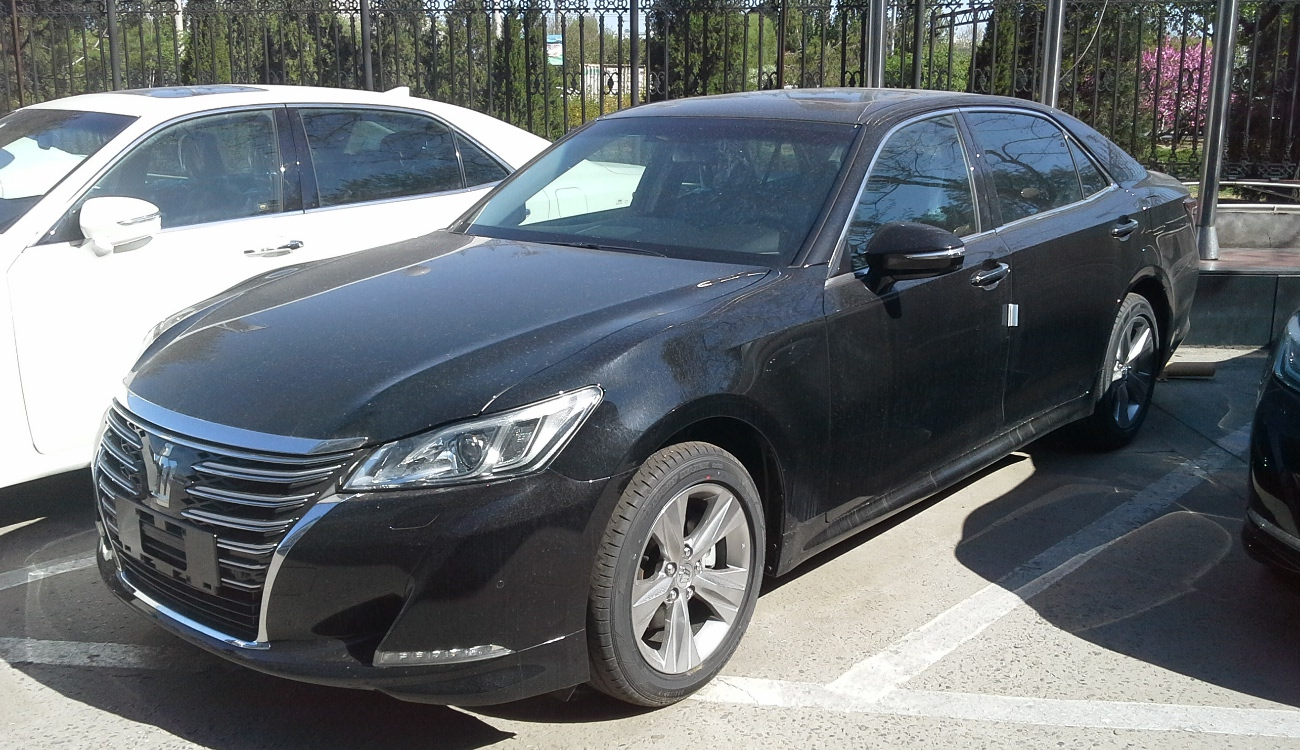
2015–2020
丰田皇冠S210
Toyota Crown S210

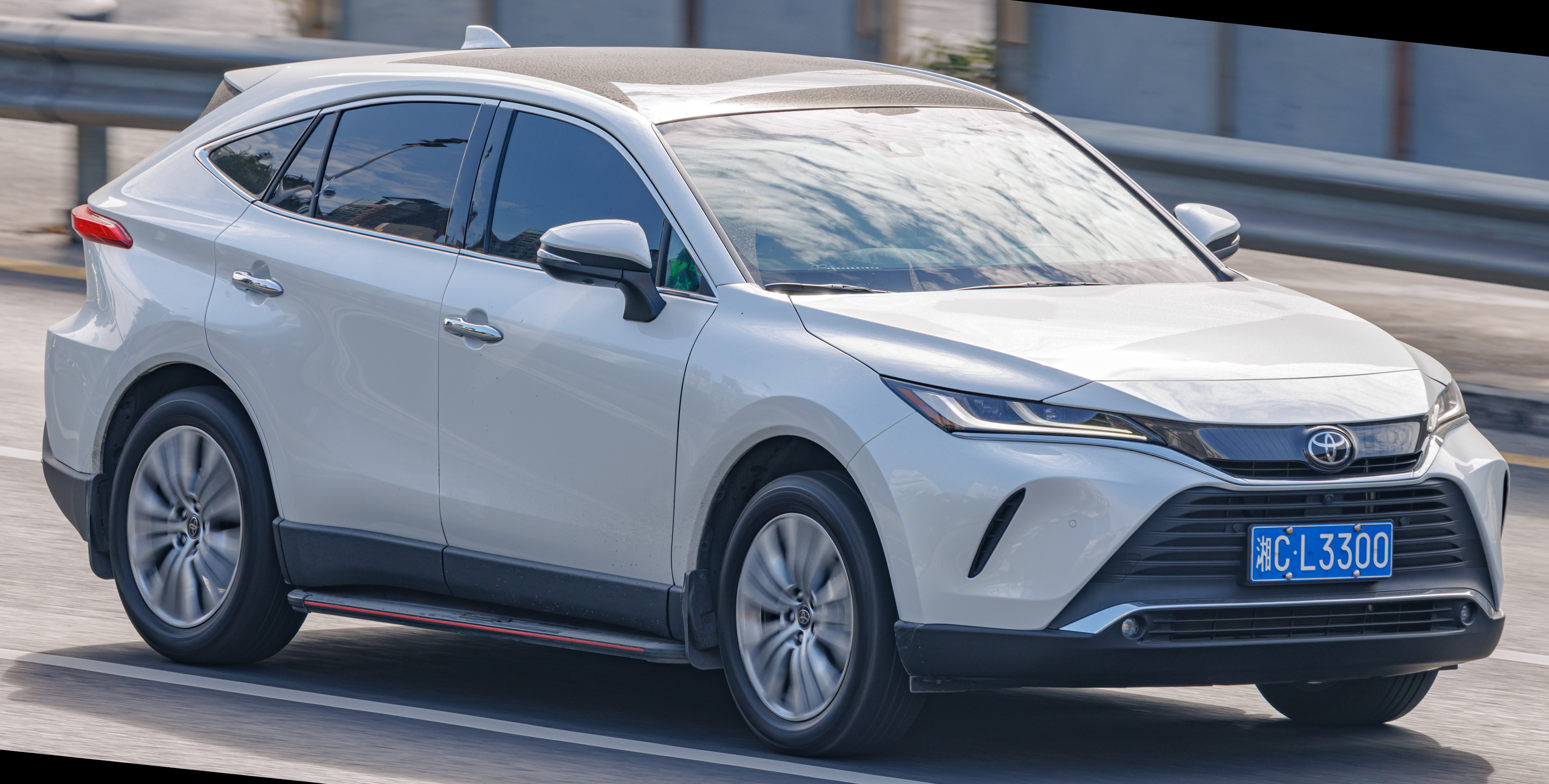
2021–2026
丰田凌放XU80
Toyota Harrier XU80

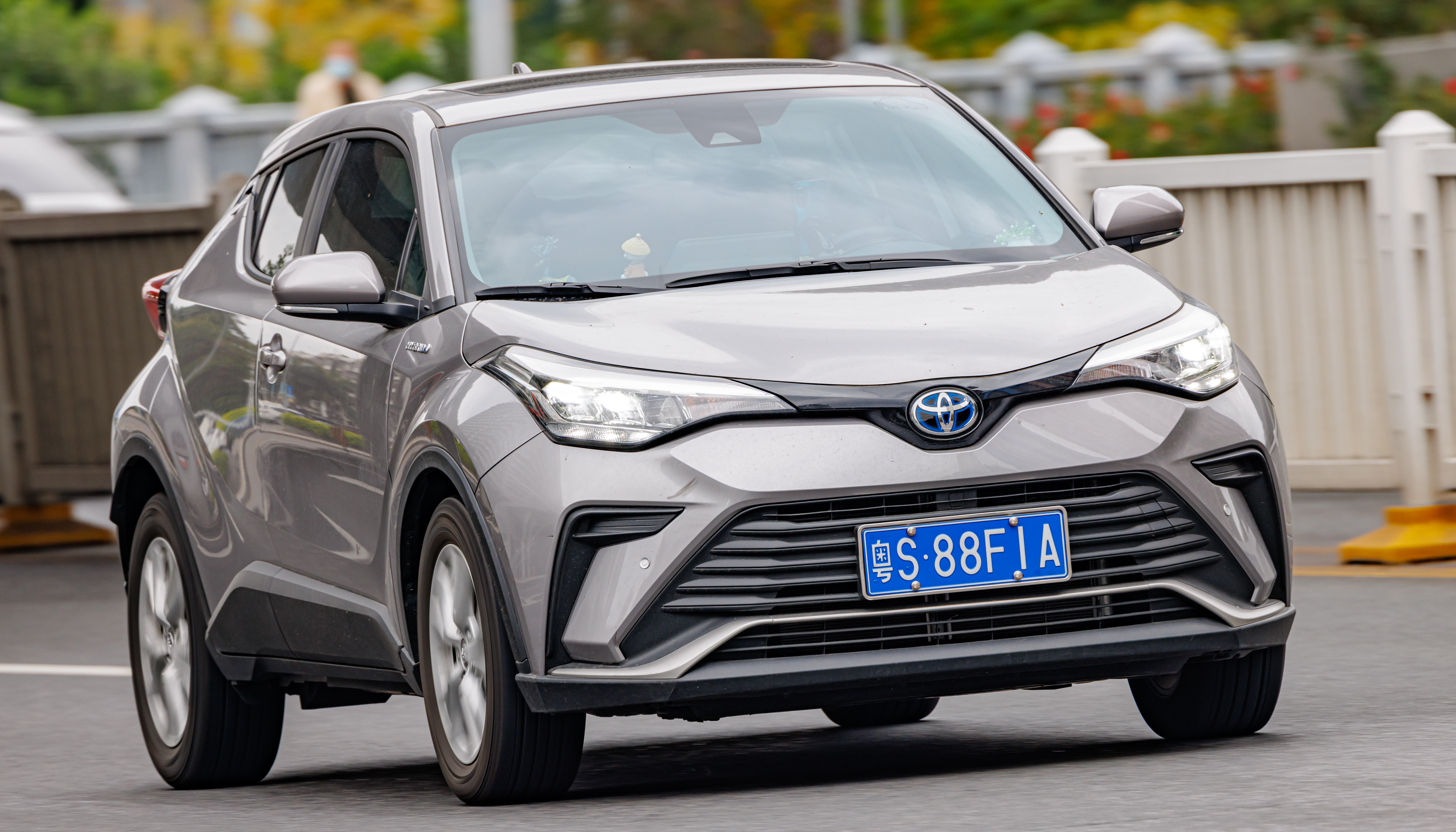
2018–2024
丰田奕泽AX10
Toyota IZOA AX10

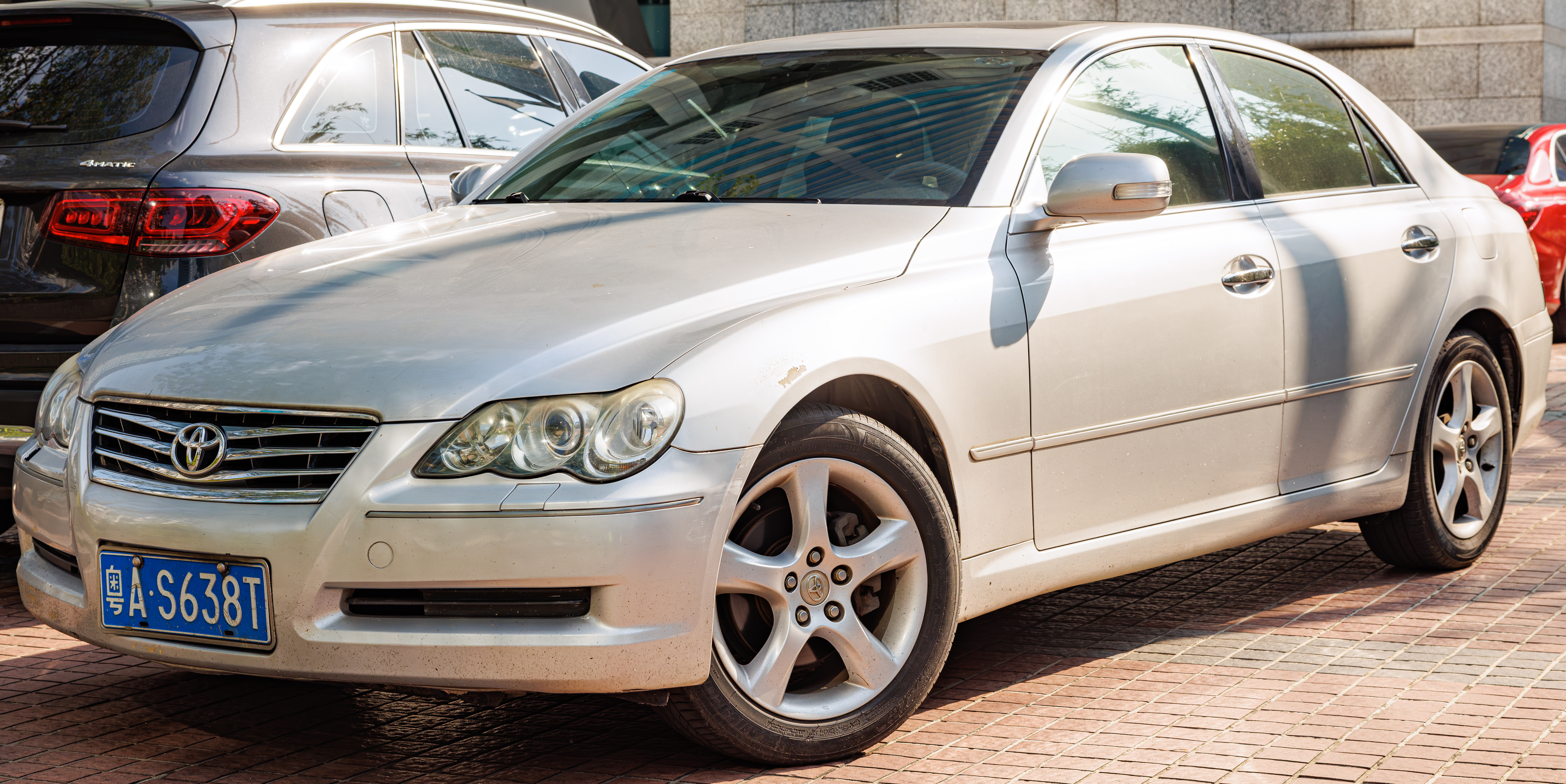
2004–2009
丰田锐志X120
Toyota Reiz X120

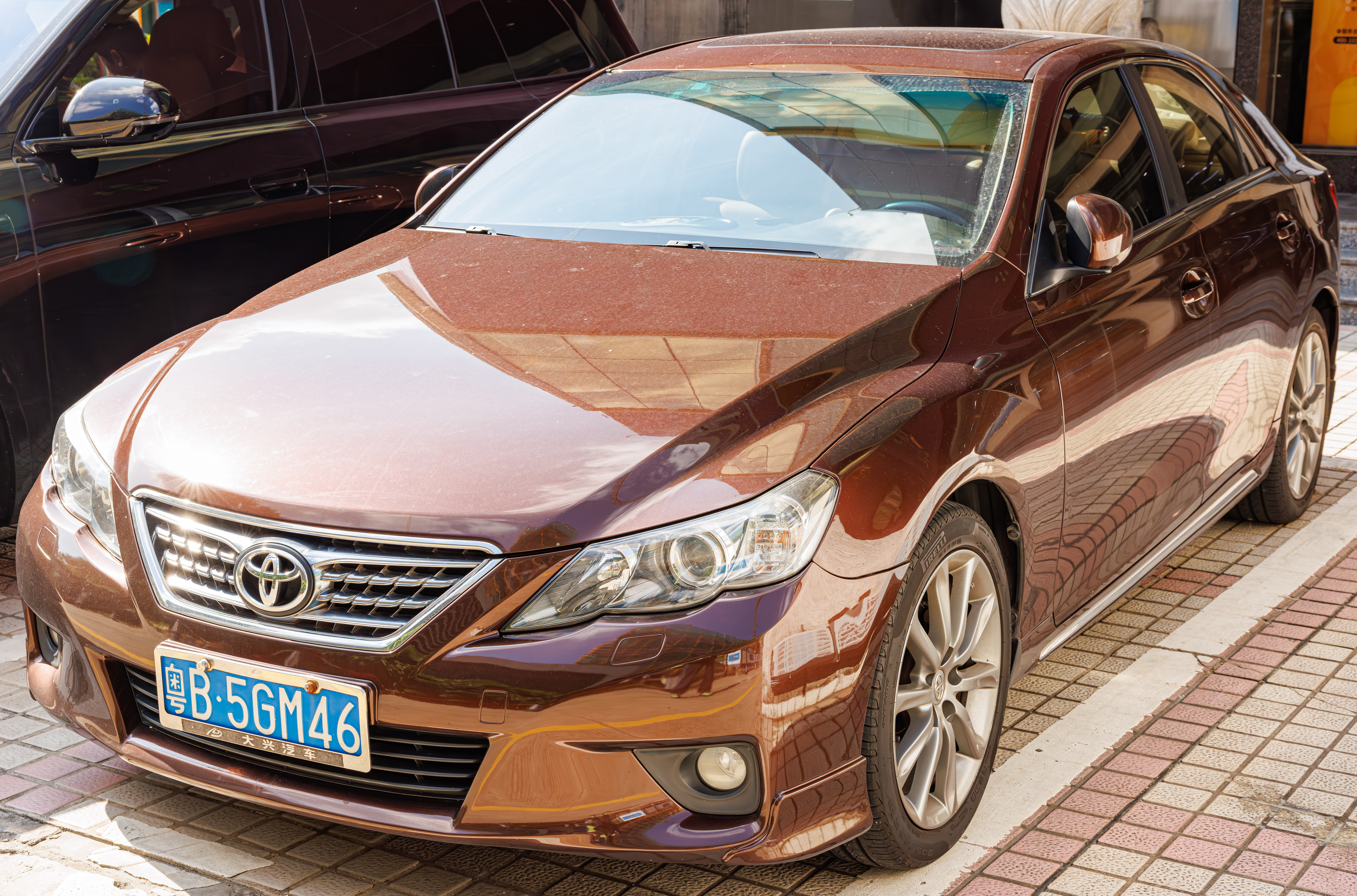
2009–2013
丰田锐志X130
Toyota Reiz X130

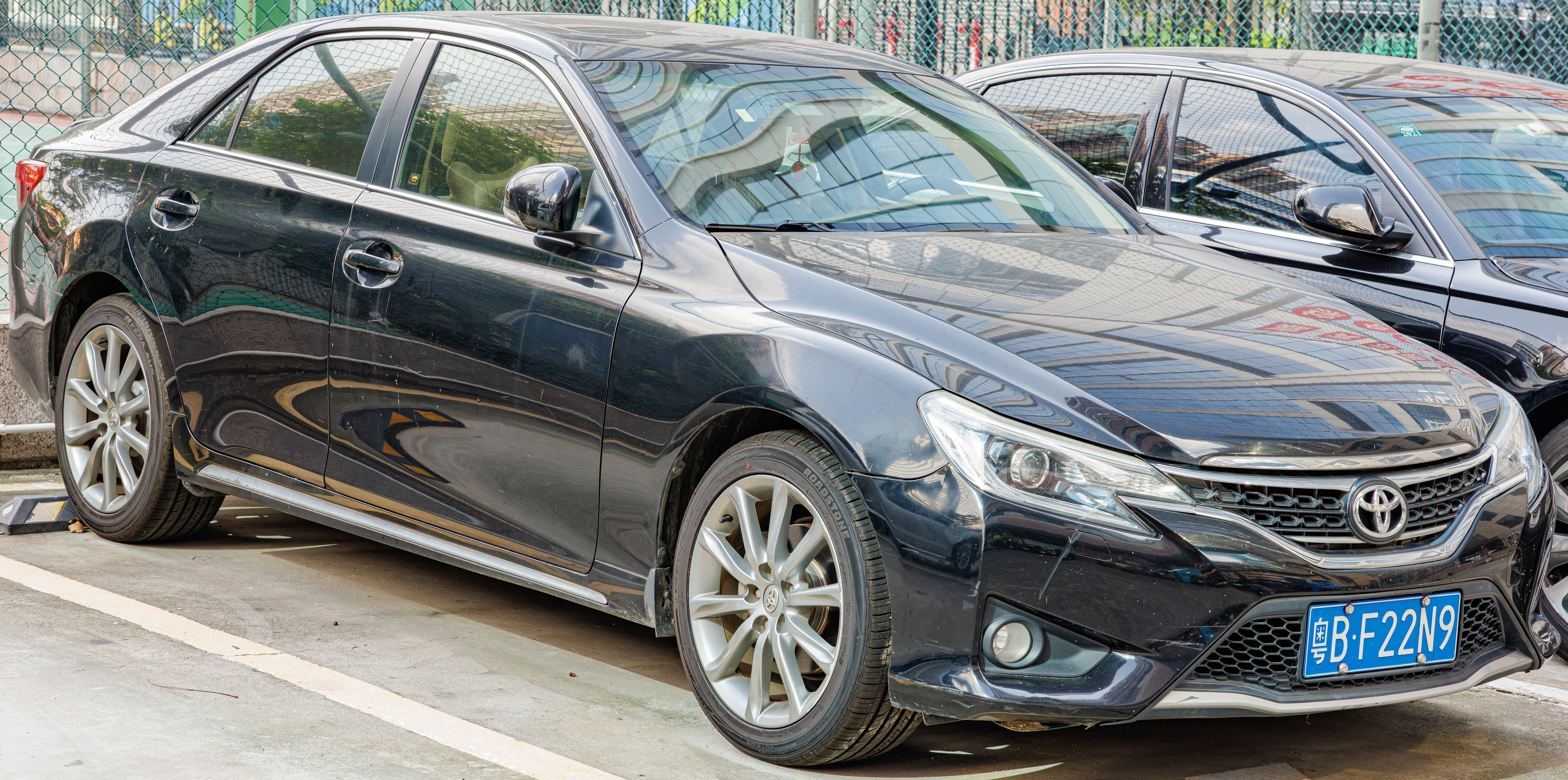
2013–2017
丰田锐志X130
Toyota Reiz X130

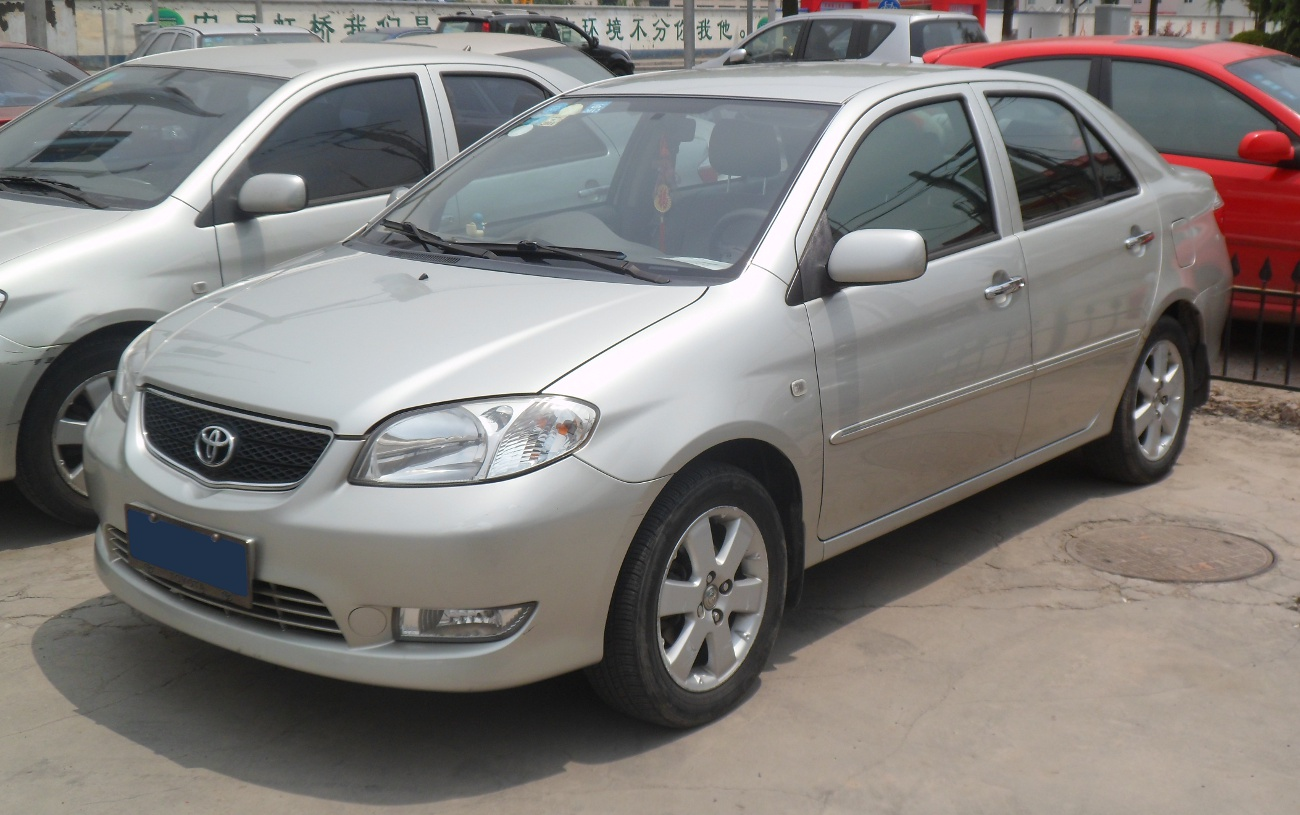
2004–2008
丰田威驰XP40
Toyota Vios XP40

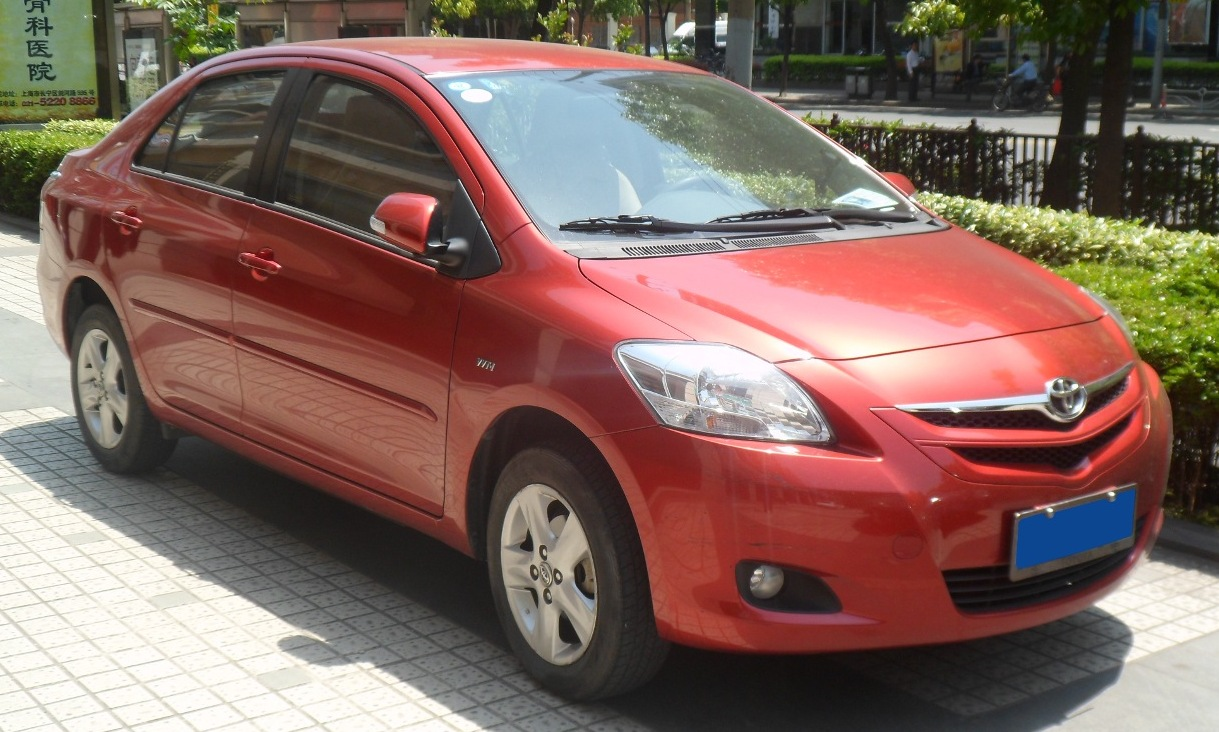
2008–2013
丰田威驰XP90
Toyota Vios XP90

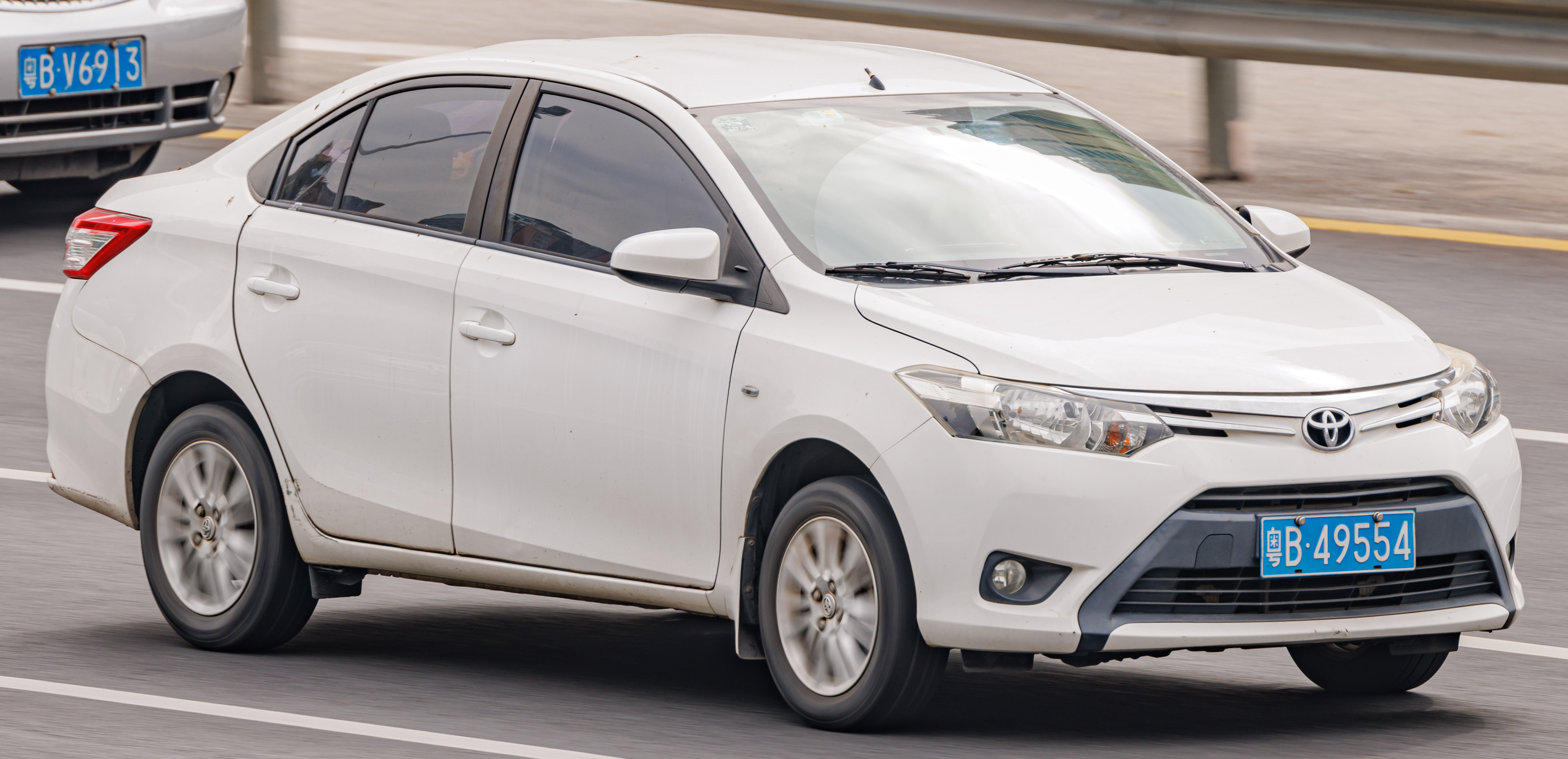
2013–2016
丰田威驰XP150
Toyota Vios XP150

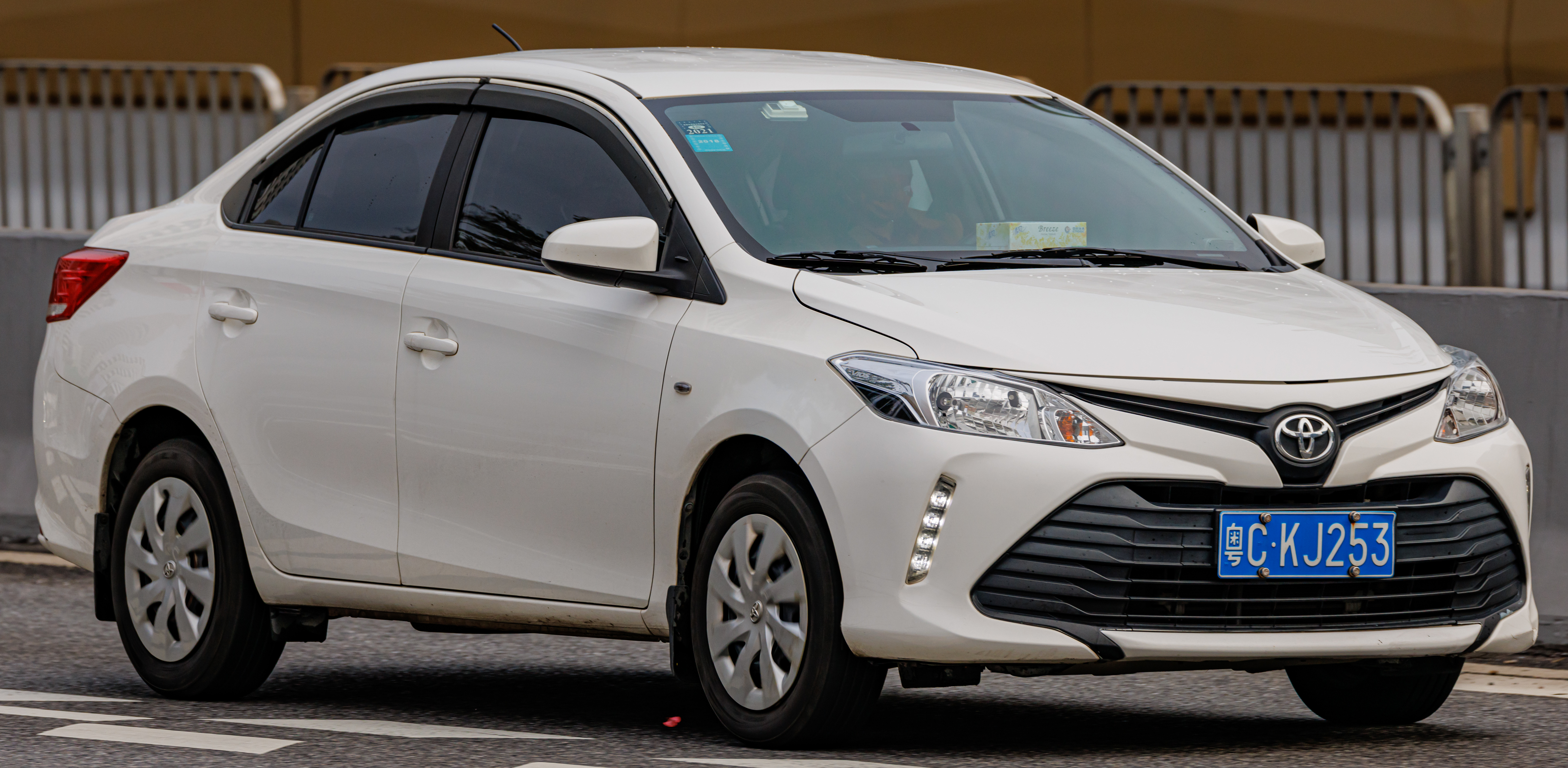
2016–2020
丰田威驰XP150
Toyota Vios XP150

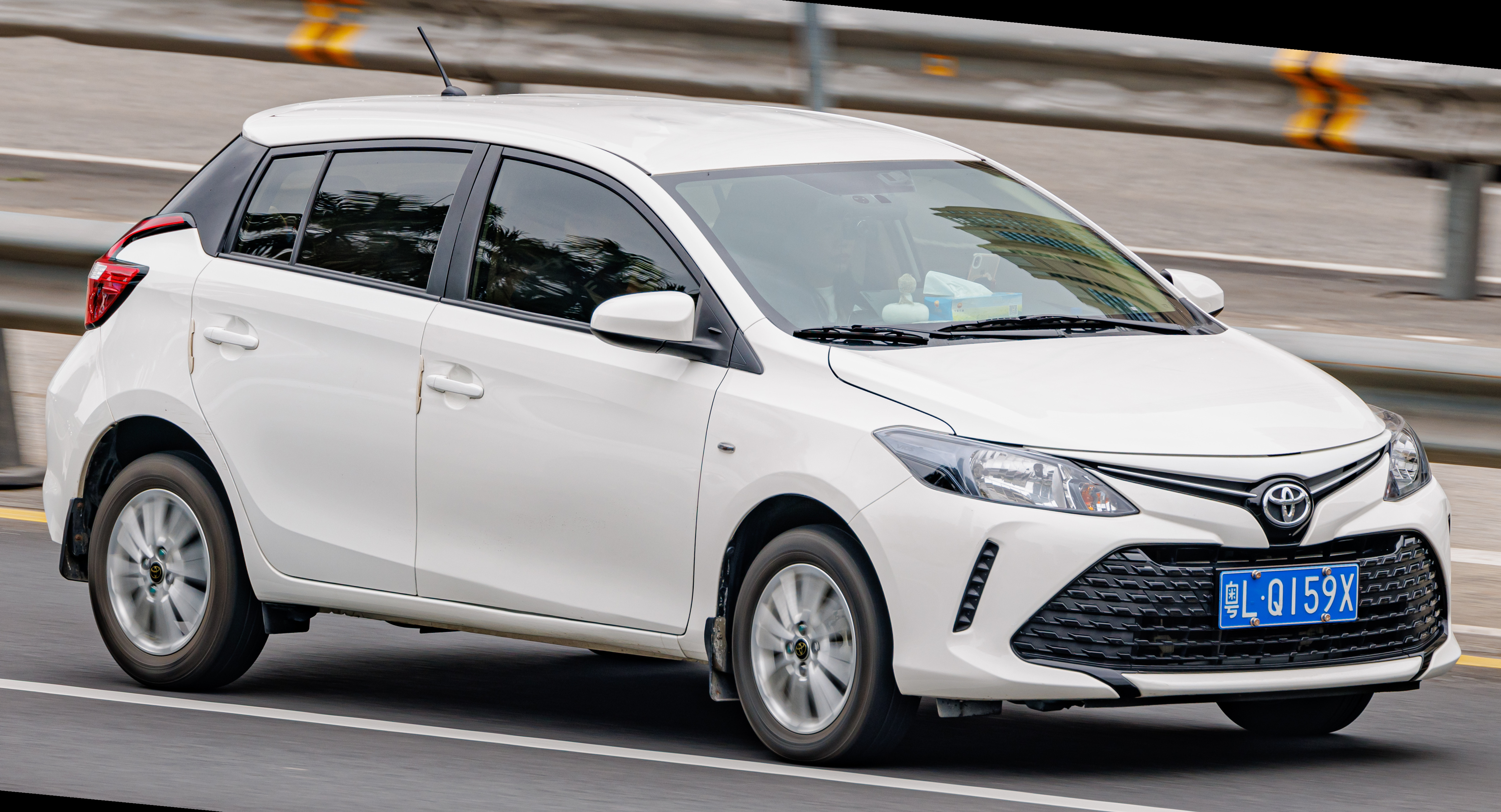
2016–2020
丰田威驰FS XP150
Toyota Vios FS XP150

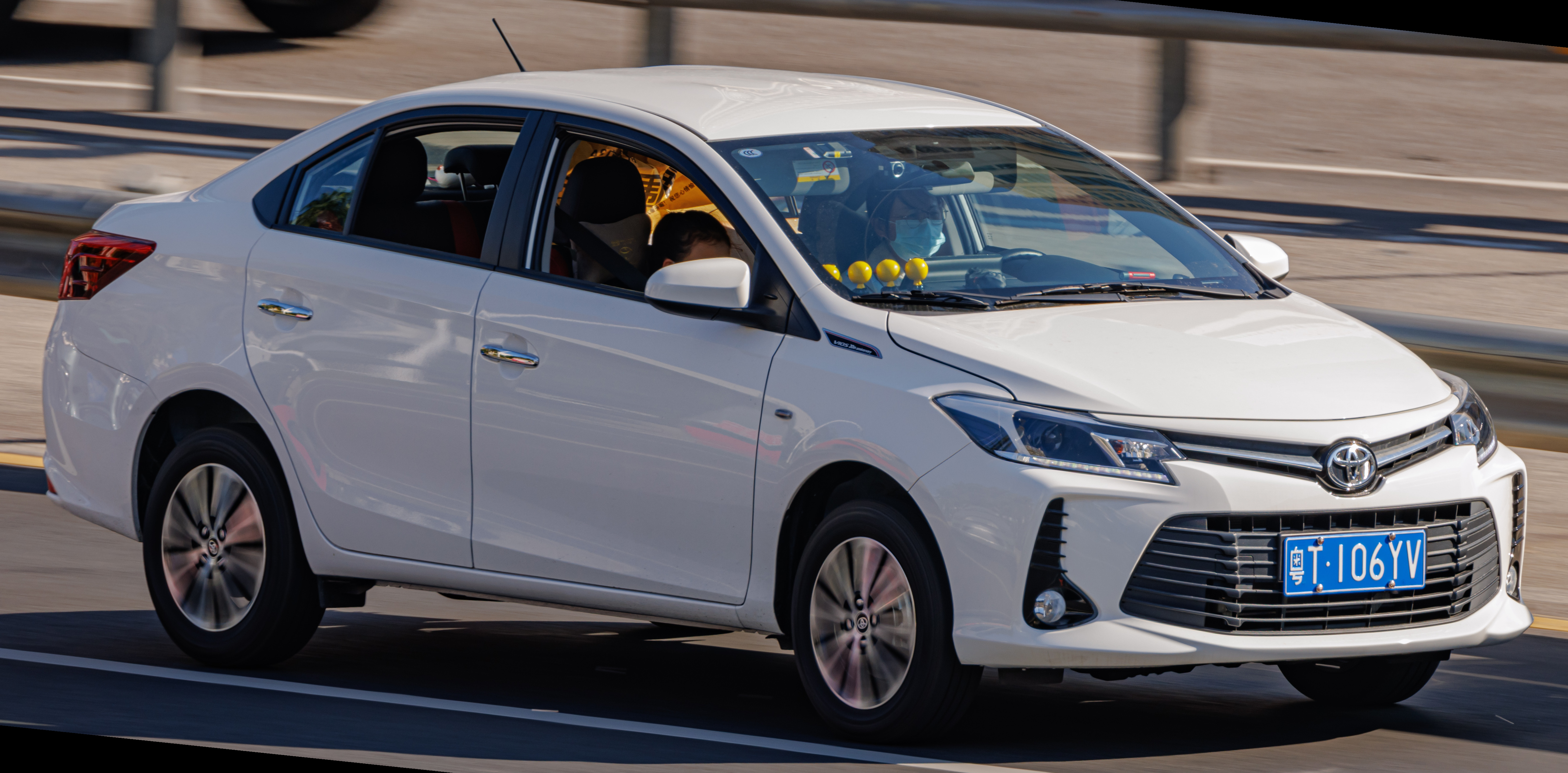
2020–2023
丰田威驰XP150
Toyota Vios XP150

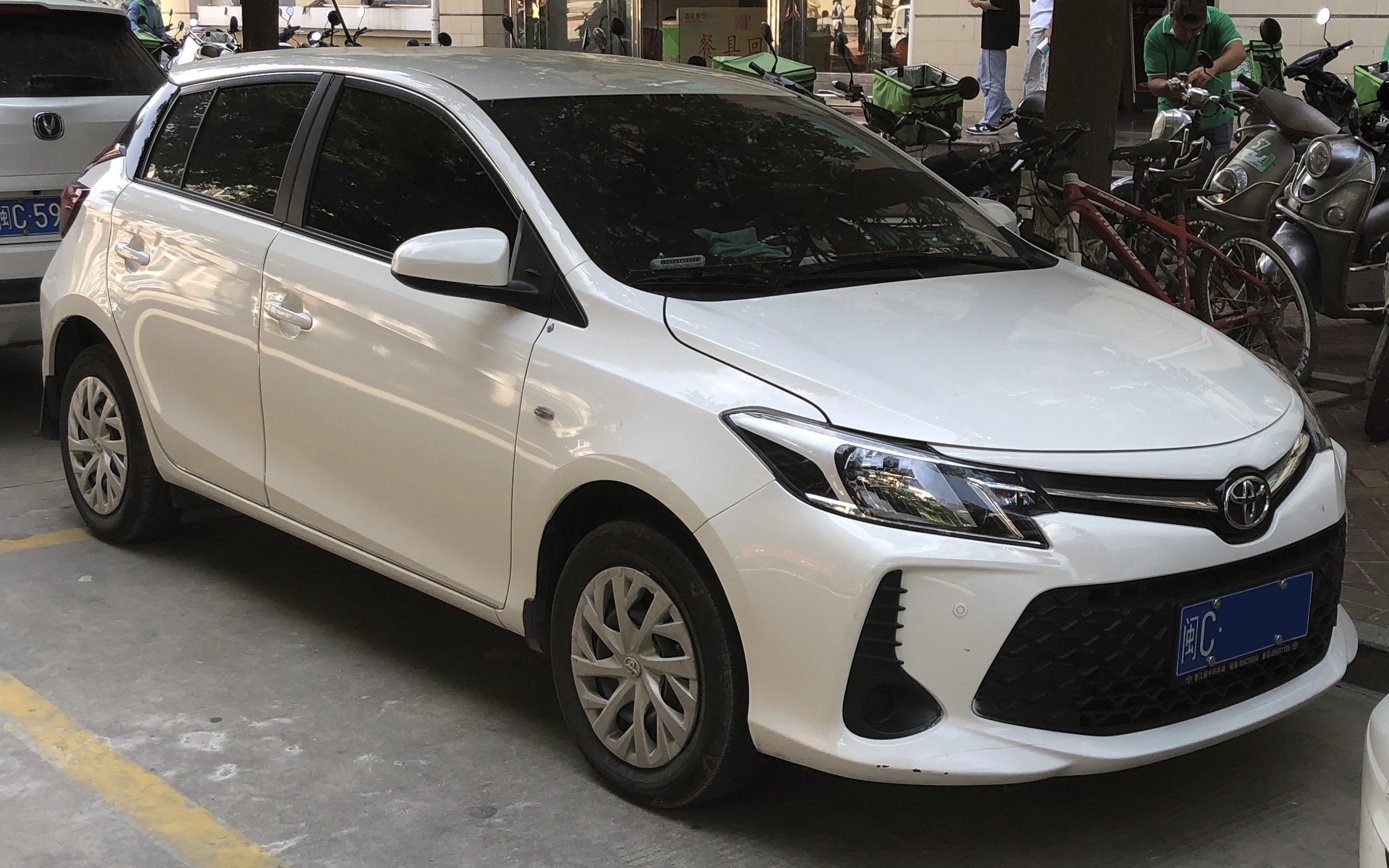
2020–2023
丰田威驰FS XP150
Toyota Vios FS XP150

==== SFTM Chengdu ====
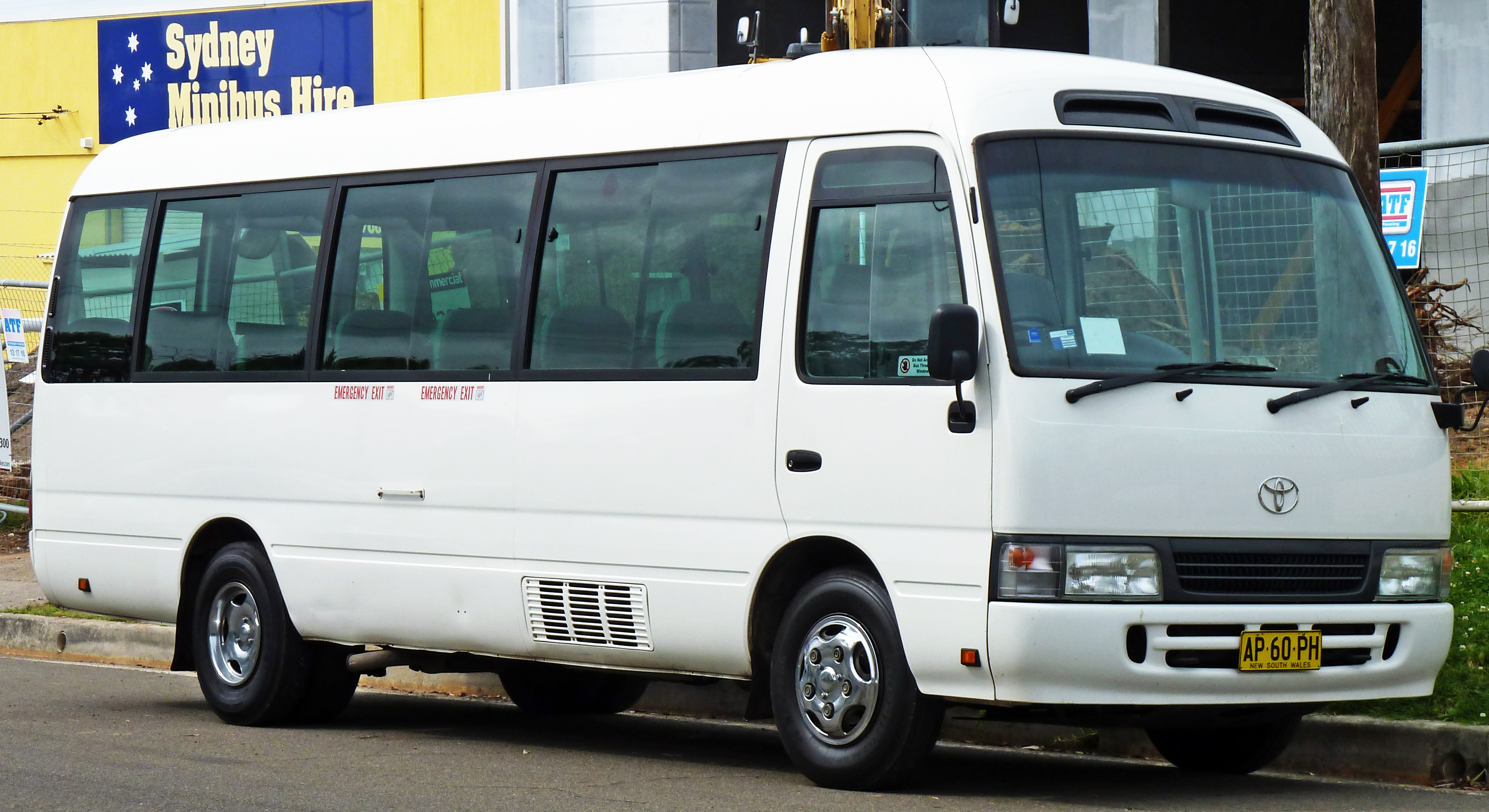
2000–2007
丰田柯斯达B50
Toyota Coaster B50

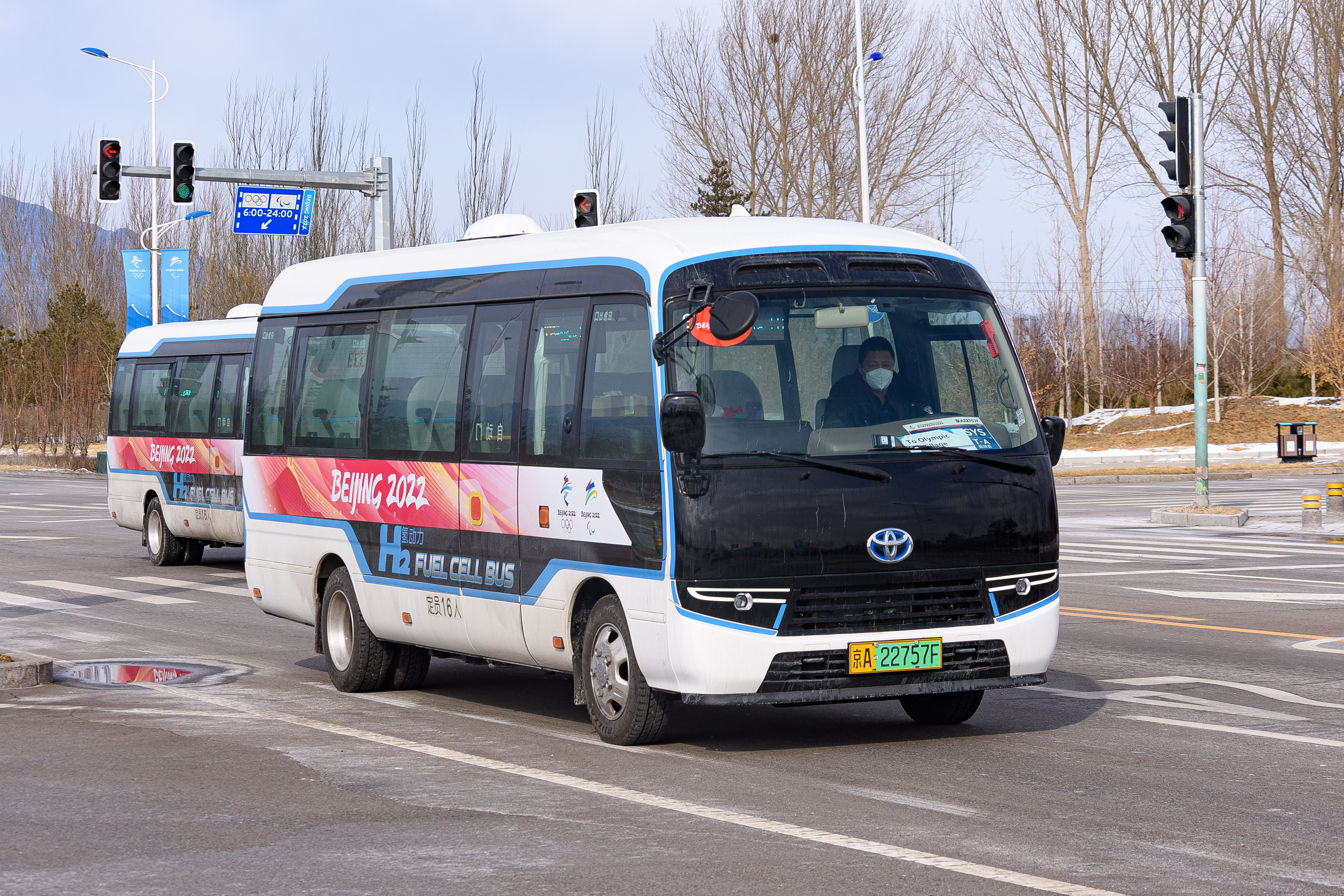
2021
丰田柯斯达氢擎B50
Toyota Coaster FCV B50

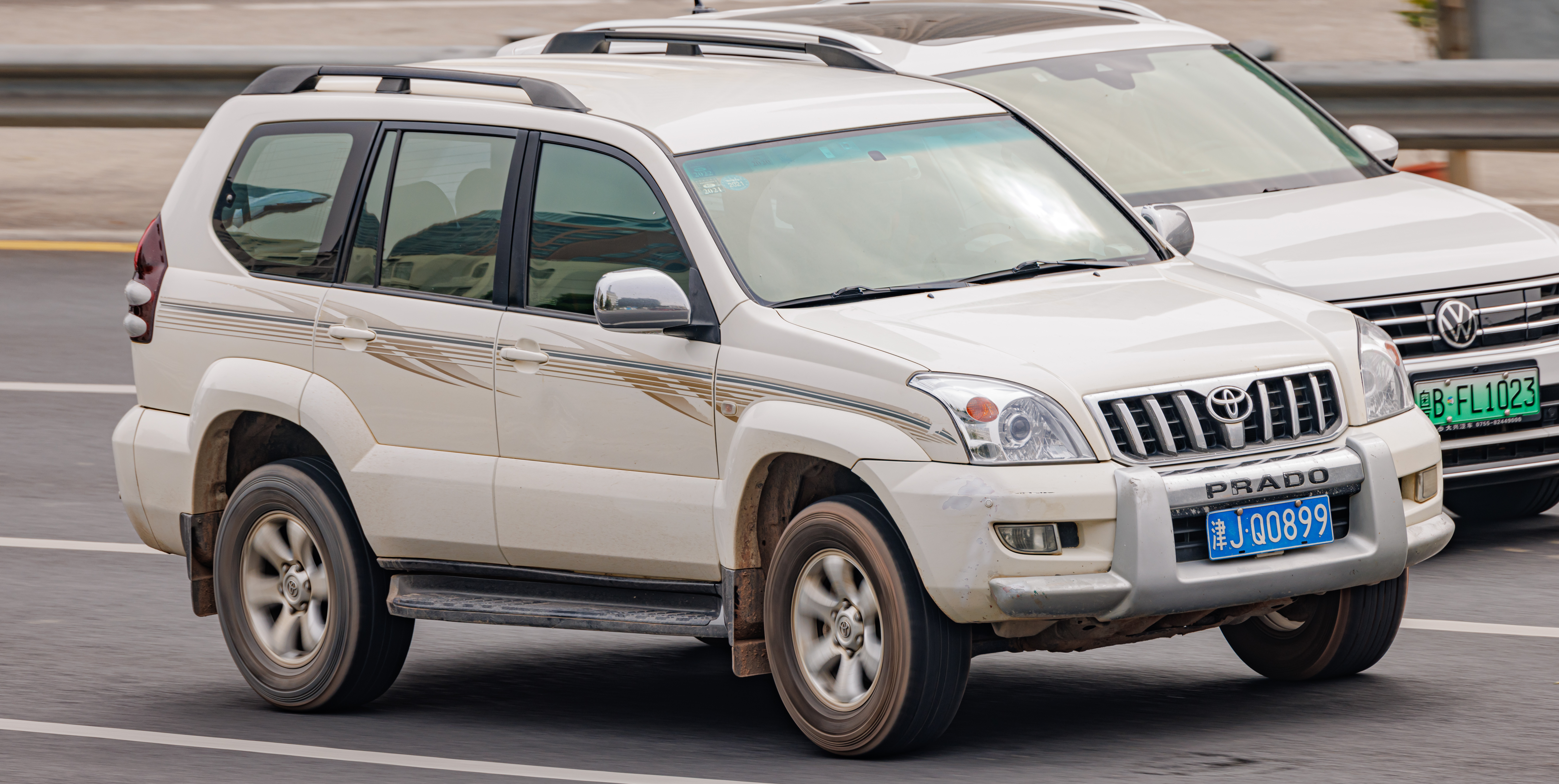
2003–2010
丰田霸道/普拉多J120
Toyota Land Cruiser Prado J120

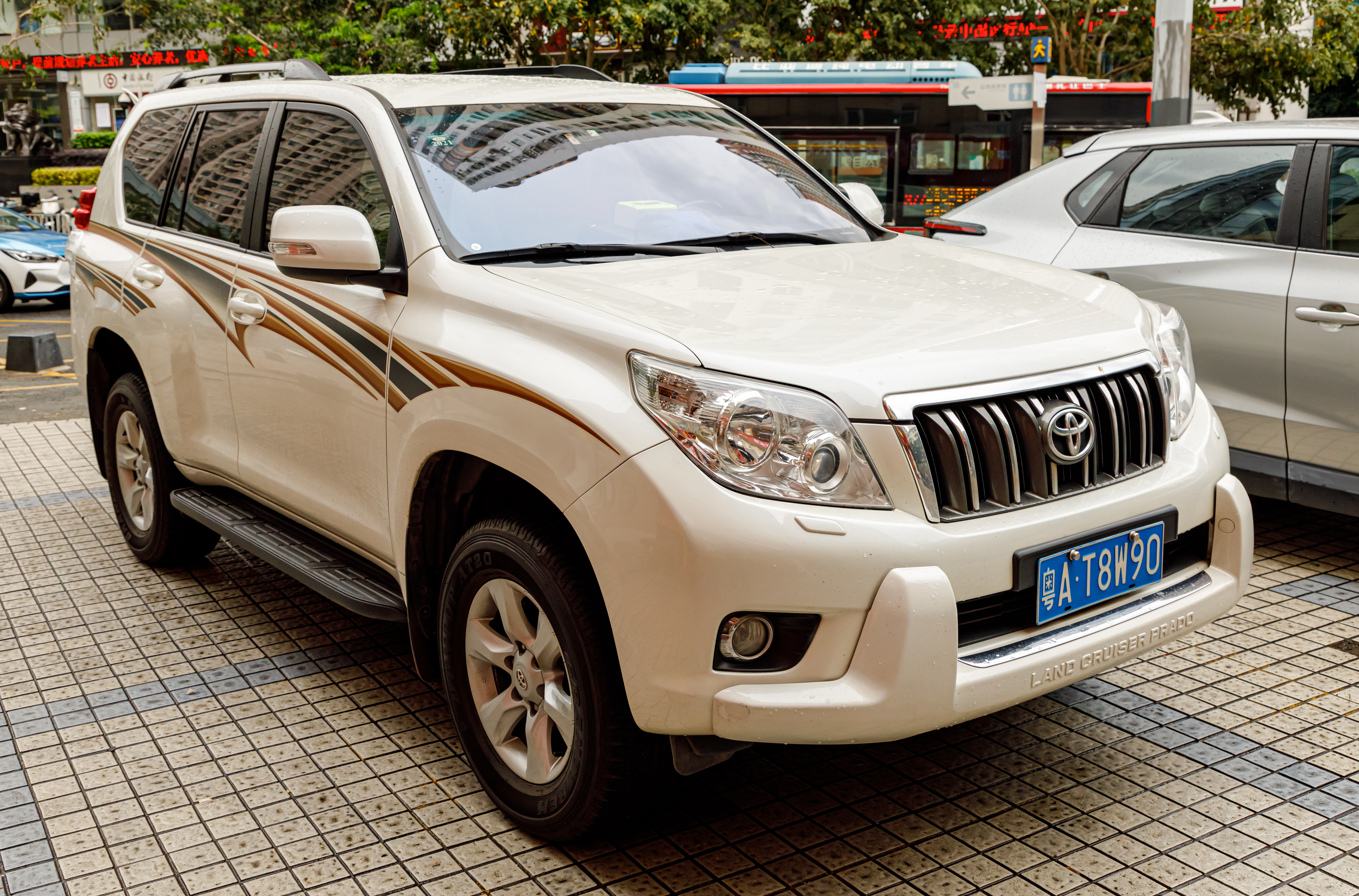
2010–2013
丰田普拉多J150
Toyota Land Cruiser Prado J150

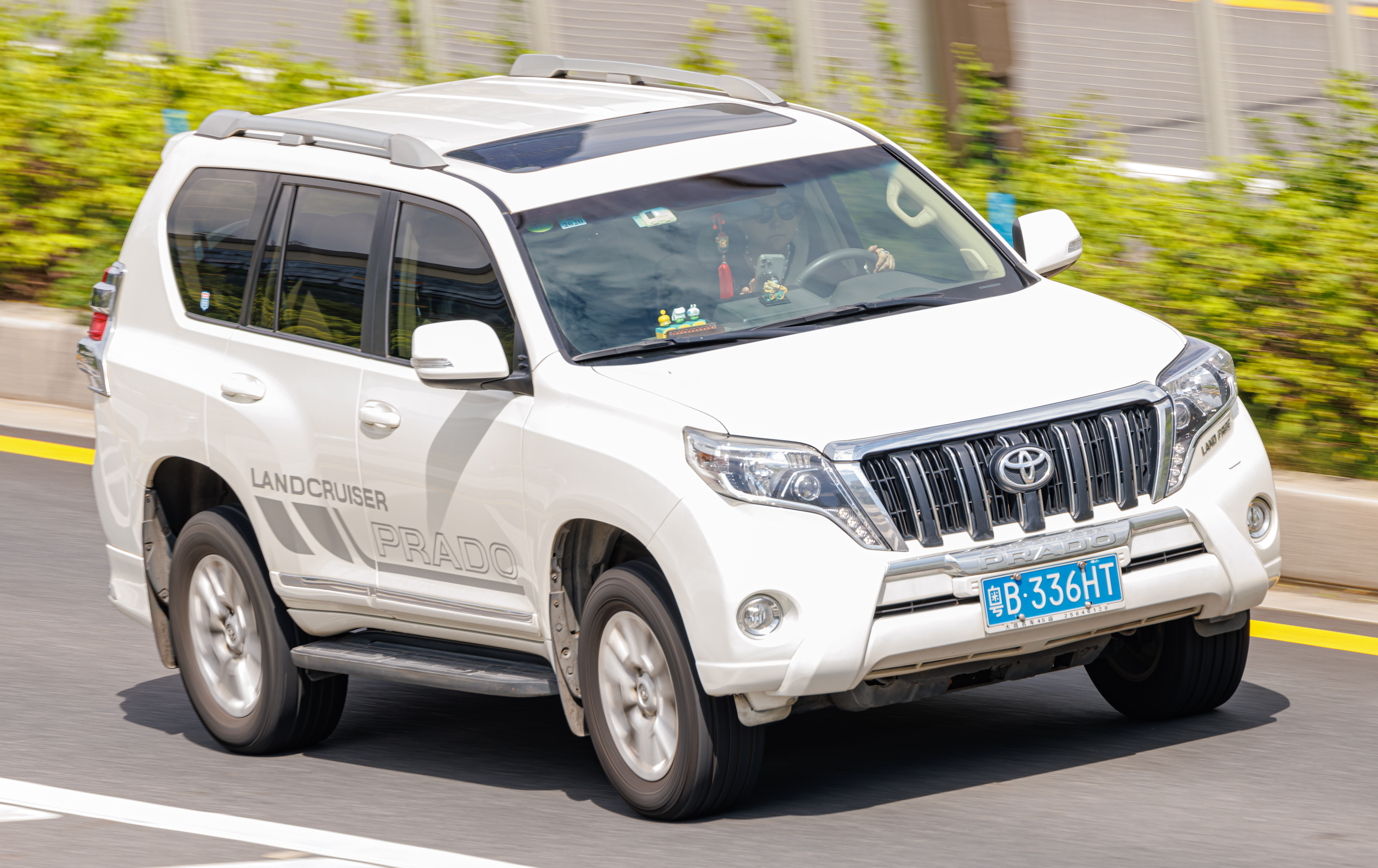
2013–2017
丰田普拉多J150
Toyota Land Cruiser Prado J150

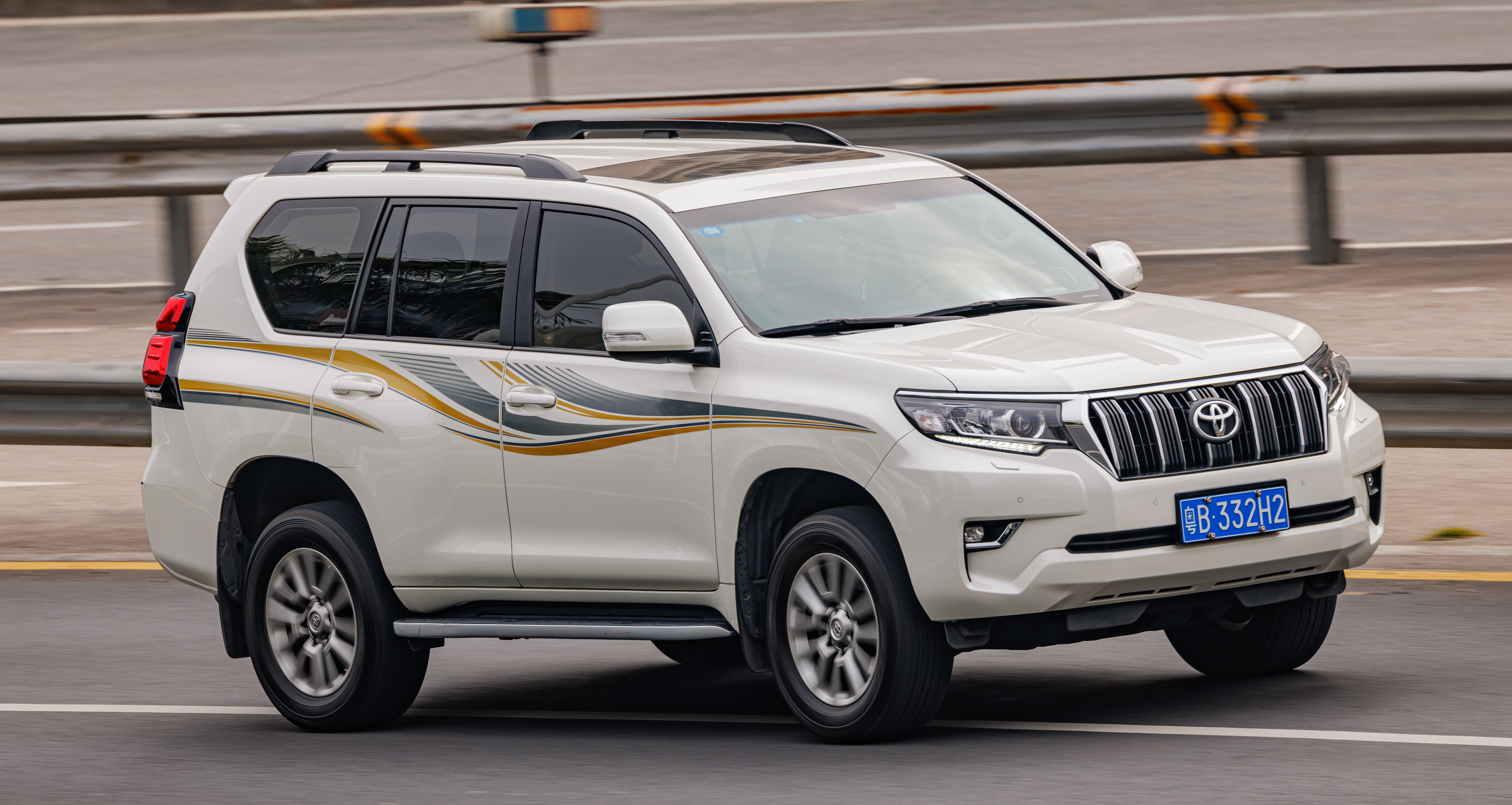
2018–2020
丰田普拉多J150
Toyota Land Cruiser Prado J150

==== SFTM Changchun ====
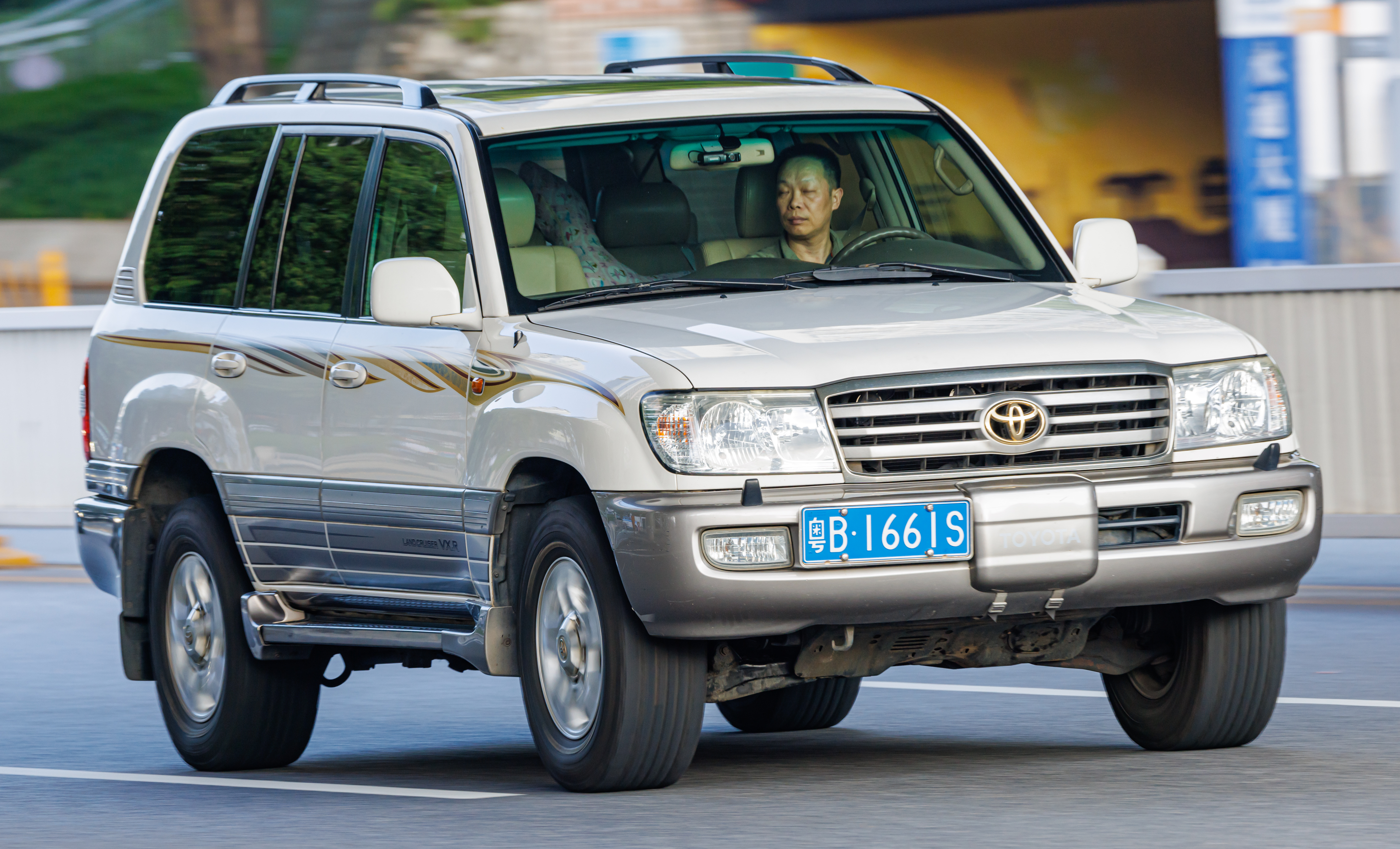
2003–2008
丰田陆地巡洋舰J100
Toyota Land Cruiser J100

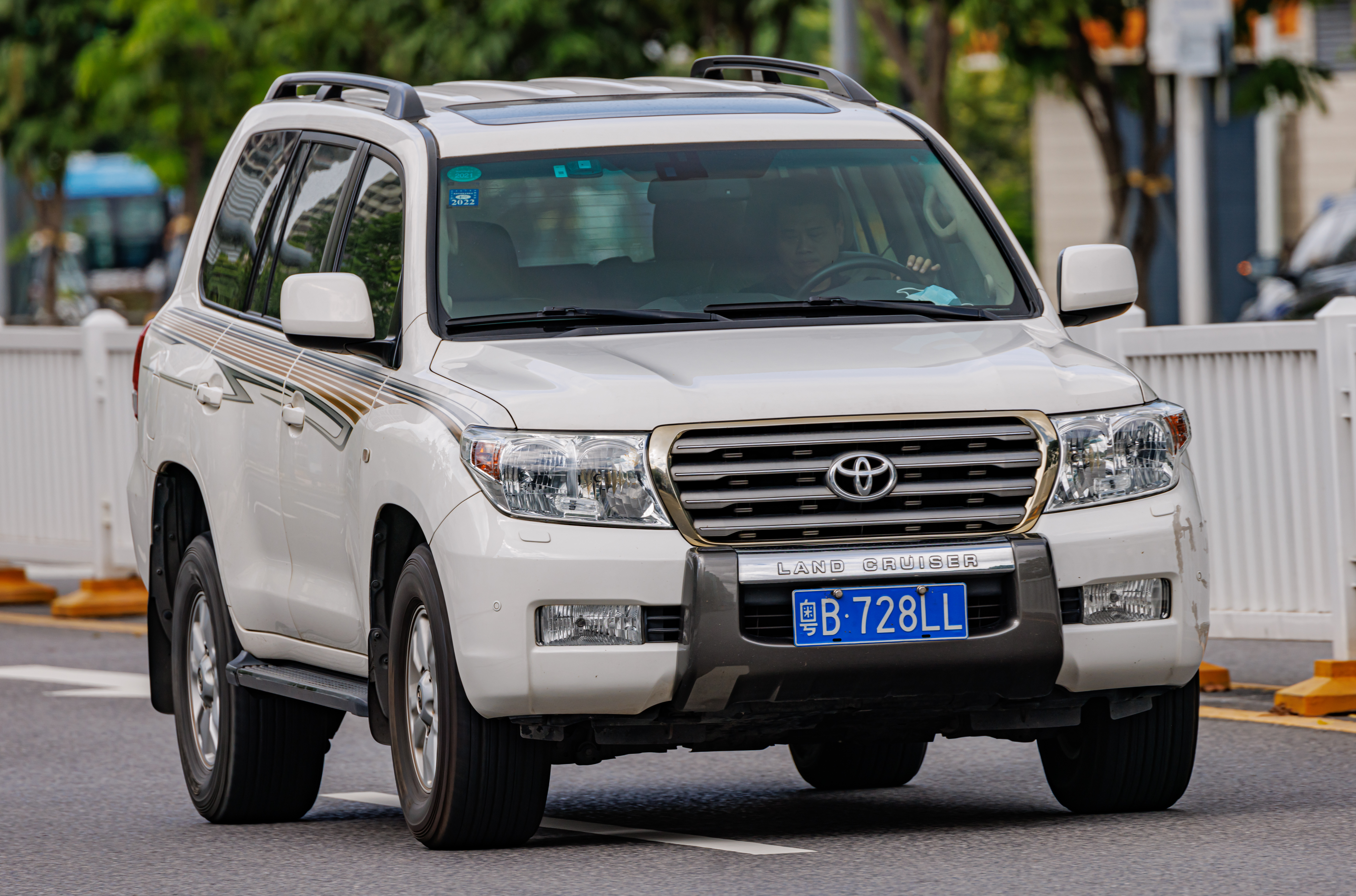
2008–2012
丰田兰德酷路泽J200
Toyota Land Cruiser J200

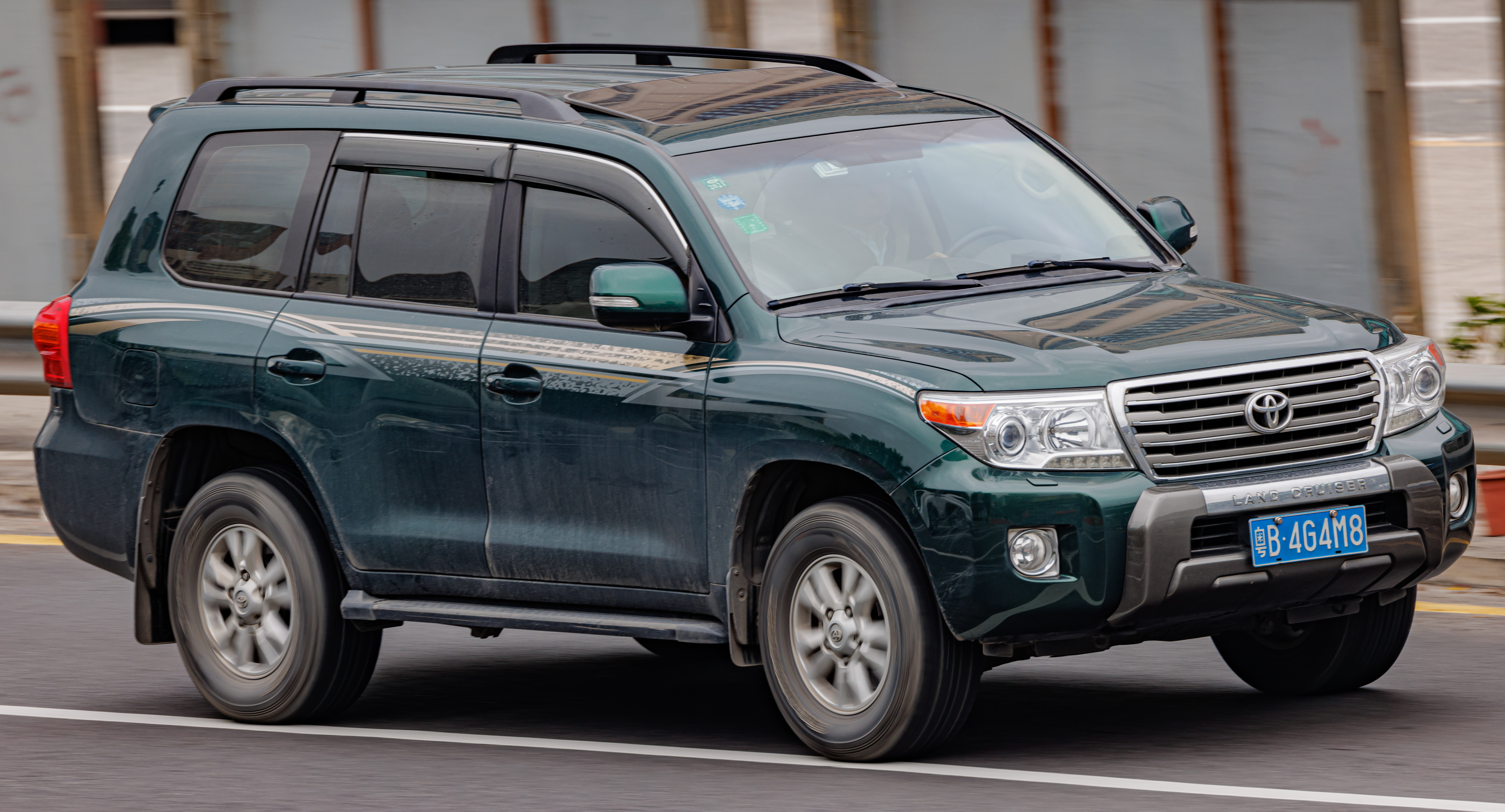
2012–2016
丰田兰德酷路泽J200
Toyota Land Cruiser J200

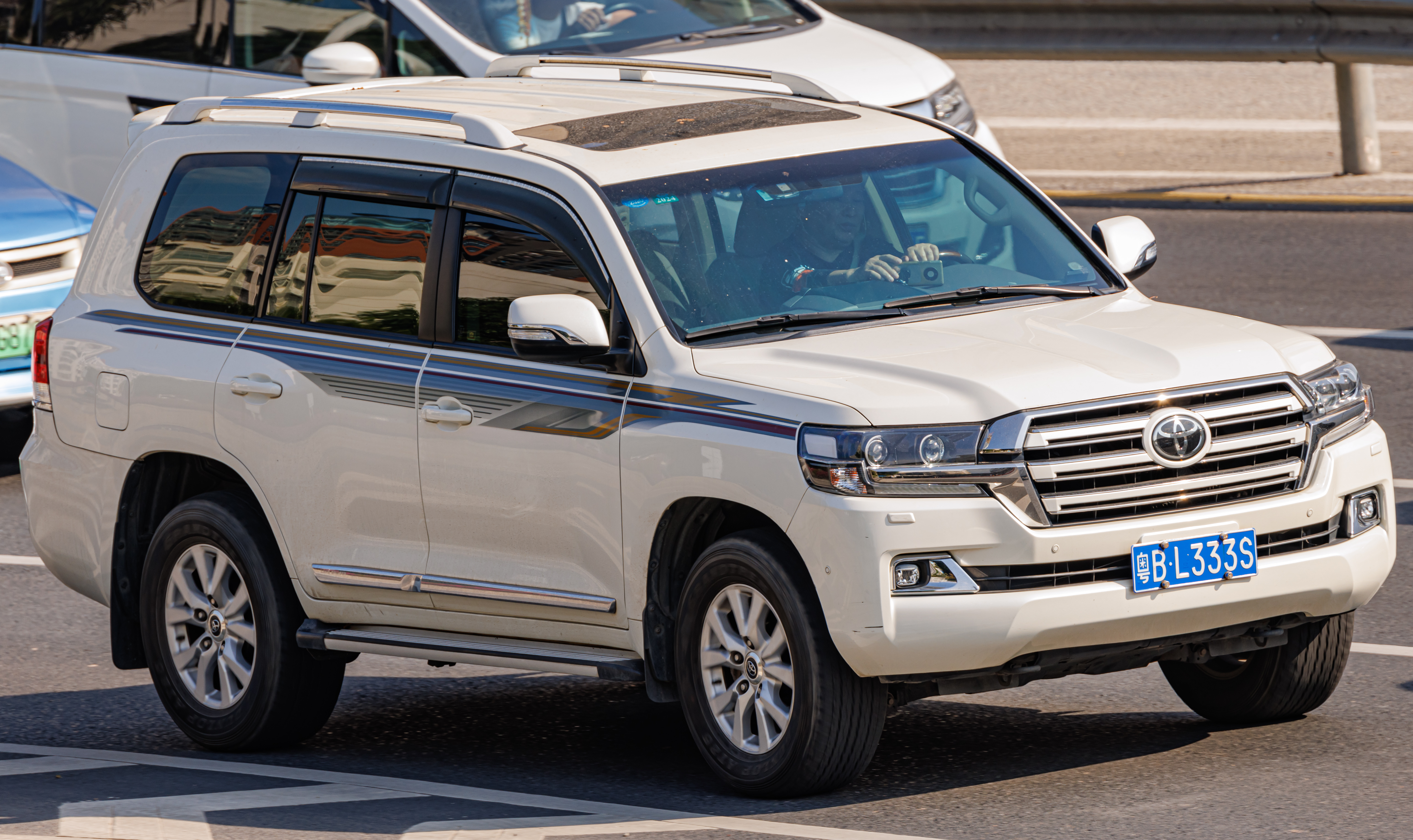
2016
丰田兰德酷路泽J200
Toyota Land Cruiser J200

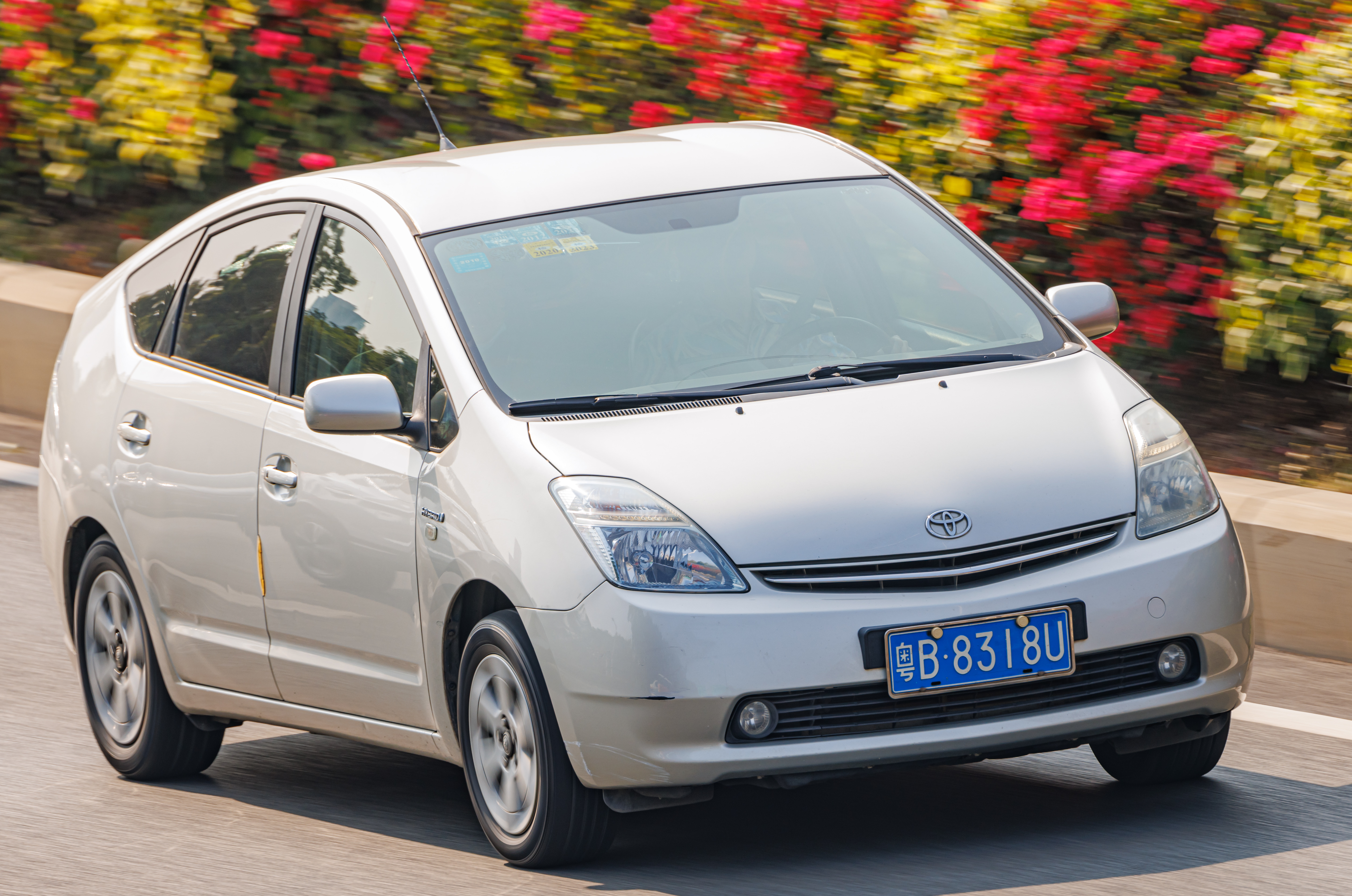
2005–2009
丰田普锐斯XW20
Toyota Prius XW20

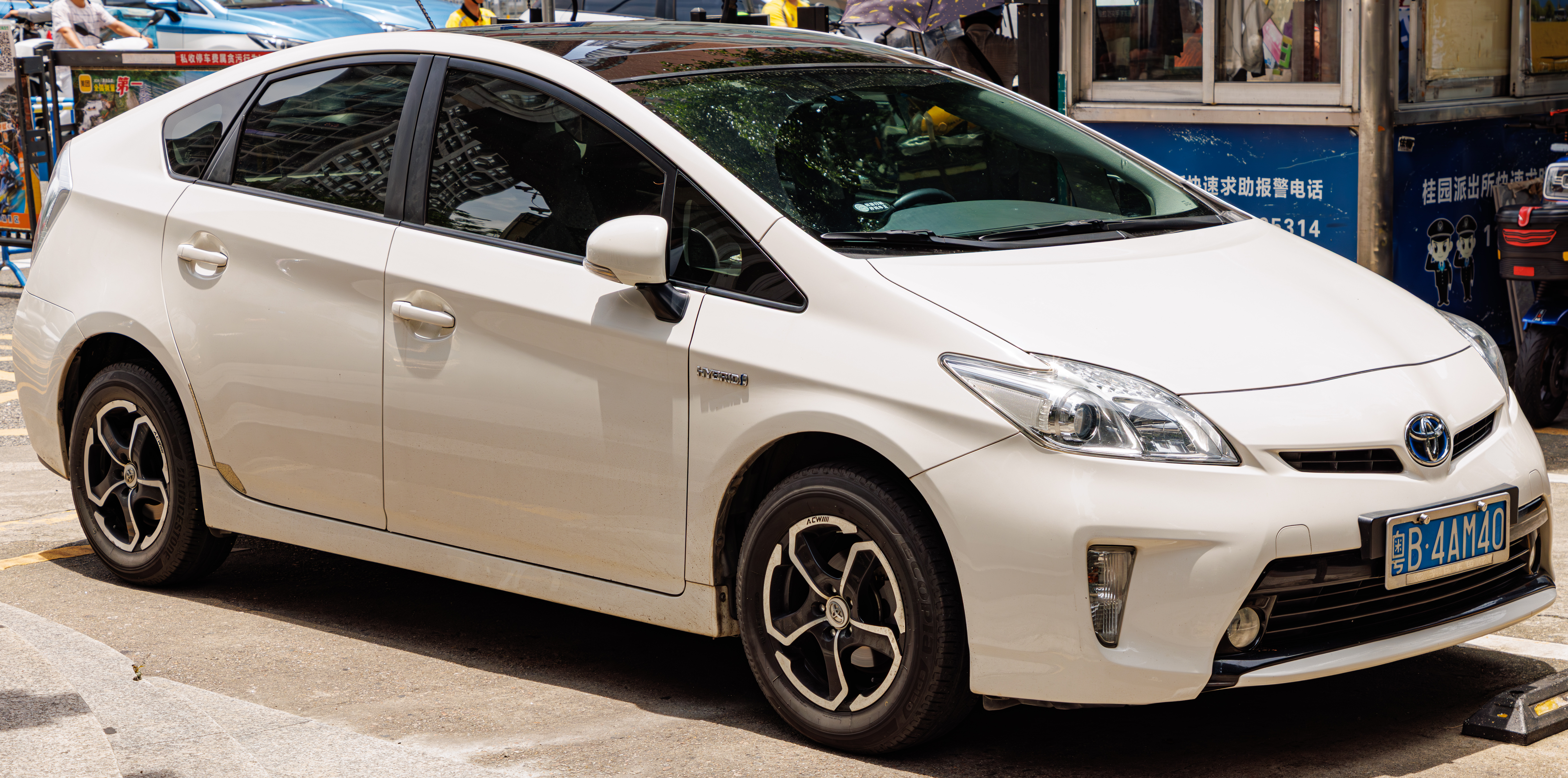
2011–2015
丰田普锐斯XW30
Toyota Prius XW30

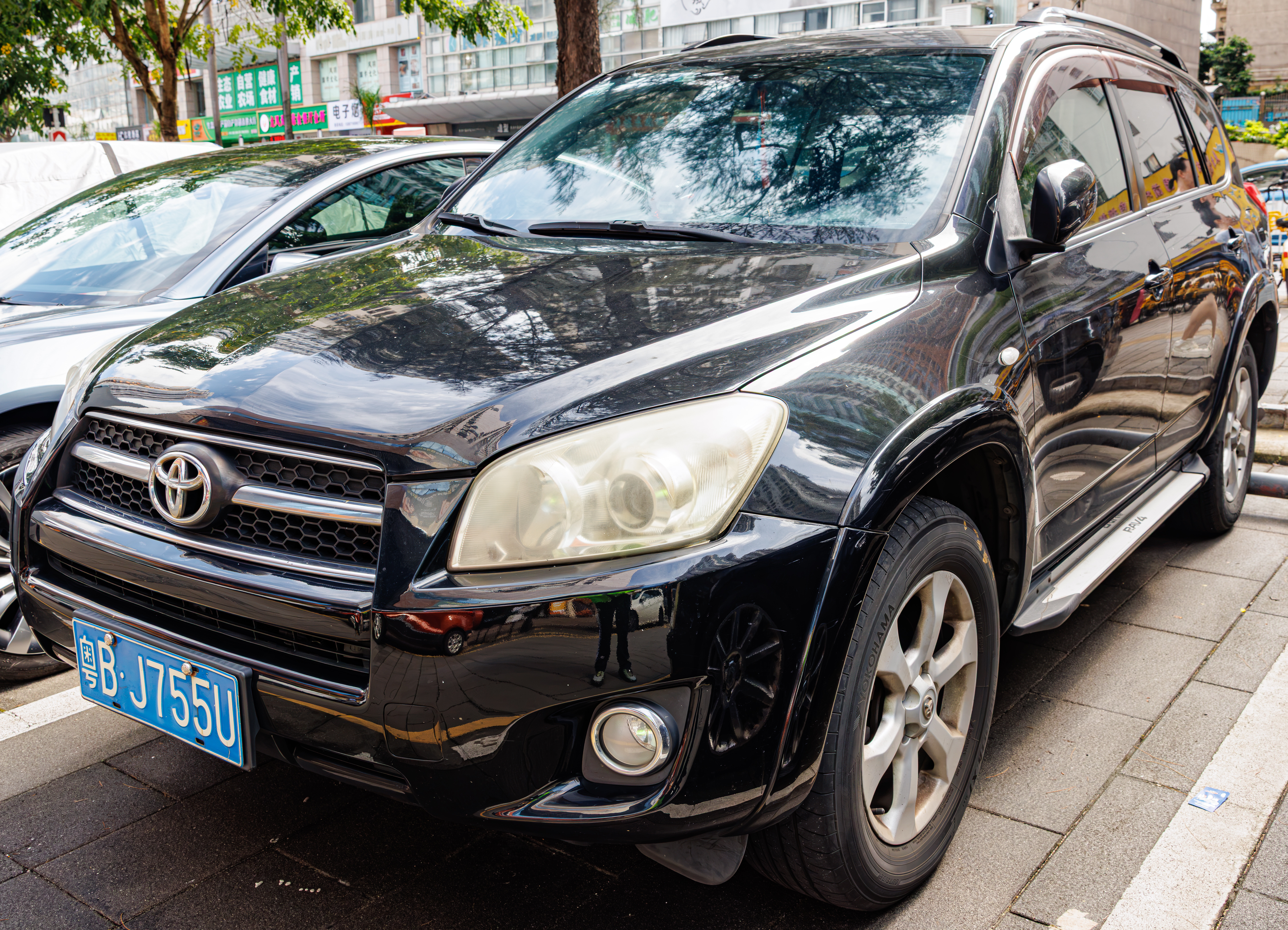
2009–2013
丰田RAV4 XA30
Toyota RAV4 XA30

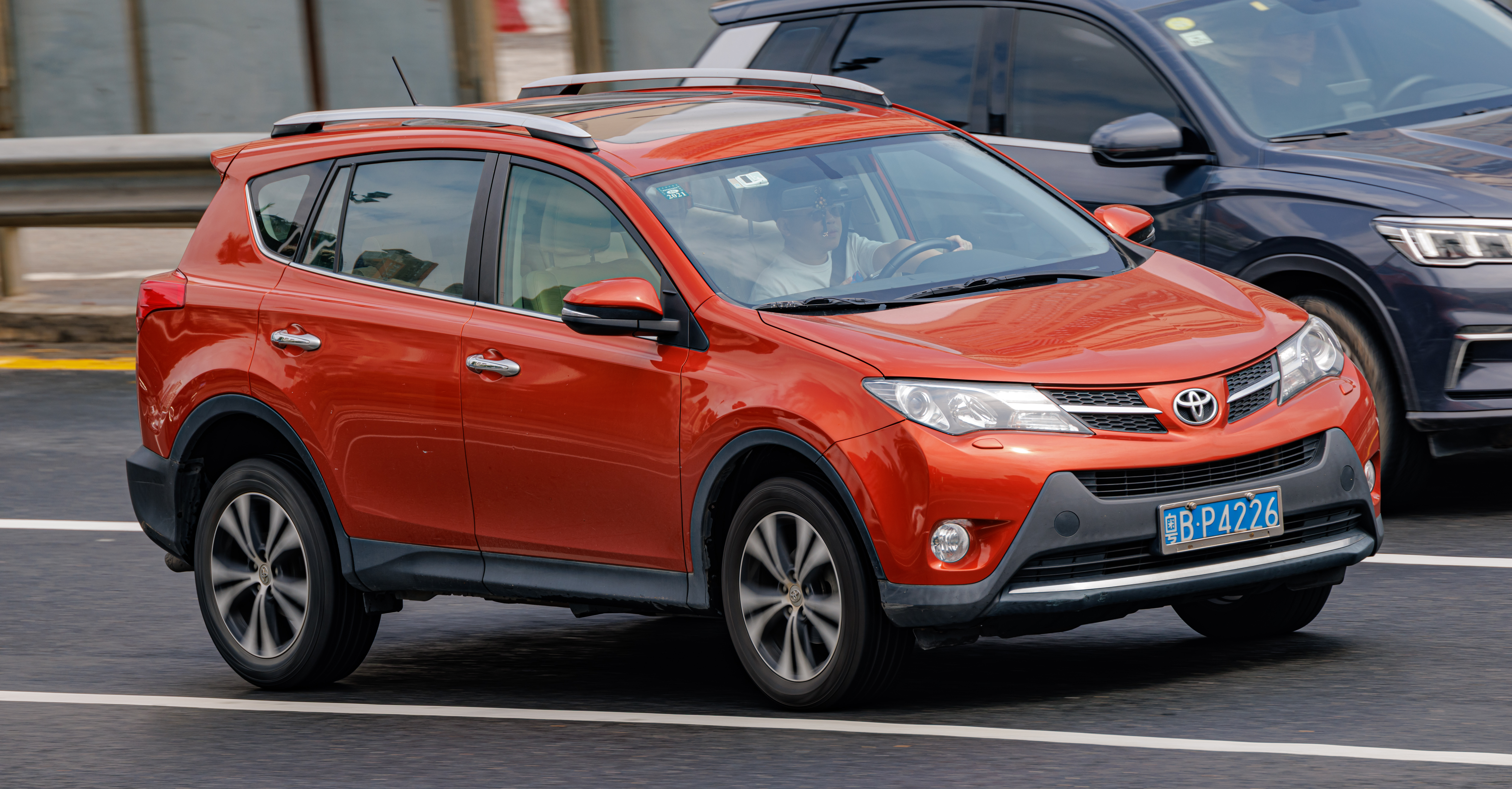
2013–2016
丰田RAV4 XA40
Toyota RAV4 XA40

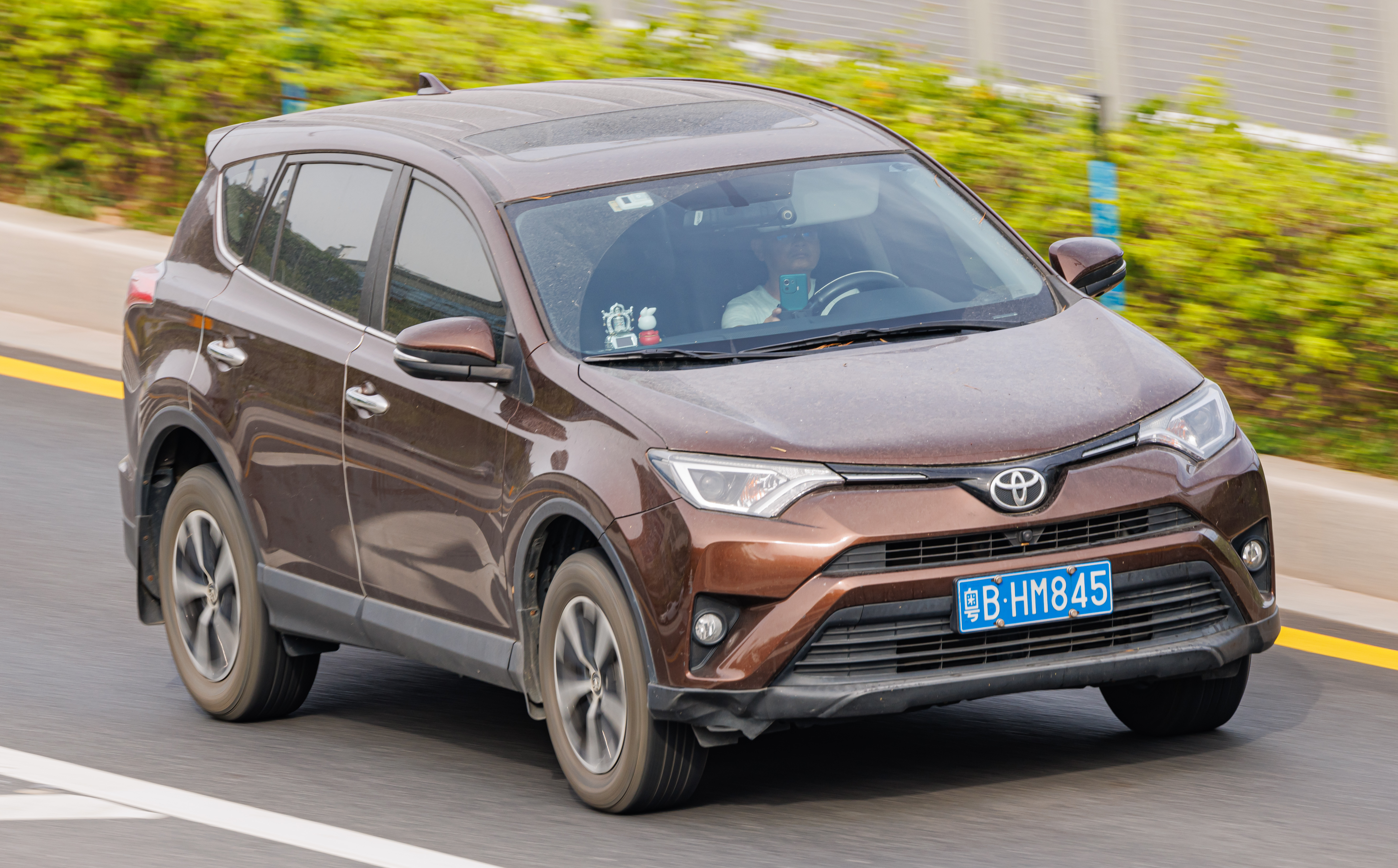
2016–2019
丰田RAV4荣放XA40
Toyota RAV4 XA40

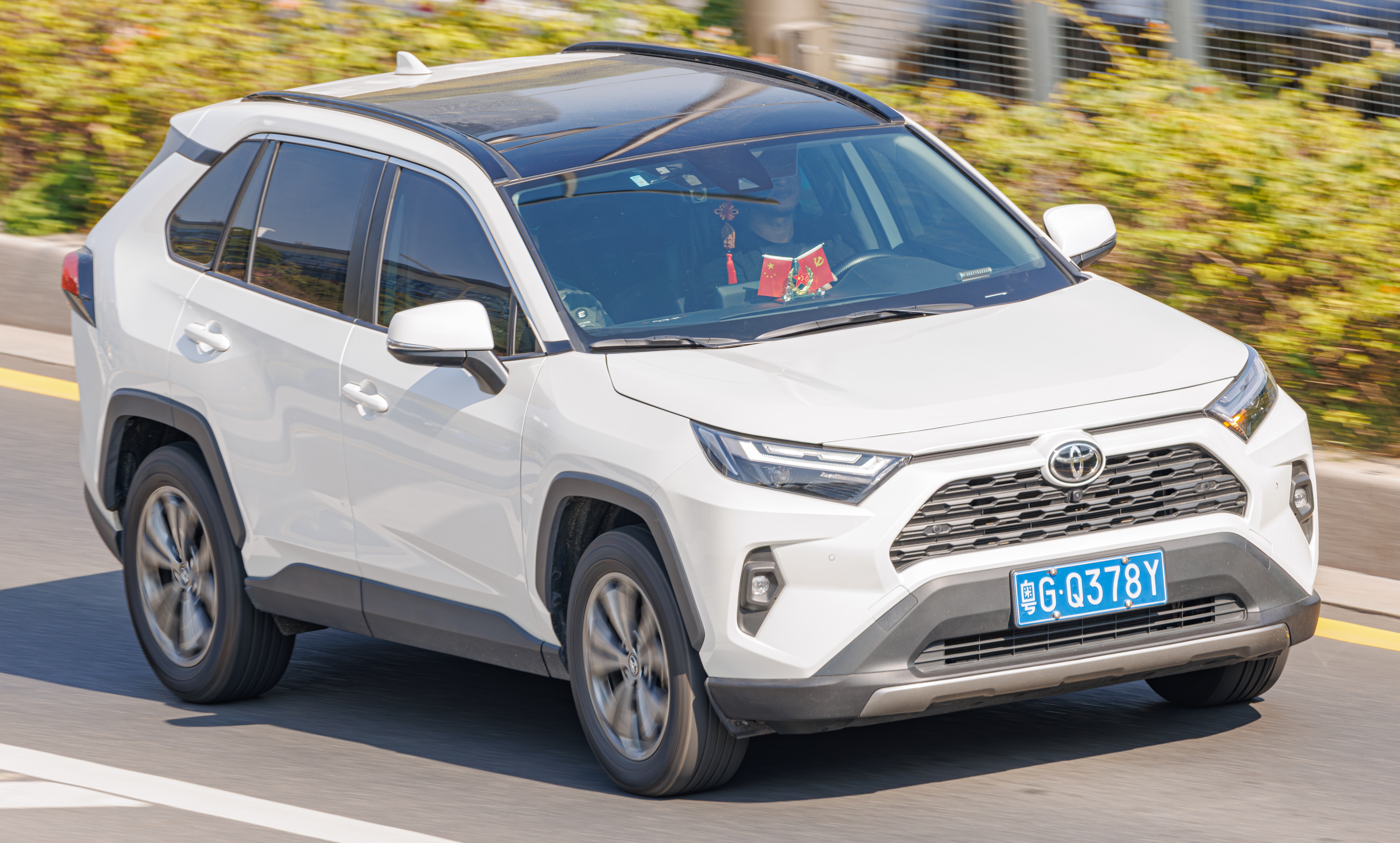
2019–2025
丰田RAV4荣放XA50
Toyota RAV4 XA50

=== Former imported models ===
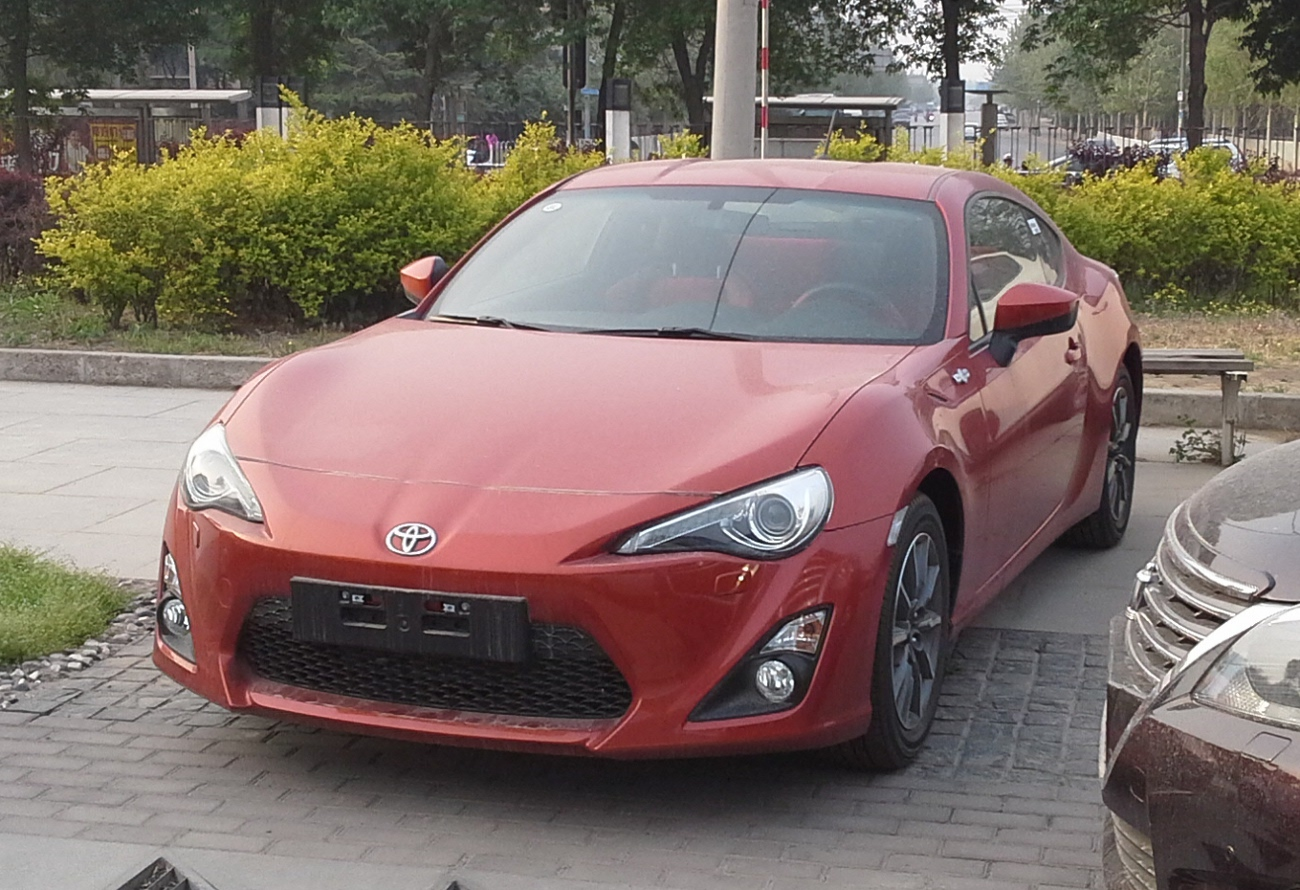
2013–2022
丰田86
Toyota 86

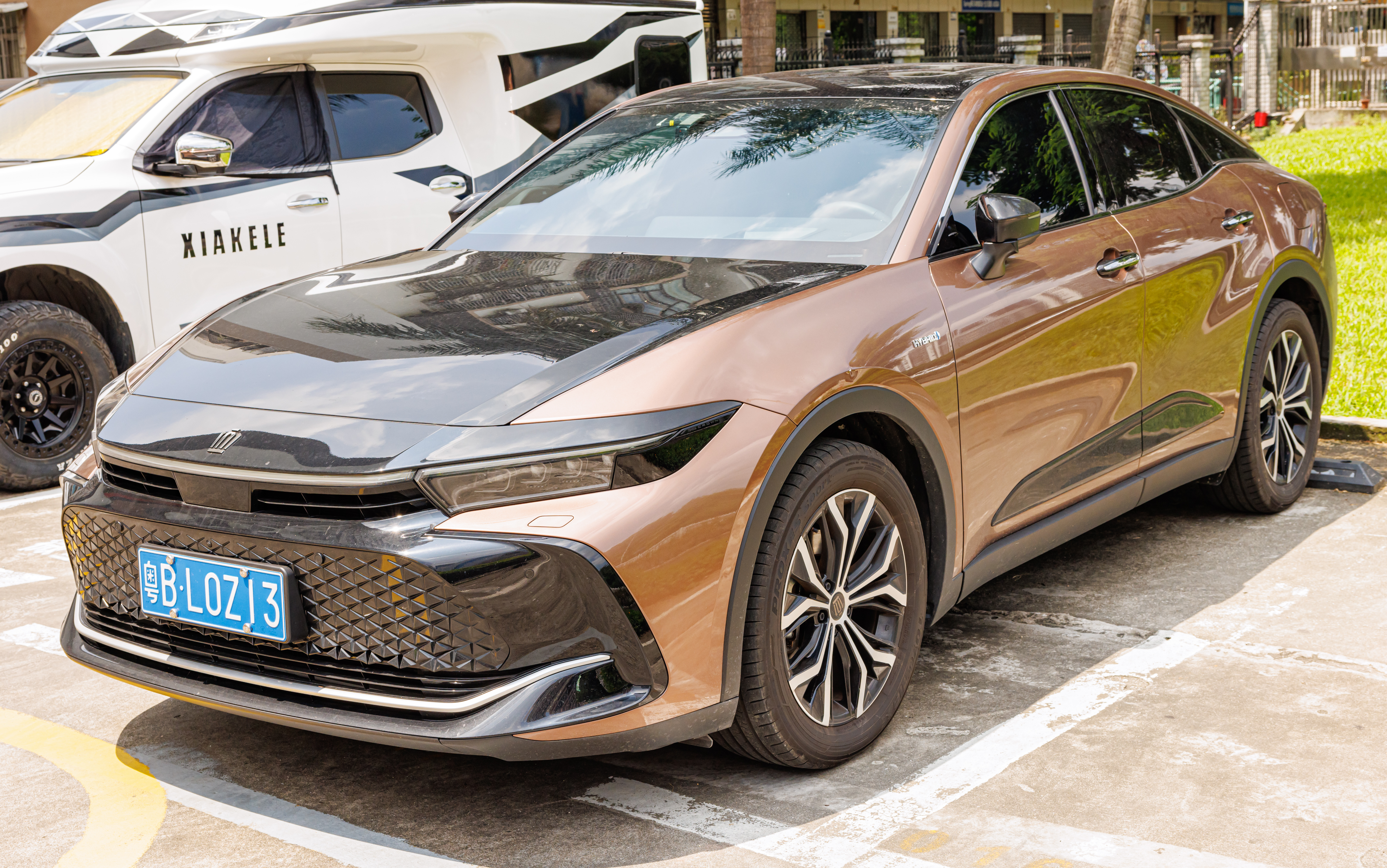
2022–2026
丰田皇冠SportCross S235
Toyota Crown SportCross S235

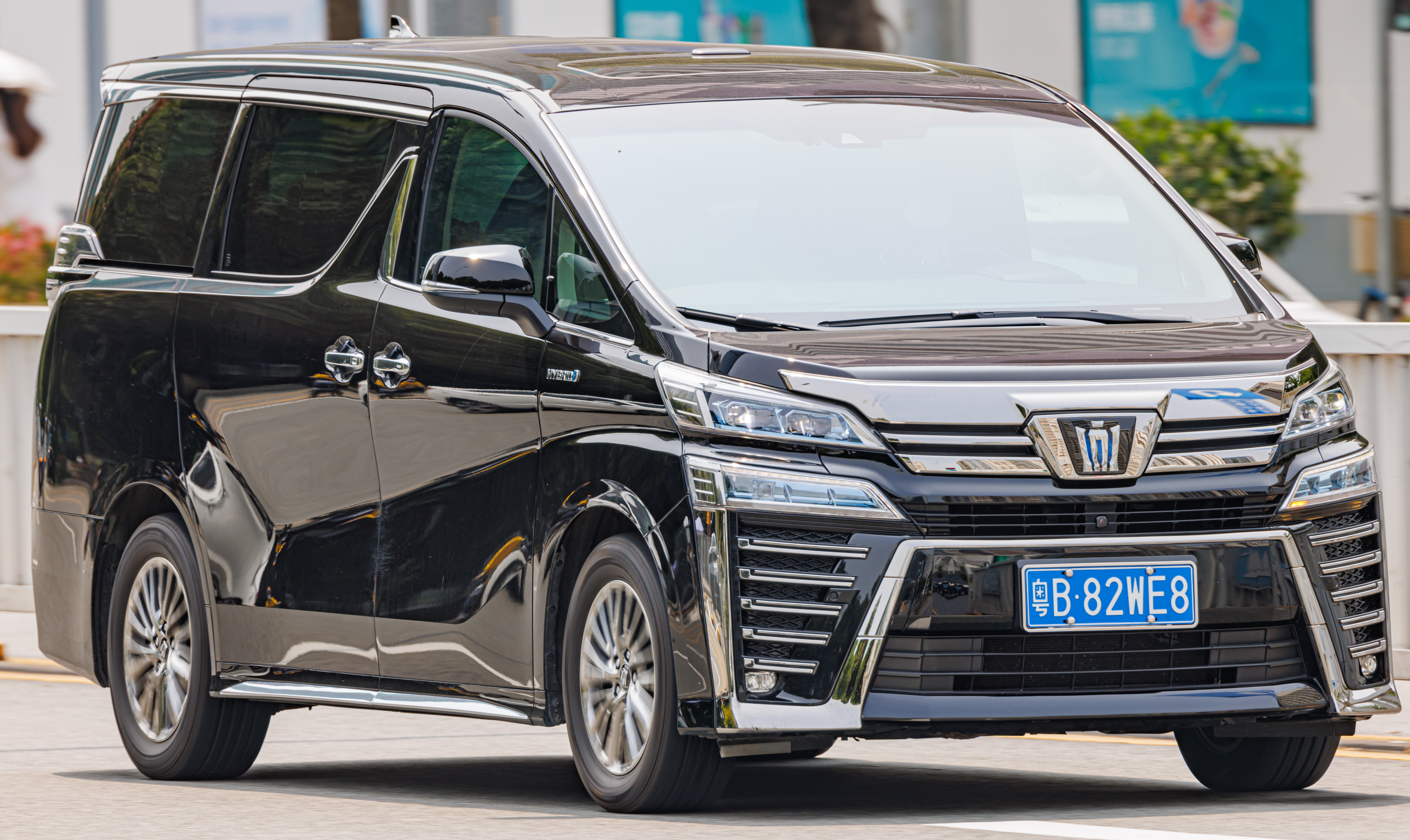
2021–2023
丰田皇冠威尔法AH30
Toyota Crown Vellfire AH30

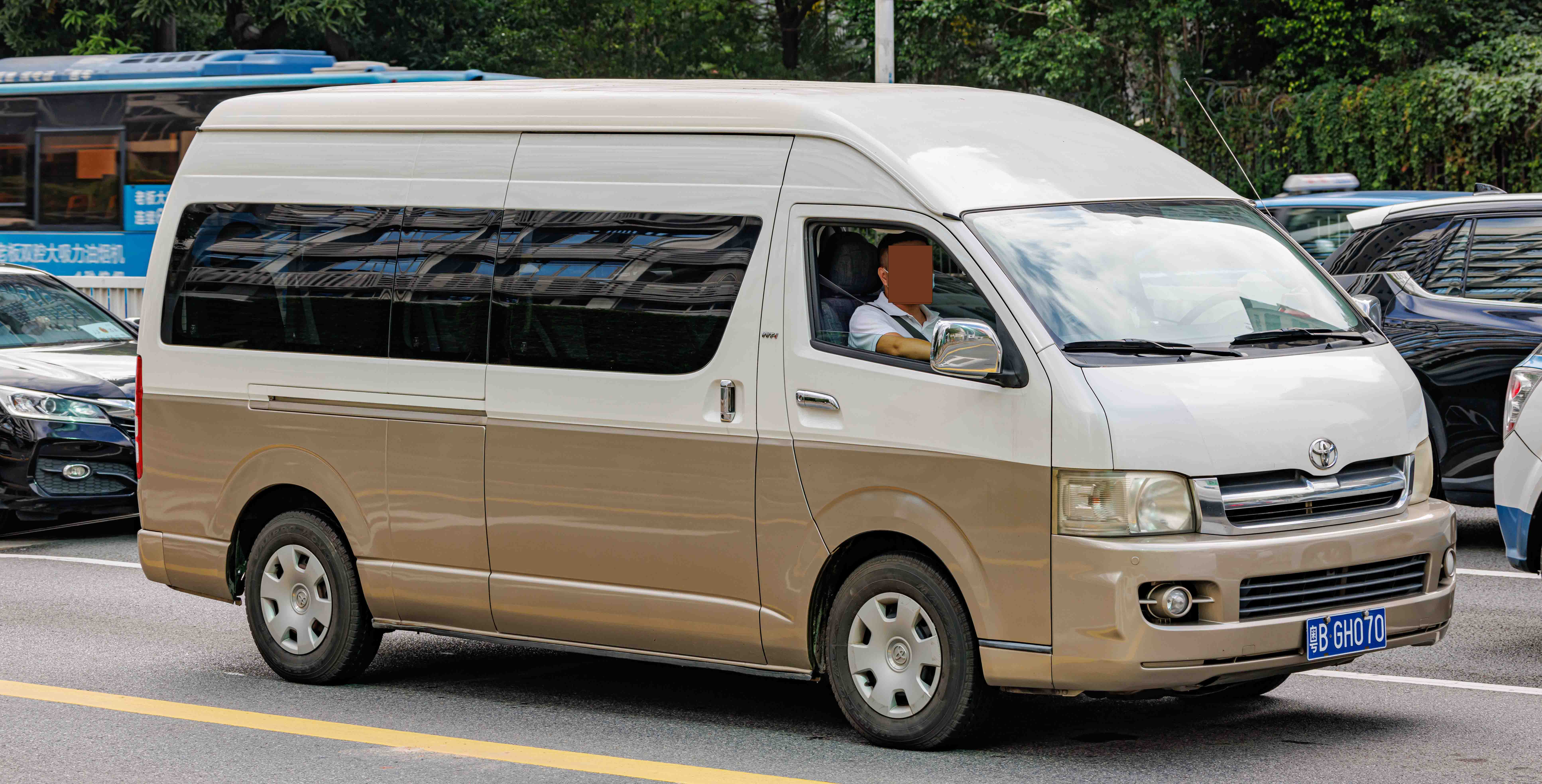
2011–2018
丰田海艾士H200
Toyota Hiace H200

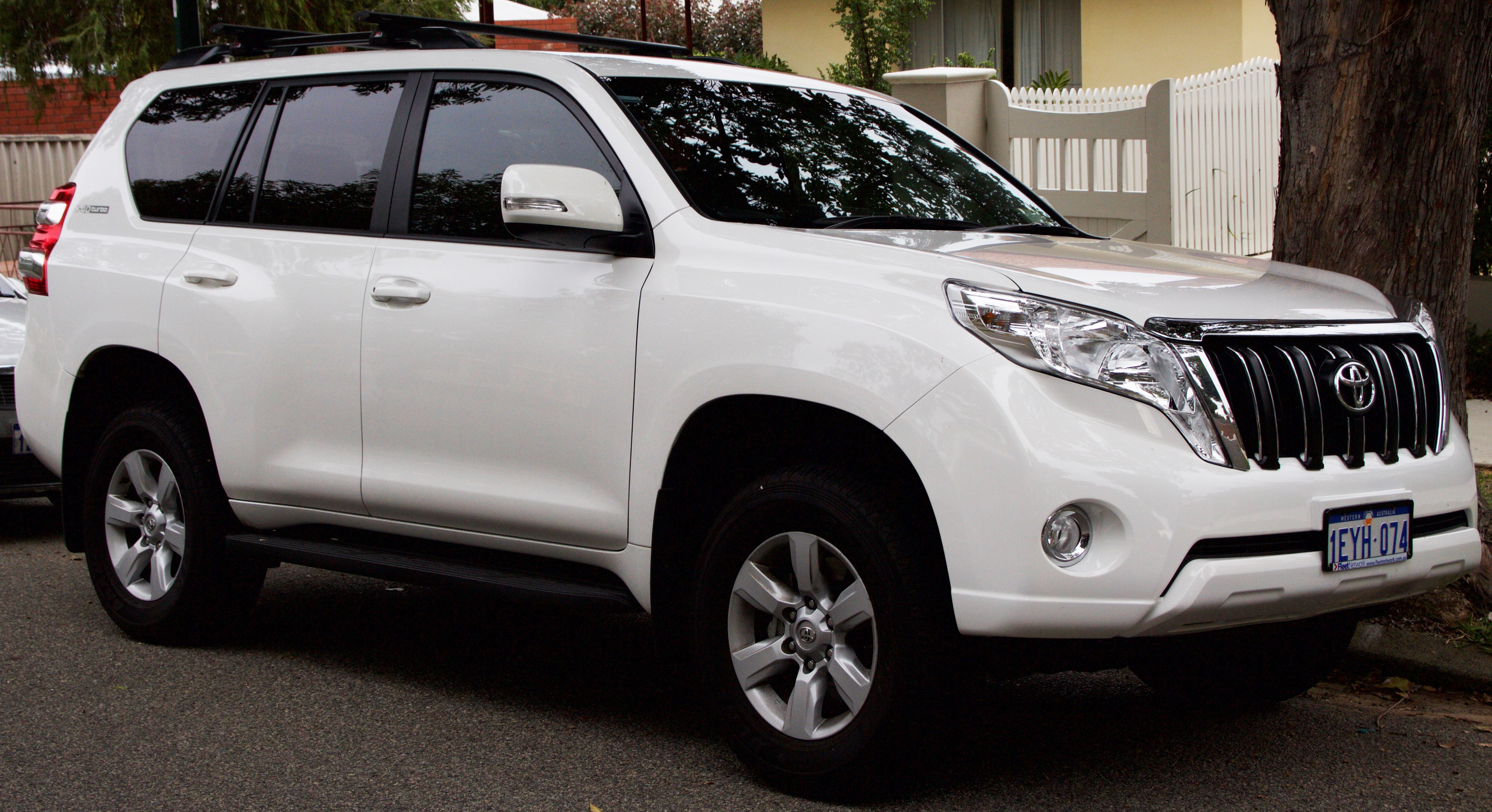
2010–2014
丰田普拉多J150 2.7L (进口)
Toyota Land Cruiser Prado J150 2.7L (imported)

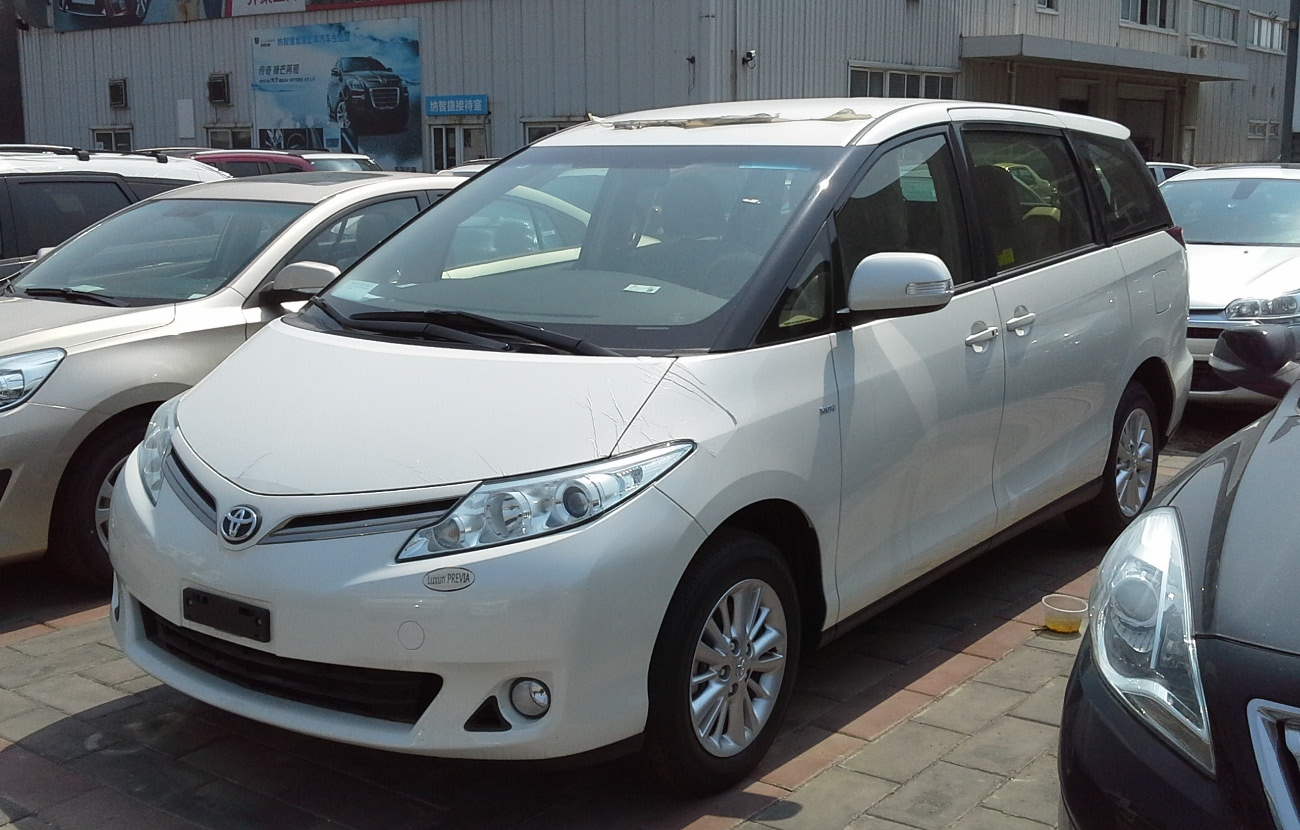
2010–2018
丰田普瑞维亚XR50
Toyota Previa XR50

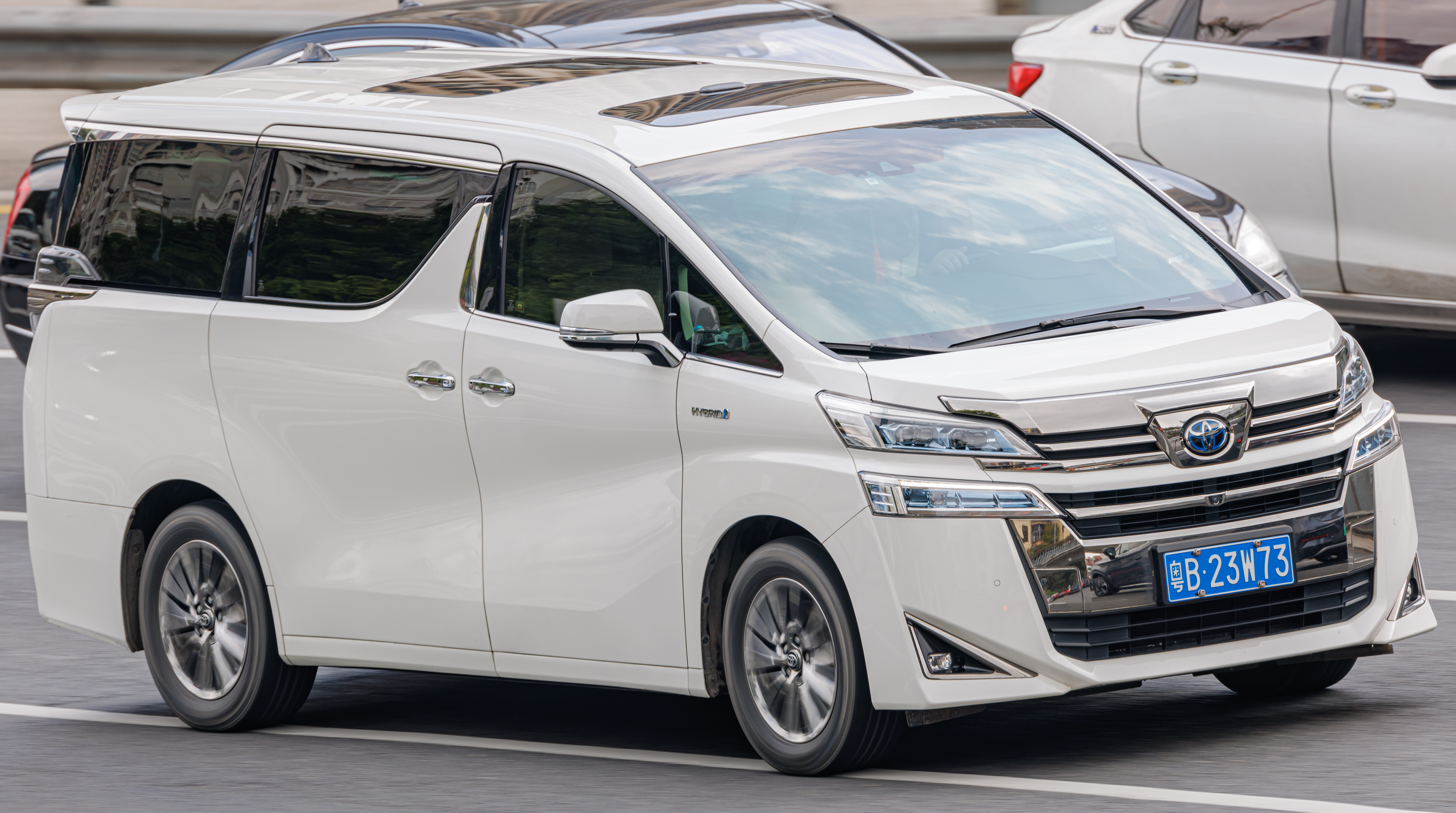
2019–2021
丰田威尔法双擎AH30
Toyota Vellfire Hybrid AH30

== See also ==
- FAW Group
- Toyota Motor China
- GAC Toyota
