= Sustainable Experience Architecture =

Sustainable Experience Architecture (SEA)
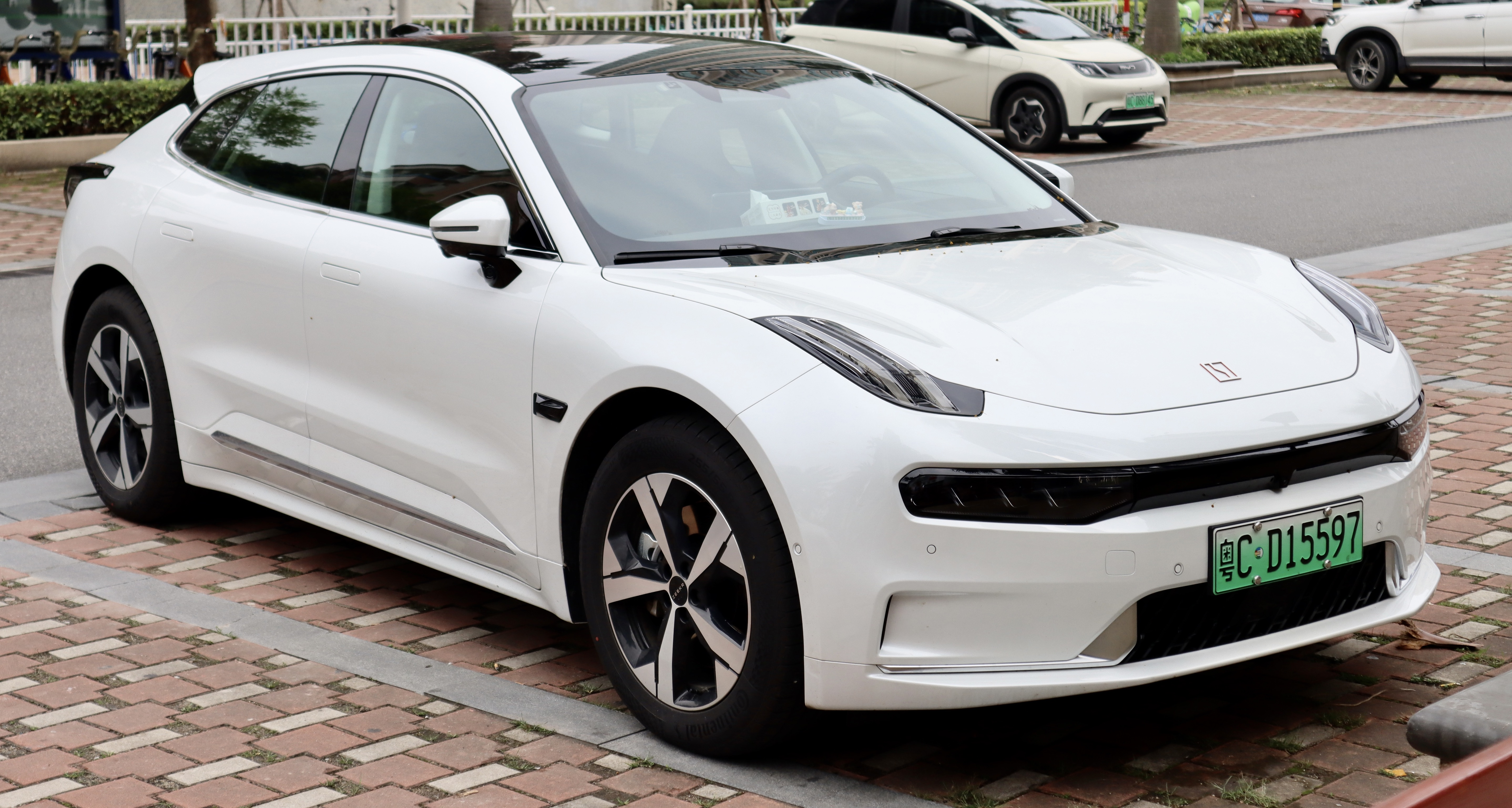
- Zeekr 001, the first vehicle to use the Sustainable Experience Architecture platform

Overview
- Manufacturer: Geely Holding
- Production: 2021–present

Body and chassis
- Layout: Front motor, front-wheel drive (Zeekr 009); Rear motor, rear-wheel drive; Dual/triple motor, all-wheel-drive

The Sustainable Experience Architecture (SEA; Chinese: 浩瀚; pinyin: Hàohàn) platform is a modular electric vehicle platform developed by Zeekr Technology Europe (previously China Euro Vehicle Technology), a company based in Gothenburg, Sweden within Geely Automobile Holdings group of companies. The platform is used in Geely Holding portfolio brands along with the Smart joint venture with Mercedes-Benz Group.

Geely refers the SEA platform as "open-source," meaning the manufacturer is open to supply the platform to other automakers. Geely Holding has claimed it has entered into preliminary discussions with other manufacturers about potential use of the SEA platform.

== Overview ==
The SEA platform is more of an architecture that unifies multiple platforms covering almost all vehicle types. The platform consists of several different core versions covering a variety of market segments with different marketing names:

- SEA1 (previously PMA1, the Pure electric Modular Architecture) for E-segment executive cars with wheelbase of 3,000 mm to 3,019 mm.
- SEA2 (previously PMA2) for D-segment compact executive cars with wheelbase of 2,900 mm.
- SEA3 (or PMA2+) for enhanced intelligent hardware platform targeting at support for urban navigation-assisted driving systems
- SEA-E (SEA Entry) for C-segment compact cars with wheelbase of 2,750 mm.
- SEA-S (previously EPA for Electric Premium Architecture) for S sports cars
- SEA-R for high-end full-size PHEV models.
- SEA–MAP for 1 and 2 tonnes pickup trucks.
- SEA-M for autonomous electric vehicles.
- SEA-C (SEA Commercial) for commercial vehicles between 3.5 and 5.5 tonnes, including trucks, vans, and buses.
- SOA (Space Oriented Architecture)
- GBRC (Global Battery Rapid Change), variant of SEA platform, for battery swappable rear-motor, rear-wheel-drive or front-engine, rear-motor hybrid vehicle.

Each core platform will further be available in several different variants such as front, rear, and all-wheel drive, as well as single, double, and triple motor configurations. Performance is expected to be competitive, with support for both 400V and 800V architectures, fast charging, and 0-60 acceleration times as low as three seconds.

The predecessor of SEA platform is Geely's pure electric vehicle platform PMA. According to Geely's plan for the SEA architecture, the PMA platform was split into two variants in the later phase with the PMA1, now renamed SEA1, used in medium and large vehicles such as the Zeekr 001, and PMA2, now renamed SEA2, used in small and compact vehicles such as Smart #1.

The first model based on the SEA architecture is the Zeekr 001, unveiled on 23 September 2019 as the Lynk & Co Zero Concept, and is being launched in 2021.

SEA OS is the software component of the SEA platform.

On 5 September 2021, Geely and Mercedes-Benz Group announced the Smart Concept #1 based on SEA, and due in 2022.

Jidu Auto, a joint venture between Geely and Baidu, intends to use SEA for a full portfolio of vehicles in different segments, starting in 2022.

== Vehicles ==
=== SEA1/PMA1 ===
- Ji Yue 01 (2023–2024)
- Ji Yue 07 (2024)
- Lynk & Co Z10 / 10 EV (E371) (2024–present)
- Volvo EM90 (2024–present)
- Zeekr 001 (DC1E) (2021–present)
- Polestar 4 (2023–present)
- Zeekr 009 (EF1E) (2022–present)
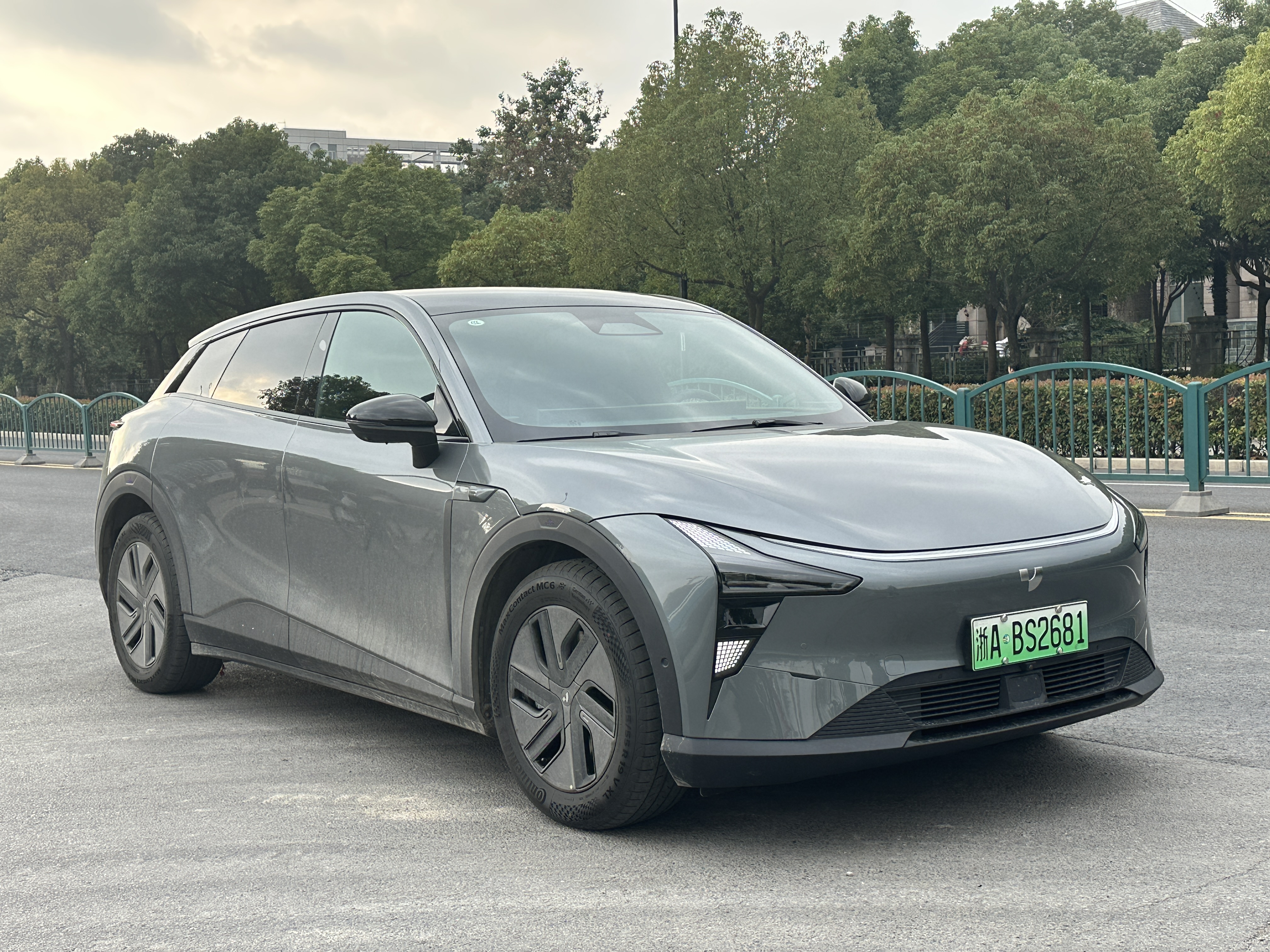
Ji Yue 01

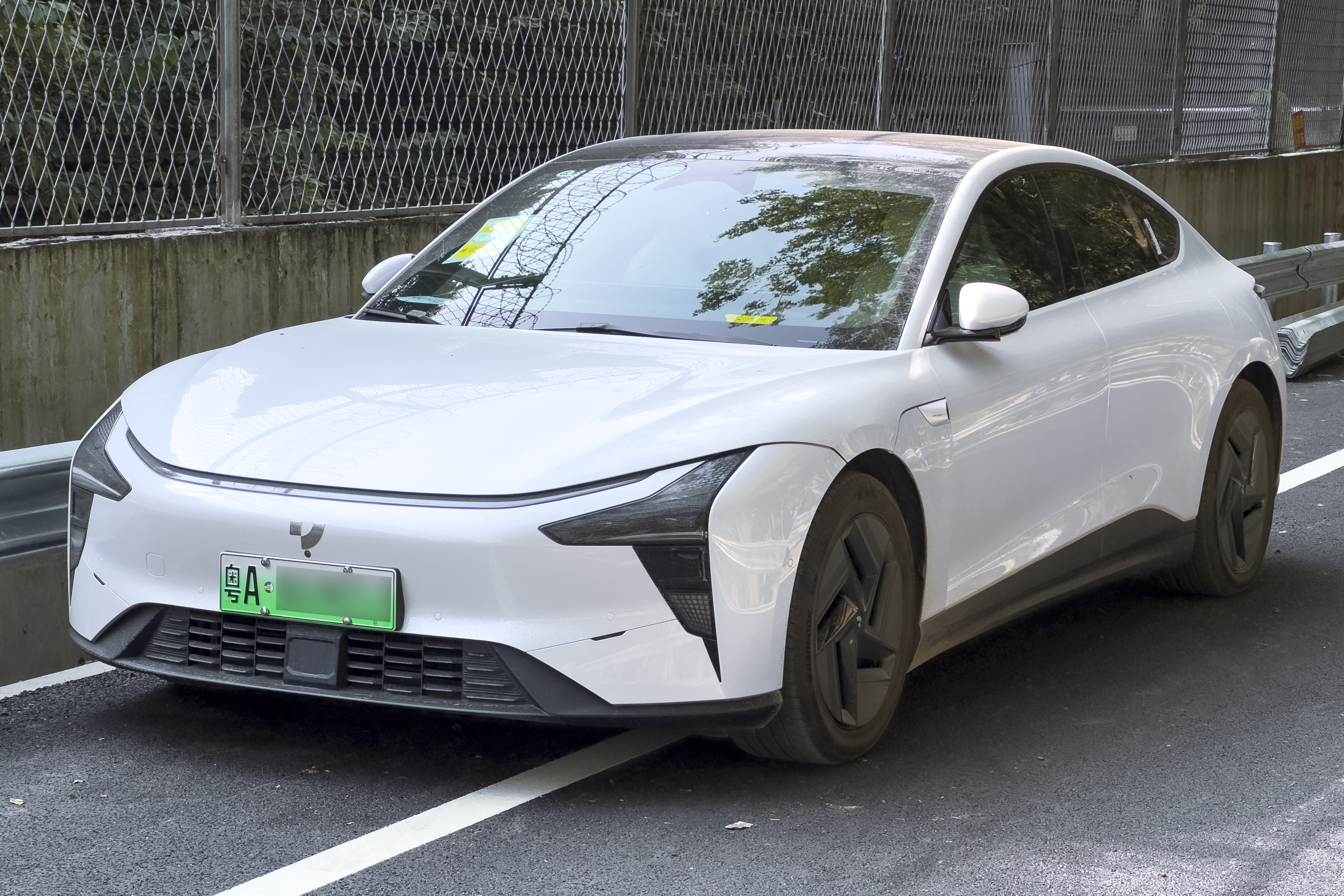
Ji Yue 07

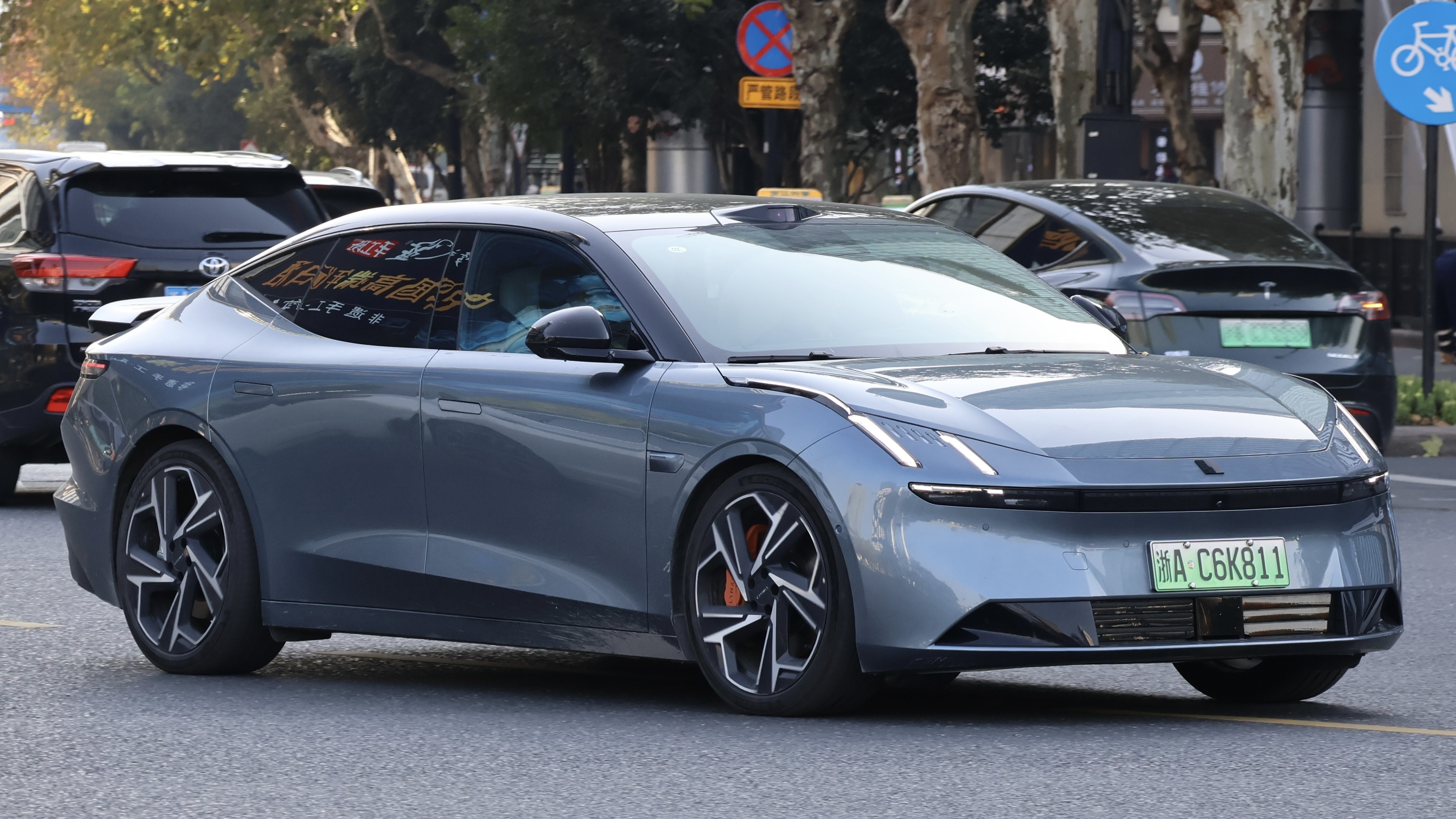
Lynk & Co Z10

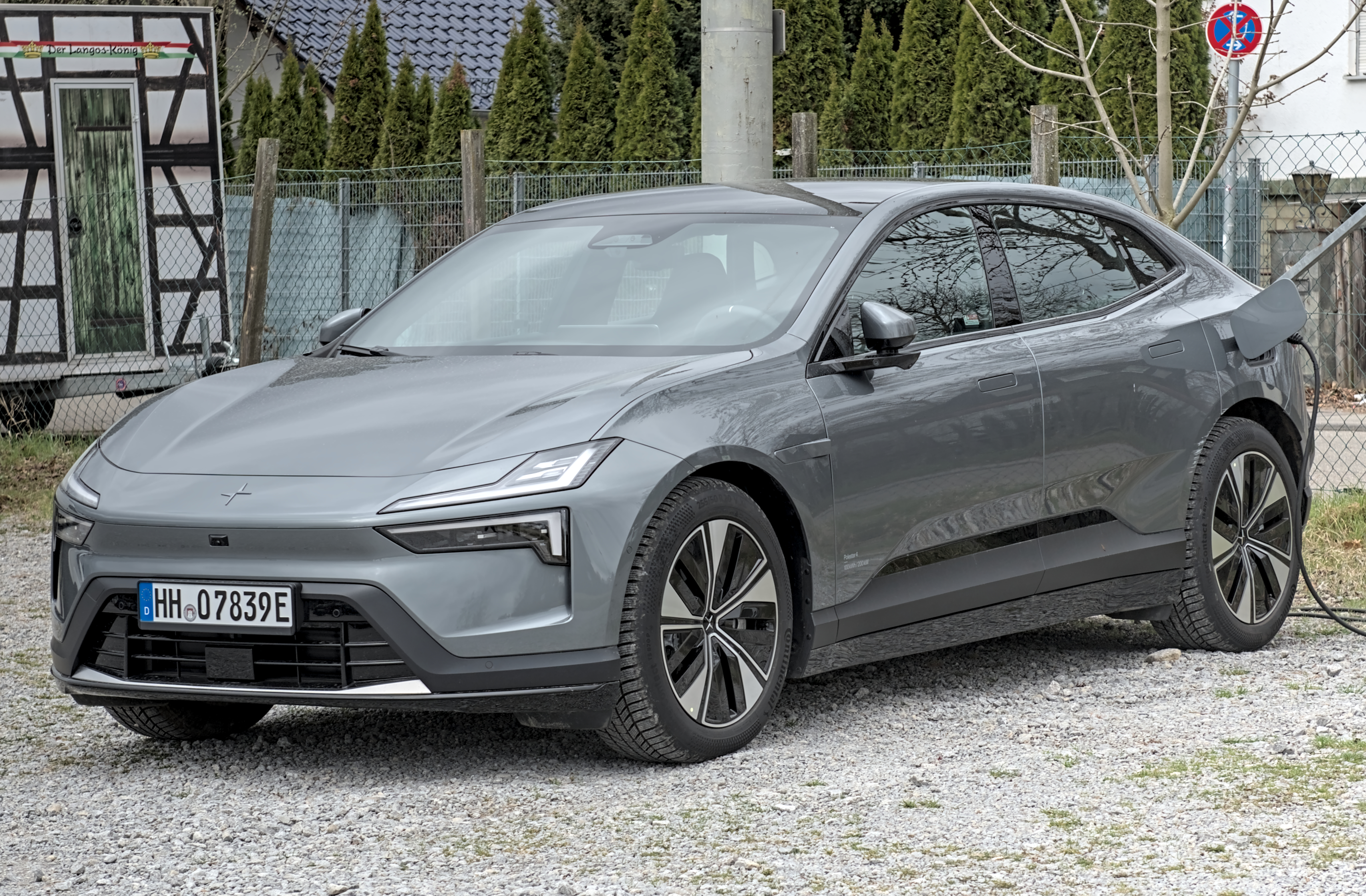
Polestar 4

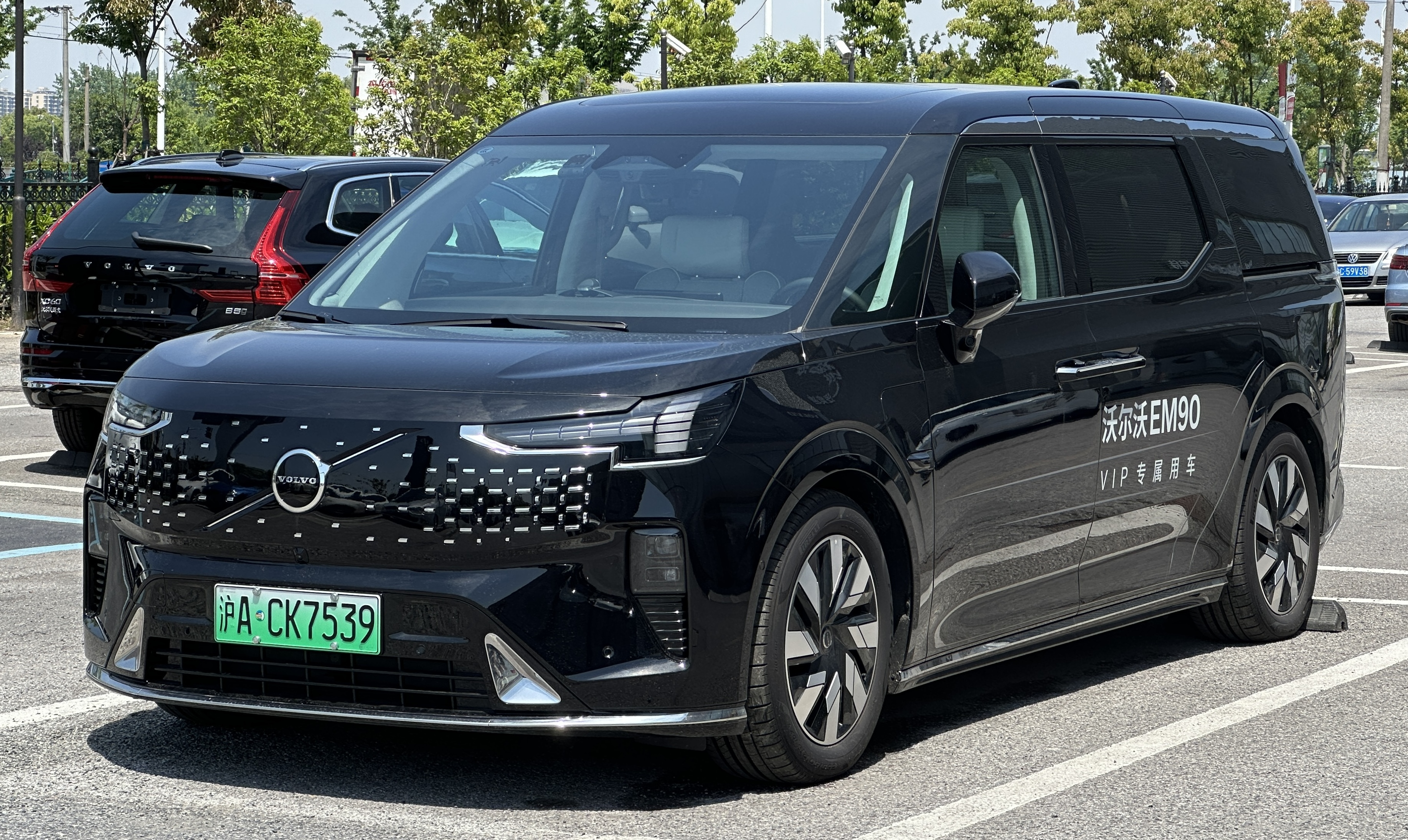
Volvo EM90

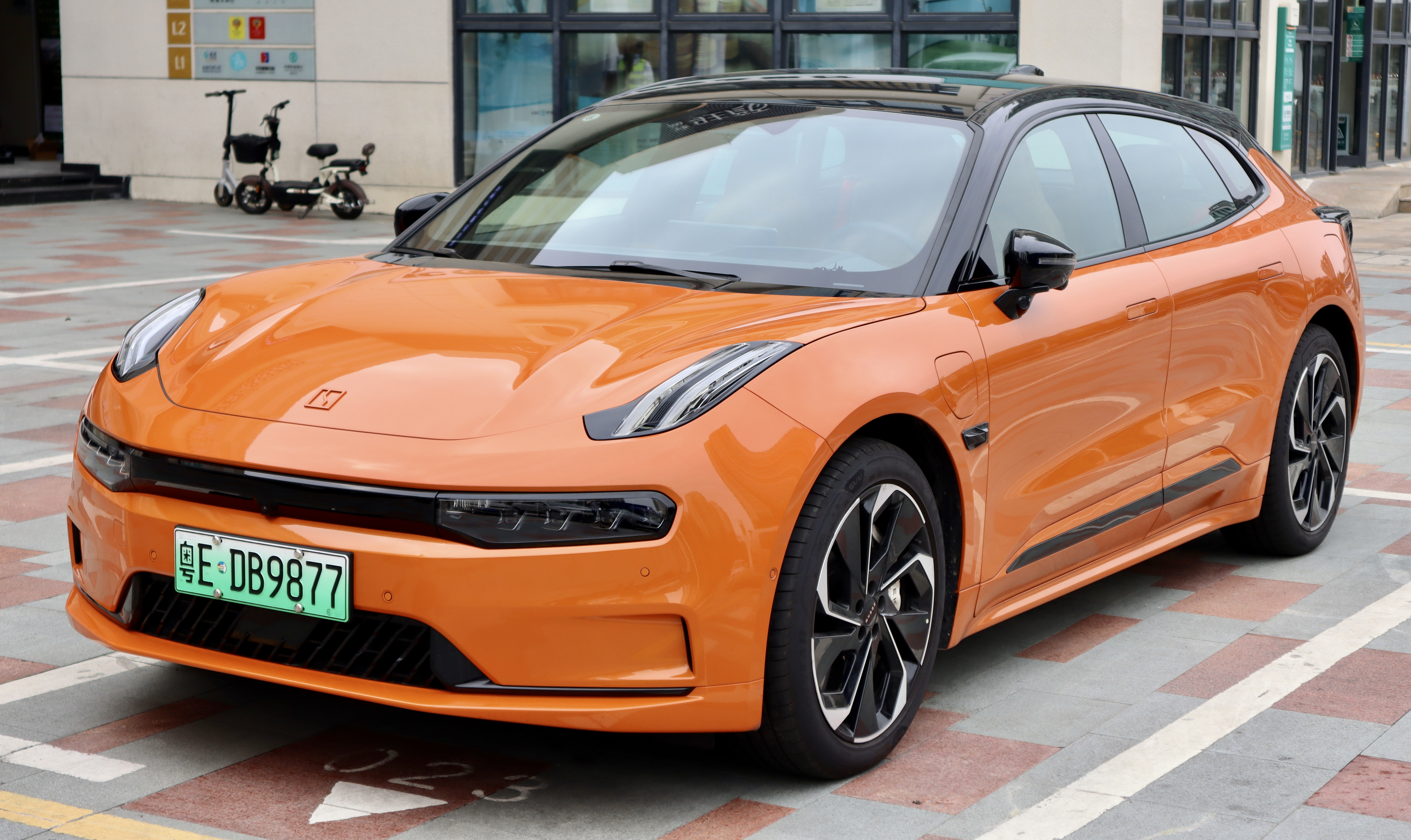
Zeekr 001

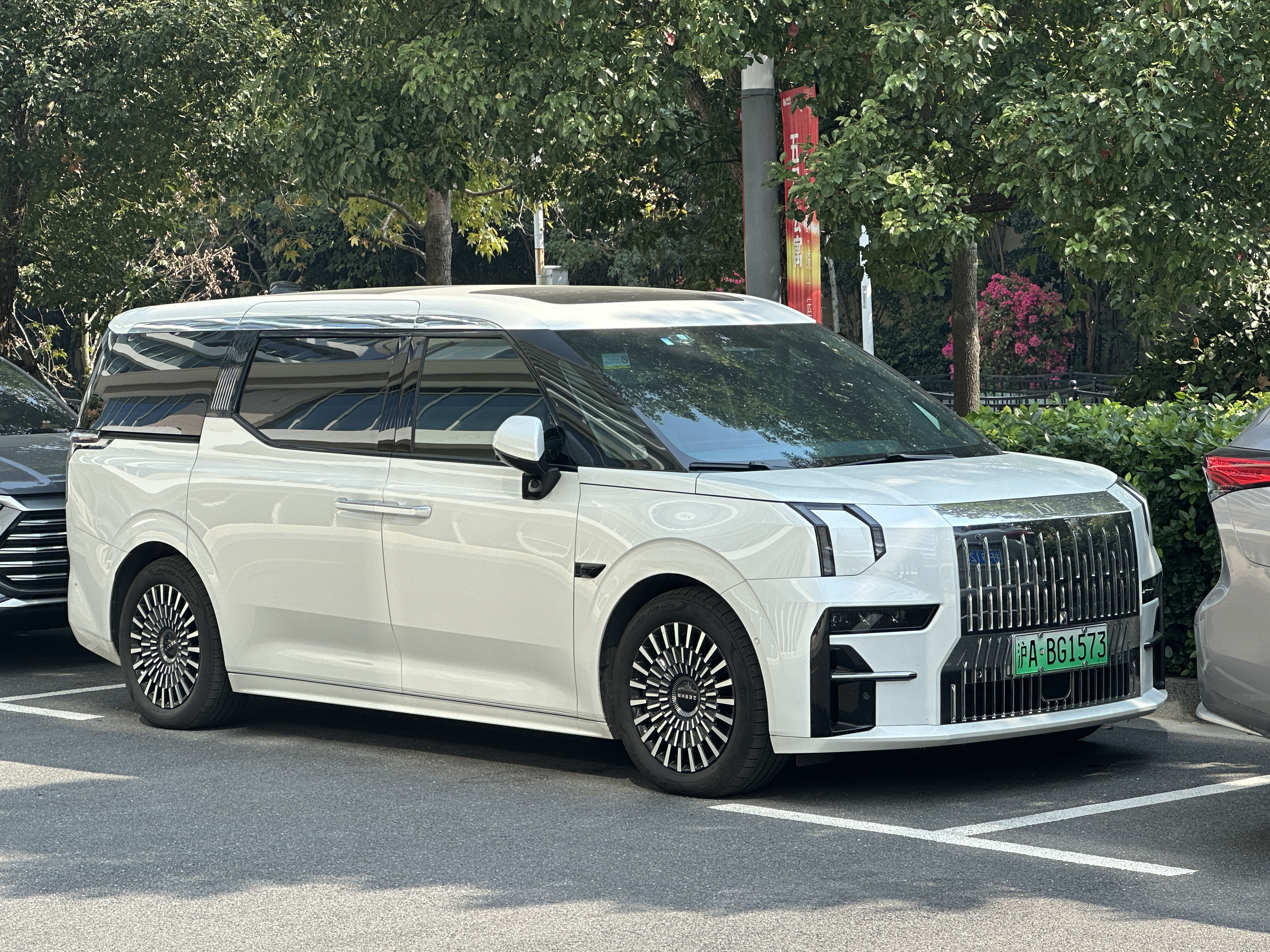
Zeekr 009

=== SEA2/PMA2 ===
- Lynk & Co Z20/02 (E335) (2024–present)
- Smart #1 (2022–present)
- Smart #3 (HC11) (2023–present)
- Volvo EX30 (2023–present)
- Zeekr X (BX1E) (2023–present)
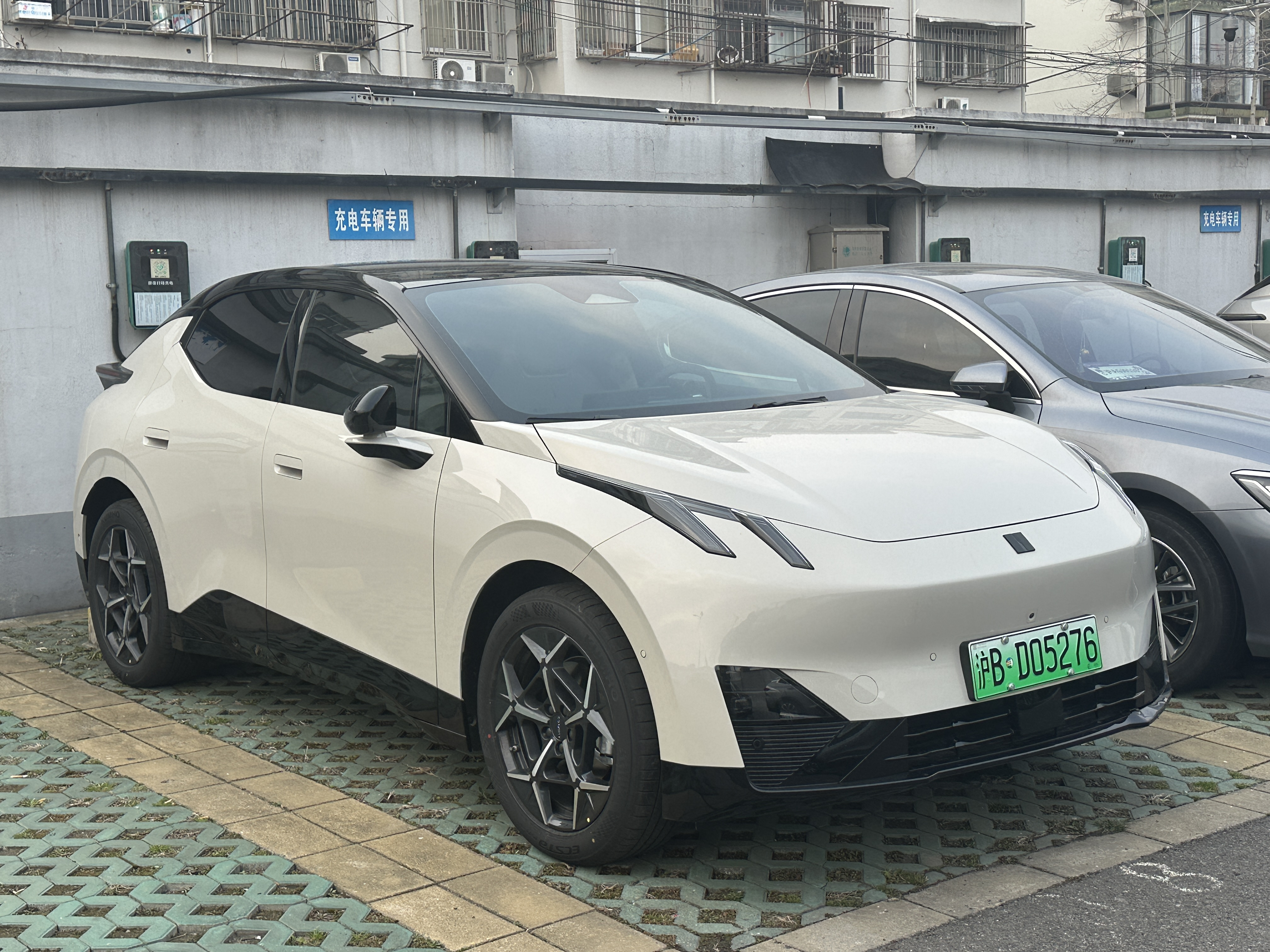
Lynk & Co Z20

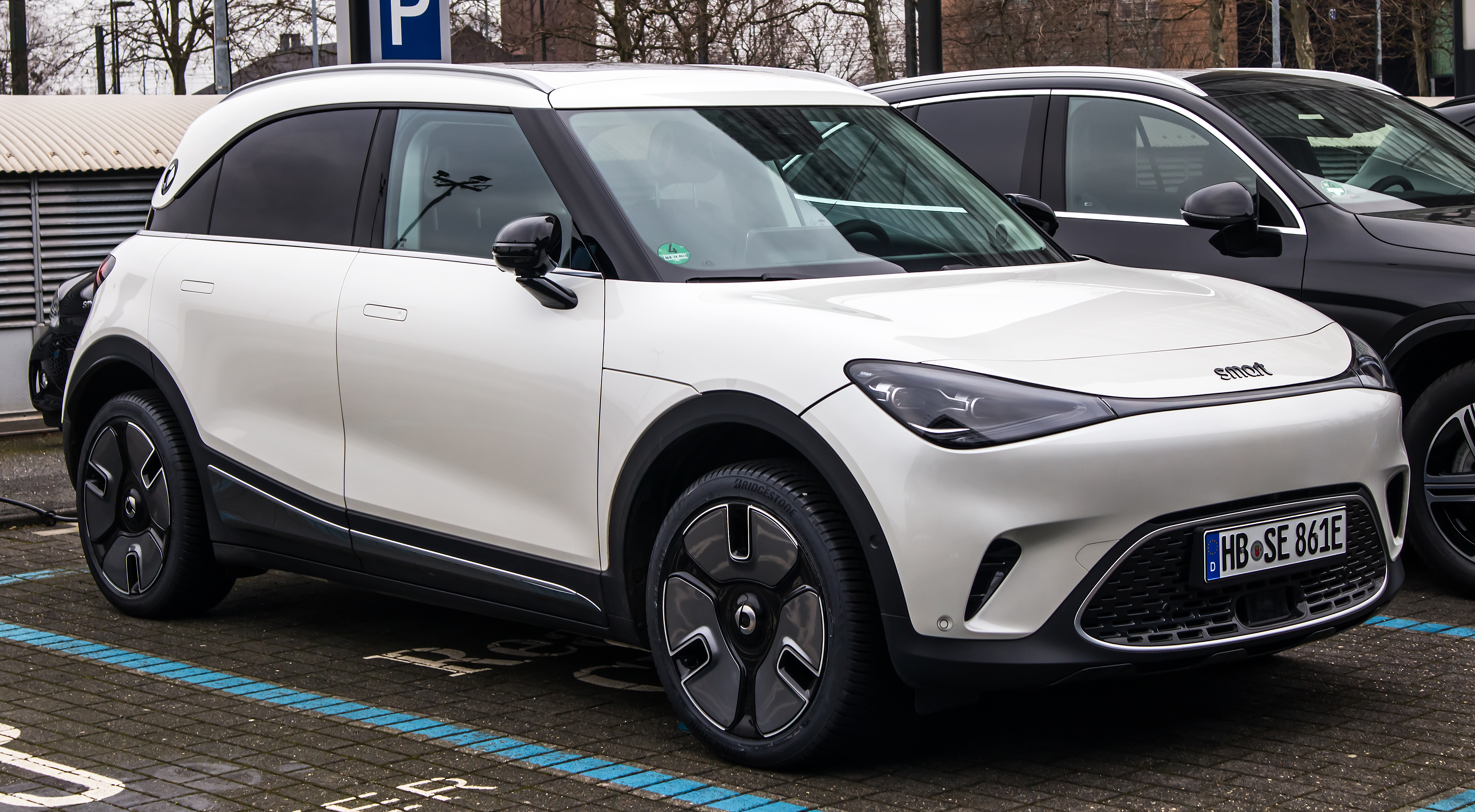
Smart #1

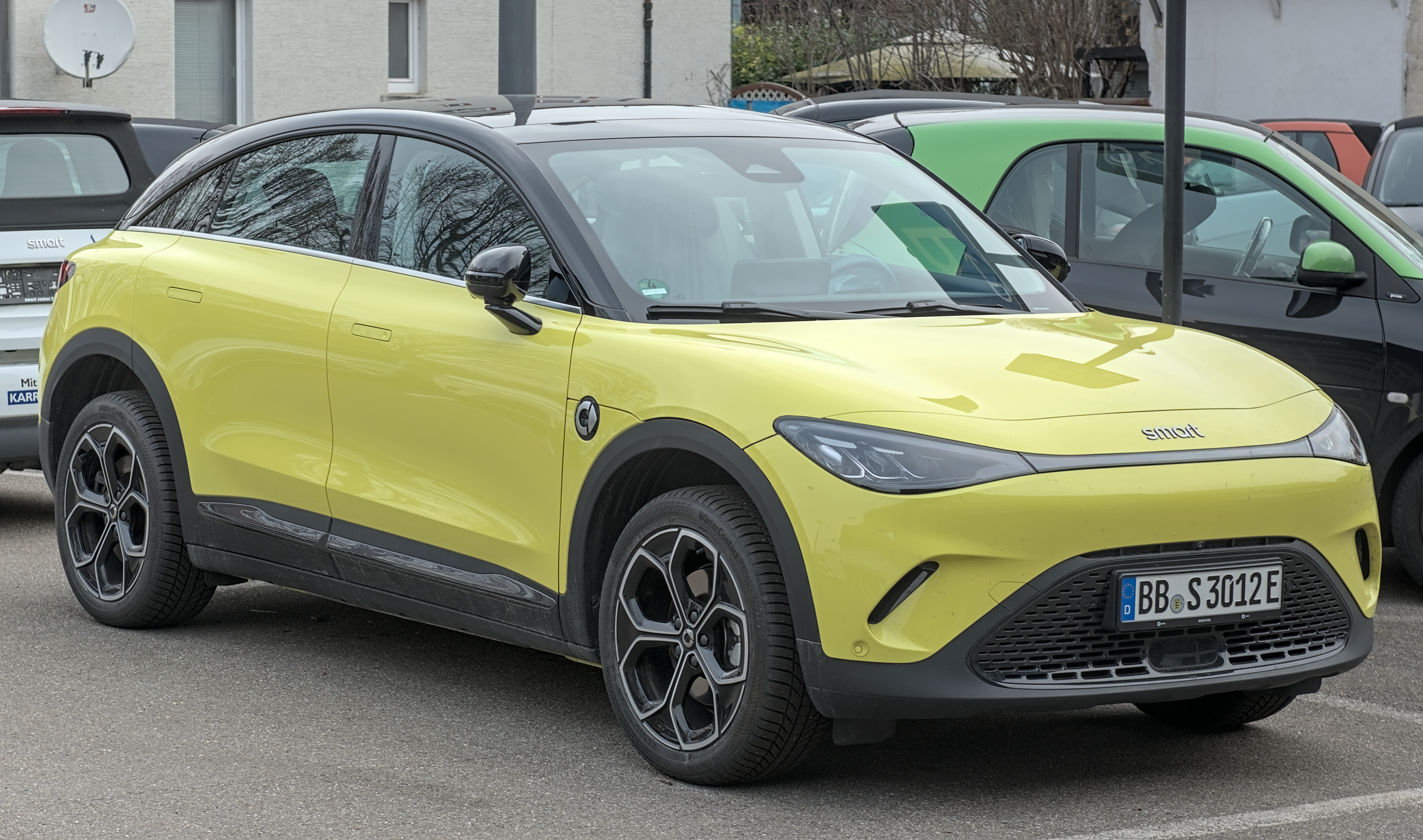
Smart #3

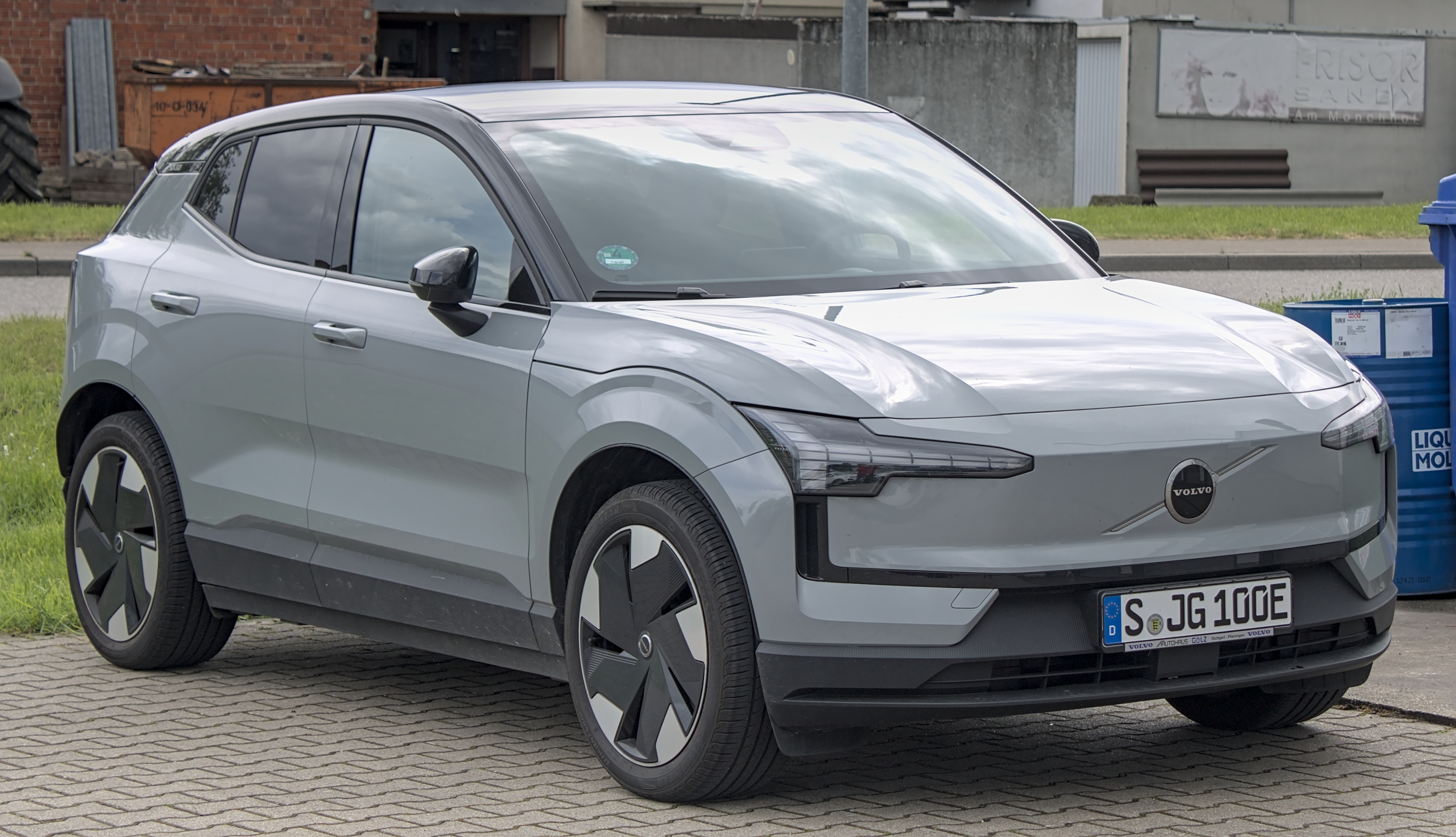
Volvo EX30

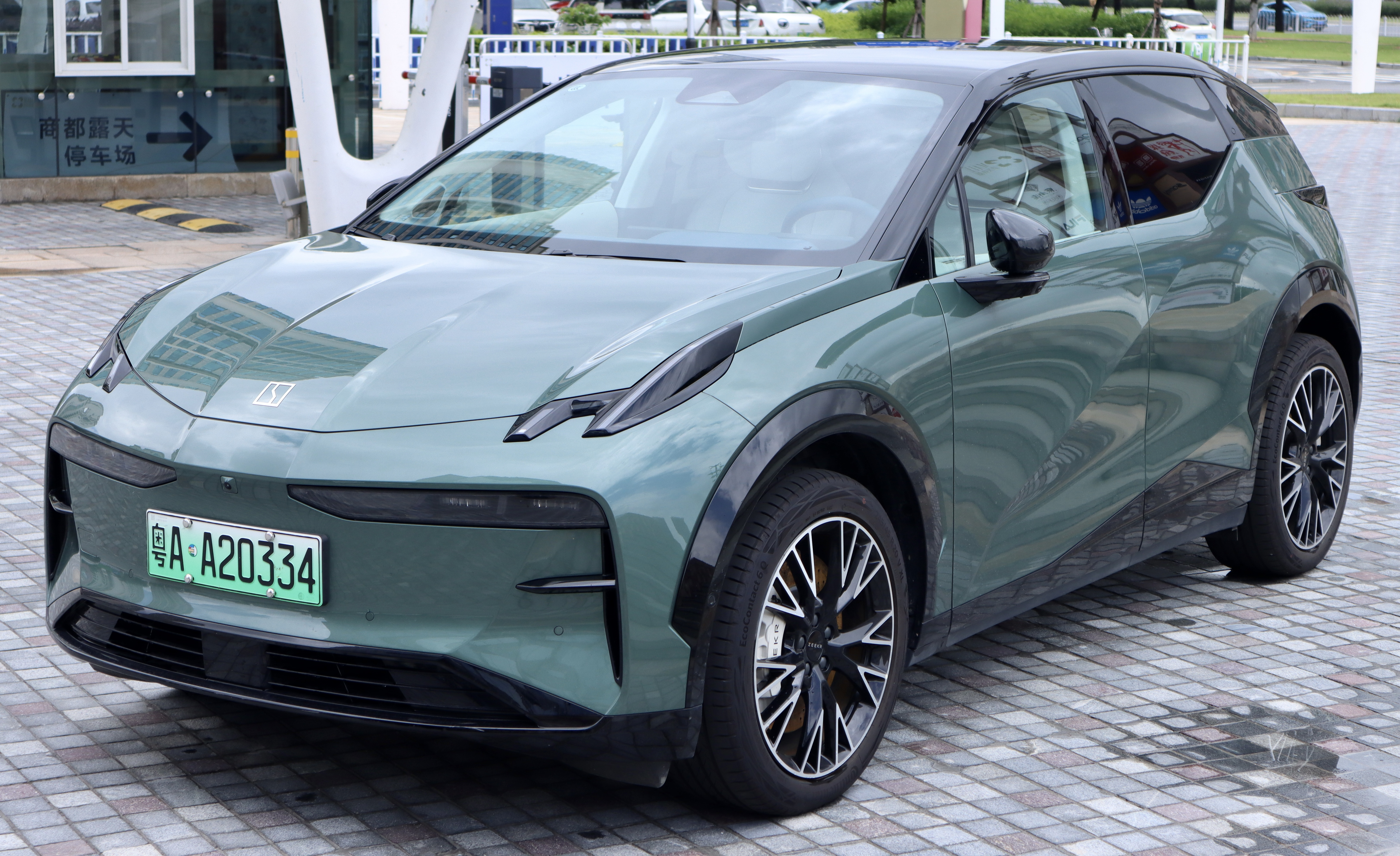
Zeekr X

=== SEA3/PMA2+ ===
- Geely Galaxy E8 (E171) (2023–present)
- Geely Galaxy TT (2026–present)
- Smart #5 (HY11) (2024–present)
- Smart #6 (HS11) (2026–present)
- Zeekr 007 (CS1E) (2023–present)
- Zeekr 007 GT (CC1E) (2025–present)
- Zeekr 7X (CX1E) (2024–present)
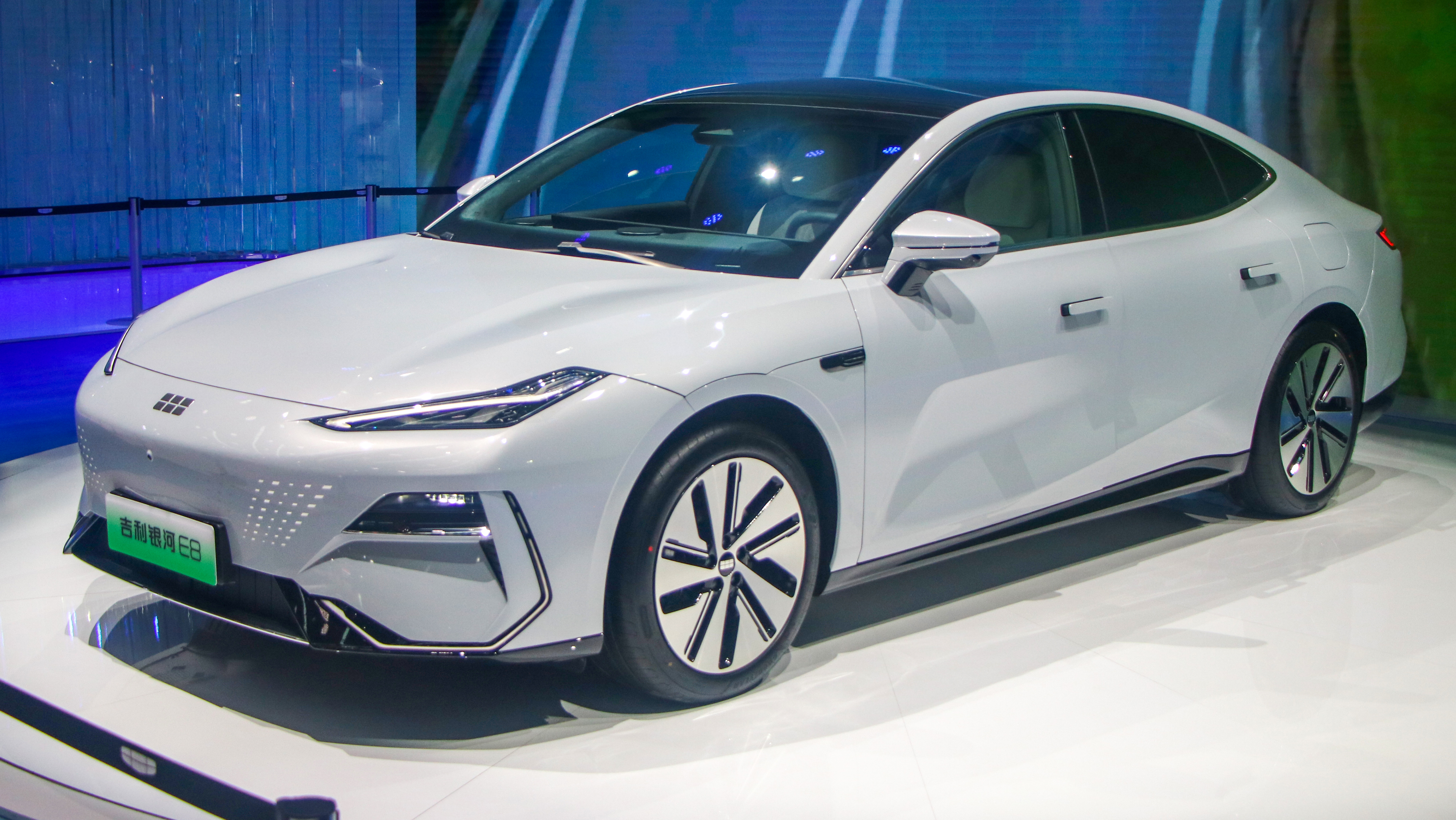
Geely Galaxy E8

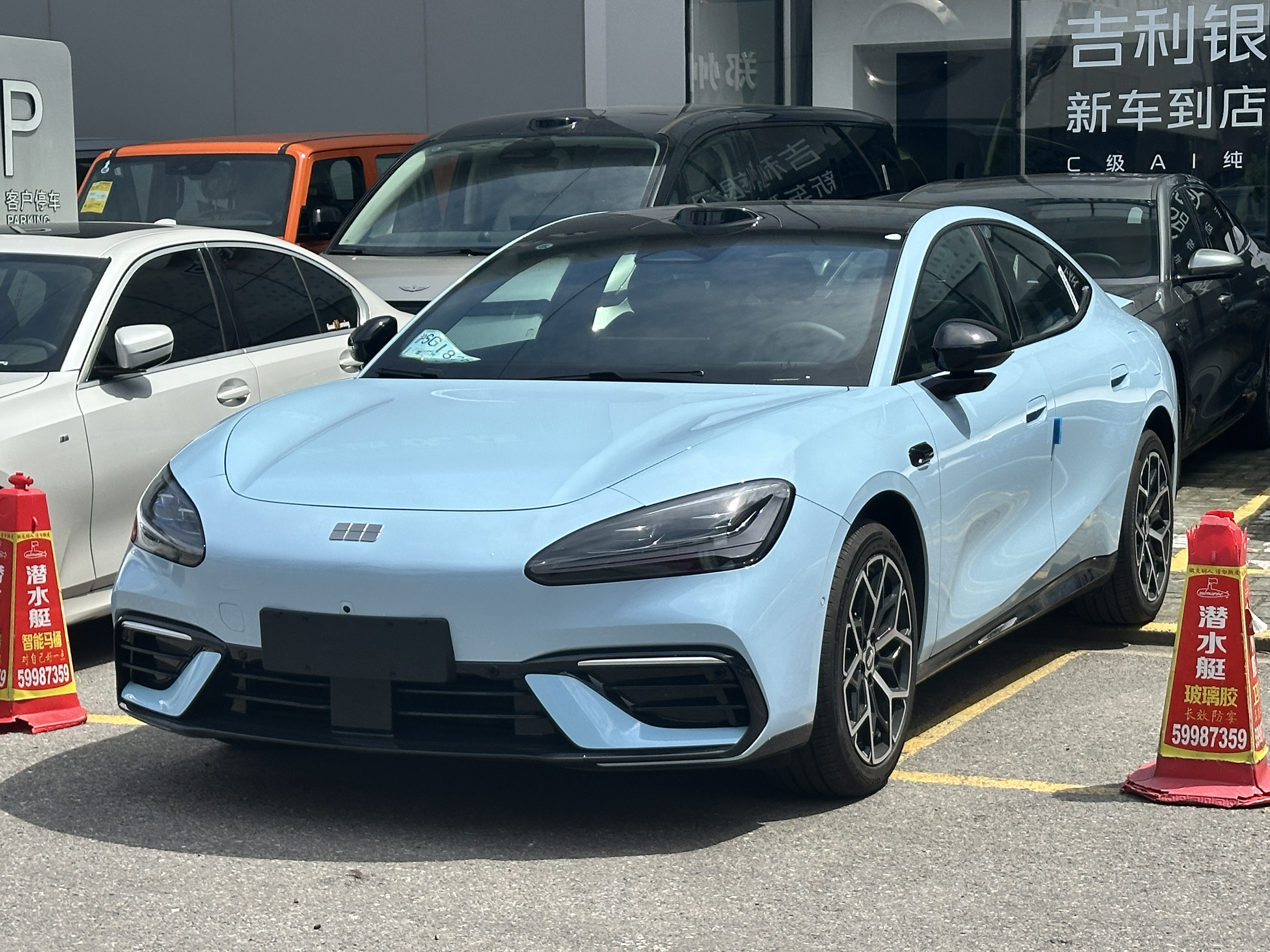
Geely Galaxy TT

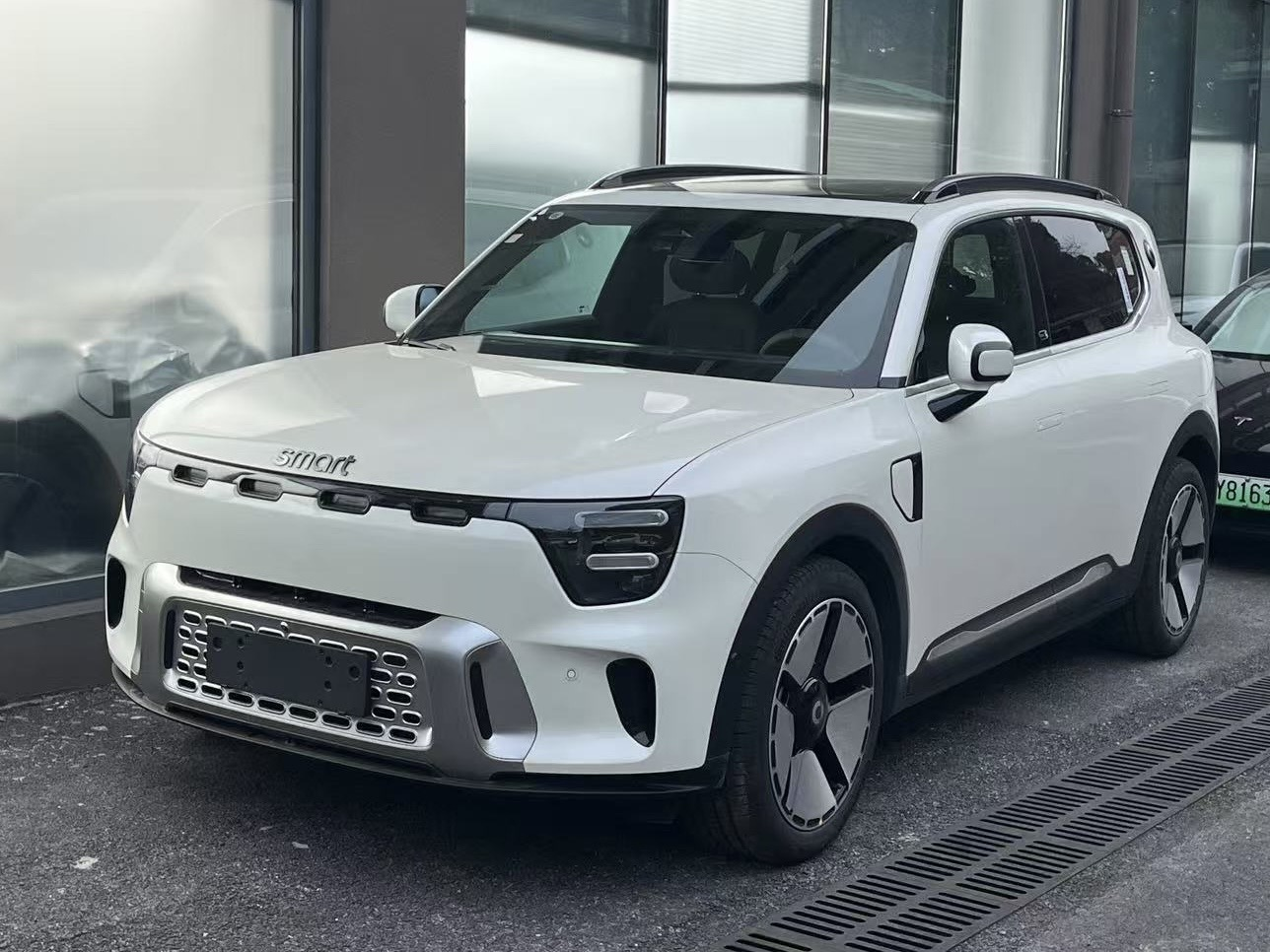
Smart #5

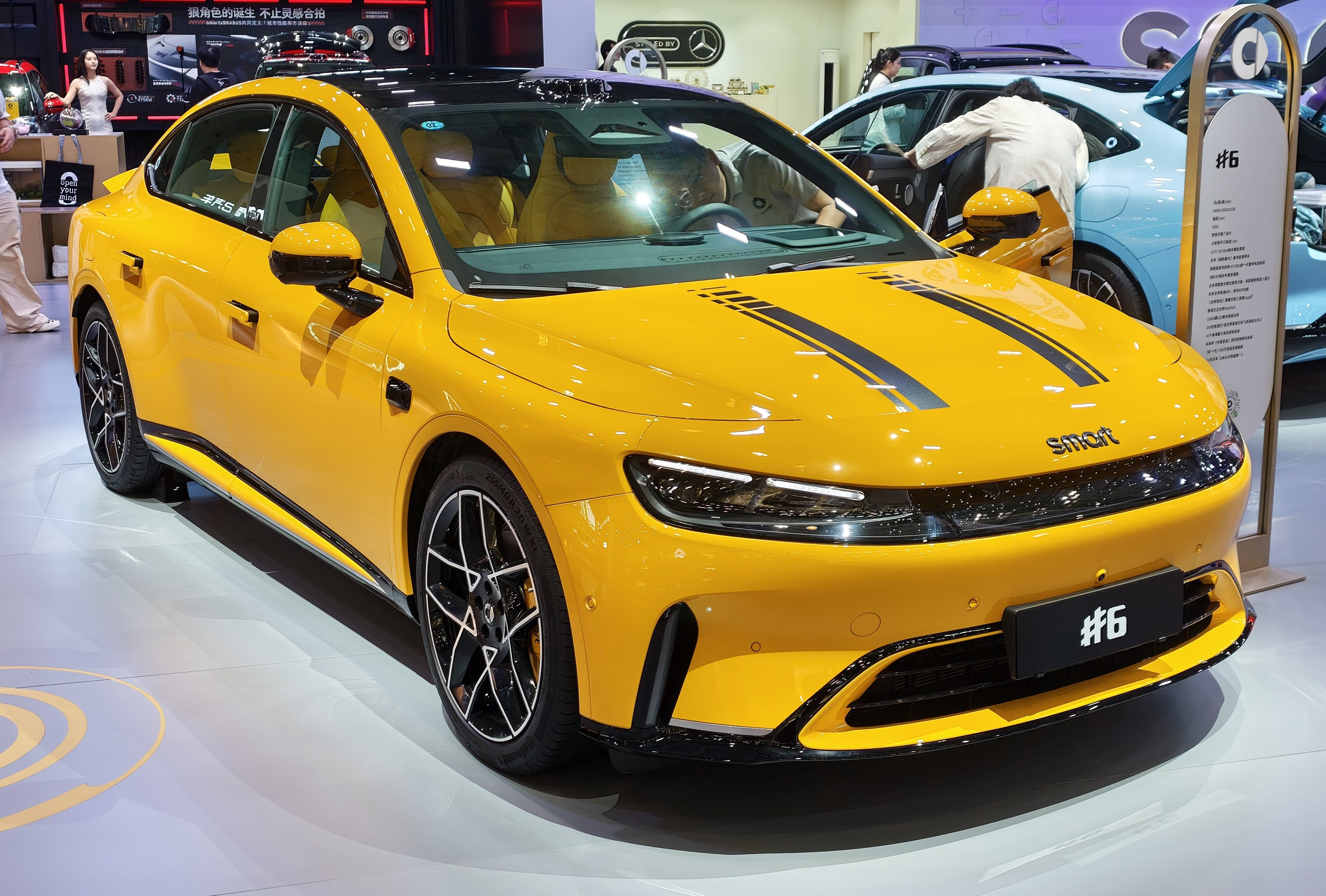
Smart #6

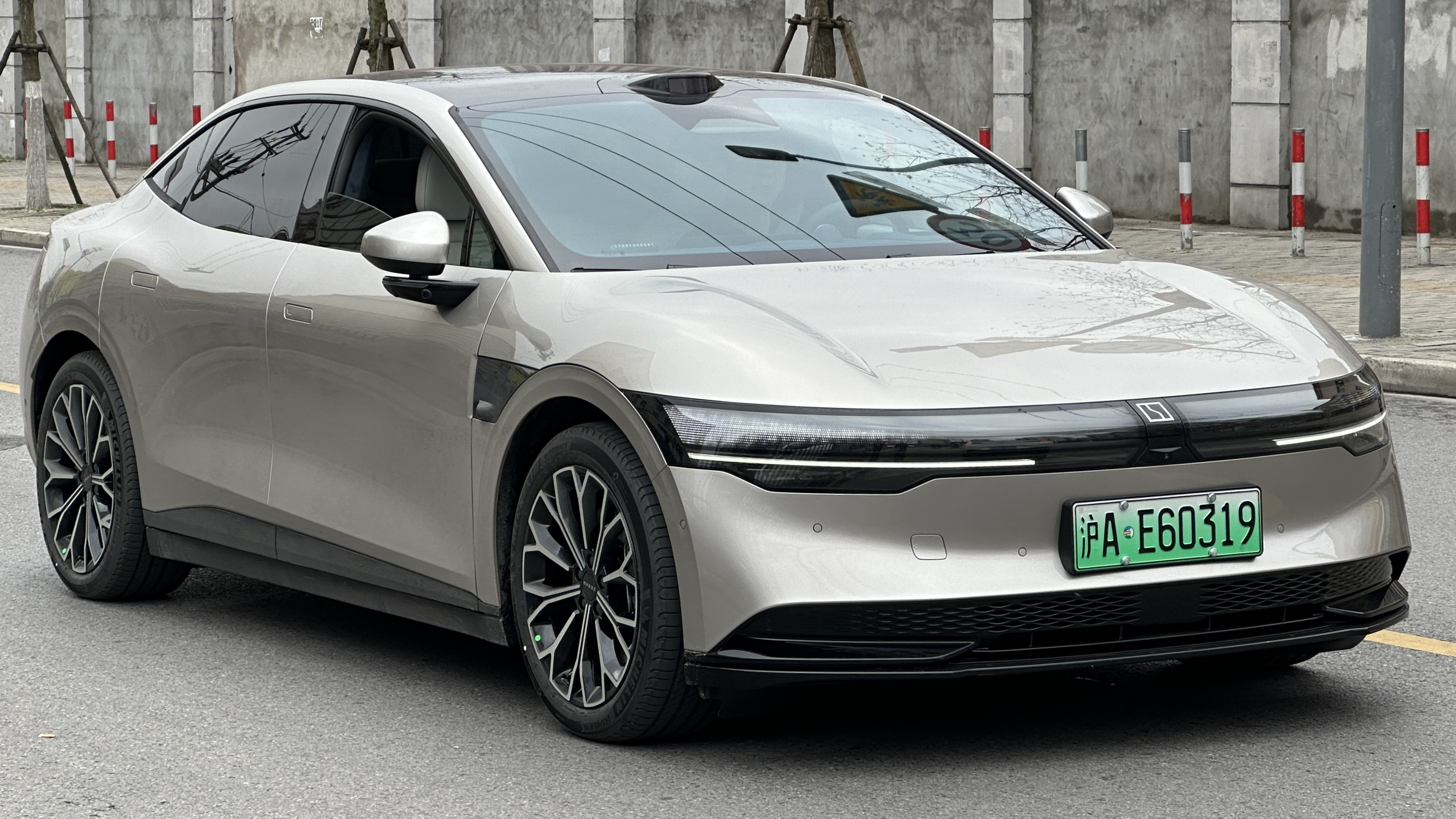
Zeekr 007

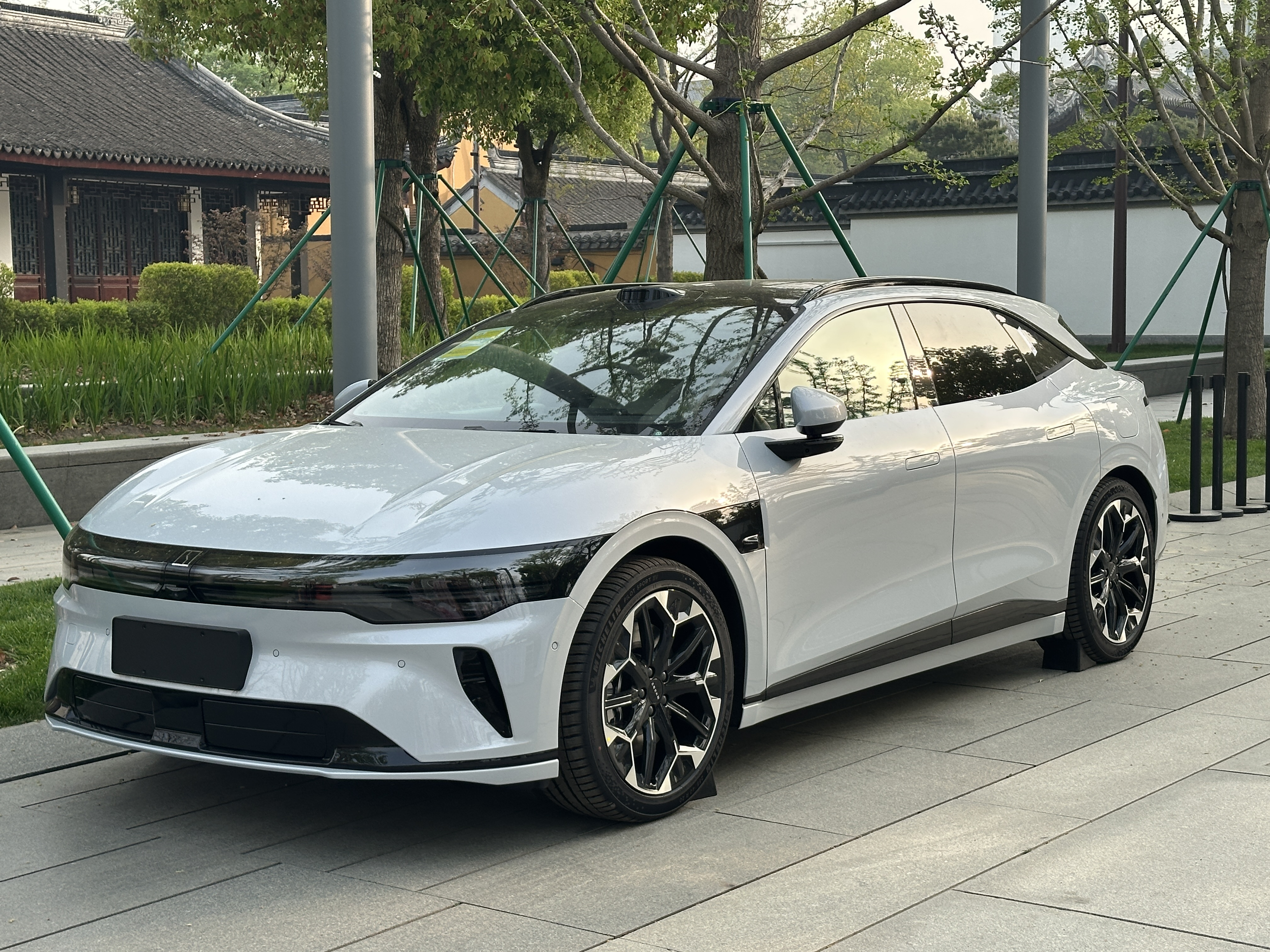
Zeekr 007 GT

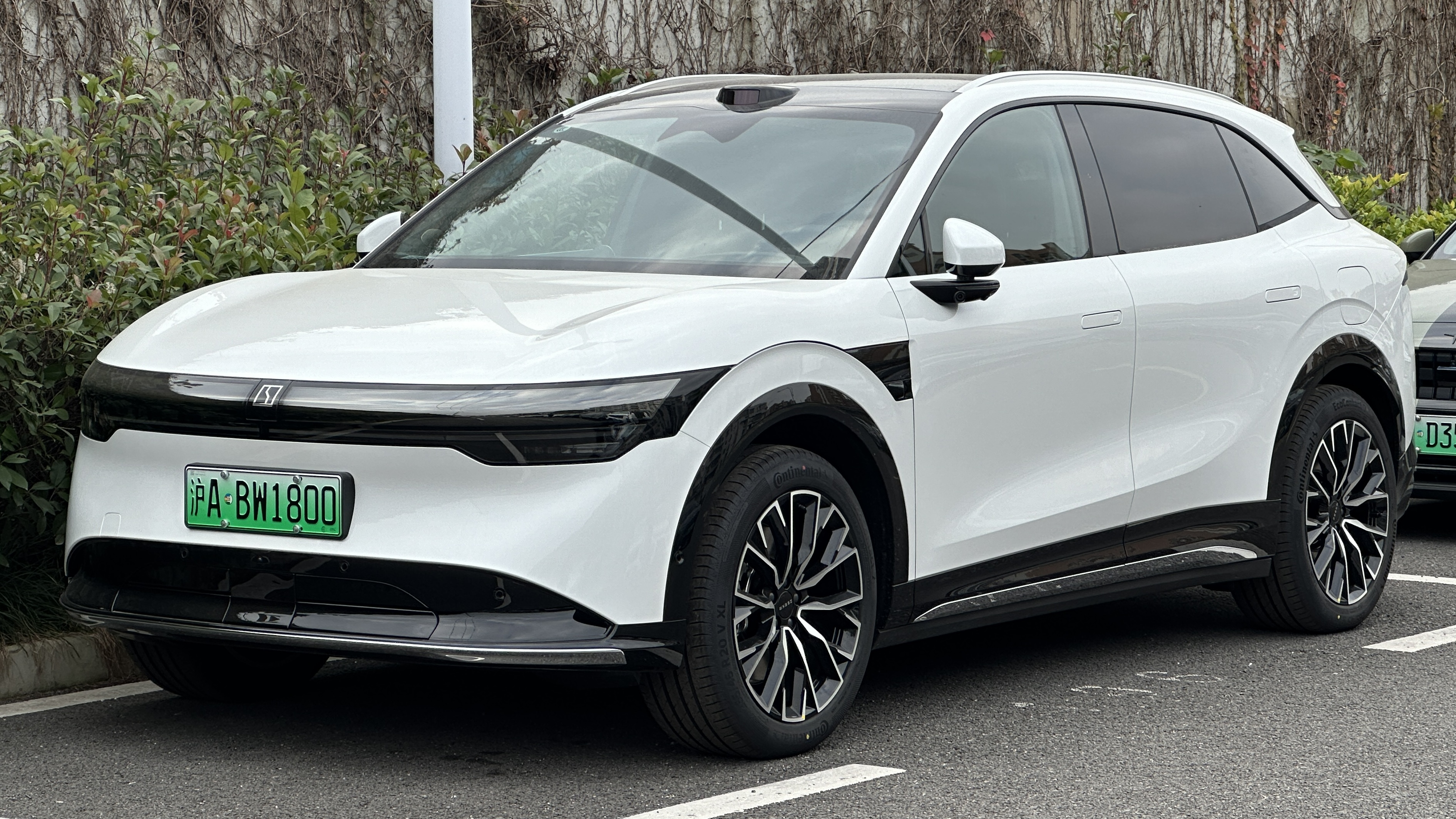
Zeekr 7X

=== SEA-S/EPA(Electric Premium Architecture) ===
- Lotus Eletre (2022–present)
- Lotus Emeya (2024–present)
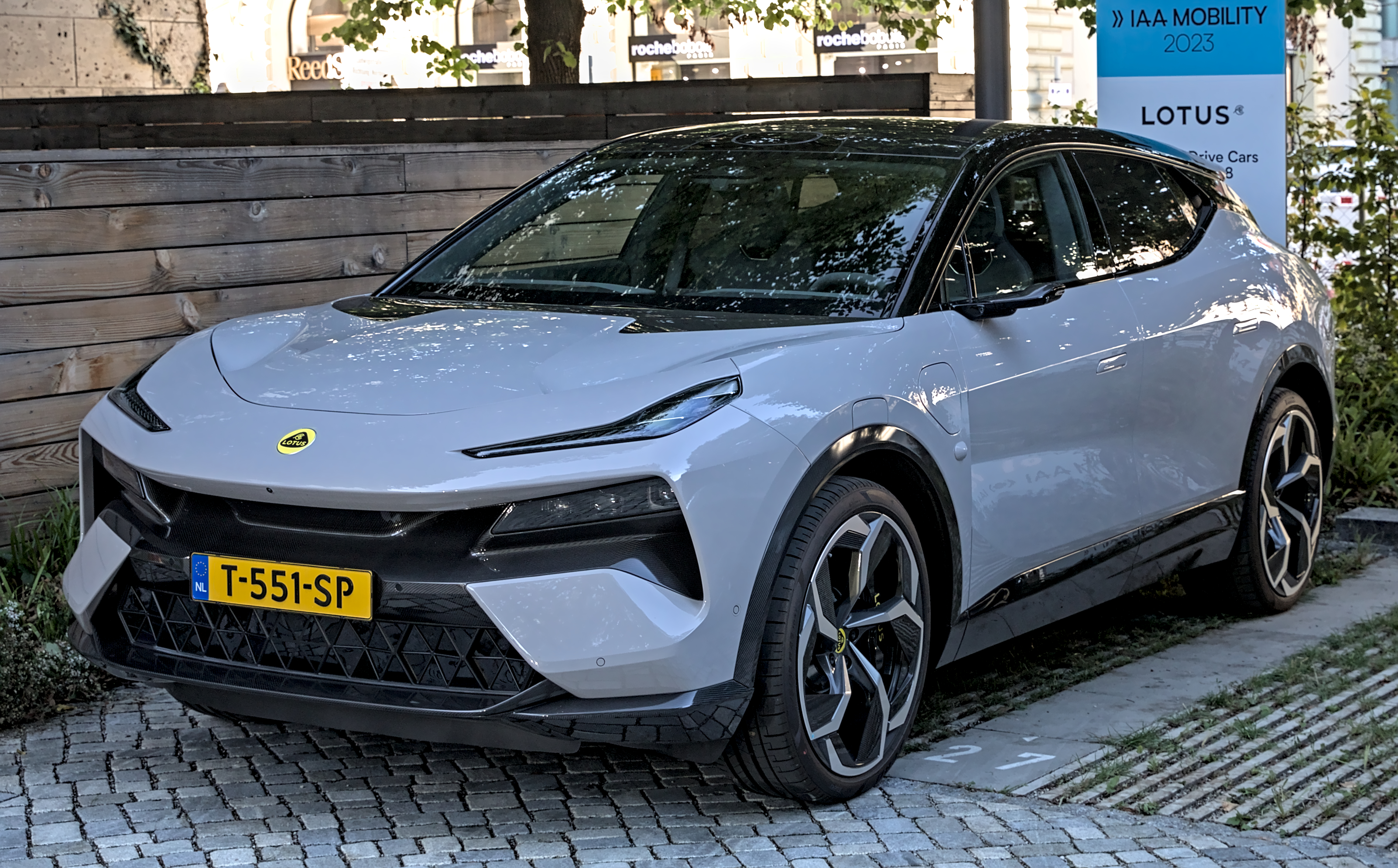
Lotus Eletre

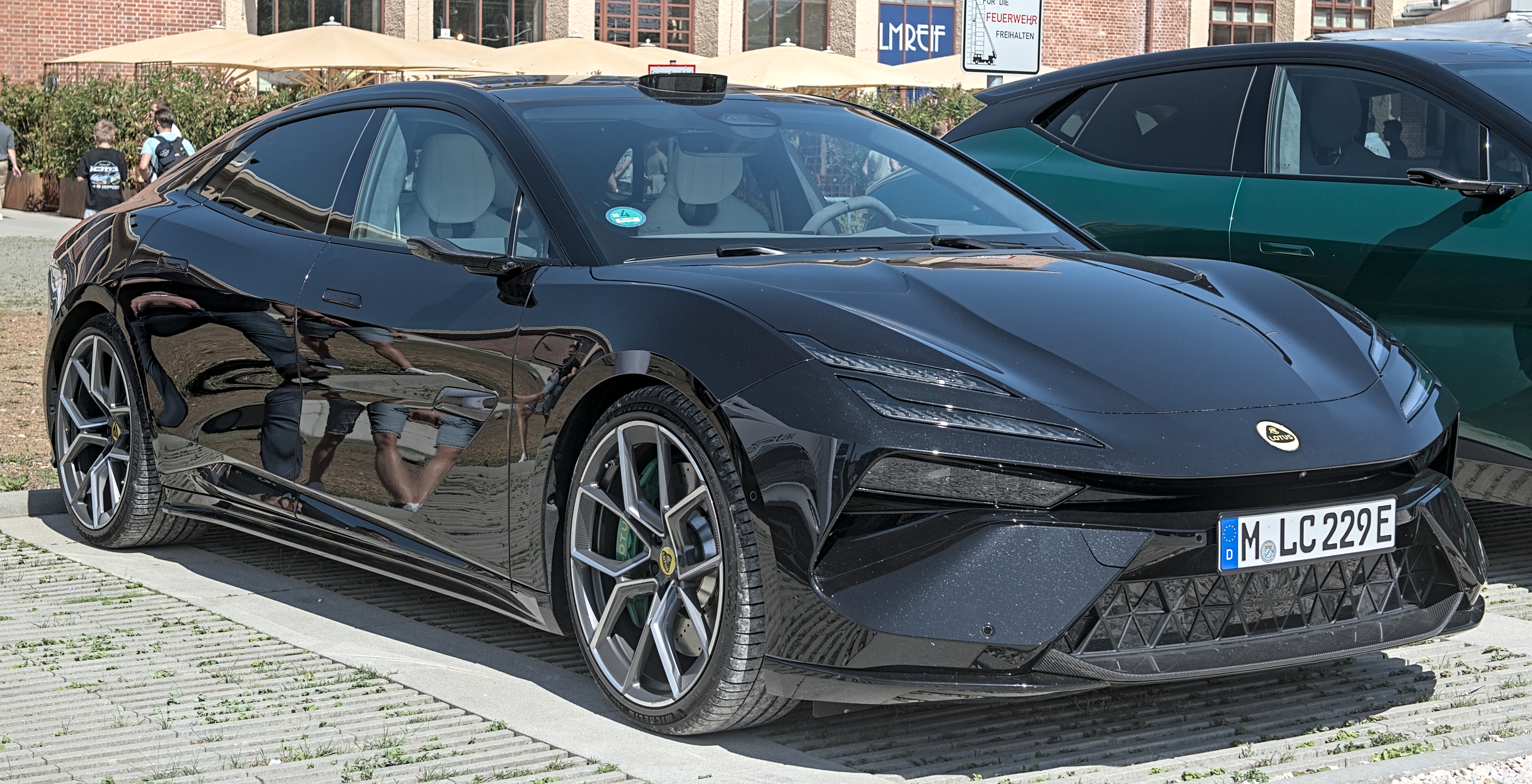
Lotus Emeya

=== SEA-R ===
- Lotus Eletre X/ For Me (2026–present)
- Zeekr 9X (EX1H) (2025–present)
- Zeekr 8X (DX1H) (2026–present)
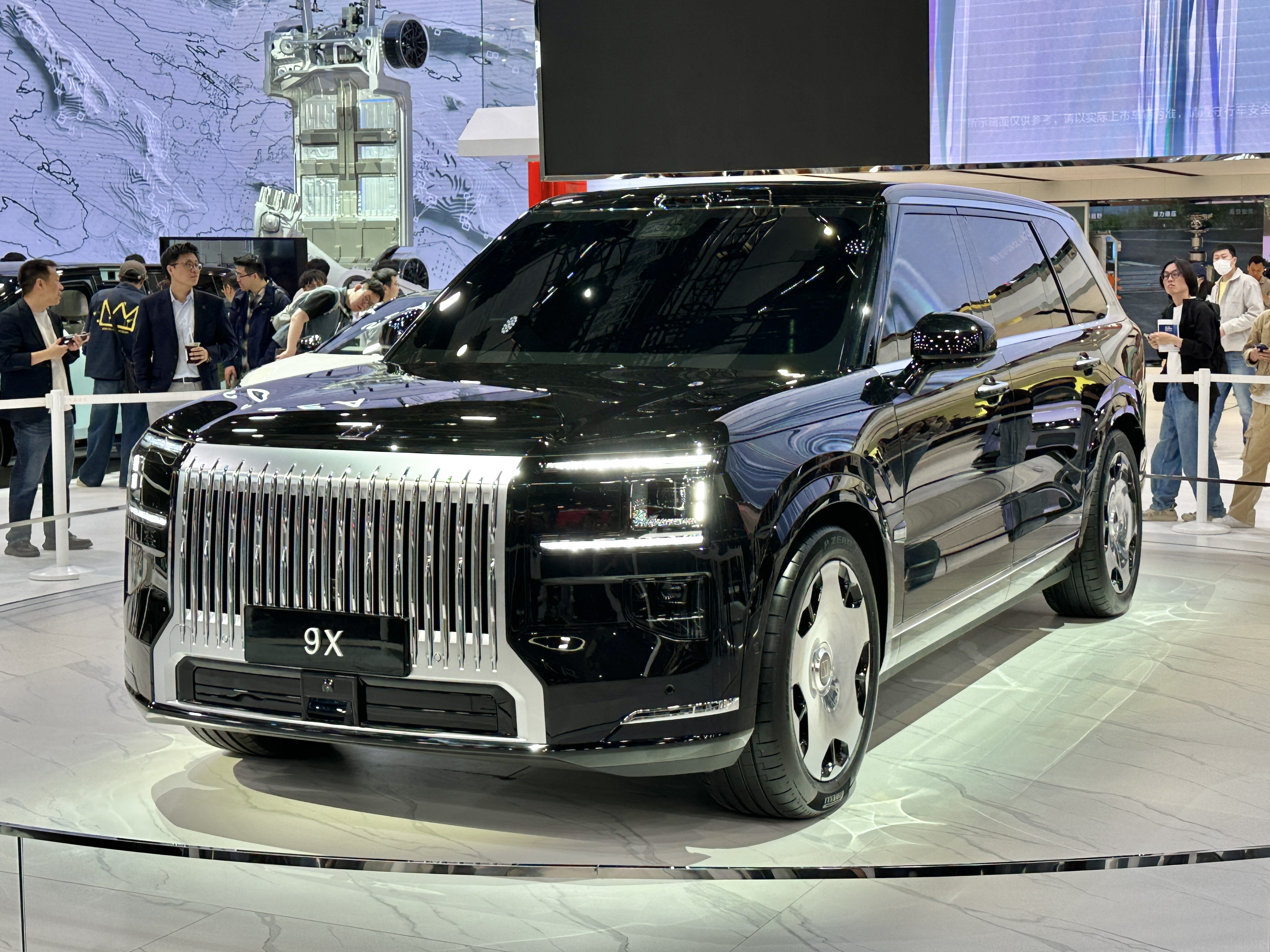
Zeekr 9X

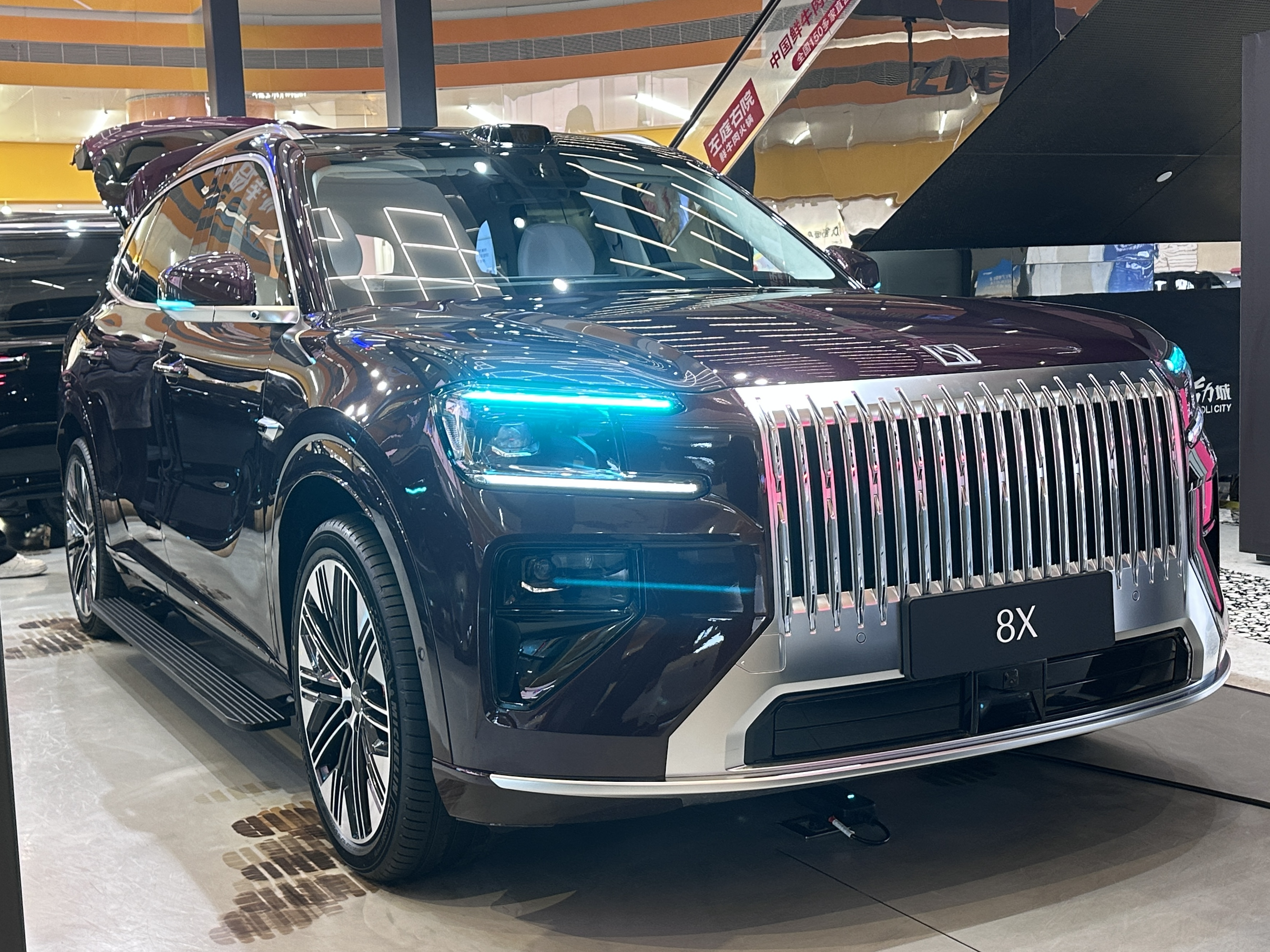
Zeekr 8X

=== SEA-M ===
- Zeekr Mix (CM2E) (2024–present)
- Waymo Ojai (CM1E) (2024–present)
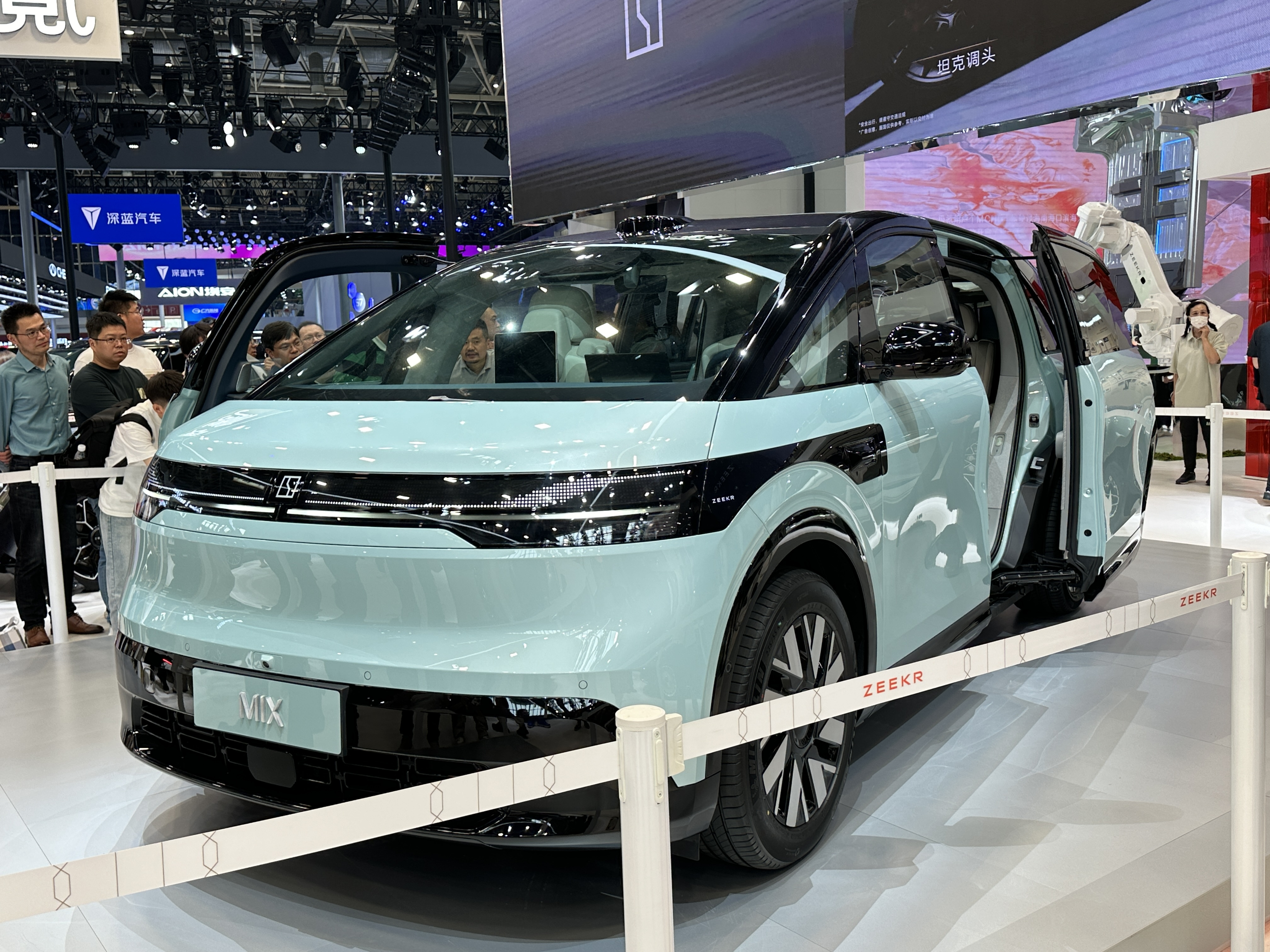
Zeekr Mix

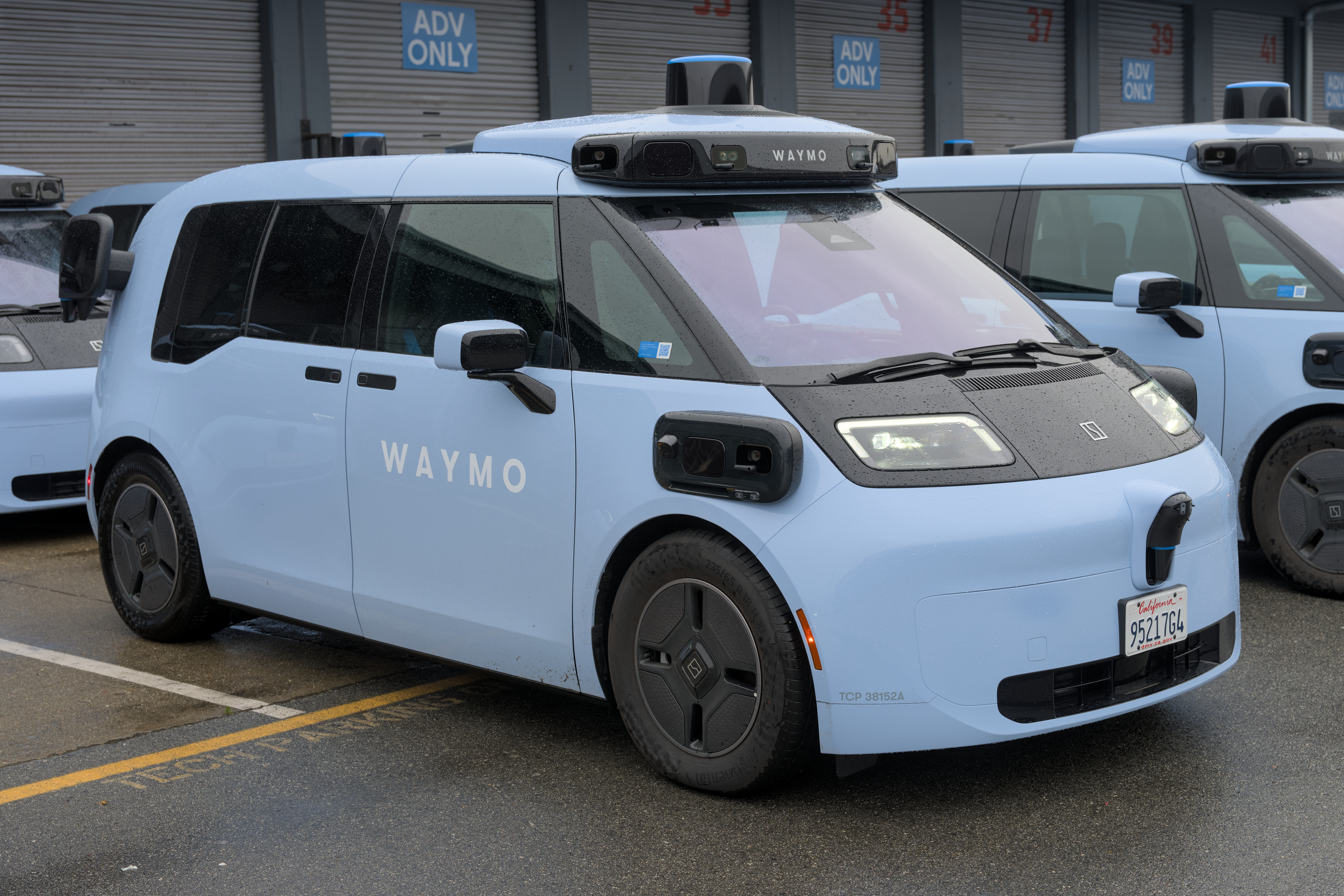
Waymo Ojai

=== SEA-MAP ===
- Radar Horizon / Riddara RD6 / Radar King Kong (KO11) (2022–present)
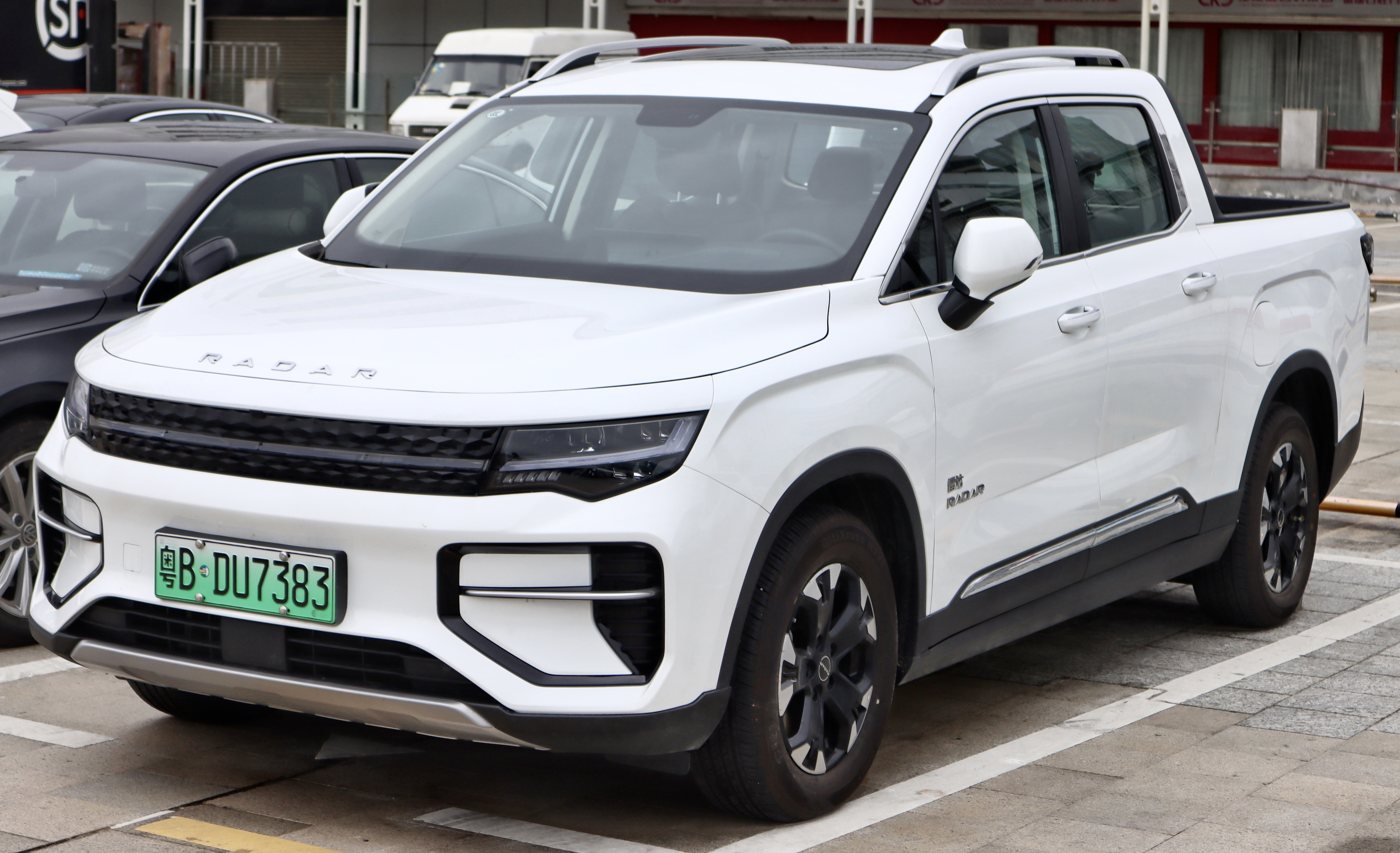
Radar Horizon

=== SOA ===
The Space Oriented Architecture (SOA) platform, alternatively Geely Electric Architecture is a derivative of SEA

- Geely Galaxy LEVC L380 (XE08) (2024–present)
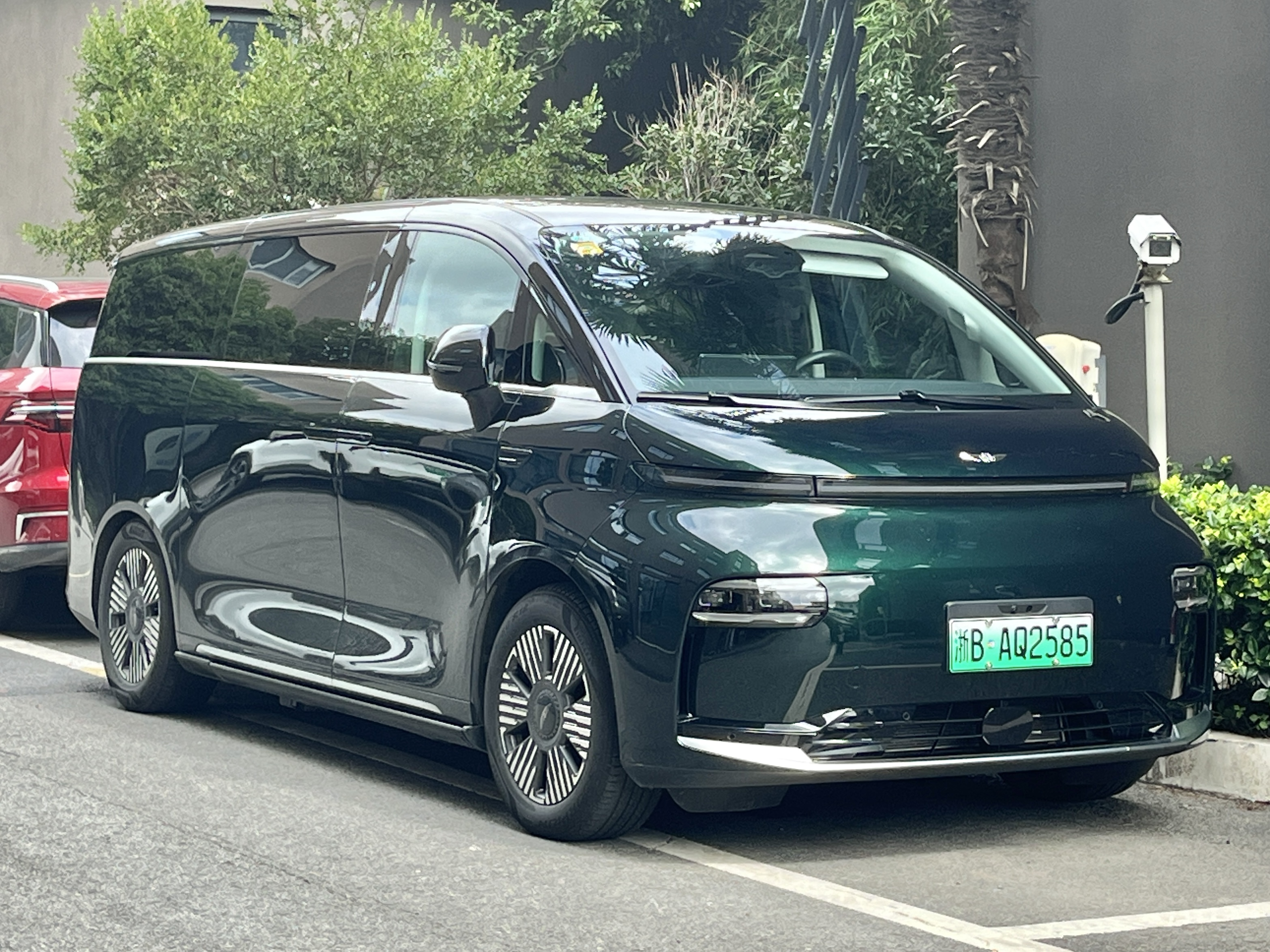
Geely Galaxy LEVC L380

=== GBRC ===
The Global Battery Rapid Change platform, variant of SEA platform, is for battery swappable rear-motor, rear-wheel-drive or front-engine, rear-motor hybrid vehicle.

- Livan 7 (2023–present)
- Maple Cao Cao 60 (2023–present)
- Geely Boyue REV (2026–present)
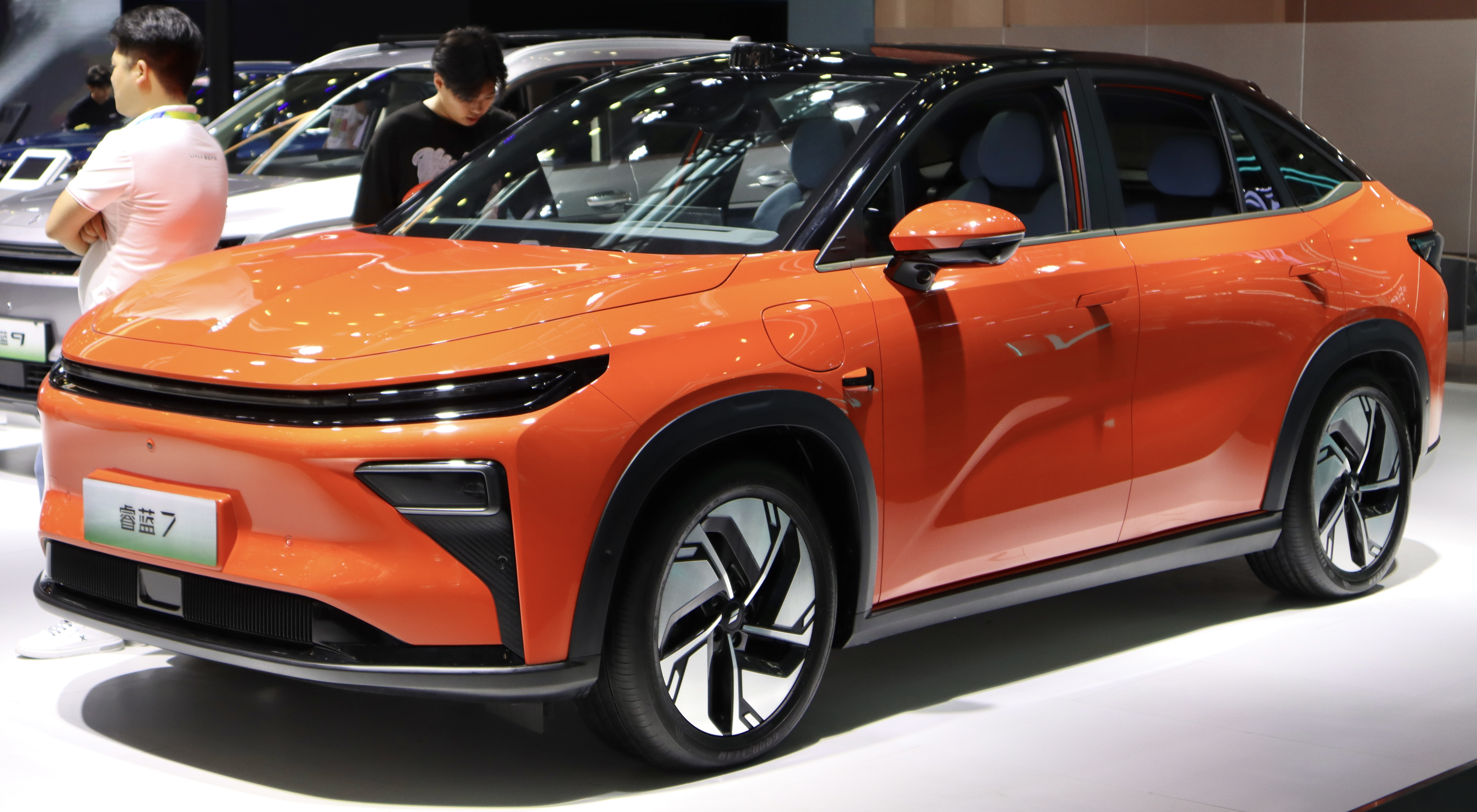
Livan 7

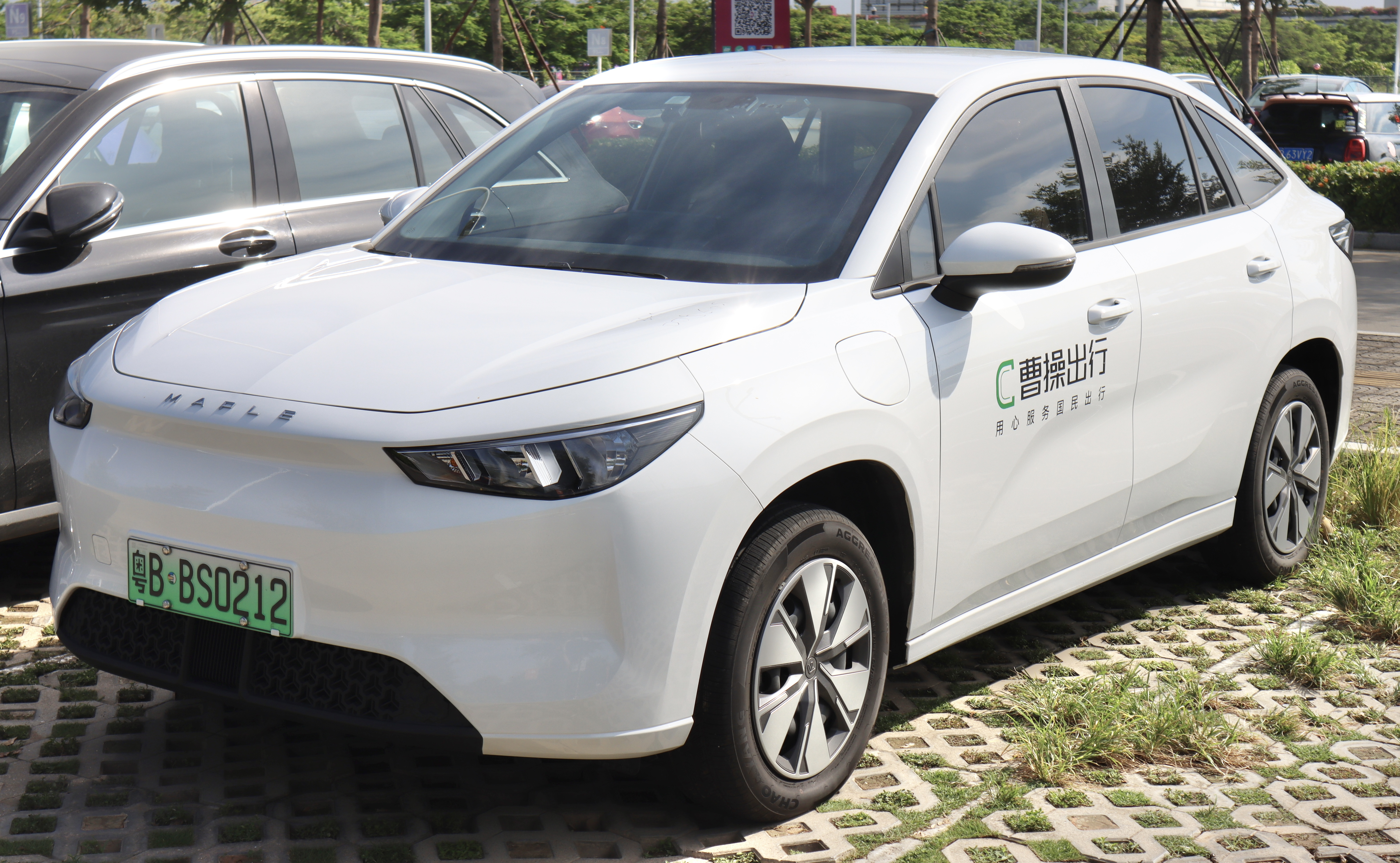
Maple Cao Cao 60

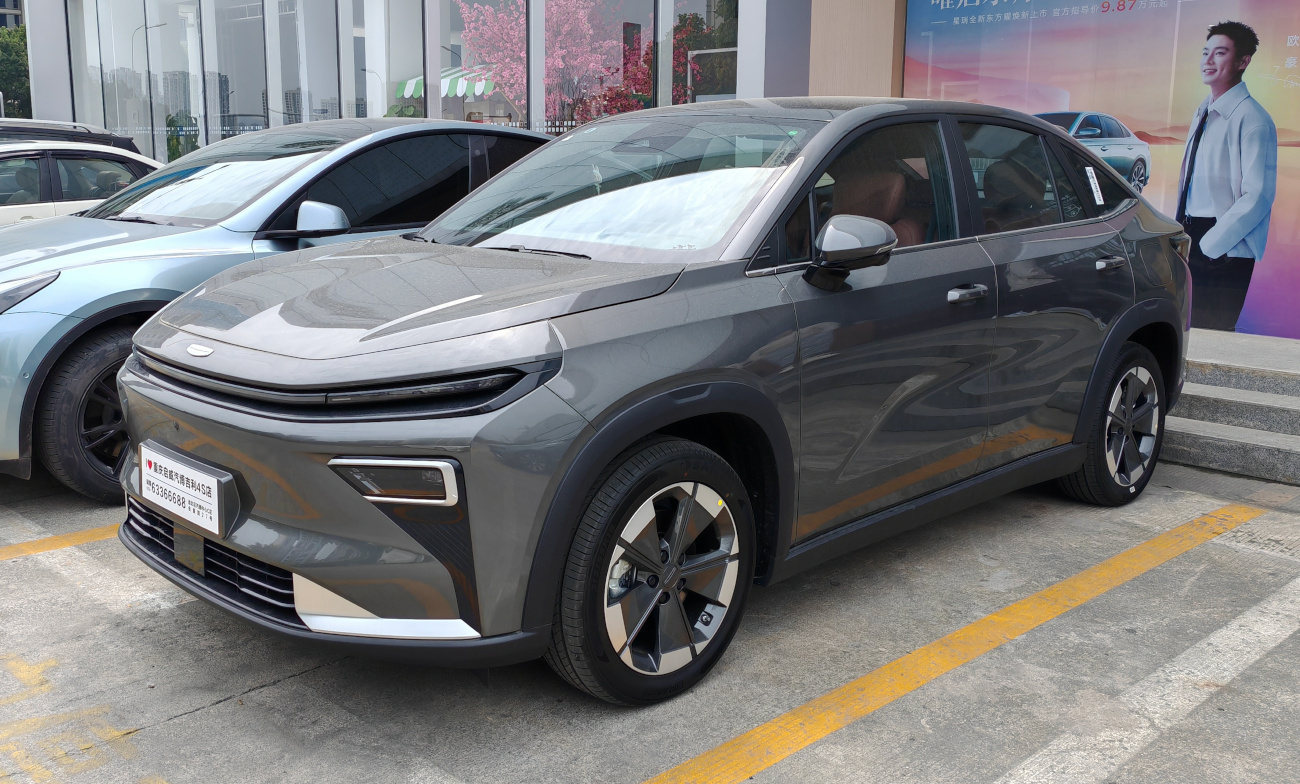
Geely Boyue REV

== See also ==
- SPA – Scalable Product Architecture platform
- GEA – Global Intelligent New Energy Architecture
- CMA – Compact Modular Architecture platform
  - SMA – Scalable Modular Architecture
- BMA – B-segment Modular Architecture platform
