= Livan 7 =

Battery electric compact crossover SUV

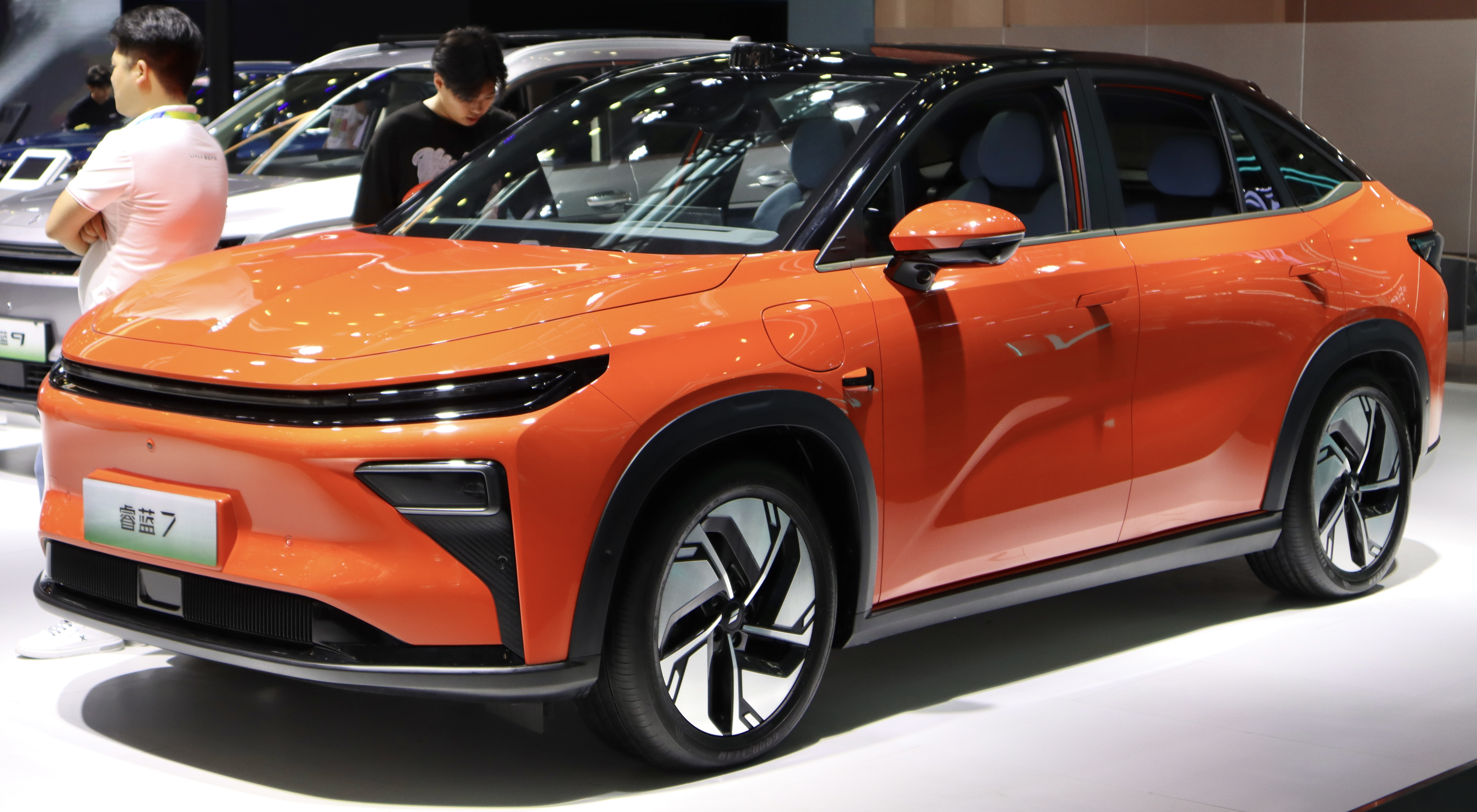
- A Livan 7 at the Greater Bay Area Auto Show in Futian District, Shenzhen City, Guangdong Province, China.

Overview
- Manufacturer: Livan Automotive
- Also called: Maple Cao Cao 60 (ride hailing taxi version); Geely Boyue REV (EREV)
- Production: 2023–present
- Assembly: China

Body and chassis
- Class: Compact crossover SUV (C)
- Body style: 5-door coupe SUV
- Layout: Front-motor, front-wheel-drive; Rear-motor, rear-wheel-drive; Front-engine, front-motor, front-wheel-drive (EREV)
- Platform: GBRC (Global Battery Rapid Change)

Powertrain
- Engine: 1.5 L BHE15-BFN I4 (Generator only)
- Electric motor: Permanent magnet synchronous
- Power output: 160 kW (215 hp; 218 PS) (REEV); 120–180 kW (161–241 hp; 163–245 PS) (EV)
- Hybrid drivetrain: EREV (Geely Boyue REV)
- Battery: REV; 28.3 kWh Aegis Gold brick LFP; 50.4 kWh Aegis Gold brick LFP; EV; 50 kWh LFP Gotion (FWD); 68 kWh NMC Gotion (RWD)
- Electric range: 220–375 km (137–233 mi) (REEV); 450–605 km (280–376 mi) (EV)

Dimensions
- Wheelbase: 2,775 mm (109.3 in)
- Length: 4,690 mm (184.6 in)
- Width: 1,892 mm (74.5 in)
- Height: 1,650 mm (65.0 in)
- Kerb weight: 1,715–1,820 kg (3,781–4,012 lb)

The Livan 7 (Chinese: 睿藍7; pinyin: Ruìlán 7) is a battery electric compact crossover SUV manufactured by Livan Automotive. Since March 2023, a taxi version marketed as the Maple Cao Cao 60 was made for use in Geely-owned ride-hailing service Caocao Mobility. An EREV version is sold as the Geely Boyue REV (Chinese: 吉利博越REV; pinyin: Jílì Bóyuè REV).

== Overview ==
Originally previewed by the Livan RL7 Concept at The 2022 Chongqing Auto Show in June 2022, the Livan 7 is the second product of the renamed Livan brand and sits in the compact crossover coupe space (A-class in China) of the brand's line up.

The Livan 7 rides on the GBRC architecture and has a drag coefficient of 0.238 C_{d}. The base model uses a torsion beam non-independent rear suspension, while other more upmarket models feature a five-link independent suspension. The Livan 7's base model features a single 120 kW (161 hp; 163 PS) front-wheel drive electric motor, while all other higher configurations are equipped with a single 180 kW (241 hp; 245 PS) rear-wheel drive motor. The Livan 7 also offers two range variants including 450 and 605 km (280 and 376 mi) all-electric range versions. The two versions are equipped with a 50 kWh lithium iron phosphate battery pack and a 68 kWh NMC pack, respectively, with both batteries supplied by Guoxuan High-Tech. The Livan 7 also has battery swapping capability, as the battery swapping service is facilitated by Geely's E-ENERGEE platform.

The driving assist systems of the Livan 7 includes a Level 2+ advanced driving assistance system, which has hardware including one lidar, five 4D millimeter-wave radars, 12 ultrasonic radars, and “Geely Future Mobility Constellation” supported satellite positioning. The constellation of Geely consist of 240 satellites, with the first phase of 72 satellites placed in orbit by 2025. The second phase consists of 168 satellites. The computing platform of the Livan 7 is equipped with Geely's self-developed Dragon Eagle-1 automotive-grade 7 nm chip.

The interior features a 15.6-inch central infotainment screen and a 9.2-inch instrument panel behind a two-spoke flat-bottom steering wheel, along with a 50 in (130 cm) AR-HUD.

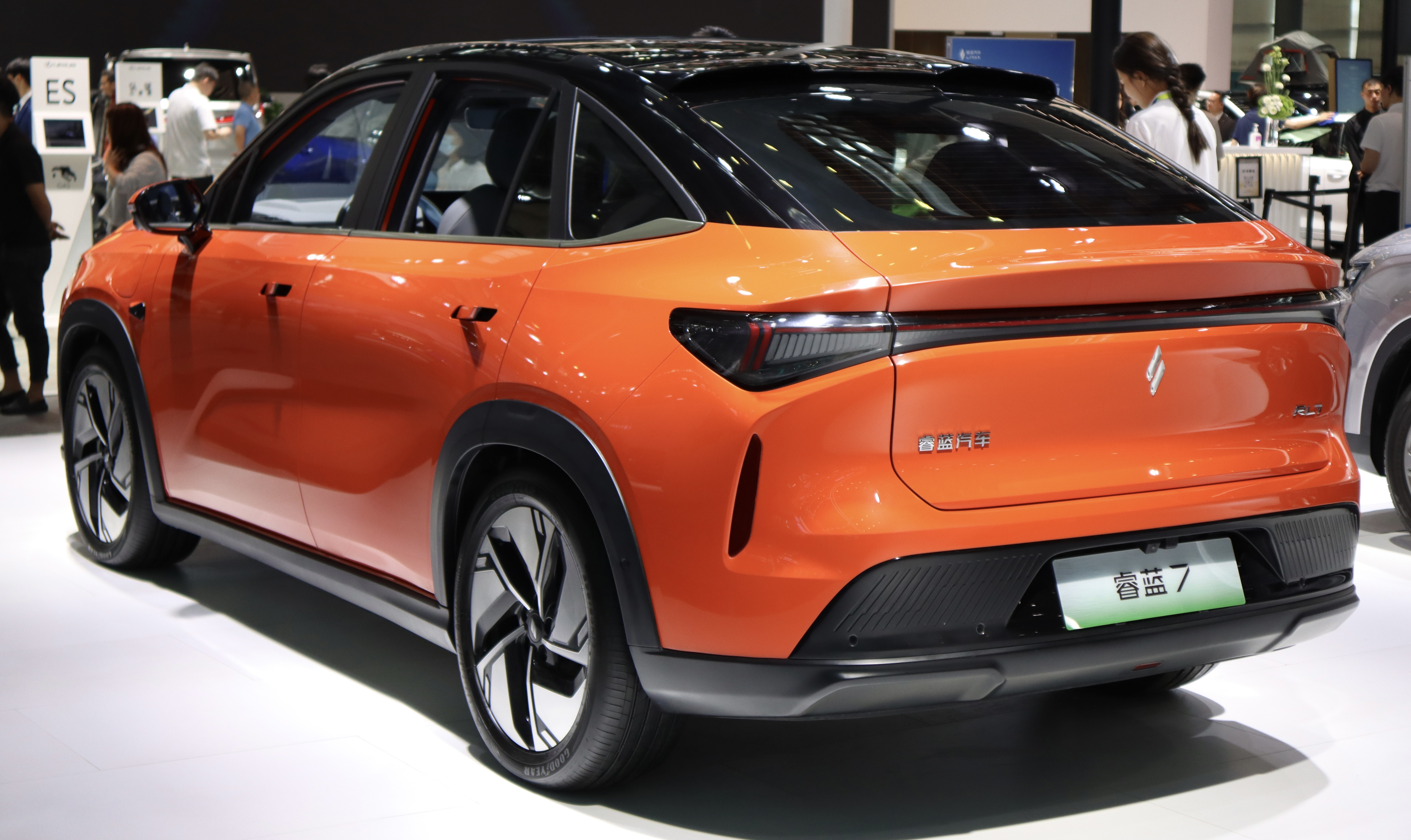
Rear view

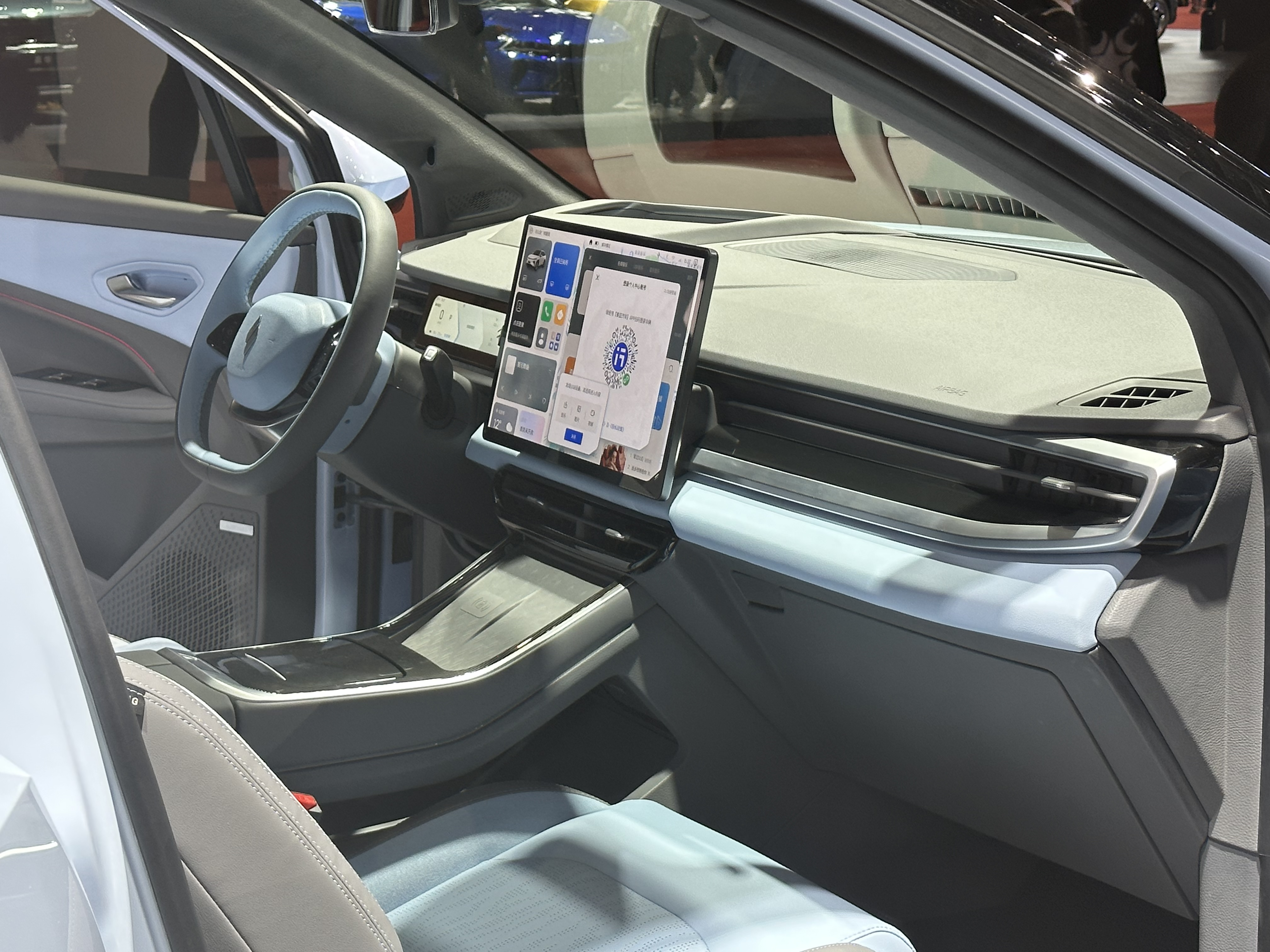
Interior

== Maple Cao Cao 60 ==
The Maple Cao Cao 60 is the ride hailing taxi version of the Livan 7. The Cao Cao 60 was designed for Geely's own ride hailing app, the Caocao Mobility. The Cao Cao 60 is equipped with swappable batteries that support a 415 km (258 mi) CLTC range and is manufactured by Maple.

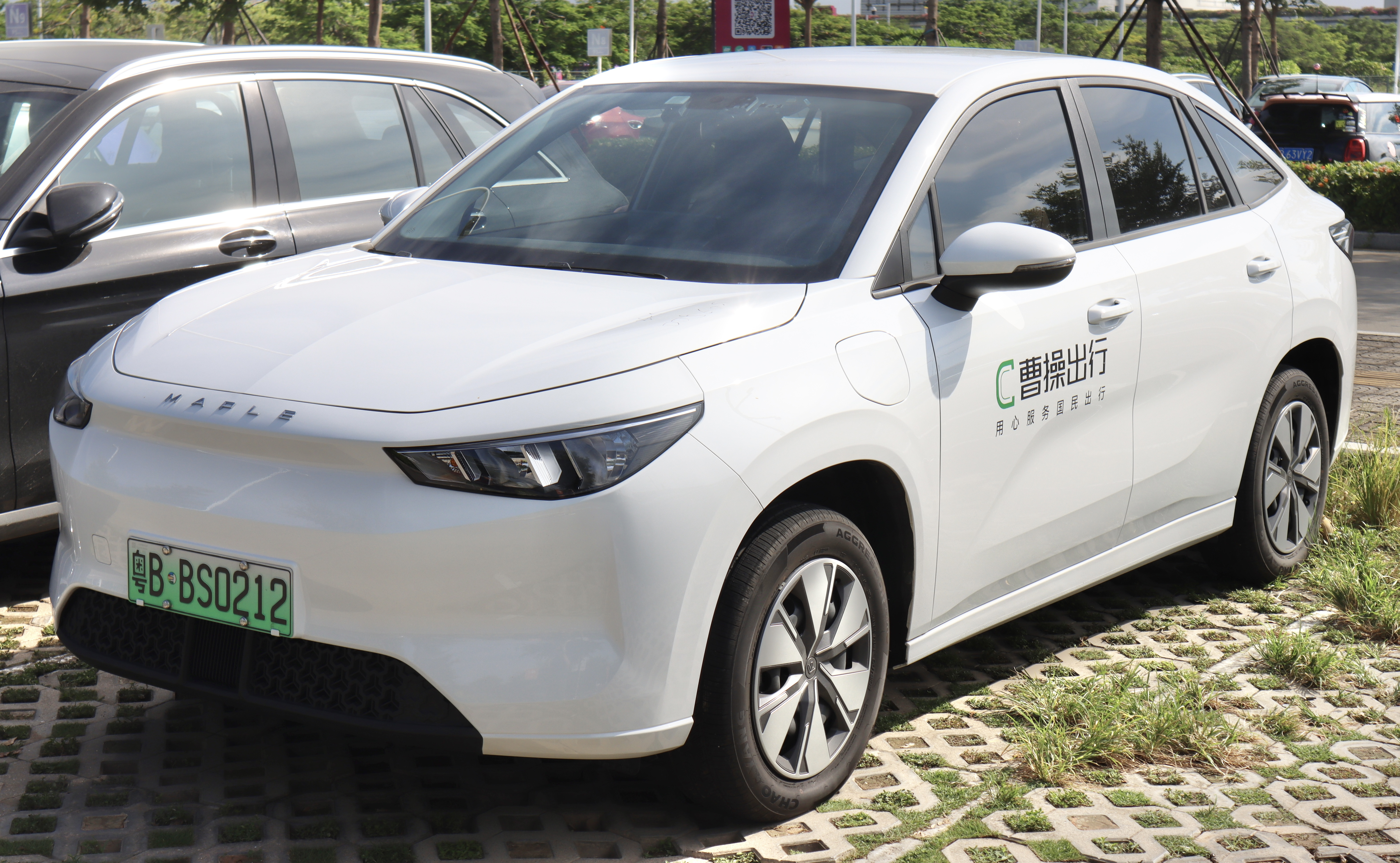
Maple Cao Cao 60

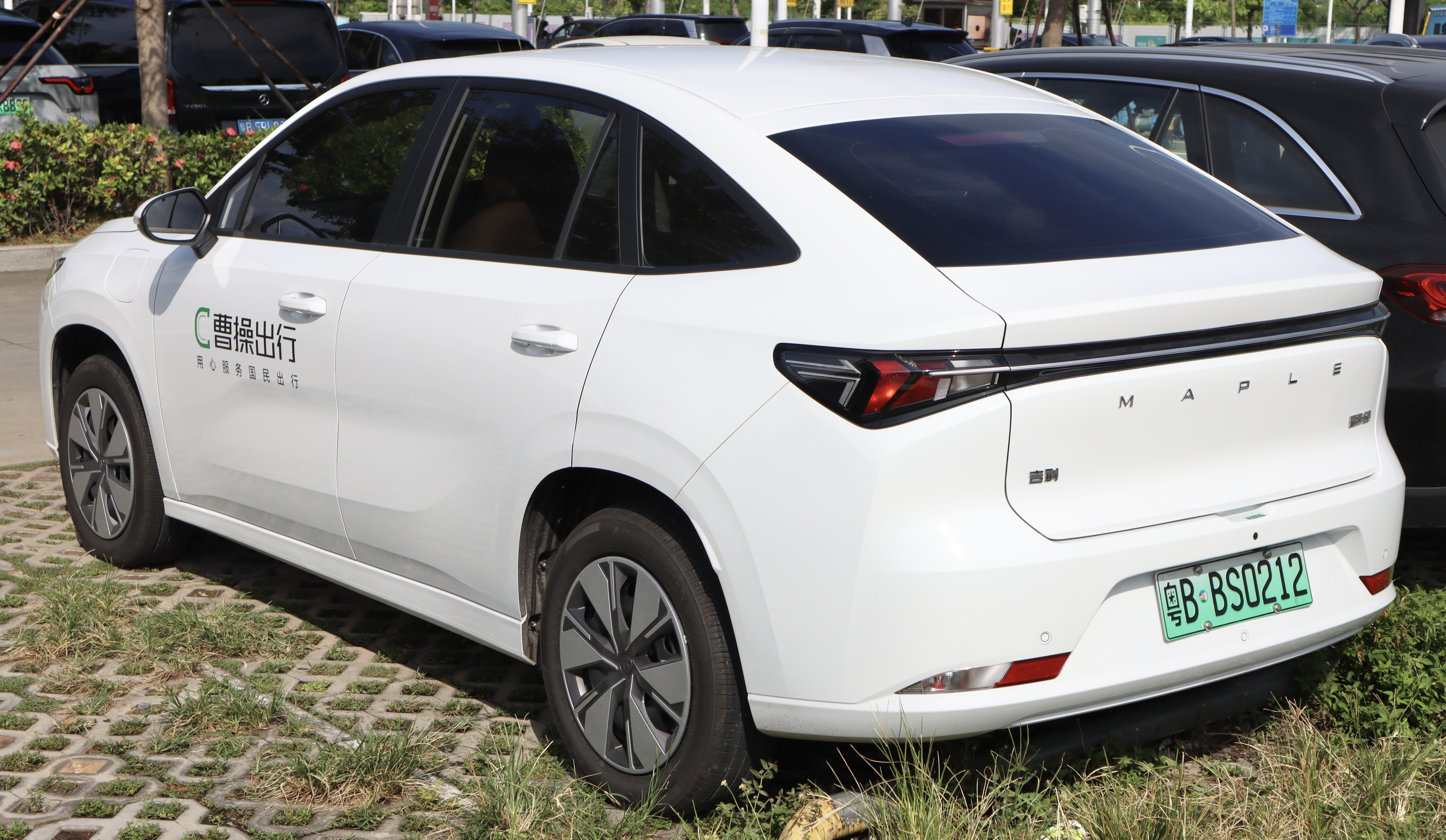
Rear view

== Geely Boyue REV ==
The Geely Boyue REV is the rebadged variant of the range extended Livan 7 and was officially unveiled on February 9, 2026. and sales of the model began on March 31 2026. The Boyue REV was initially introduced as MIIT released photos of the Geely Haoyue R7.

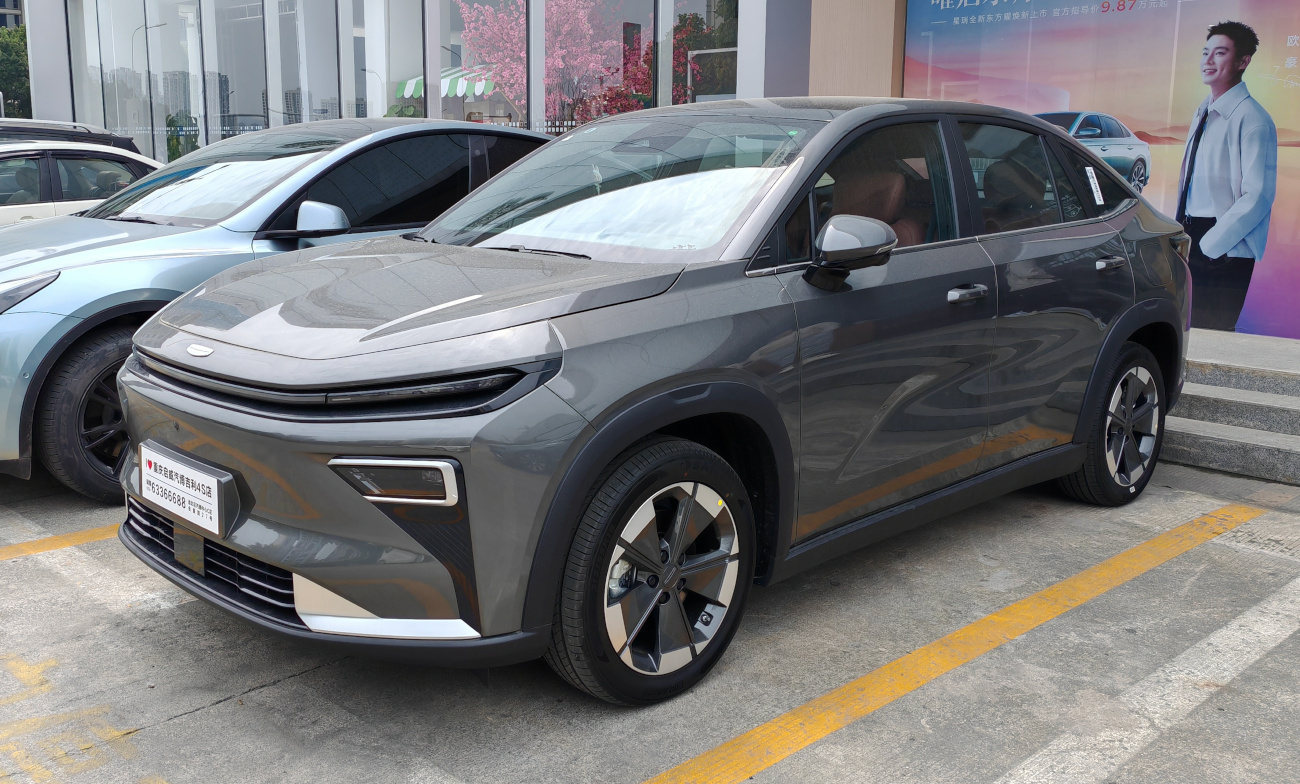
Geely Boyue REV

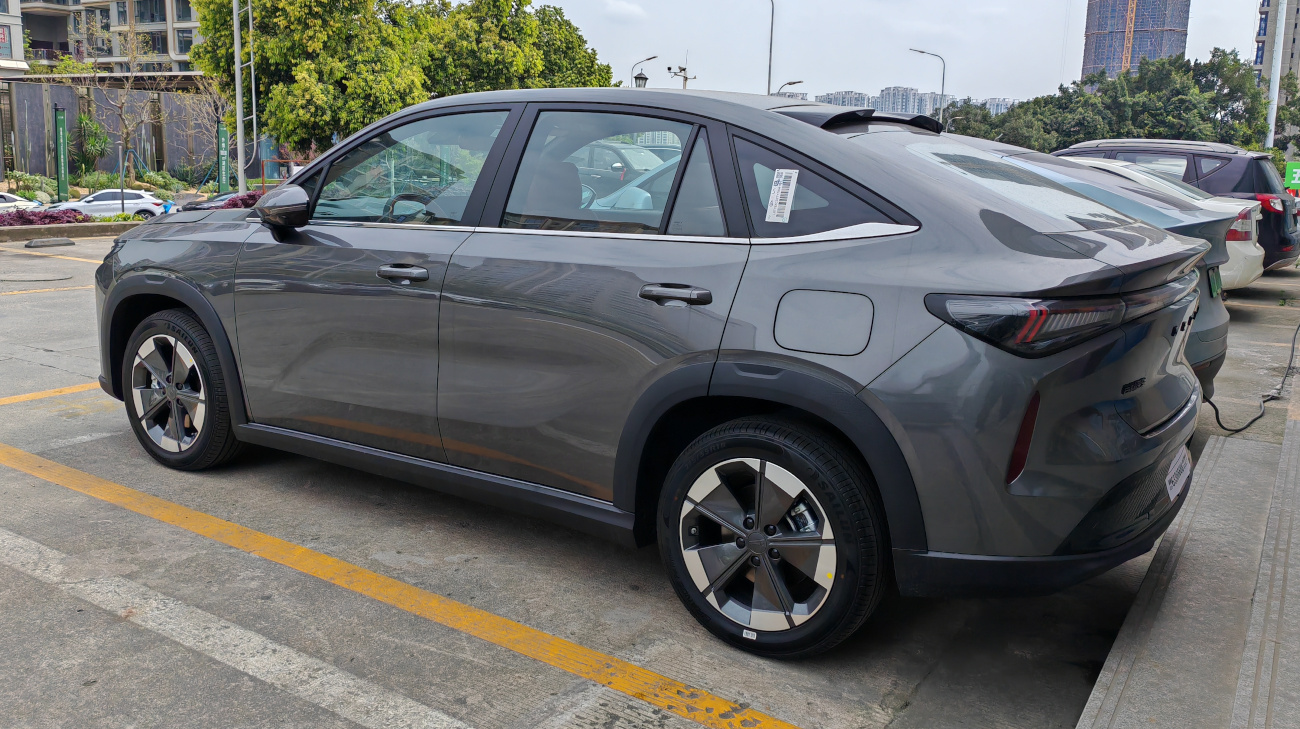
Rear view

== Sales ==
Year	China	
Year	Livan 7	Cao Cao 60
2023	1,551	13,388
2024	4,185	11,669
2025	2,640	16,937
