= List of automobile manufacturers by parent company =

Consolidation of the automobile industry is an ongoing occurrence. Behind each automobile brand lies larger parent corporations. Automobile corporations, external corporations and private shareholders commonly own varying amounts of multiple auto mobile corporations, thus resulting analysis of relationships between auto mobile corporations becomes increasingly complicated. Some of the stakes are represented below.

== Aston Martin ==
- Aston Martin
- Lagonda

== BAIC Group ==
=== Active brands ===
- Arcfox
- BAIC Motor
- BAIC Bluepark
- Beijing Off-road
- Foton
- Ruili Doda
- Stelato

=== Dormant brands ===
- BLAC
- Changhe
- Senova

== Bevan Davidson International ==
- ABC
- Blackburne
- Connaught
- Iso Grifo
- Levis
- Trident
- Villiers

== BMW ==
=== Active brands ===
- BMW
  - Alpina
  - BMW i
  - BMW M
- BMW Brilliance (75%)
  - Zinoro
- BMW Motorrad
- John Cooper Works
- Mini
- Rolls-Royce

=== Dormant brands ===
- Riley
- Triumph

== Bugatti Rimac ==
- Bugatti
- Rimac

== BYD Auto ==
- BYD
- Denza
- Fangchengbao
- Yangwang

== Changan Automobile ==
=== Active brands ===
- Avatr (40.99%)
- Changan Auto
- Changan Ford (50%)
- Changan Mazda (50%)
- Changan Nevo
- Deepal (51%)
- Jiangling Holdings (25%)

=== Dormant brands ===
- Changhe
- Hafei
- Landwind
- Oshan
- Tiger Truck

== Chery ==
=== Active brands ===
- Aiqar
- Chery
- Chery Fulwin
- Chery New Energy
- Exeed
- Exlantix
- Jetour
- Jaecoo
- iCar
- Lepas
- Luxeed
- Karry
- Omoda
- Rely

=== Dormant brands ===
- Riich

== Dongfeng Motor Corporation ==
- Aeolus
- Dongfeng eπ
- Dongfeng Liuzhou Motor
- Dongfeng Motor Group (66.86%)
- Dongfeng Nammi
- Forthing
- M-Hero
- Voyah

== DR Automobiles ==
- Birba
- DR
- EVO
- ICH-X (formerly ICKX)
- Itala
- Katay
- O.S.C.A
- Sportequipe
- Stilnovo
- Tiger Racing

== Eicher Motors ==
- Eicher
- Royal Enfield
- VE Commercial Vehicles (54.4%)

== FAW Group ==
=== Active brands ===
- Bestune
- Hongqi
- FAW Jilin (29.5%)
- FAW Toyota (50%)
  - Ranz
- Jiefang

=== Dormant brands ===
- FAW Tianjin
- Oley

== Ford Motor Company ==
=== Active brands ===
- Ford
  - Raptor
- Lincoln

=== Dormant brands ===
- Comet
- Continental
- Edsel
- Fordson
- Frontenac
- Mercury
- Merkur
- Meteor
- Monarch
- Thames
- Troller

== GAC Group ==
=== Active brands ===
- GAC Aion
- GAC Commercial Vehicle
- GAC Motor
- GAC Toyota (50%)
  - Leahead
- Hyptec
- Trumpchi

=== Dormant brands ===
- Changfeng Motor
- Gonow
- Hycan

== Geely ==
=== Active brands ===
- Farizon Auto
- Geely
- Geely Galaxy
- Jidu Auto (45%)
- Ji Yue (65%)
- Livan
- LEVC
- Lotus (51%)
- Lynk & Co (49%)
- Ouling
- Polestar (22%)
- Proton (49.9%)
- Riddara
- Smart (50%)
- Volvo (78.7%)
- Zeekr (62.8%)

=== Dormant brands ===
- Geely Geometry
- Gleagle
- Emgrand
- Englon
- Zhidou

== General Motors ==
=== Active brands ===
- Buick
- Cadillac
- Chevrolet
- GMC
- Hummer
- SAIC-GM-Wuling (44%)
  - Baojun
  - Wuling

=== Dormant brands ===
- Acadian
- Alpheon
- Asüna
- Beaumont
- Cartercar
- Daewoo
- Elmore
- Envoy
- Geo
- GM Diesel
- Holden
- LaSalle
- Marquette
- McLaughlin
- Oakland
- Oldsmobile
- Passport
- Pontiac
- Rainier
- Ranger
- Rapid
- Reliance
- Saturn
- Scripps-Booth
- Statesman
- Viking
- Welch
- Yellow Cab
- Yellow Coach

== Great Wall Motor ==
=== Active brands ===
- Changzheng
- GWM
- Haval
- Ora
- Poer
- Souo
- Tank
- Wey

=== Dormant brands ===
- Sar Auto

== Honda ==
- Acura
- Honda

== Herpa Miniaturmodelle ==
- Trabant

== Hyundai Motor Group ==
- Genesis
- Hyundai
- Ioniq
- Kia

== Ideal Team Ventures ==
- De Tomaso

== JAC Group ==
- JAC
- JAC Refine
- JAC Yiwei
- Maextro
- Sehol

== Mahindra & Mahindra ==
=== Active brands ===
- Automobili Pininfarina (76.06%)
- Classic Legends Motorcycles
  - BSA
  - Yezdi
- Erkunt Tractor
  - ArmaTrac
- Mahindra Gujarat
- Mahindra Tractors
- Mahindra Truck and Bus Division
- Mitsubishi Mahindra Agricultural Machinery (33.3%)

=== Dormant brands ===
- GenZe
- Mahindra Last Mile Mobility Limited
- Punjab Tractors Ltd.

== Mazda ==
=== Active brands ===
- AutoAlliance Thailand (50%)
- Changan Mazda (50%)
- Mazda
- Mazda North American Operations
- Mazda Toyota Manufacturing USA (50%)

=== Dormant brands ===
- Amati
- Autozam
- ɛ̃fini
- Eunos
- Xedos

== Mercedes-Benz Group ==
- AMG
- Maybach
- Mercedes-Benz
- Smart (50%)

== Mitsubishi ==
- Isuzu (13.6%)
- Mitsubishi Motors (13%)

== NAMI ==
- Aurus Motors
- AvtoVAZ
  - Lada
    - Lada Izhevsk (Formerley IzhAvto)
    - Lada Saint Petersburg
    - VIS-AVTO

== Nio Inc. ==
- Firefly
- Nio
- Onvo

== Nissan ==
=== Active brands ===
- Infiniti
- Nissan
- Renault (15%)

=== Dormant brands ===
- Aichi
- Datsun
- Kurogane
- Ohta Jidosha
- Prince
- Shatai (45.8%)

== Paccar ==
=== Active brands ===
- DAF
- Kenworth
- Leyland Trucks
- Peterbilt
- Tatra (19%)
- VDL Bus and Coach (19%)

=== Dormant brands ===
- Dart
- Foden Trucks

== Pegasus Brands ==
- Bizzarini

== Porsche ==
- Porsche
- VW (31.9%)

== Renault ==
- Alpine
- Dacia
- Mobilize
- Nissan (14%)

== SAIC ==
=== Active brands ===
- Hongyan
- IM Motors (54%)
- Maxus (formerly LDV)
- MG
- Roewe
- SAIC
- SAIC-GM-Wuling (50.1%)
  - Baojun
  - Wuling
- Sunwin
- Yuejin

=== Dormant brands ===
- American Austin
- Austin
- Austin-Healey
- BMC
- Morris
- Princess
- Rising Auto
- Shanghai
- Soyat
- Sterling
- Vanden Plas (outside North America)
- Wolseley

== Seres Group ==
- AITO
- DFSK
- Fengon
- Landian
- Ruichi
- Seres

== Stellantis ==
Formed from merger of Fiat Chrysler with PSA Group in 2020

=== Active brands ===
- Alfa Romeo
- Chrysler
- Citroen
- Dodge
- DS Automobiles
- Fiat
- Fiat Professional
- Jeep
- Lancia
- Maserati
- Opel
- Peugeot
- Ram
- Vauxhall

=== Dormant brands ===
- Ambassador (formerly owned by Hindustan)
- AMC
- Atkinson
- Autobianchi
- Bedford
- Clément-Bayard
- Clément-Talbot
- Commer
- Darracq
- Desoto
- Eagle
- ENASA
- Essex
- Fargo
- Hillman
- Hudson
- Humber
- Imperial
- Innocenti
- Kaiser
- Karrier
- Magirus Deutz
- Nash
- Pegaso
- Plymouth
- Rambler
- Seddon
- Seddon-Atkinson
- SIMCA
- Singer
- Sunbeam
- Sunbeam-Talbot
- Sunbeam-Talbot-Darracq
- Talbot
- Unic
- Wartburg
- Willys-Overland

== Subaru ==
- Subaru (58.59%)
  - Subaru of America

== Suzuki ==
- Jatco (10%)
- Magyar Suzuki
- Maruti Suzuki (56.21%)
- Pak Suzuki Motors (73.09%)
- Suzuki
- Suzuki Indomobil Motor (94.94%)
- Suzuki Motor Gujarat

== Tata ==
=== Active brands ===
- Jaguar Land Rover
  - Bowler Motors
  - Chery Jaguar Land Rover (50%)
  - Jaguar
  - Jaguar Land Rover Slovakia
  - Land Rover
  - Range Rover
- Tata
- Tata Daewoo (formerly Daewoo Commercial Vehicle Co.)
- Tata Hitachi (40%)

=== Dormant brands ===
- Daimler
- Lanchester
- Rover
- Tata Hispano (formerly Hispano Carrocera)
- Vanden Plas (North America only)

== Toyota ==
=== Active brands ===
- Century
- Daihatsu
  - Perodua (20%)
- FAW Toyota (45%)
  - Ranz
- GAC Toyota (50%)
  - Leahead
- Gazoo Racing
- Hino
- Isuzu (5.9%)
- Lexus
- Mazda (5.1%)
- Mazda Toyota Manufacturing USA (50%)
- Panasonic (2.8%)
- Subaru (20.42%)
- Suzuki (4.9%)
- Toyota
- Toyota-Astra Motor (50%)
- Toyota Indus
- Toyota Kirloskar Motor
- Toyota Motor Vietnam
- UMW Toyota Motor (49%)
- Yamaha (3.8%)

=== Dormant brands ===
- Scion
- Toyopet
- WiLL

== Volkswagen Group ==
- Audi
  - AUDI
  - Audi Sport
  - Bentley
  - Lamborghini
    - Ducati
    - Italdesign Giugiaro
- Jetta
- Porsche (75%)
- Rivian (16%)
- Scout (formerly owned by International Harvester)
- SEAT
  - Cupra
- Škoda
- TRATON SE (89.7%)
  - MAN Truck & Bus
  - International Motors
  - Scania
  - Volkswagen Truck & Bus
- Volkswagen
- XPeng (4.95%)

=== Dormant brands ===
- Auto Union
- DKW
- Horch
- NSU
- Wanderer

== Volvo Group ==
- Mack Trucks
- Renault Trucks
  - Arquus
    - ACMAT
    - Panhard
- VE Commercial Vehicles (50%)
- Volvo Busses
  - Nova Bus
  - Prevost
- Volvo Construction Equipment
  - Terex Trucks
  - SDLG
- Volvo Trucks

== Yulon Motor ==
=== Active brands ===
- CMC
- Foxtron (50%)
- Luxgen

=== Dormant brands ===
- Tobe
