= Mobil 1 =

American brand of synthetic motor oil

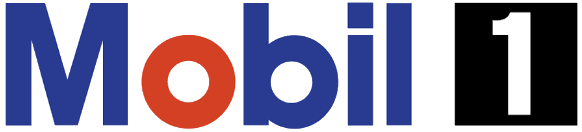

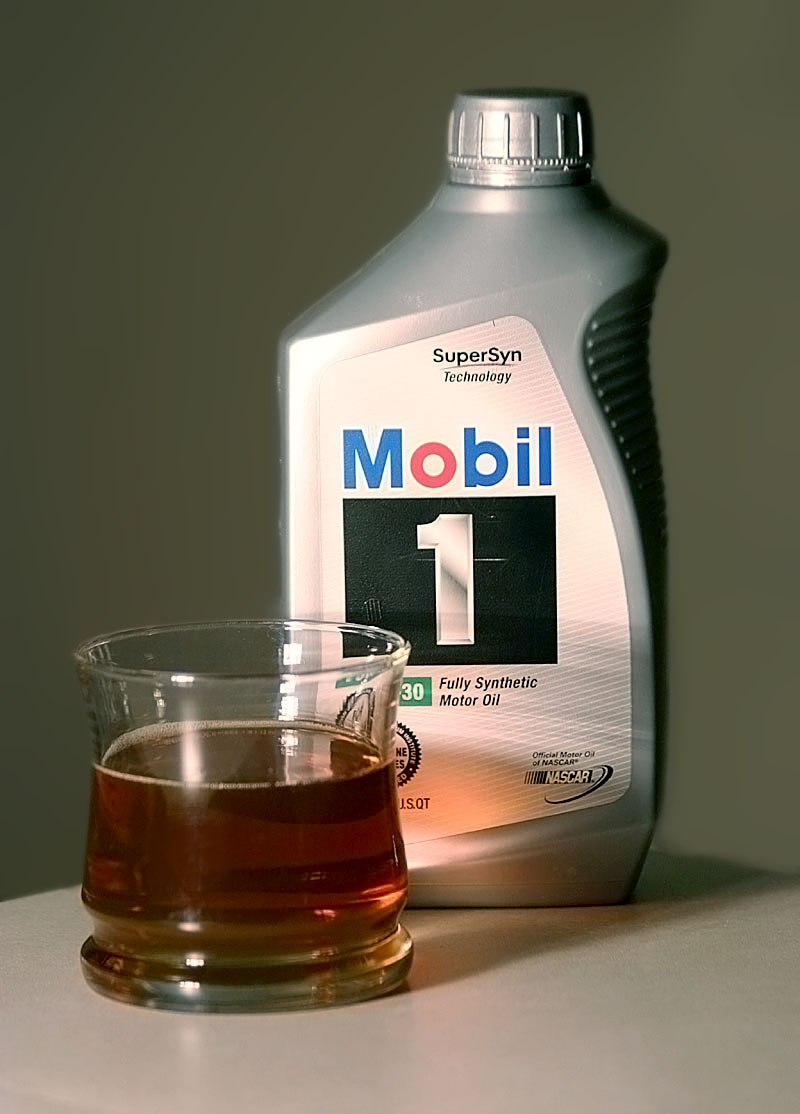
- A bottle of Mobil 1 oil
- Type: Brand
- Industry: Petroleum
- Founded: 1974; 52 years ago in Beaumont, Texas
- Founder: Mobil Oil Corporation
- Headquarters: New York, New York, U.S.
- Area served: Worldwide
- Products: Motor oils
- Total assets: Mobil Oil Corporation
- Owner: ExxonMobil
- Parent: ExxonMobil
- Website: mobil1.com

Mobil 1 is an American brand of synthetic motor oil and other automotive lubrication products. Originally developed by the Mobil Oil Corporation, it is now globally marketed and sold by ExxonMobil.

Mobil 1 engine oil was introduced in 1974. The brand range now includes a variety of engine oils, oil filters, chassis grease, transmission fluids, and gear lubricants.

== Relationship with automobile and motorcycle manufacturers ==
Mobil 1 is an official recommended motor oil for two Volkswagen AG brands: Porsche and Bentley and all General Motors brands (Buick, Cadillac, GMC, Chevrolet (including Corvette), Toyota, Baojun, Wuling Motors and GMSV) for automobiles only.

=== Relationship with Toyota Group ===
Mobil 1's relationship with Toyota Group covering Toyota, Lexus, Daihatsu, Hino Motors, Perodua and Ranz started in 1974 (Perodua from 1993) by providing original motor oil lubricants and other fluid components for all across Toyota Group cars and brands.

All Toyota Group genuine factory-fill motor oils are jointly-developed by Toyota and Mobil 1. All Hino trucks and buses are also utilizing Mobil Delvac 1 lubricants for Hino-powered diesel engines.

== Sponsorships ==
=== Formula One ===
Formula One team Williams had Mobil sponsorship from 1978 to 1988, as well as 2009. In 1987 it switched to Benetton, until 1992. Team Lotus also used Mobil 1 in 1994. From 1995 until 2016, Mobil 1 sponsored McLaren for motor oil and other fluid components. Mobil 1 was also lubricants supplier for Toyota F1 team in 2007 until 2009 when Mobil took over Esso and Exxon lubricants' productions, Brawn GP in 2009 and also Force India in 2009 until 2013. In 2017, Mobil 1 switched to Red Bull Racing and its sister team, Scuderia Toro Rosso, in addition with its successors, Scuderia AlphaTauri and Racing Bulls. As well as sponsoring teams, the brand sponsored the German Grand Prix from 1987 to 2006 and the French Grand Prix from 1998 to 2004.

=== NASCAR ===
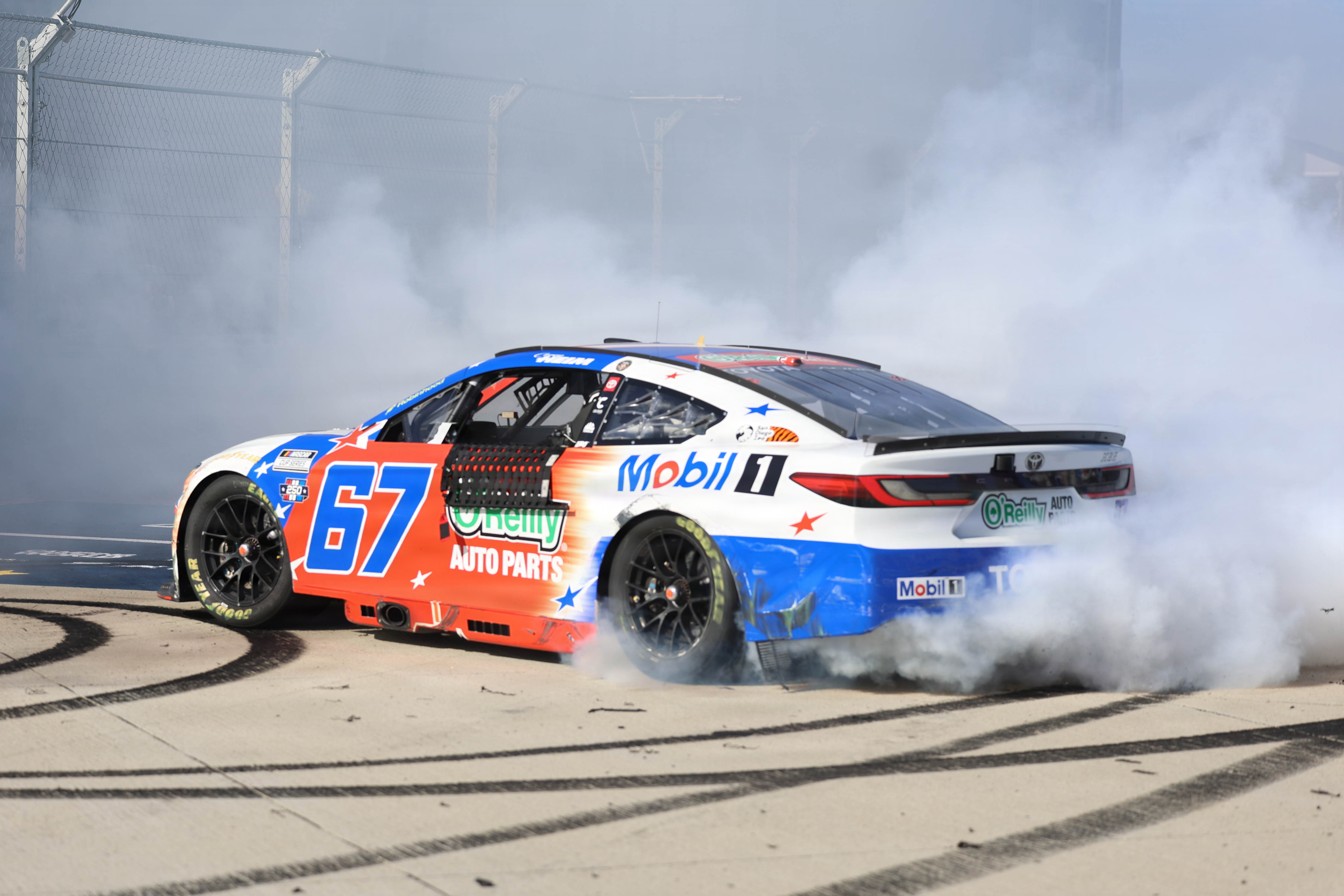
Corey Heim performing a burnout after winning the 2026 Anduril 250 in a Mobil 1 scheme

Since 2003, Mobil 1 has been the official sponsor of NASCAR and sponsors the Command Performance Award, which pays a monetary bonus to the highest-finishing Mobil 1 using team. NASCAR Cup Series driver Rusty Wallace was sponsored by Mobil from 1987. In 1991, he carried his sponsorship to Penske Racing. Jeremy Mayfield had Mobil as the primary sponsorship in 1998, and later Ryan Newman and Sam Hornish Jr. took it as well. Penske's IndyCar operations also had Mobil 1 sponsorship from 1991, until the deal was ended after the 2010 season. Stewart–Haas Racing carried the Mobil 1 sponsorship among its various teams from 2011 until 2024, when the team shut down. Toyota Racing Development-supported NASCAR teams also use Mobil oil since 2011. It currently sponsors race team 23XI Racing. In 2025, Mobil 1 sponsored the Cup Series race at New Hampshire Motor Speedway titled the Mobil 1 301.

=== MotoGP ===
In motorcycle racing, Mobil 1 also provided lubricants for Spanish MotoGP team Pons Racing in the 2002 and 2003 seasons. From 2023 season onwards, Mobil 1 will partner Red Bull KTM Factory Racing MotoGP team as an official lubricant partner and supplier.

=== Australian Touring Car Championship/Supercars ===
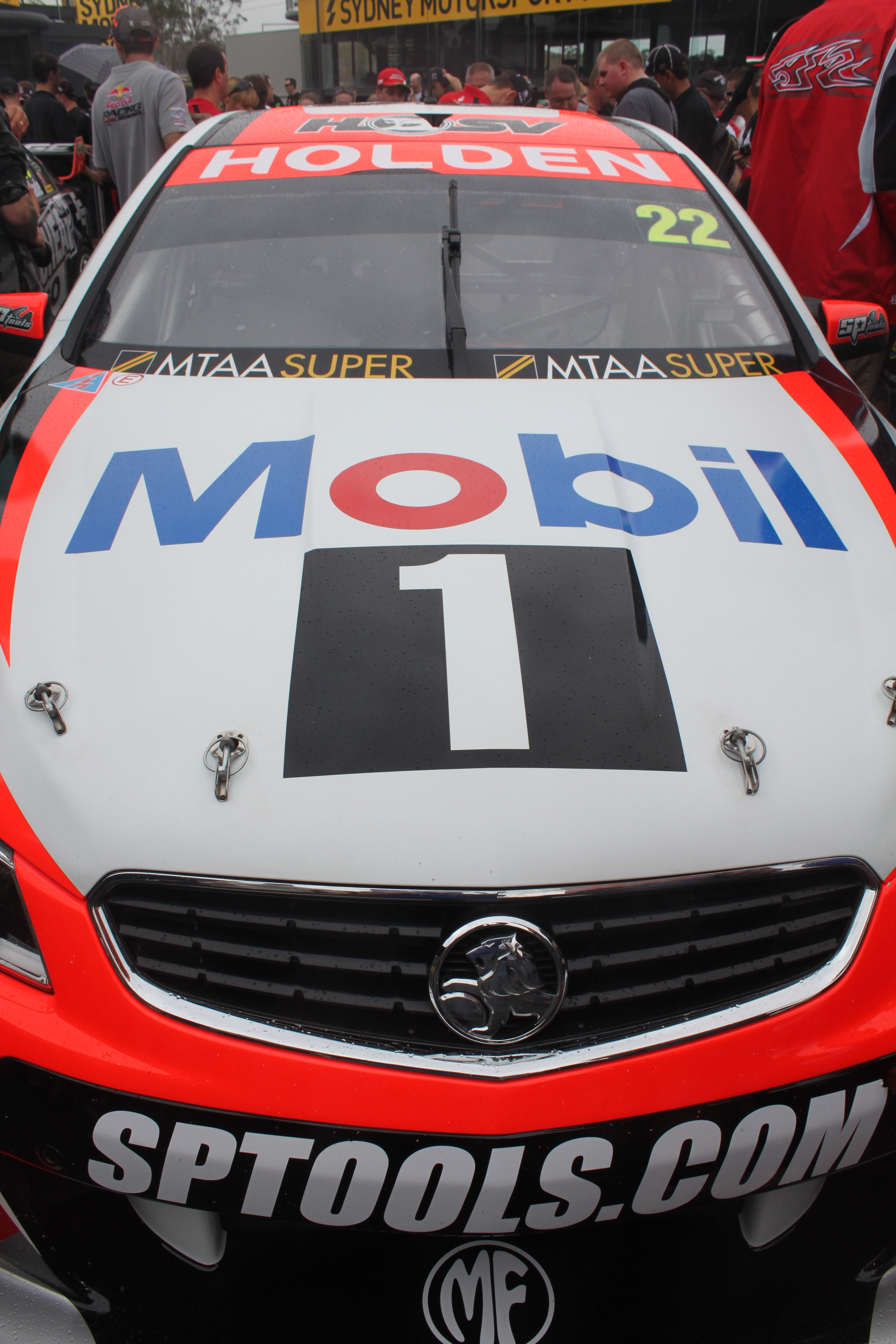
Holden Racing Team Holden Commodore VF of James Courtney in 2015

Mobil, from 1985 to 1993, was title sponsor of Peter Brock's Holden Dealer Team and Advantage Racing that competed in the Australian Touring Car Championship and in the 1986 European Touring Car Championship. Brock, from 1985 until his death in 2006, appeared in advertising for Mobil 1, including an international campaign that ran in the United States in 2000. Since 1994, Mobil has been a sponsor of Supercars team Walkinshaw TWG Racing.

=== Title sponsors ===
Since 2002, it has been the title sponsor of the 12 Hours of Sebring. Since 2008, it has been the title sponsor of the Porsche Supercup.

=== Other ===
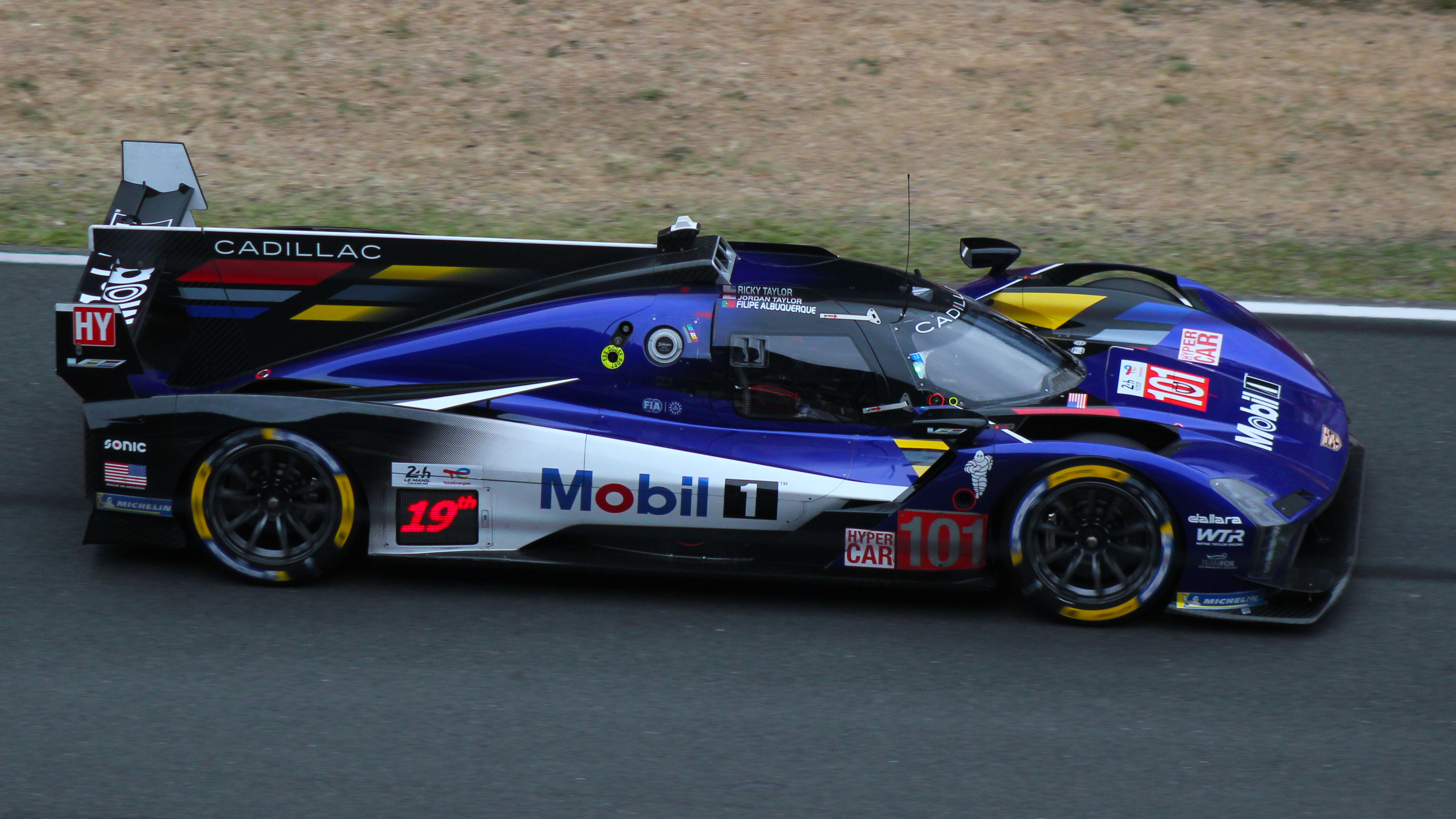
Wayne Taylor Racing's No. 101 car at the 2025 24 Hours of Le Mans

Mobil 1 was the primary sponsor of the #101 Wayne Taylor Racing Cadillac V-Series.R for 2025 24 Hours of Le Mans.

Mobil 1 was a lubricants supplier of DTM team Mercedes-AMG from 1995 until 2010. It supports Porsche and Corvette sports car programs as lubricants provider since 1996. The Bentley Continental GT3 factory cars are also sponsored by Mobil 1 since 2013.

In 2001, Mobil 1 became the primary jersey sponsor of French Ligue 1 football side Sochaux, which was founded and is owned by the Montbéliard-based Peugeot automobile manufacturers. Sochaux has alternated in recent seasons between wearing partner brands Esso and Mobil 1 across the chest of their jerseys, favoring the latter for their 2012-13 Ligue 1 campaign.

Mobil 1 currently providing sponsorship for Lexus-backed 3GT Racing since 2017 season.

Mobil 1 partnered with Gen.G Esports to create Gen.G Mobil 1 Racing ahead of the 2022-23 Rocket League Championship Series (RLCS). The team were the champions of the 2022-23 Fall Major, and have also won five North American regional events since entering the scene. Mobil 1 have also funded the RLCS as a whole, being the title sponsor of the 2021-22 Mobil 1 Mountain Classic in North America.
