= ArmaTrac =

Turkish tractor brand of Erkunt Tractor

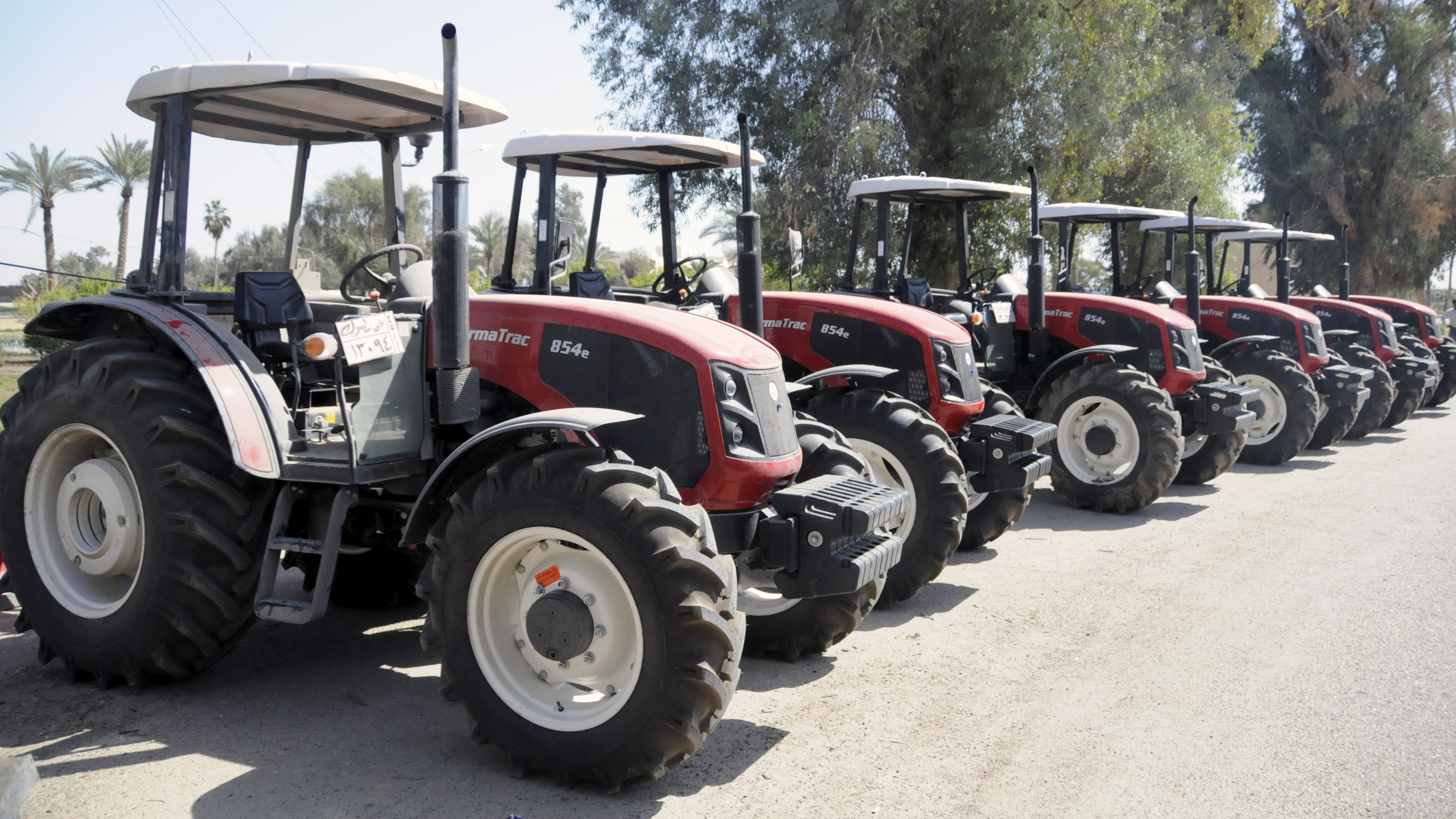
- An ArmaTrac 854e tractor from 2011
- Product type: Tractor
- Current owner: Erkunt Group (Mahindra & Mahindra)
- Produced by: Erkunt Group
- Country: Turkey
- Introduced: 2004; 22 years ago
- Website: armatrac.com

ArmaTrac is the tractor brand of Erkunt Tractor, the tractor division of the Turkish Erkunt group owned by the Indian giant Mahindra & Mahindra.

Erkunt has distributors for the ArmaTrac tractor in Turkey, the United Kingdom, Latvia, Bulgaria, Hungary, Cyprus, Serbia, Poland and Croatia in Europe as well as Yemen, Senegal, Jordan, Algeria in Africa; Antigua and Barbuda in America.

== History ==
The manufacturer company Erkunt, was established in 1953 in Turkey, as a general foundry & pattern shop.

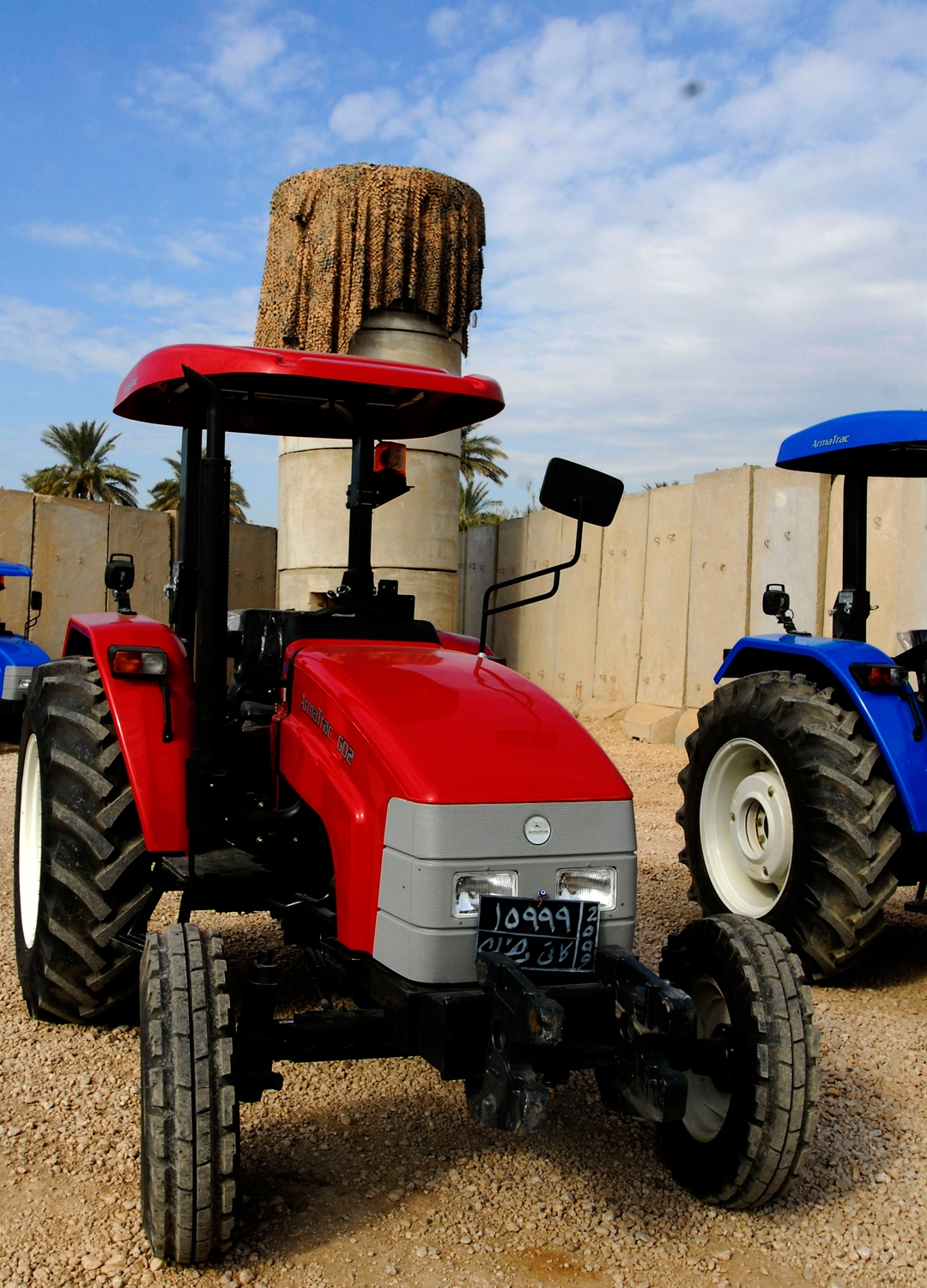
ArmaTrac 602 tractors

In 2003, Erkunt Group started the tractor division with the establishment of Erkunt Tractor Industries, Inc. and became a member of OEM group.

Erkunt Tractor started manufacturing tractors in September 2004. In the following 6 years, 8268 tractors were sold in domestic market through 73 dealers and 105 sales points. The company, which entered the market with only two models, was later able to offer 46 different models between 50 and 110 hp, to potential customers in different countries.

At the end of 2010, Erkunt's market share in Turkey was 18% and it was the second biggest tractor manufacturer in Turkey. Erkunt distributes tractors under ArmaTrac brand in international markets and worked on distributorship basis.

The tractors were designed by Turkish engineers, which was a first in tractor market of Turkey, as most other manufacturers build them under license. The tractors was also be designed for different countries, in order to meet the market's needs. The tractors use ZF and Carraro transmissions built under license by them in Turkey.
