= Ji Yue 07 =

Battery electric executive sedan

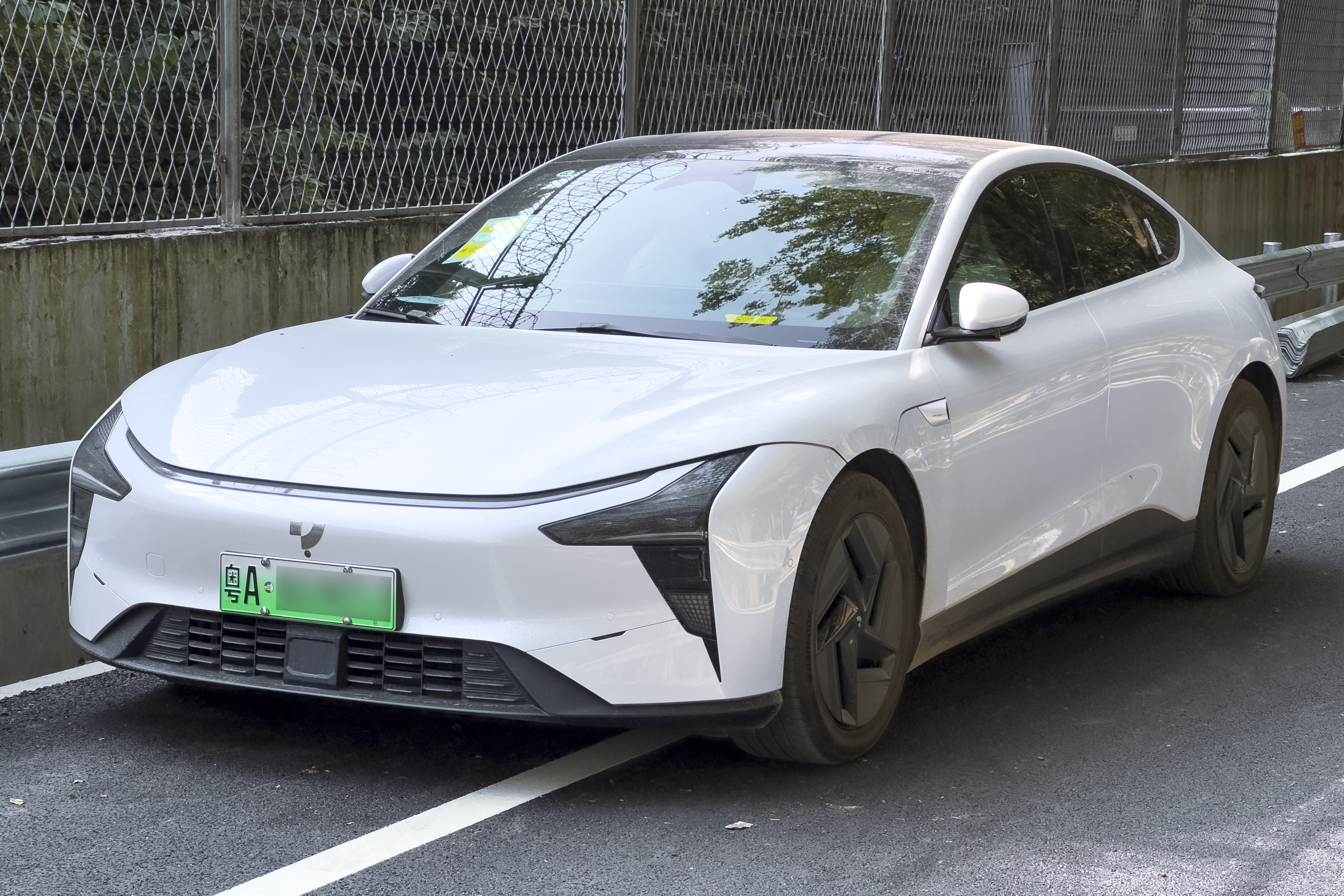

Overview
- Manufacturer: Jidu Auto
- Also called: Jidu Robo-02
- Production: 2024
- Model years: 2025
- Assembly: China: Hangzhou, Zhejiang
- Designer: Frank Wu

Body and chassis
- Class: Executive car (E)
- Body style: 4-door sedan
- Layout: Rear-engine, rear-wheel-drive (07 Max Long-Range); Dual-motor, dual-wheel-drive
- Platform: SEA1 platform
- Related: Ji Yue 01

Powertrain
- Electric motor: 270 hp (274 PS; 201 kW) permanent magnet; 536 hp (543 PS; 400 kW) permanent magnet
- Transmission: 1-speed fixed gear
- Electric range: 880 km (550 mi)

Dimensions
- Wheelbase: 3,013 mm (118.6 in)
- Length: 4,953 mm (195.0 in)
- Width: 1,989 mm (78.3 in)
- Height: 1,475 mm (58.1 in)

The Ji Yue 07 (or Jidu 07) is a high performance electric executive sedan produced by Jidu Auto under the Ji Yue brand.

== History ==
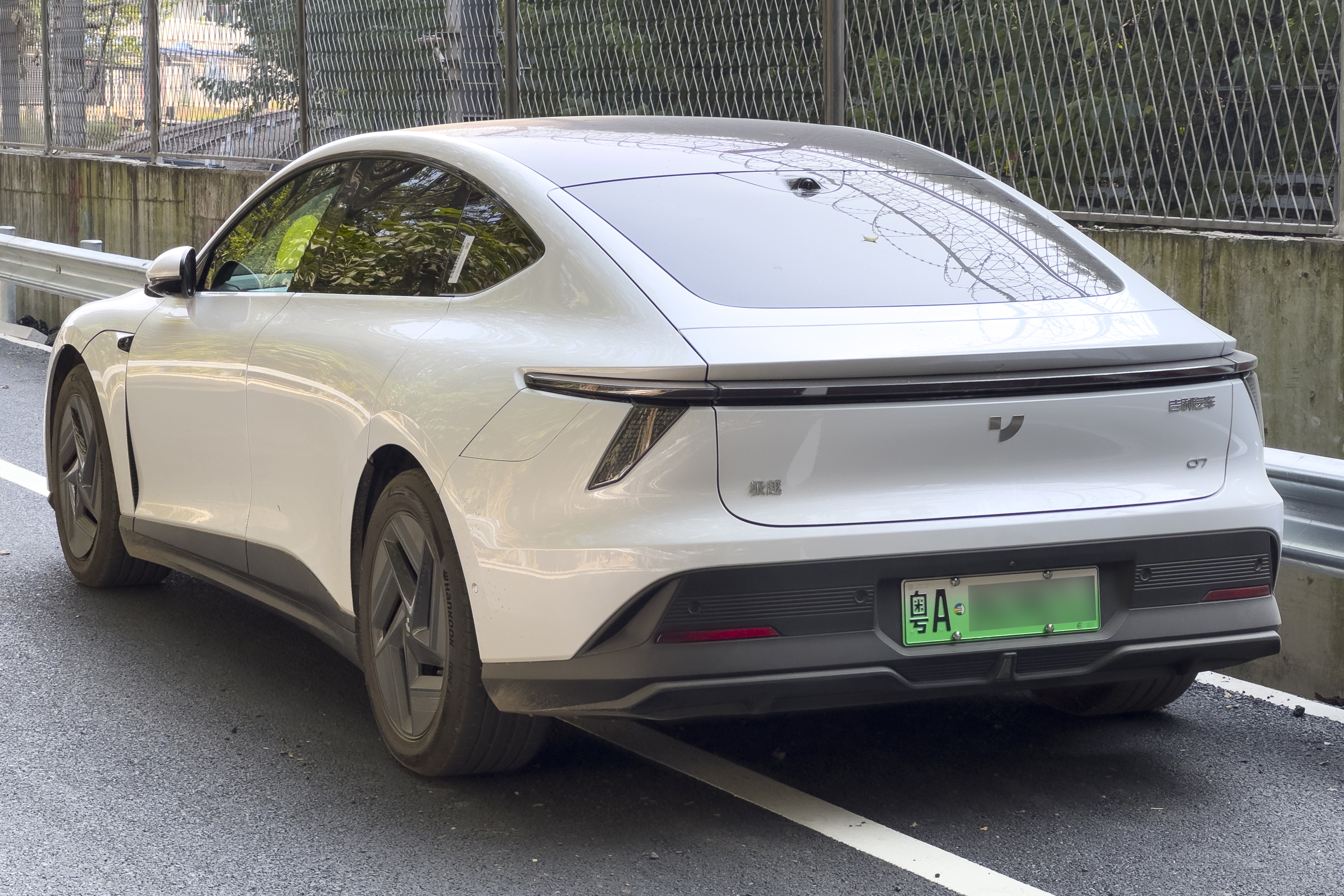
Rear view

For the first time, plans to expand the portfolio of the then Jidu Auto brand were announced at the end of December 2022, as the Jidu Robo-02 prototype close to production form had its premiere. Over the next year, the company changed its brand name to Ji Yue, and the production iteration received a name other than the original Ji Yue 07. The first information about the car was published at the end of December 2023, presenting a large, over 4.95 meter a liftback developing the stylistic language of a crossover Ji Yue 01.

The characteristic visual features of the 07 are a slim, aerodynamic silhouette with sharply shaped headlights enriched with a narrow light strip running across the hood. The gently sloping roofline is topped with a light strip and a retractable spoiler. The car is based on the modular SEA platform of the Geely concern, on which a wide portfolio of models of various brands of the Chinese conglomerate is based.

The passenger cabin uses a minimalist, austere design based on a wide, spacious display dominating the entire dashboard, as well as a steering wheel without the upper rim. The software uses Nvidia technology as well as artificial intelligence solutions.

== Specifications ==
The 07 was created exclusively with electric drive in mind. The basic, rear-wheel drive version has a 268-horsepower engine combined with a 71.4 kWh battery and a range of up to 660 kilometers in the CLTC measurement standard. In addition, it was also possible to choose a larger 100 kWh battery with a range of up to 880 kilometers CLTC. The top specification with AWD drive and a total power of 536 HP only gained a battery with a range of up to 770 kilometers CLTC.

== Sales ==
Year	China
2024	4,013
