= Ji Yue 01 =

Battery electric mid-size crossover SUV

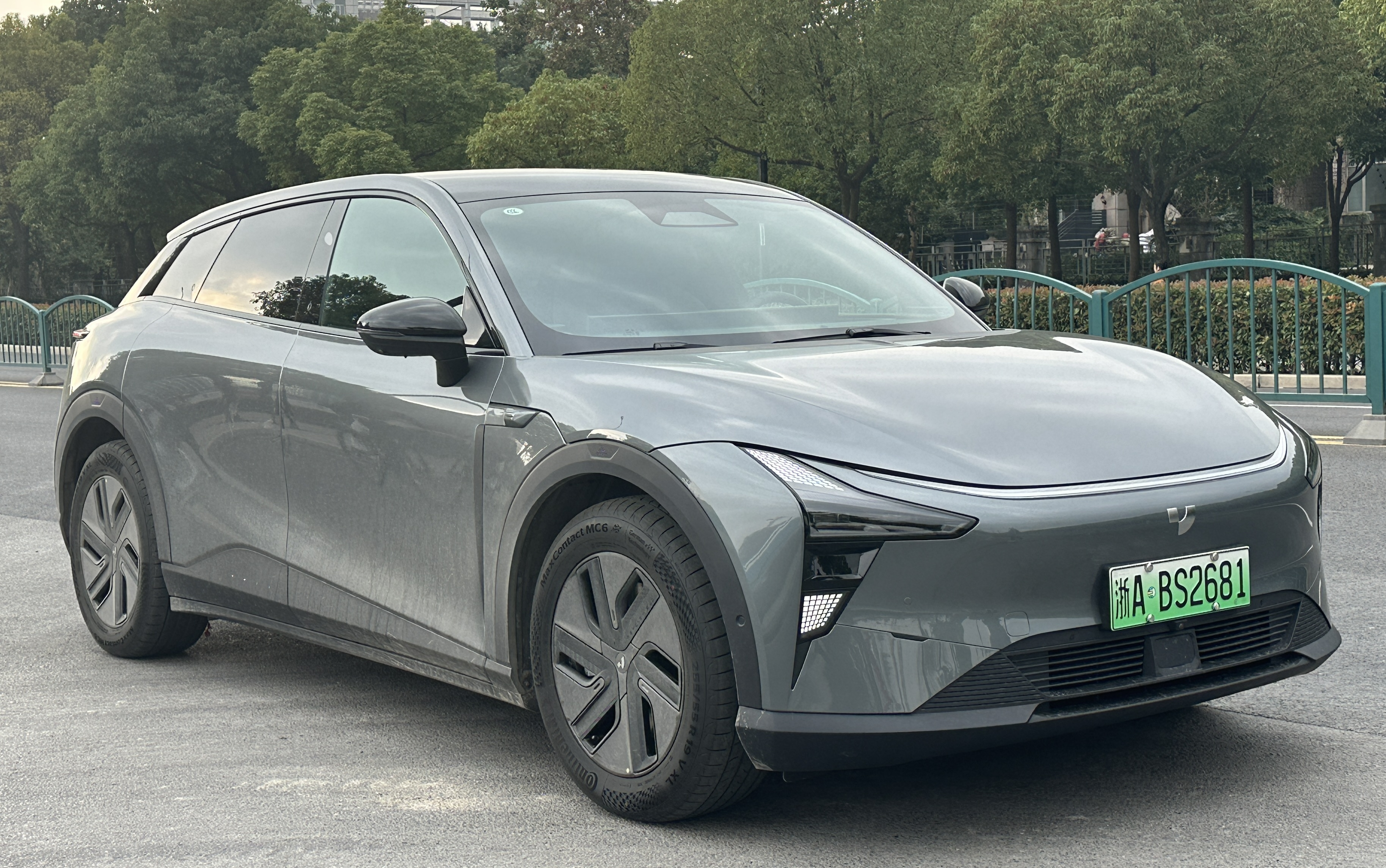

Overview
- Manufacturer: Jidu Auto
- Also called: Jidu Robo-01
- Production: 2023–2024
- Model years: 2024
- Assembly: China: Hangzhou, Zhejiang
- Designer: Frank Wu

Body and chassis
- Class: Mid-size crossover SUV (D)
- Body style: 5-door SUV
- Layout: Rear-engine, rear-wheel-drive (01 Max Long-Range); Dual-motor, dual-wheel-drive
- Platform: SEA1 platform
- Related: Ji Yue 07

Powertrain
- Electric motor: 270 hp (274 PS; 201 kW) permanent magnet; 536 hp (543 PS; 400 kW) permanent magnet
- Transmission: 1-speed fixed gear
- Electric range: 1,000 km (620 mi)

Dimensions
- Wheelbase: 3,000 mm (118.1 in)
- Length: 4,853 mm (191.1 in)
- Width: 1,990 mm (78.3 in)
- Height: 1,611 mm (63.4 in)

The Ji Yue 01 (or Jidu 01) is a high performance mid-size electric crossover SUV produced by Jidu Auto under the Ji Yue brand.

== History ==
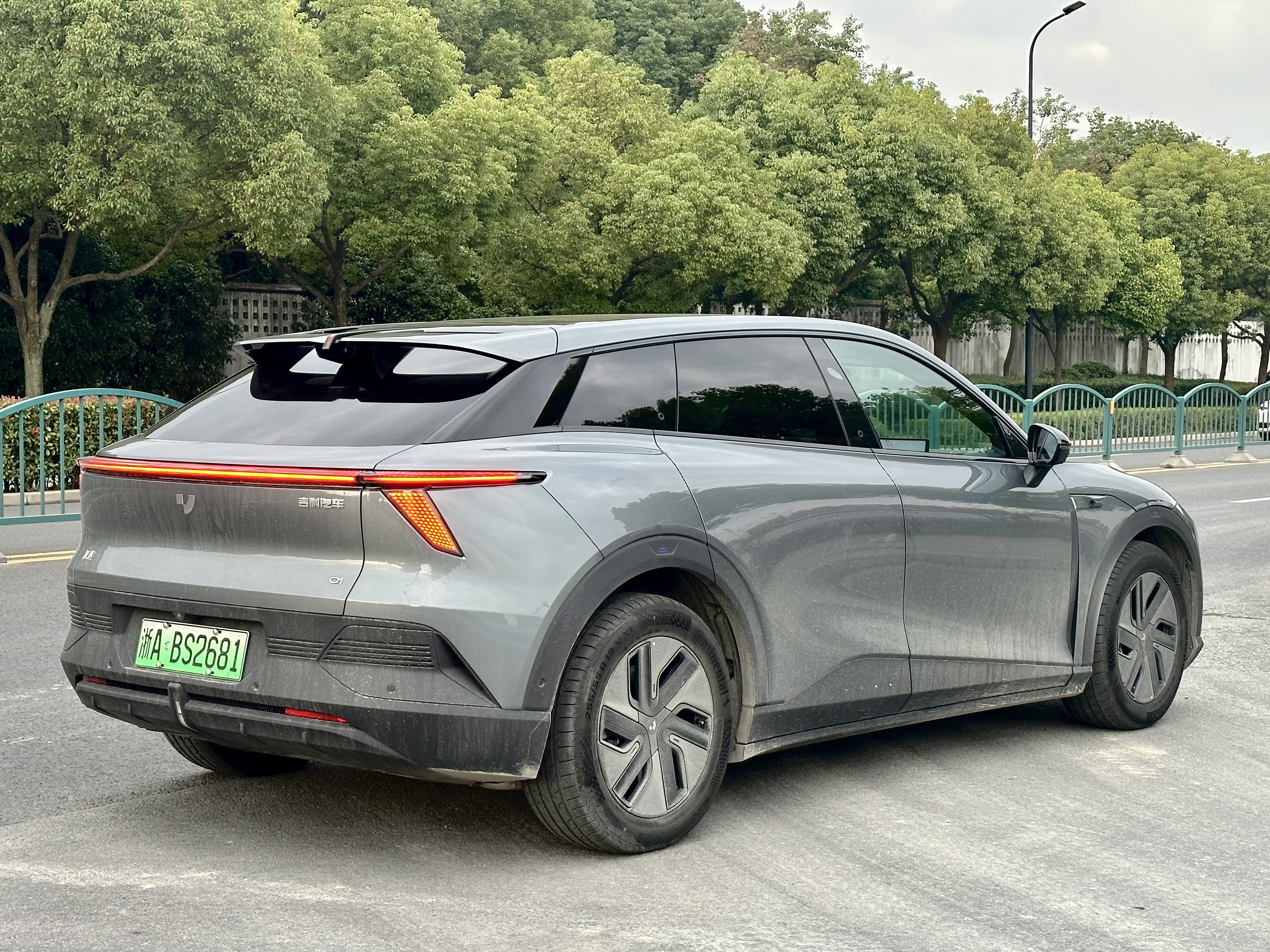
Rear view

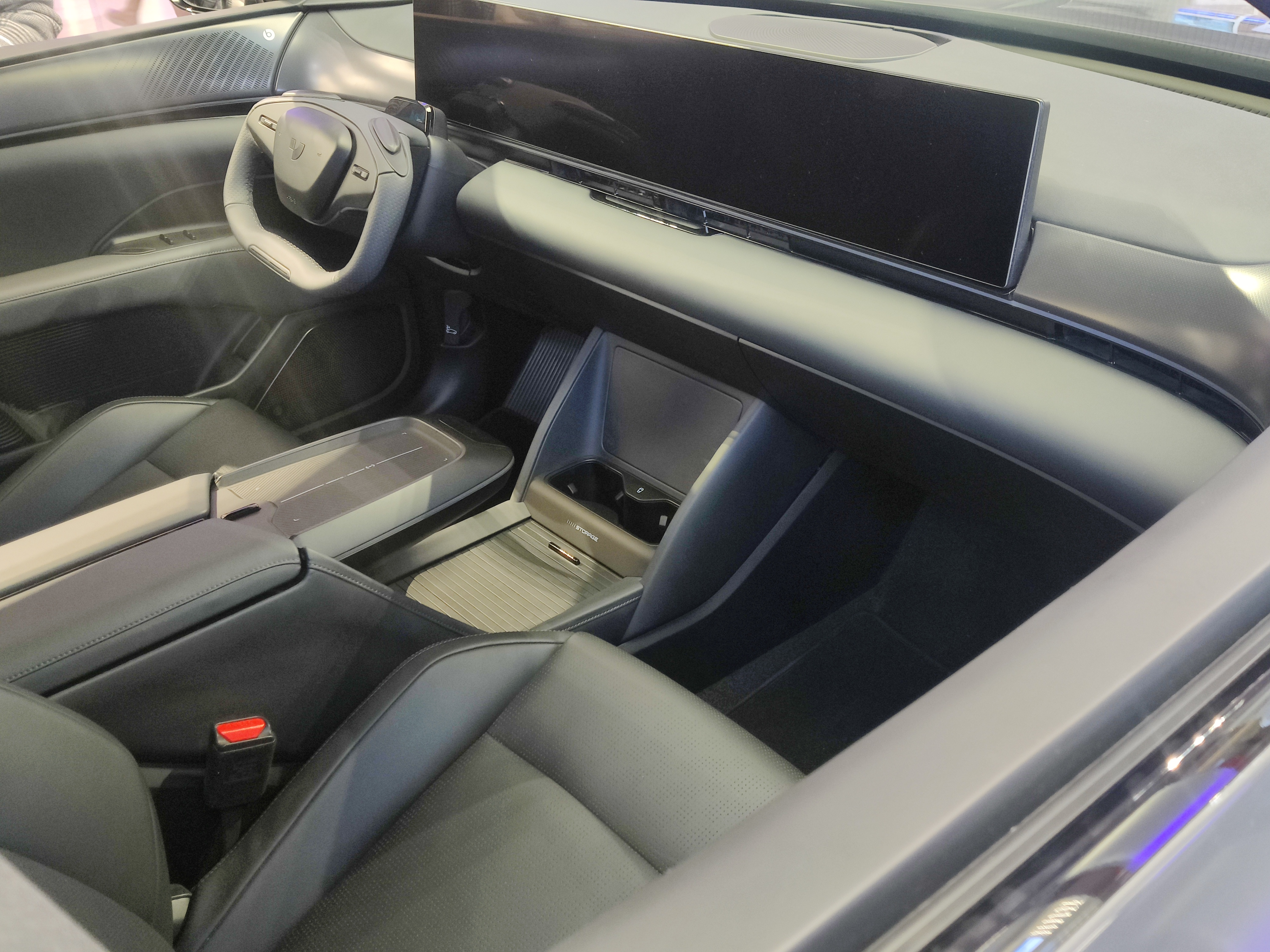
Interior

In September 2021, the newly established joint-venture company Jidu Auto, established on the initiative of Geely and Baidu, presented the first photo of deeply camouflaged prototypes heralding the production model of the Chinese company. The debut of the finished car was preceded by the presentation of the Robo-01 Concept prototype in June 2022, announcing the key features of the vehicle's appearance and the company's plans for the coming years as part of the "Roboday" event. Ultimately, the debut of the model originally called Jidu Robo-01 took place at the end of October 2022. Less than a year later, in August 2023, the car was officially renamed Ji Yue 01.

Visually, the 01 extensively reproduced the features of the prototype that preceded its debut. Both the front fascia and the rear part of the body are decorated with full-width light strips made in Full LED technology, while a slender roofline gently sloping towards the rear, and the number of concavities and recesses is kept to a minimum in favor of flat surfaces. The manufacturer has abandoned traditional door handles in favor of motion sensors, and the doors open unconventionally: the front ones swing up and the rear ones open "against the wind". The futuristic and minimalist passenger cabin was distinguished by the lack of a traditional steering wheel in favor of a steering wheel, while the dashboard, devoid of switches and traditional instrument layout, was created by a large, 35-inch display running across the entire width of the cockpit and displaying images in 3D technology.

The 01 is a technically advanced car that is equipped with the fourth level of semi-autonomous driving and extensive driver support systems while driving. The car is equipped with 8,295 smart chips from Qualcomm, the Orin X chip from Nvidia, 31 external sensors, 12 HD cameras, two LiDAR environmental monitoring radars and an artificial intelligence system.

== Specifications ==
Based on the Sustainable Experience Architecture platform, the 01 is a fully electric vehicle powered by a set of two engines with a total power of 536 hp (543 PS; 400 kW). This allowed the vehicle to accelerate from 0 to 100 km/h (0 to 62 mph) in 3.9 seconds, while the 100 kWh battery pack supplied by the Chinese company CATL, according to the manufacturer's data, allows the vehicle to travel up to 600 kilometres (370 mi) on a single charge. Qualcomm Snapdragon 8295, 35.6-inch 6K UHD screen for driver.

== Safety ==
C-NCAP (2021) test results 2024 Ji Yue 01 Max
Category		%
Overall:	5 /5 stars	89.1%
Occupant protection:		90.37%
Vulnerable road users:		79.83%
Safety assistance:		91.80%

== Sales ==
Year	China
2023	774
2024	9,548
