= Jidu Auto =

Chinese automobile manufacturer

Shanghai Jidu Auto Co., Ltd.
- Type: Private
- Industry: Automotive Technology
- Founded: 2021; 5 years ago
- Headquarters: Shanghai, China
- Key people: Joe Xia (CEO); Gang Luo (COO); Frank Wu (CDO)
- Owner: Baidu (55%); Geely (45%)
- Number of employees: Approx. 4000 (2024)
- Website: www.jidu.com

Jidu Auto is a joint venture premium intelligent EV startup between Chinese tech giant Baidu and car manufacturer Geely. It is headquartered in Shanghai, China. Jidu Auto was founded in March 2021 as a technology AI company that focus on the development of advance intelligence and autonomous electric vehicles.

== History ==
Originally founded in March 2021 with an investment of $300 million, Jidu Auto completed a $400 million Series A financing in January 2022 from Baidu and Geely,

On December 7, 2022, Jidu Auto changed its legal name to Shanghai Mihang Automobile Co., Ltd.

On February 15, 2023, Jidu Auto announced that the firm would use Baidu's self-developed Ernie bot Artificial intelligence in its production cars as the first company to provide an interactive experience with artificial intelligence in production vehicles.

== Relation with Ji Yue brand ==
Ji Yue (极越) brand was established in August 2023, a second company between Geely and Baidu to reconstruct the partnership between the two companies. The Ji Yue brand is 65% owned by Geely and 35% by Baidu which makes Ji Yue brand a subsidiary under Geely Group rather than a joint venture company like Jidu. Due to the Chinese government's policies, Baidu, as the controlling company of Jidu, cannot obtain the qualification to manufacture cars. The purpose of establishing Ji Yue was to make Geely the controlling company in order to sidestep the restriction of car manufacture qualification. Jidu Auto now operates as a technology solution company that focuses on product design, product engineering, as well as development of AI driving and advanced user interface technology for all Ji Yue vehicles.

With the new Ji Yue brand, the previous Jidu Robo-01 was renamed as Ji Yue 01. The Ji Yue brand inherited the brand logo created by Jidu Auto.

== Products ==
Current Ji Yue vehicles are manufactured and assembled at Hangzhou Bay in Ningbo, where Geely's headquarter and several Geely plants are located.

- Ji Yue 01 (2023–2024), mid-size SUV, BEV
- Ji Yue 07 (2024), mid-size sedan, BEV
- Ji Yue Robo X (concept), sport car, BEV
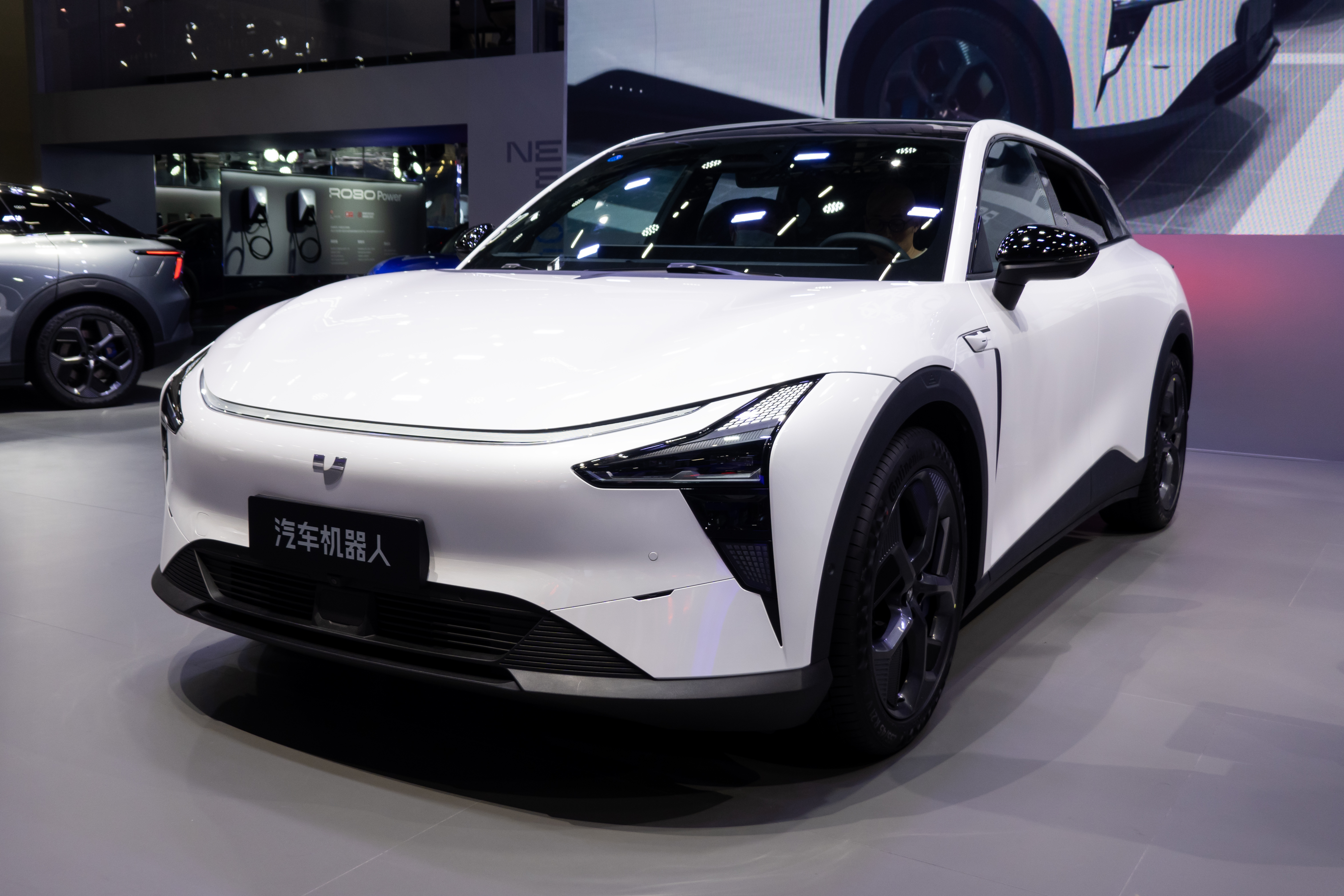
Ji Yue 01

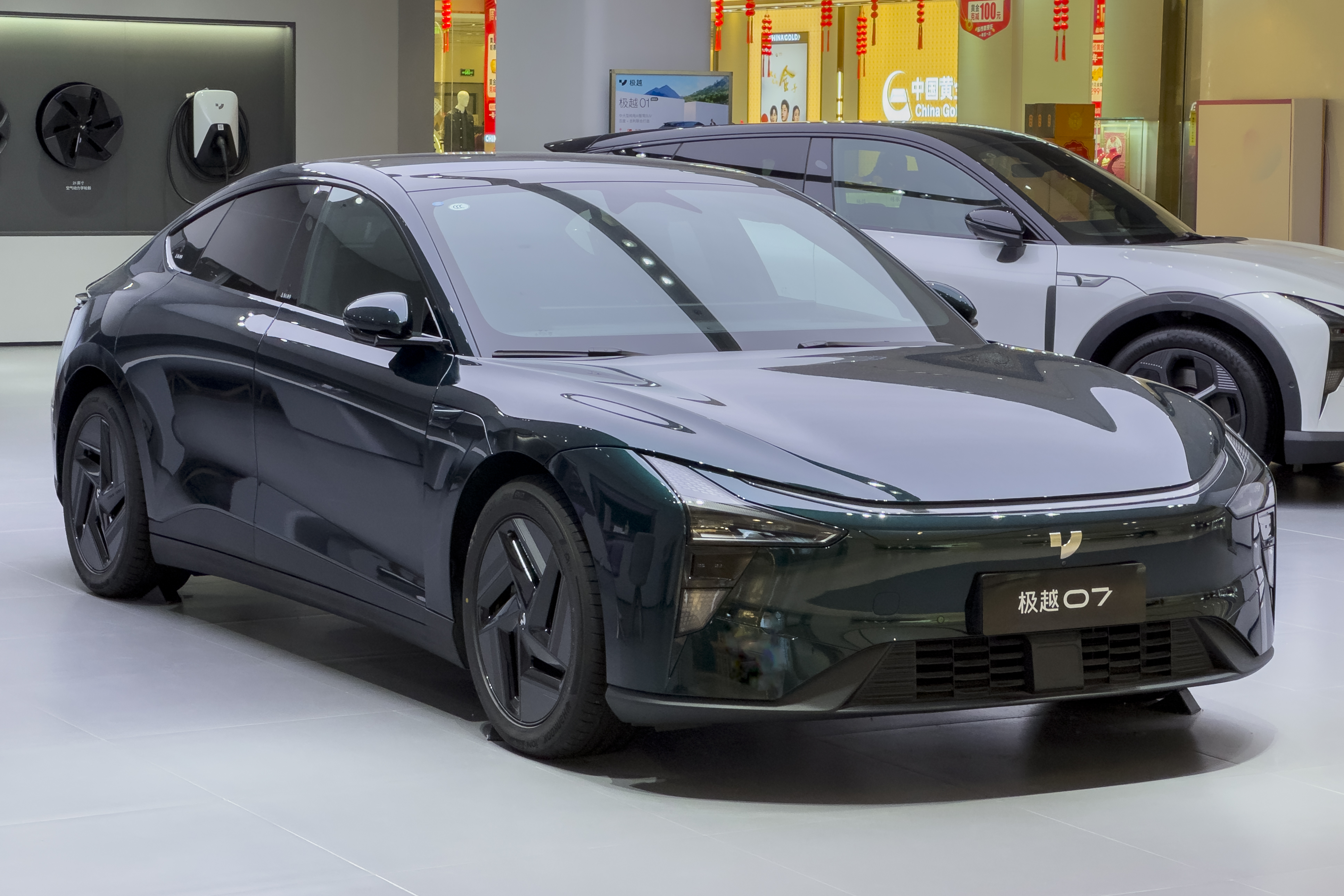
Ji Yue 07

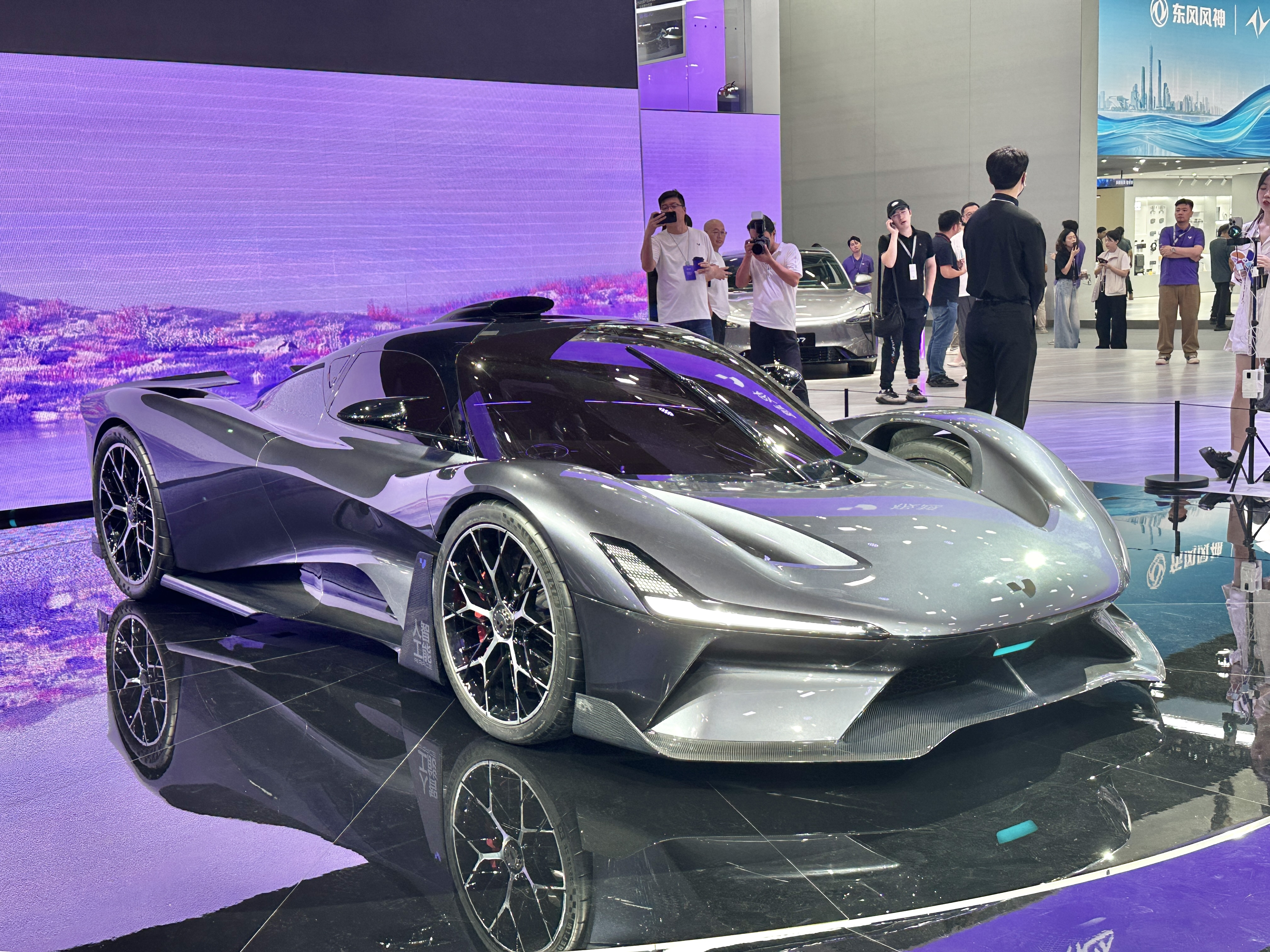
Ji Yue Robo X

== See also ==
- Automobile manufacturers and brands of China
- List of automobile manufacturers of China
