= Ji Yue =

Chinese manufacturer of electric cars

Hangzhou Ji Yue Automobile Technology Co., Ltd.
- Company type: Subsidiary
- Industry: Automotive
- Founded: August 2023; 2 years ago
- Headquarters: Hangzhou, Zhejiang, China
- Area served: China
- Key people: Joe Xia (CEO); Gang Luo (COO); Frank Wu (CDO)
- Products: Automobiles
- Owner: Zhejiang Geely Holding (65%); Baidu (35%)

Chinese name
- Simplified Chinese: 杭州极与越汽车科技有限公司
- Hanyu Pinyin: Hángzhōu Jí yǔ yuè Qìchē Kējì Yǒuxiàn Gōngsī
- Website: jiyue-auto.com

Hangzhou Ji Yue Automobile Technology Co., Ltd., trading as Ji Yue (Chinese: 极越), is a Chinese manufacturer of intelligent electric passenger cars based in Shanghai. It was established in 2023 as a partnership between Geely and Baidu.

== History ==
In April 2021, Baidu, a Chinese technology company, announced a partnership with Geely, a major automaker in China. This collaboration resulted in the formation of Jidu Auto, a joint venture headquartered in Shanghai. The venture received a $7.7 billion investment aimed at developing technologically advanced electric vehicles over the next five years, with plans to employ up to 3,000 people, including 500 software engineers. Jidu Auto's vehicles are intended to feature a robotic theme, emphasizing automation and driver-vehicle interaction.

In September 2021, images of a heavily camouflaged prototype surfaced, hinting at Jidu's first production model. A pre-production prototype was presented in June 2022, followed by the official debut of the Jidu Robo-01, a large electric crossover based on a modular platform from Geely, four months later. Pre-sales for the limited-edition model began in October 2022, with mass production slated for 2023, featuring level four semi-autonomous driving. In late 2022, Jidu Auto showcased a prototype for a new model, a luxury sedan, at the Guangzhou Auto Show.

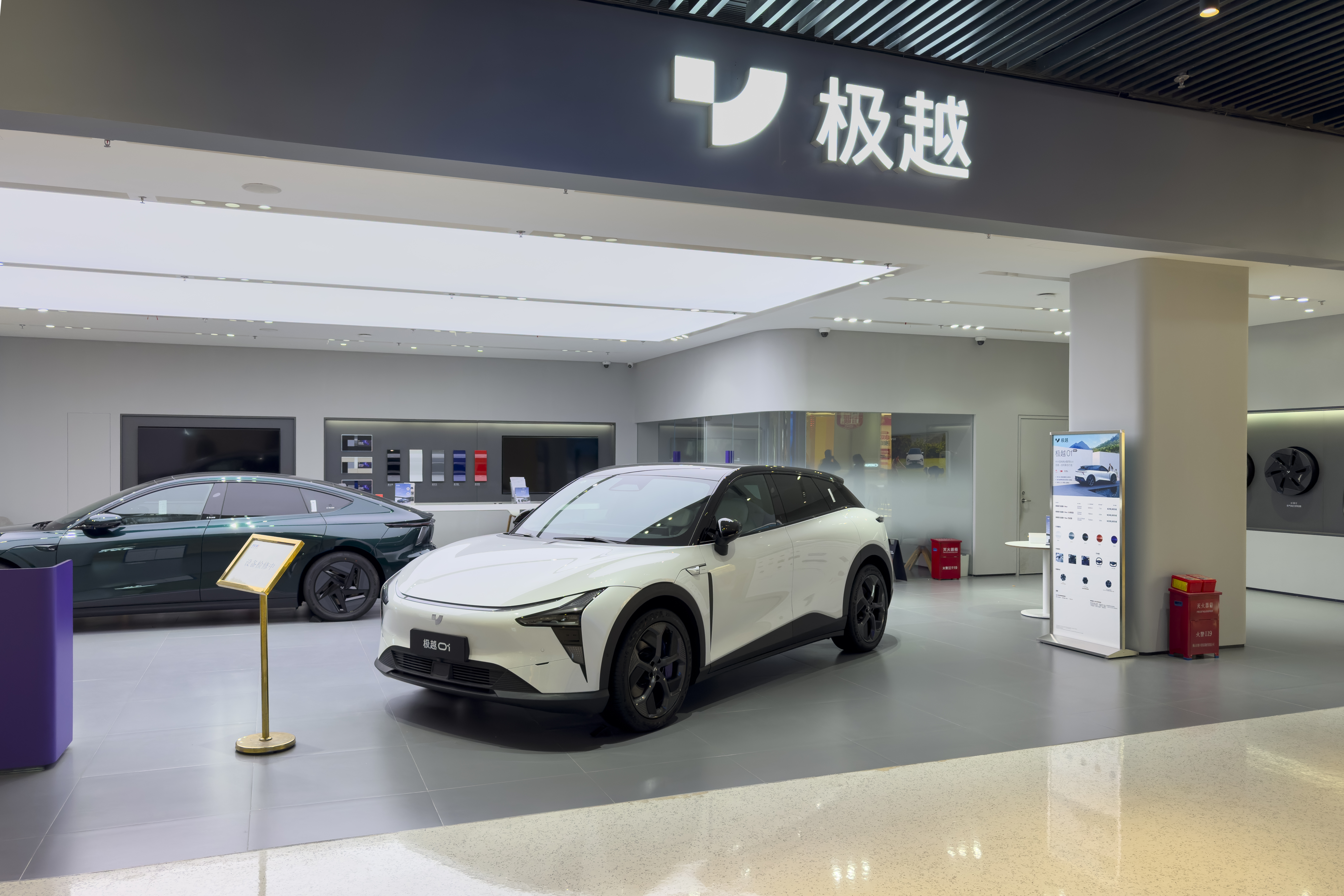
A Ji Yue showroom in Guangzhou

In December 2022, Jidu Auto underwent changes in its shareholder structure and leadership. In the first half of 2023, Ji Yue was formed to circumvent restrictions on car manufacturing qualifications. Jidu Auto now focuses on technology solutions, including product design and AI development, for Ji Yue vehicles. The joint venture ownership shifted to 65% for Geely and 35% for Baidu. The Jidu Robo-01, renamed to Ji Yue 01, was introduced to the Chinese market. In December 2023, the company revealed the production version of the Jidu Robo-02 prototype, named Ji Yue 07, a large luxury sedan set for market release in April 2024.

In December 2024, Ji Yue announced a reorganization and downsizing in order to streamline operations and seek additional funding in the face of fierce market competition.

== Products ==
Ji Yue vehicles are manufactured and assembled at Hangzhou Bay in Ningbo, where Geely's headquarter and several Geely plants are located.

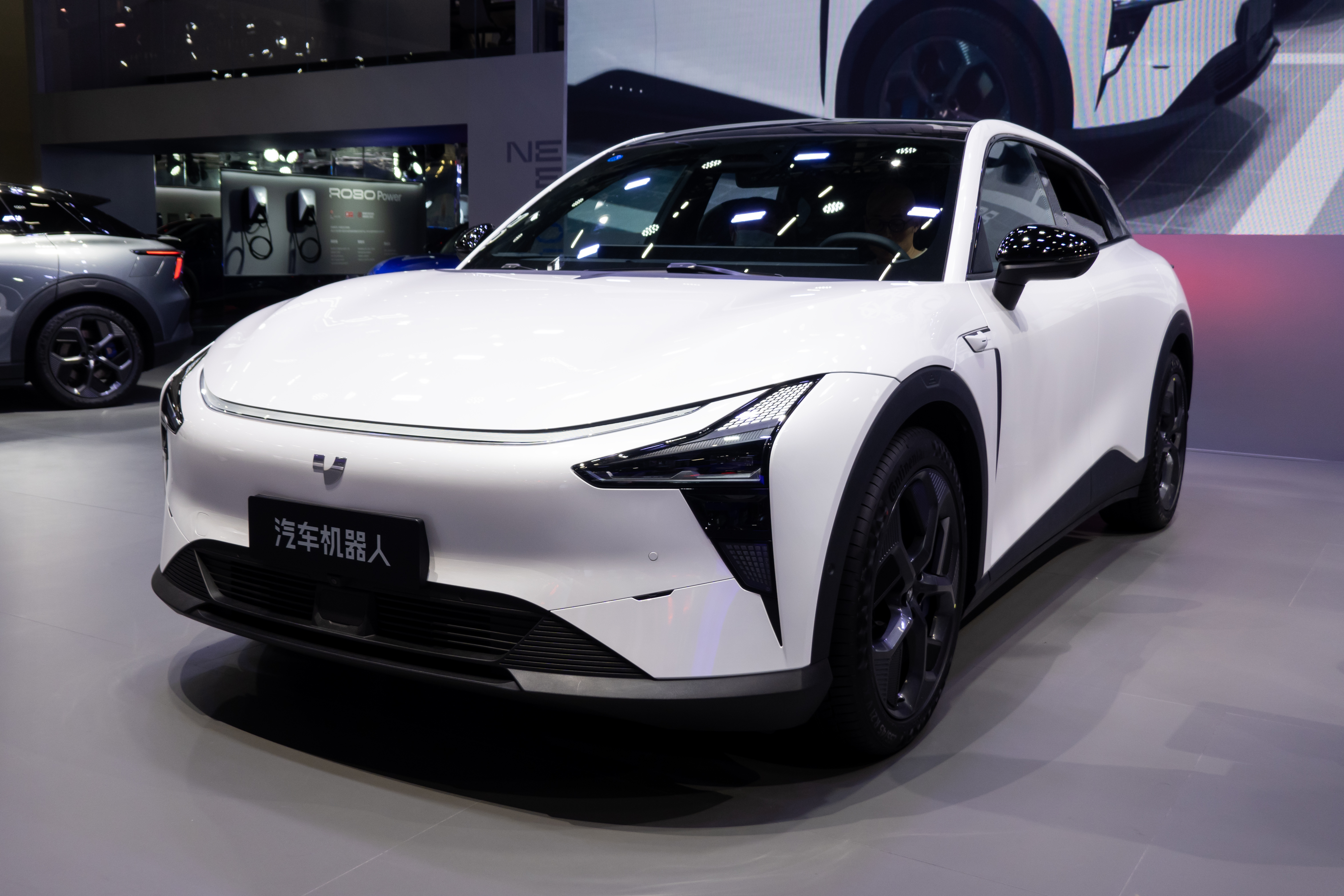
Ji Yue 01 (2023–2024), mid-size SUV, BEV

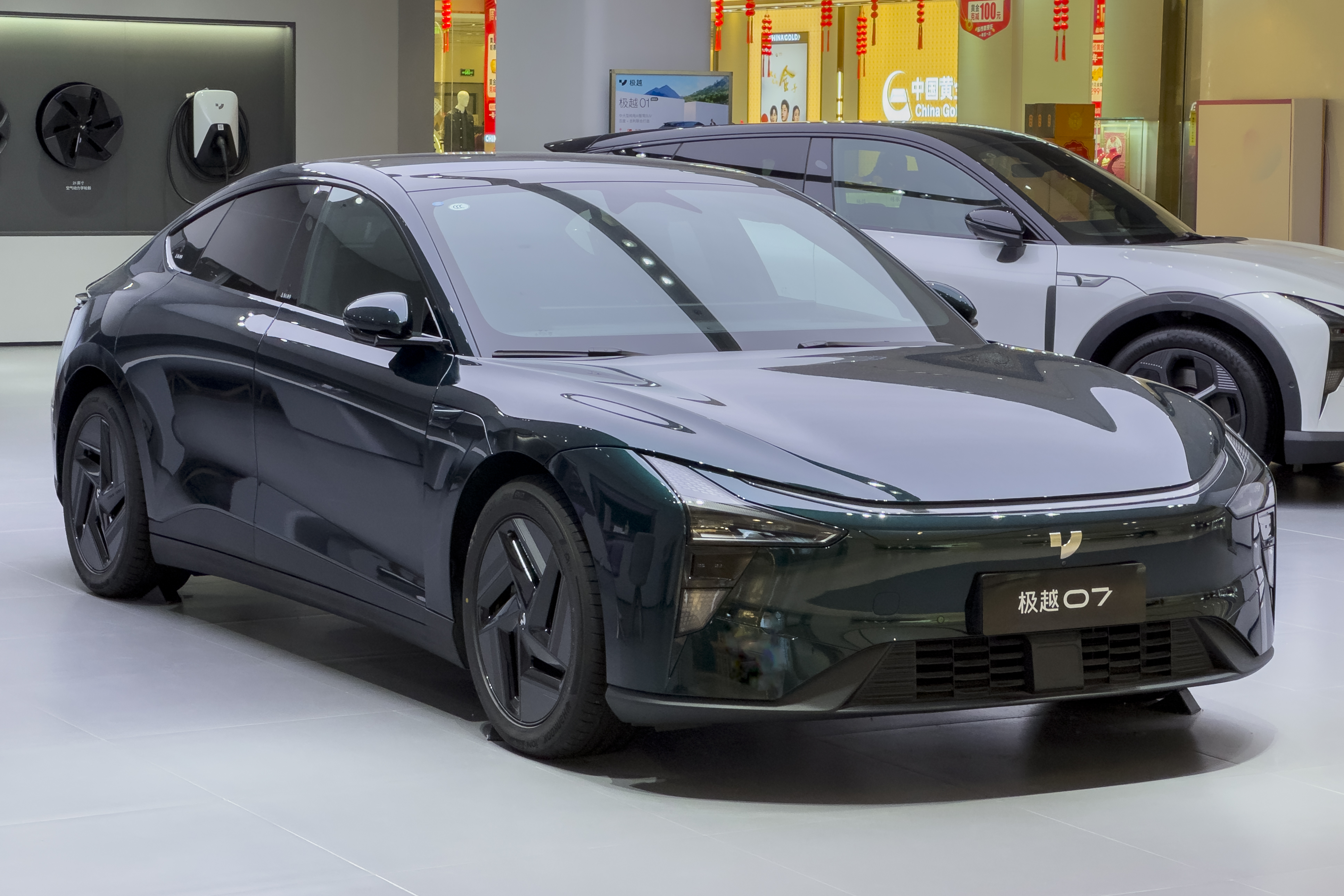
Ji Yue 07 (2024), mid-size sedan, BEV

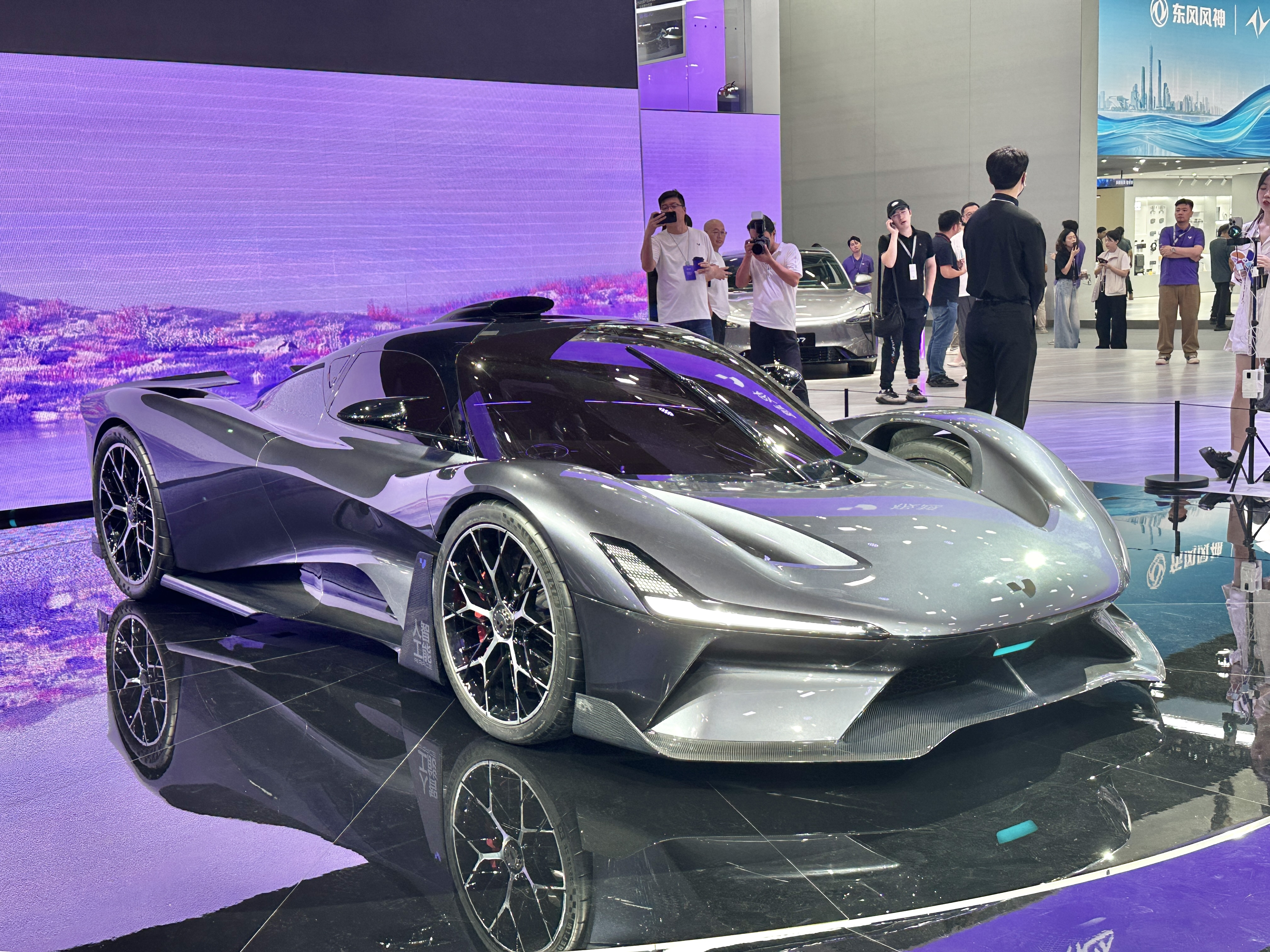
Ji Yue Robo X (concept), sport car, BEV
