= Ranz =

Automotive marque

- Product type: Automotive marque
- Current owner: Tianjin FAW Toyota Motor Co., Ltd.
- Country: China
- Introduced: February 18, 2013; 13 years ago
- Discontinued: 2017
- Markets: China

Chinese name
- Simplified Chinese: 朗世
- Literal meaning: Bright life
Transcriptions
Standard Mandarin
- Hanyu Pinyin: Lǎngshì

Ranz was an automotive marque owned by Tianjin FAW Toyota Motor Co., Ltd. which specialises in electric cars. It was launched in April 2013 Following the showing of three concept cars between 2013 and 2017 however, no production cars were sold and the marque was discontinued.

== History ==
The Ranz marque was launched with a concept car unveiled to the public at the Shanghai Auto Show in April 2013.

The Ranz EV, an electric saloon for the Chinese market based on the Toyota Corolla, was launched at the November 2014 Guangzhou Motor Show and was re-launched in 2015 as the E50 EV. As of 2016, no sales were recorded beyond a small taxi pilot. The E50 EV is powered by a 95hp electric motor and had a top speed of 120 kmh.

A second concept car was unveiled at the Beijing Auto Show in 2016. Named the RF-EA1, it was shown on the Toyota stand.

A third and final concept car was displayed at the Shanghai Auto Show in 2017 named the RF-EA2. The marque has not been used since.

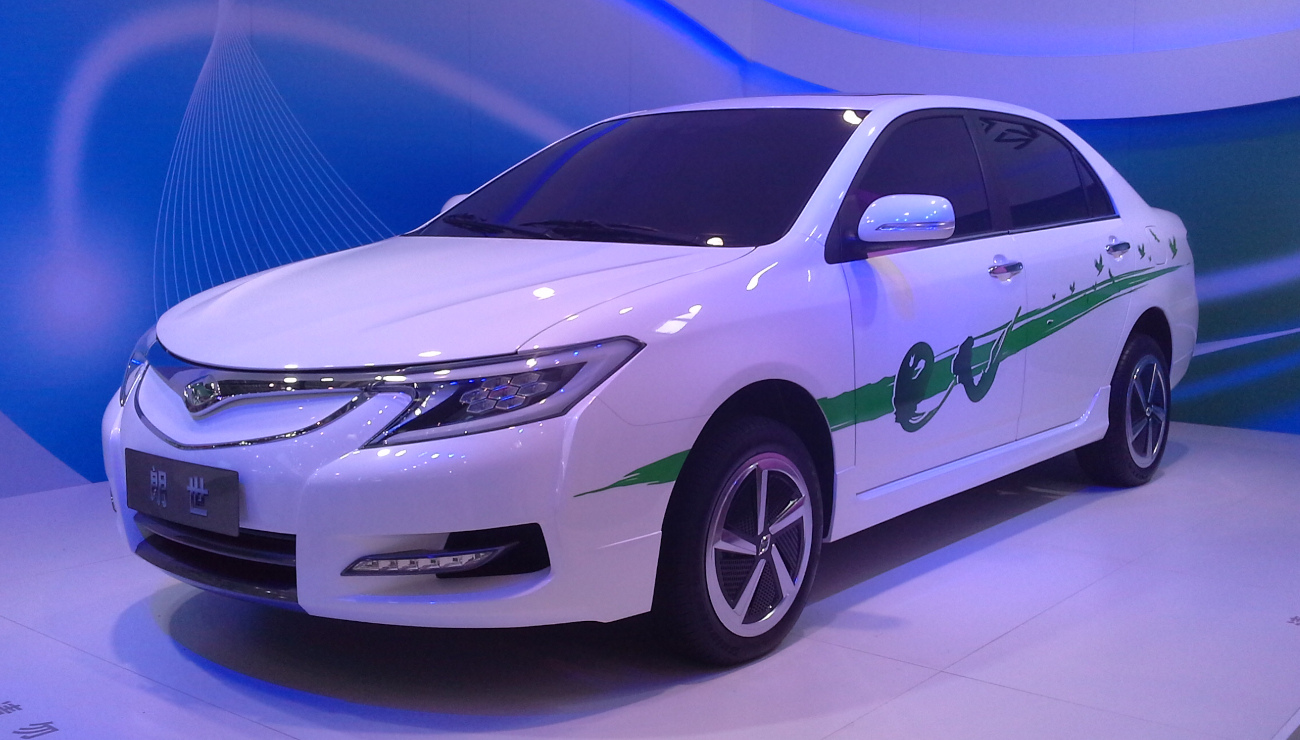
Ranz EV Concept

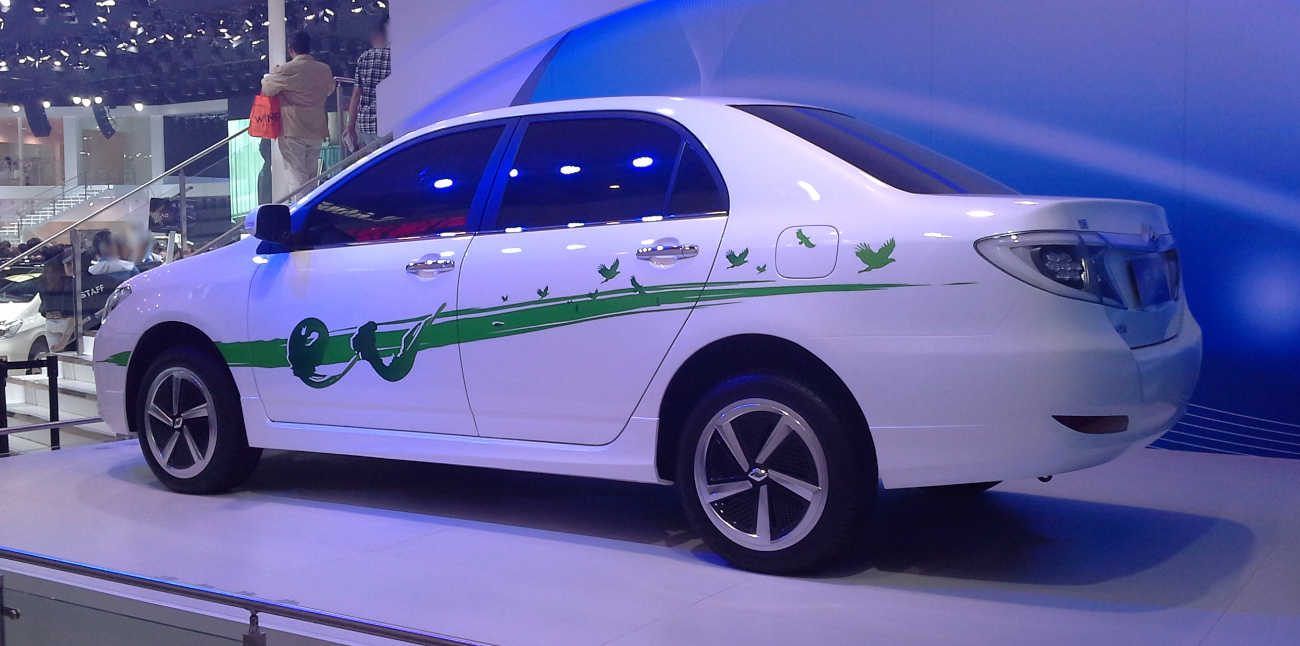
Ranz EV Concept

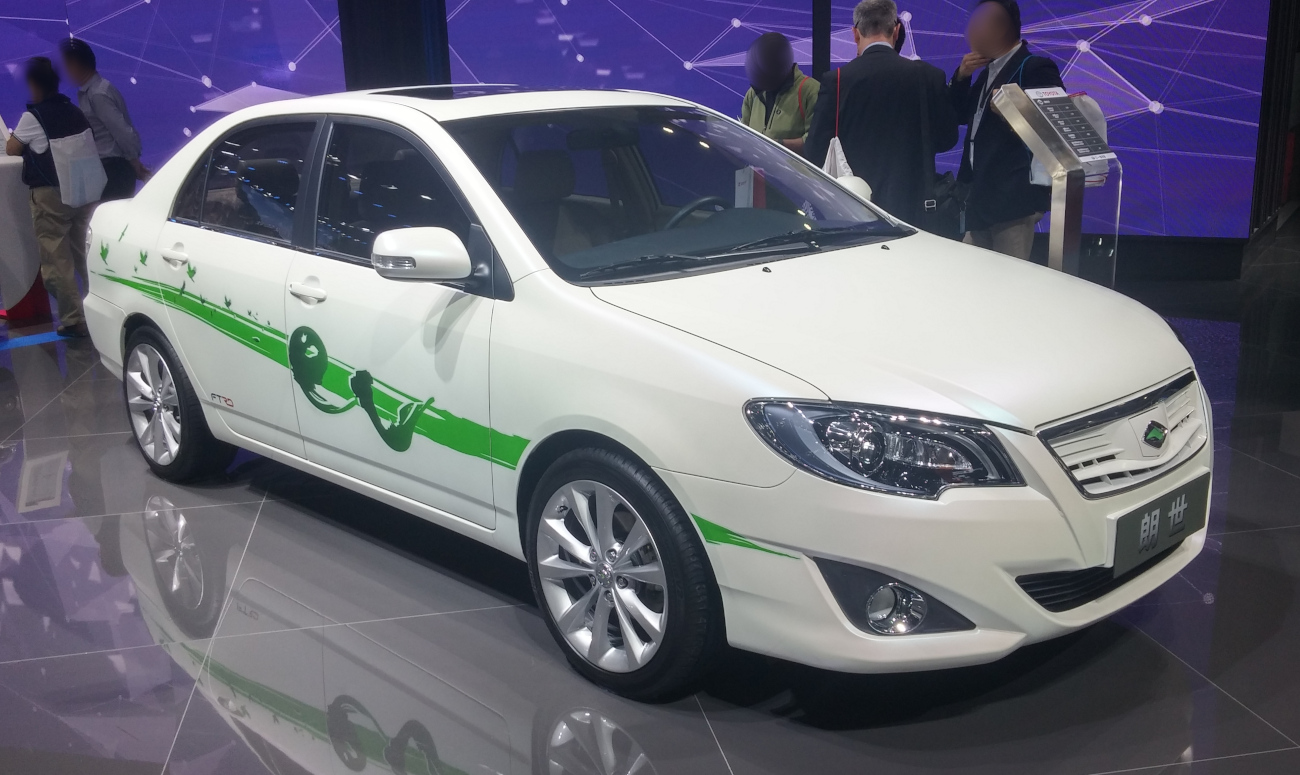
Ranz E50

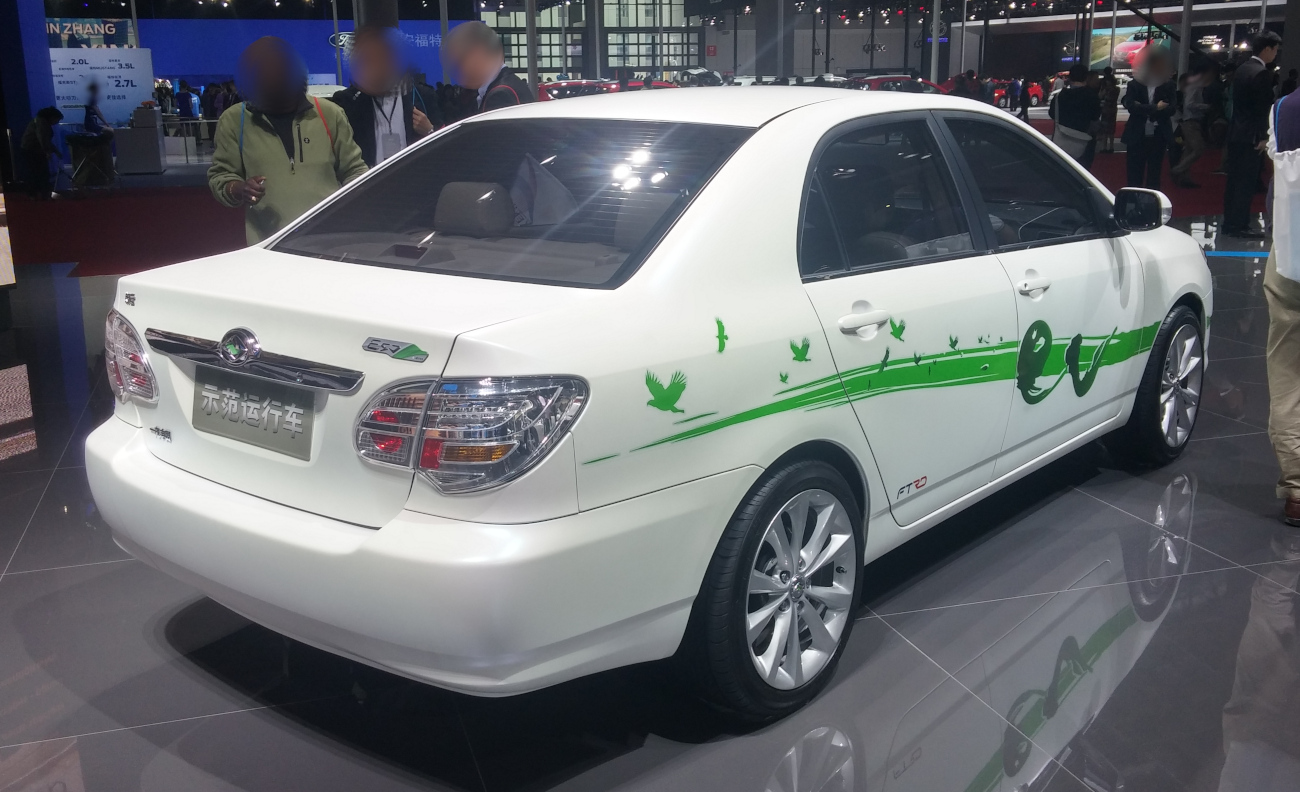
Ranz E50
