= Erkunt Group =

Turkish manufacturing company

The Erkunt Group was established in 1953 in Turkey by Abdullah Erkunt and Mümin Erkunt. The company was initially a casting and pattern shop. The tractor division of the Erkunt group is owned by the Indian giant Mahindra & Mahindra.

== History ==
The company was established in 1953 in Turkey, as a general Foundry & pattern shop. By 1955, it had become a factory for machining parts as well as casting. The factory was chiefly engaged in the production of waste water pipes to NATO standards. Following 8 years of growth, in 1961 the company became a corporation. Erkunt was then producing intermediate goods for the automotive, agricultural tractor and motor industries, utilizing the most advanced technology of the day.

Erkunt has grown to employment 174 white collar and 851 blue collar workers, totaling 1,025 in a 60,000 ton/year capacity complex that is the leader in Turkey for grey iron and nodular casting production and mechanical processing.

== Erkunt Tractor ==
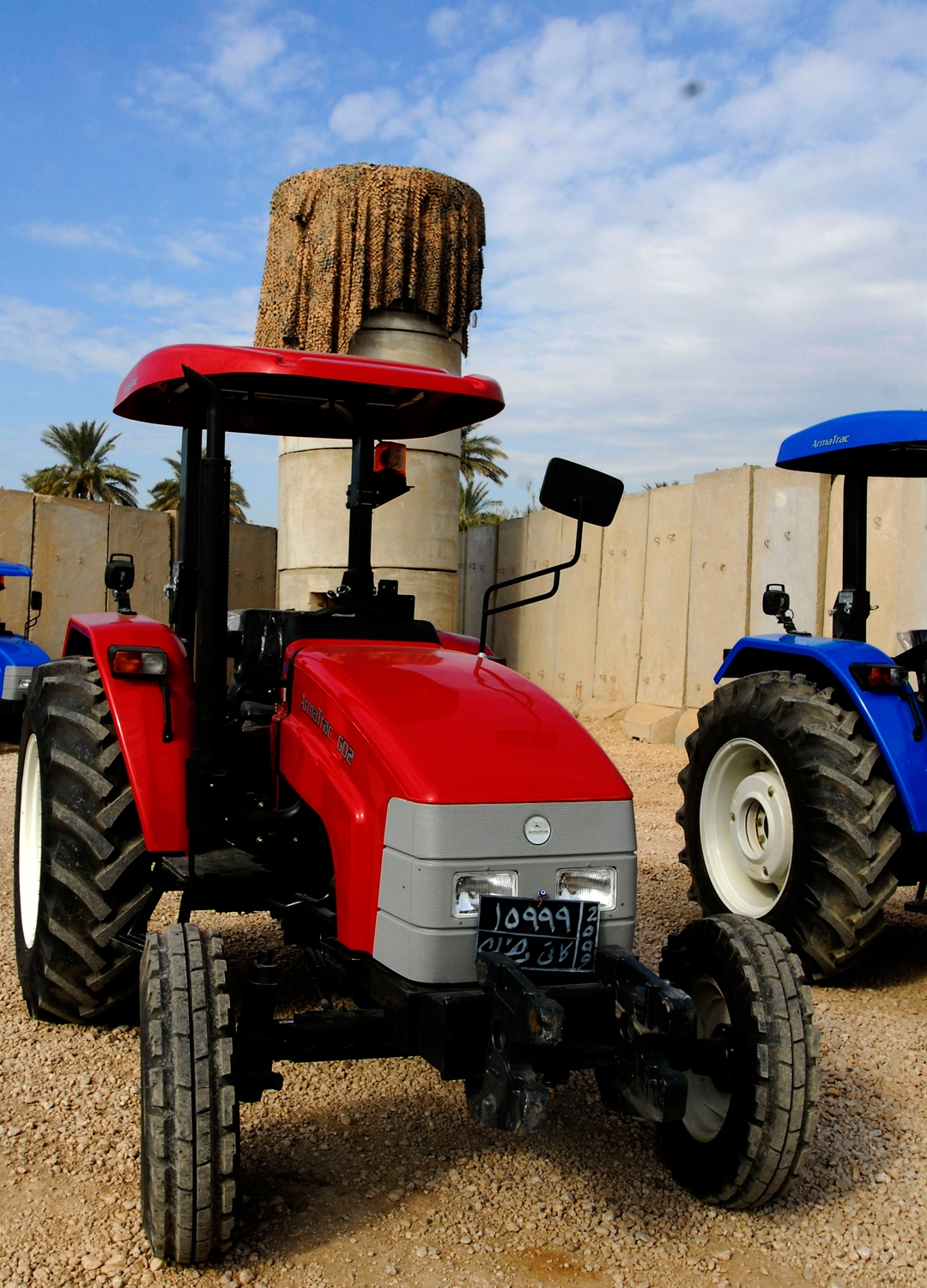
ArmaTrac 602 tractors

In 2003, the Erkunt Group started the tractor division with the establishment of Erkunt Tractor Ind. Inc. and became a member of the OEM group.

Tractor production started in September 2004. In the following 6 years, 8,268 tractors were sold in the domestic market through 73 dealers and 105 sales points. The company, which entered the market with only two models, is now able to offer potential customers in different countries almost 40 different models between 58 and 83 hp. At the end of year 2010, Erkunt's market share in Turkey is 18% and is the second-biggest tractor manufacturer in Turkey. Erkunt distributes tractors under ArmaTrac brand in international markets and works on a distributorship basis. Currently, Erkunt has distributors in Bulgaria, Hungary, Romania, Cyprus, Serbia, Greece, Austria, Finland, Portugal, Poland, Malta and Croatia in Europe as well as Morocco, Tanzania, Angola, Sudan, Yemen, Senegal and Mali in Africa; Barbuda and Antigua in America and Iraq in Asia. They have plans to grow and increase exports, including to the UK.

The tractors are designed by Turkish engineers, which is unusual in the Turkish tractor market, as most other manufacturers build them under license. The tractors are built to order. The tractors use ZF and Carraro transmissions built under license by them in Turkey.

== Diesel Engines ==
Perkins and Deutz manufacture the diesel engines.

== See also ==
- List of tractor manufacturers
