= ATC =

ATC or atc may refer to:

== Transportation and military ==
=== Aviation ===
- Air traffic control, a service provided to aircraft by ground-based controllers
  - Air traffic controller, people who expedite and maintain a safe and orderly flow of air traffic in the global air traffic control system
- Air Tanzania Corporation, the former state-owned airline of Tanzania

=== Rail ===
- Automatic train control, a safety system for railways
- Automatic and Track Control, a tokenless form of safeworking on single rail lines used in Victoria, Australia
- Atlanta Transit Company, a former rail operator in Georgia, United States

=== Other uses in civilian transportation ===
- Advanced transportation controller, a standardization effort as part of the U.S. Department of Transportation's Intelligent transportation system
- All-terrain cycle, a type of all-terrain vehicle
- Alvarado Transportation Center, an intermodal transit center in New Mexico
- American Truck Company, an American importer and/or assembler of Tatra and Kraz trucks
- Automatic traffic counter; see Traffic count
- American Tractor Corporation, a 1950 manufacturer of crawler tractors which merged into Case
- Automobile and Touring Club for United Arab Emirates, a member of the Fédération Internationale de l'Automobile

=== Military ===
- Armored Troop Carrier (LCM), used in the Vietnam War
- Air Transport Command, a United States Army Air Force command during World War II
- Air Training Command, the predecessor to Air Education and Training Command in the U.S. Air Force
- Air Training Corps, United Kingdom, for cadets
- New Zealand Air Training Corps, for cadets

== Education ==
- Academy for Technology and the Classics, a charter school in Santa Fe, New Mexico, United States
- Advanced Technology College, a community college in Daytona Beach, Florida, United States
- Aiken Technical College, a community college in Graniteville, South Carolina, United States
- Applied Technology College, one of several campuses in the Utah College of Applied Technology system
- Ambrose Treacy College, a high school in Brisbane, Australia

== Science and technology ==
- UK Astronomy Technology Centre, a part of the Science and Technology Facilities Council based at the Royal Observatory in Edinburgh, Scotland
- Automatic tool changer, a mechanism allowing CNC machines to switch cutting tools without operator intervention
- American Thermoplastic Company, an American plastics manufacturer
- American Tobacco Campus, a former property of the American Tobacco Company in Durham, North Carolina, United States
- Applied Technology Council, a nonprofit organization that studies the effects of hazards on the built environment (founded 1973)

=== Biology and medicine ===
- ATC, a codon for the amino acid isoleucine
- Acute traumatic coagulopathy, in hematology
- Anaplastic thyroid cancer, a form of thyroid cancer
- Anatomical Therapeutic Chemical Classification System, a WHO drug classification system
- Athletic Trainer Certified, a healthcare professional board-certified in athletic training
- Automatic tube compensation, a mechanical ventilation technique that compensates for the resistance of an endotracheal or tracheostomy tube

=== Telecommunications ===
- Altice (company), a Luxembourg-based multinational telecoms company by Euronext stock symbol
- Ancillary Terrestrial Component, a U.S. Federal Communications Commission-approved technique for using a network of cell-phone towers to supplement a Mobile Satellite Service
- Australian Telecommunications Corporation, formerly Australian Telecommunications Commission
- Audio Tele-Conference, a telephone call with several participants

=== Computing and linguistics ===
- ACM SIGOPS Annual Technical Conference, an annual peer-reviewed conference
- Automatic taxonomy construction, a branch of natural language processing, which applies software programs to generate taxonomical classifications from a body of texts
- Atsahuaca language (ISO 639-3 code: atc)

=== Electronics ===
- American Technology Corporation, a former name for LRAD Corporation, a sound technology company
- ATC (loudspeaker manufacturer), or Acoustic Transducer Company, a British loudspeaker and electronic equipment manufacturer

== Arts, business, and media ==
- Armacham Technology Corporation, a fictional technology developer in the video game F.E.A.R.
- Auckland Theatre Company, professional theatre company, New Zealand
- Artist trading cards, individual fine art miniatures
- All Things Comedy, a comedy company and podcast aggregate
- Against the Current (band), an American pop rock band
- A Touch of Class (band), a pop music group from Germany and the UK (1999–2003)

=== Business ===
- Agreement on Textiles and Clothing, a World Trade Organization regulation for trade in textiles and garments
- Average total cost, in economics
- Alabang Town Center, a shopping mall in Muntinlupa, Philippines
- 'Any to Come', a type of conditional bet; See Glossary of bets offered by UK bookmakers
- American-Turkish Council, a business association promoting U.S.-Turkey relations

=== Television and radio ===
- All Things Considered, a news show on National Public Radio in the United States
- Argentina Televisora Color, a former name for Televisión Pública, a television network in Argentina

== Athletics ==
- Appalachian Trail Conservancy, an American nonprofit organization
- Atlanta Track Club, a nonprofit organization based in Atlanta, Georgia
- SV Atlétiko Tera Corá, a Bonaire football club
- ATC (belay device), a type of belay device for rock climbing

== Other uses ==
- Authorization to Carry, a permit issued in Canada to carry Restricted firearms and Prohibited handguns
- Aquarian Tabernacle Church, a Wiccan church (founded 1979)

== See also ==
- Adult Third Culture Kids (ATCK), adults who as children grew up in a culture other than their parents'
