= TRC =

TRC, Trc, or TrC may refer to:

== Media and popular culture ==
- The Red Chord, an American music group
- The Rural Channel, a Canadian English language specialty channel
- TRC (band) a British hardcore punk and rap band

== Organizations ==
- The RNAi Consortium, a genetic research partnership
- Texas Railroad Commission, which regulates energy in Texas, U.S.
- Textile Research Centre, a research institute in Leiden, the Netherlands
- Truth and reconciliation commission
  - Truth and Reconciliation Commission (disambiguation), several organizations
  - Truth and Reconciliation Commission (South Africa), the most well-known one

== Science and technology ==
- Technical Requirement Checklist, a checklist mainly used to verify the technical requirement for a platform in video game testing
- Textile-reinforced concrete, a type of reinforced concrete in which the usual steel reinforcing bars are replaced by textile materials
- Tone reproduction curve in imaging, also known as tone response curve
- T_{RC} or Row Cycle Time, one of computer memory timings
- TRC, several models of boomboxes by Lasonic
- Tube resistance compensation, a mechanical ventilation technique that compensates for the resistance of an endotracheal or tracheostomy tube

== Sports ==
=== Rugby ===
- The Rugby Championship, an international rugby union competition
- Teqüe Rugby Club, a rugby union and field hockey club in Mendoza Province, Argentina
- Tigre Rugby Club, a rugby union and field hockey club in Buenos Aires Province, Argentina
- Tucumán Rugby Club, a rugby union club in Tucumán Province, Argentina

=== Other sports ===
- Thames Rowing Club, a rowing club in London, England
- Triangle Ribbon Championship, a women's professional wrestling competition

== Transportation ==
- Tanzania Railways Corporation, a state-owned enterprise that runs one of Tanzania's two main railway networks
- Toronto Railway Company, a defunct streetcar operator in Toronto, Ontario, Canada
- Transportation Research Center, an automotive proving ground in Ohio, United States
- Torreón International Airport, an airport in Coahuila, Mexico with IATA airport code TRC
- Trafnidiaeth Cymru (TrC), the Welsh name for the state transport operator Transport for Wales
  - TrC Trenau, for Trafnidiaeth Cymru Trenau, or Transport for Wales Rail
- Trona Railway, a short-line railway in the Mojave Desert with reporting mark TRC

== Other uses ==
- Tradable Renewable Certificates, non-tangible energy commodities in the United States
- Trade Reference Currency, a conceptual world currency
- TÜV Rheinland Consulting, a privately held German product certification service company
