= Automatic tube compensation =

Mechanical ventilation technique

Automatic tube compensation (ATC), also referred to as tube resistance compensation (TRC), is a technique used in mechanical ventilation to compensate for the resistance to airflow imposed by an endotracheal or tracheostomy tube. The ventilator continuously estimates the pressure drop across the tube from the measured gas flow and the tube's pressure-flow characteristics, then adds this pressure drop to the airway pressure during inspiration, or subtracts it during expiration. Hence, the ventilator does not control the airway pressure as in other pressure-controlled modes, but instead controls the tracheal pressure. Its purpose is to reduce the additional breathing load caused by the artificial airway while allowing the patient to breathe spontaneously.

ATC can be used as a stand-alone mode with the aim of establishing a constant tracheal pressure throughout the breathing cycle, or it can be used as an add-on feature and combined with additional ventilatory assistance, e.g. with Proportional assist ventilation (PAV). ATC was developed in 1993 by Ben Fabry at University Hospital Basel’s Division of Clinical Physiology, headed by Gunther Wolff. Dräger introduced ATC in their Evita 4 ventilator series in 1997. Other major manufacturers of intensive care ventilators subsequently introduced tube-compensation functions in their devices. ATC is a registered trademark of Dräger in Germany.

== Background ==
In invasively ventilated patients, an endotracheal or tracheostomy tube provides a passage for gas between the ventilator and the trachea. The tube bypasses the resistance of the patient's upper airways but introduces its own, typically substantial, resistance to airflow. The resulting pressure drop is greater in narrower tubes and increases nonlinearly with flow. For example, the pressure loss across an endotracheal tube with an inner diameter of 7 mm is around 11 cmH₂O at a flow of 1 L/s, and increases to around 44 cmH₂O at a flow of 2 L/s (Fig. 1). An intubated spontaneously breathing patient must generate additional muscular effort to overcome this pressure difference. The additional load can be particularly large in patients with high ventilatory demand.

Fig. 1. Pressure difference across uncut endotracheal tubes of different internal diameters during inspiration (positive flow) and expiration (negative flow). Curves were reconstructed from the direction-specific power-law coefficients reported by Guttmann et al.

The tube also impedes the airflow during expiration. Resistance to expiratory flow can delay lung emptying and contribute to dynamic hyperinflation. The resulting intrinsic positive end-expiratory pressure (intrinsic PEEP) can increase the effort required to initiate inspiration. Tube resistance, ventilator response delays, and the timing or cycling of pressure support contribute to a mismatch between the patient's breathing efforts and the assistance delivered by the ventilator, potentially causing marked patient-ventilator desynchronization.

== Operating principle ==
ATC uses a mathematical description to estimate the pressure drop across the tube, $\Delta p_{\mathrm{ETT}}$, and subtracts this pressure drop from the airway pressure, P_{aw}, to calculate the tracheal pressure, P_{trach}. Calculating the tracheal pressure avoids the need for continuous tracheal pressure measurement through a catheter or tracheal pressure sensor.

A frequently used model for estimating the pressure drop across the tube is the Rohrer equation: $\Delta p_{\mathrm{ETT}}=k_{1}\dot{V}+k_{2}\dot{V}|\dot{V}|$, with gas flow $\dot{V}$, coefficient $k_{1}$ describing a constant flow resistance, and coefficient $k_{2}$ describing a turbulent component that causes the pressure loss to increase quadratically with flow.

The calculated tracheal pressure is then controlled to the desired value, using the demand-flow valve of the ventilator during inspiration and the PEEP valve during expiration. In analogy to CPAP, which targets a constant airway pressure (Fig. 2C), ATC, when used as a stand-alone mode, targets a constant tracheal pressure (Fig. 2D). The ventilator therefore raises airway pressure above the PEEP level during inspiration and lowers it below the PEEP level during expiration. At low PEEP levels, this may require the application of a sub-atmospheric airway pressure (Fig. 2D,F).

Fig. 2. Airway (blue), tracheal (orange), and esophageal (green) pressure during (A, B) inspiratory pressure support (IPS) of 10 cmH₂O above PEEP of 5 cmH₂O with weak (A) and strong (B) effort; continuous positive airway pressure (CPAP) (C) and ATC (D); and ATC with weak (E) and strong (F) effort. Each pair in a row shows data from the same patient. Panels A and D are adapted from Fabry et al. (1997).

== Relationship to pressure support ==
Conventional pressure support ventilation delivers a preset increase in airway pressure during inspiration. Because the tube's pressure loss varies with flow, a fixed level of pressure support may provide more assistance than is needed to overcome tube resistance during periods of low flow and weak effort (Fig. 2A), but insufficient compensation during periods of high flow and strong effort (Fig. 2B). ATC overcomes this problem by continuously adjusting airway pressure to compensate for the estimated flow-dependent pressure drop across the tube - hence the magnitude of the pressure correction adapts to breathing effort (Fig. 2E,F). However, when ATC is used as a stand-alone mode, the patient still performs the work associated with the elastic and resistive properties of the respiratory system.

== Clinical use ==
When used as a stand-alone mode, ATC helps to assess the patient's intrinsic breathing pattern in the absence of an added load or assistance. This application has been referred to as "electronic extubation". The term describes the intended mechanical unloading of the tube, rather than a complete reproduction of breathing post-extubation, as the upper airway remains bypassed, and positive end-expiratory pressure may still be applied.

In a study of 10 postoperative patients (mean minute ventilation 7.6 L/min) and 6 patients with increased respiratory demand (mean minute ventilation 16.8 L/min), the mean added work of breathing was approximately 100 and 300 mJ/L under ATC in the two groups, respectively. By contrast, in patients with high respiratory demand, added work of breathing remained above 700 mJ/L under patient-triggered pressure support of 15 cmH₂O.

In a case study, a patient with rapid shallow breathing (respiratory rate about 50 breaths/min) was ventilated with ATC in combination with proportional assist ventilation. In this mode, all breathing efforts of the patient, as seen in the esophageal pressure trace (Fig. 3), were supported by the ventilator. When the mode was switched to patient-triggered pressure support of 15 cmH₂O above PEEP, severe patient-ventilator desynchronization became apparent, with 1:2 or 1:3 entrainment.

Fig. 3. Transition from ATC with proportional assist ventilation (PAV) to IPS of 15 cmH₂O above PEEP. PAV settings: volume-proportional pressure support (VPPS), 13 cmH₂O/L; flow-proportional pressure support (FPPS), 2 cmH₂O/(L/s). PEEP was 5 cmH₂O in both modes, and IPS cycled off at 25% of peak inspiratory flow. Volume, airway pressure, and esophageal pressure show ineffective patient efforts during IPS. Adapted from Fabry et al., Intensive Care Medicine 20 (Suppl. 2), S38 (1994).

Trials of ATC (as implemented in commercial ventilators) during weaning have produced mixed results. In a randomized trial of 99 adults, commercial ATC combined with CPAP was associated with more successful extubations than CPAP alone. Another randomized trial, involving 118 adults within a structured weaning protocol, found no difference in the duration of weaning, the rate of unsuccessful extubation, or total duration of mechanical ventilation between ATC and CPAP during spontaneous breathing trials.

A 2022 systematic review and network meta-analysis of seven randomized studies found that commercial ATC set to 100% compensation, combined with PEEP below 7.5 cmH₂O, was associated with greater extubation success than a T-piece trial or CPAP below 7.5 cmH₂O. ATC had the highest ranking for extubation success, but not for successful completion of the breathing trial itself.

== Limitations and ventilator performance ==
=== Accuracy of compensation ===
ATC depends on both an accurate estimate of tube pressure loss and a sufficiently rapid ventilator response. Secretions can narrow the effective lumen and increase resistance beyond that of an unused tube with the same nominal diameter. A model based on the nominal tube size can therefore underestimate the pressure correction required. Measurements of tubes removed from patients have shown substantial and variable increases in resistance, while bench tests have demonstrated reduced compensation when the tube and the ventilator's tube-size setting do not match.

Commercial ventilators currently on the market cannot generate sub-atmospheric airway pressure, which limits their expiratory compensation at low PEEP or high expiratory flow. Pressure limits, valve behavior, and delays in delivering gas also affect the compensation actually achieved.

=== Bench studies ===
A 2003 bench comparison found that, relative to CPAP, the original 1994 ATC prototype reduced additional inspiratory work of breathing by 97%, compared with 58% in the Dräger Evita 4 and 50% in the Puritan-Bennett 840. The authors concluded that the commercial ATC systems tested might offer negligible advantages over conventional pressure support for tube compensation.

A 2026 bench study published as a medRxiv preprint found similar limitations when comparing five commercial ICU ventilators with a newer ATC prototype. Averaged across the tested conditions, the best-performing commercial ventilator reduced effective resistance over the whole breathing cycle by 25% relative to unsupported breathing through the tube, compared with 79% for the prototype. In some test conditions, the residual load with commercial ATC exceeded that of unsupported breathing through the tube, which served as a bench reference for a zero-PEEP T-piece trial.
