= Ingersoll Power Equipment =

Manufacturing companies based in Maine

Ingersoll Power Equipment is a garden and compact tractor manufacturer located in West Olive, Michigan. As of November 15, 2024, it is under the ownership of Case Ingersoll Parts LLC.

== History ==
Ingersoll Equipment Company, Inc.(no connection to Ingersoll Rand) was formed when Jack Ingersoll purchased the garden tractor division from Case Corporation in late 1983.

Case garden tractors came into existence in 1965, after the purchase of Colt Garden Tractors/Colt Equipment in late 1964. The motive behind the acquisition was a revolutionary patented hydraulic drive system. This heavy duty drive system could easily power a wide range of accessories uncommon to tractor owners at that time. Production began with the 1965 Case 130 and 180. Both were powered with the reliable Kohler K-Series engine with 10 and 12 HP respectively. The 130 Lo Profile model came with 12" rear rims and the High Wheel 180 model came with 16" rear rims. The Colt tractors remained in production through 1965 and 1966 but the decision to stop producing Colts came in the summer of 1966. There were no 1967 Colt tractors made. Other Case models sold between 1965 and 1969 were the 120, 150, 155, 190, and 195. All of these tractors sported the chrome Old Abe badge on the grille and Desert Sunset and Flambeau Red paint used by the Agricultural Division of J.I. Case.

1968 was the last year for the 100 series and 1969 brought on the all new 200 and 400 series. The tractors were completely restyled to emulate the newly introduced 70 Series Ag tractors and had rectangular headlamps and a squared hood. The older 180, 190, and 195's were prone to rear axle shaft breakage as well as front axle breakage under certain circumstances that were on the edge of abuse. The new 200 and 400 Series tractors used a much stronger trans-axle and cast steel front axle as well as a much stronger main frame. The patented hydraulic drive remained but it was improved upon by upping the maximum operating pressure from 1600 PSI to 2150 PSI at the travel valve and 2250 at the rear PTO valve, used to power attachments.

The early 1970s saw the end of the older "elephant ear" style of rear fenders on the Big Wheel tractors in favor of a flat top fender. 1971 saw the debut of the 'Snap-Fast' attachment system that consisted of spring-loaded pins on the front of the tractor. This made it very easy for owners to change front mounted attachments and mower decks without the need of tools or having to lay on the ground. This was done in answer to the frequent complaints regarding the time and work required to remove the mower deck, utility blade or snowcaster. Snap-Fast has been such a successful system that it remains unchanged to this day. 1973 brought the introduction of the 210 Model which was Kohler K powered 10 HP garden tractor with a Peerless 4 speed gear trans-axle instead of the hydraulic drive system used by all the other Case garden tractors. This was priced considerably lower than the hydraulic drive models and was more or less an entry level GT for those wishing to own a Case. A mechanical drive rotary tiller was engineered to work with this one model and an optional sleeve hitch was also available for the mounting of ground engaging attachments. The use of rubber isolator engine mounts was introduced in 1973 to help reduce vibration from the one lung Kohler K engines. For the 1976 production year, the exhaust system was moved under the hood.

1977 signaled the end of Desert Sunset paint and it was the first year Case garden tractors came with Power Red everywhere except for the Power White wheel rims. The use of the Delco-Remy Starter/Generator ended in 1977 on the Kohler powered tractors. From 1978 on, alternators and starter motors were standard issue. Case engineered a 60-inch cutting width mower deck to be introduced for the 1980 model year at the same time the more powerful 448 became available. In order to fit that larger mower deck under the tractor, two inches were added to the frame between the seat base and the dash tower. The 444, 446 and 448 models all sported the longer 48 inch wheelbase while the 200 Lo Pro tractors remained with a 46-inch wheelbase. The new 60-inch deck was not available for the Lo Pro models.

In late 1983, Case sold their garden tractor division to Jack Ingersoll, and the former Outdoor Power Equipment Division of Case in Winneconne, Wisconsin became Ingersoll Tractor Company. Initially, the badging on the tractors remained predominantly CASE during the transition period, but the Ingersoll brand became more and more prevalent during 1985 and 1986. By 1987, the Case name was permanently gone. For the 1984 year only, all of the tractors came with black frames and undercarriages. The hood, fenders and seat pedestal were Power Red. The wheel rims were Power White as were all of the attachments. A white Naugahyde seat was used. The most obvious change Ingersoll made immediately following their purchase was hood "flaring" or "bulging" to the sides.

1988 marked the end of the 200 and 400 Series and 1989 was the debut of the 3000 and 4000 Series that replaced the former 200 and 400 Series respectively. While these look nearly identical to 200 and 400 models, the engines were turned the opposite direction in the frame. Gone was the former hand-engaged front PTO in favor of an electric clutch. Doing this required the use of right-hand discharge mowing decks (earlier models were left-hand), opposite spinning snowcasters, and a relocation of the hydraulic oil cooler. Through the late 1980s and 1990s, Ingersoll continued tweaking and refining their tractors. In the early 1990s, Ingersoll produced several All Hydraulic tractors known as the 3100 and 4100 Series that did away with the V-belt that formerly drove the mower decks and snow casters on other models. They even offered a Perkins diesel engine on two of the models. Power steering was standard on all of the AH Series tractors. The AH Series tractors had implements designed specifically for them, due to the higher GPM of the hydraulic system. The writing was on the wall for the tried and true Onan twin cylinder engine because it could no longer meet the new emissions standards imposed by the EPA. Ingersoll then switched to the Vanguard OHV twin from Briggs & Stratton. The Kohler K engine had been replaced by the Kohler M (Magnum) engine several years back but it too was unable to conform to the stringent emissions rules.

At some point during the mid-1990s, Jack Ingersoll sold his company to the German consortium Rothenberger Group. Rothenberger's did little to promote the Ingersoll brand during their ownership, and the company began to slide slowly into oblivion. By the end of 2004, it was all over and Ingersoll filed for Chapter 128 of the Wisconsin Statutes that govern bankruptcy. On April 15, 2005, Eastman Industries purchased only the assets and name of Ingersoll Tractor and began their plan to move the company to a new facility in Portland, Maine. Production of just the 4000 Series was resumed. The 7000, 6000, 5000 and 3000 Series were initially shelved. Gone too were all of the lawn tractors Ingersoll once produced. The owner of Eastman suffered a skiing accident that left him a quadriplegic. In addition to that, the US economy was reeling over the cost of multiple wars, the collapse of Freddie Mac and Fannie Mae, the imminent bankruptcy of General Motors and Chrysler and major problems in the banking sector. Unemployment soared and many citizens lost everything they owned. Add to this the large number of Zero-Turn Radius mowers that began to flood the commercial market initially and then filtered down to the residential market.

On November 14th of 2024, the Ingersoll Tractor Company was purchased by Case Ingersoll Parts, located in West Olive, Michigan. Currently the company is providing new and used parts to customers and authorized dealers. Production is assumed to restart at some point in late 2026-2027 with the primary focus starting on attachments and then 4000 series. There is hopes to start producing 6000 and 7000 series loaders eventually and even start producing zero turns.
