= Case Corporation =

American agricultural and construction equipment manufacturer

- Industry: Agricultural machinery; Heavy equipment
- Founded: 1842; 184 years ago (as J. I. Case Threshing Machine Company); Racine, Wisconsin, U.S.
- Defunct: November 1999
- Successor: CNH Global
- Products: Tractors, threshers, combines, backhoes, diesel engines

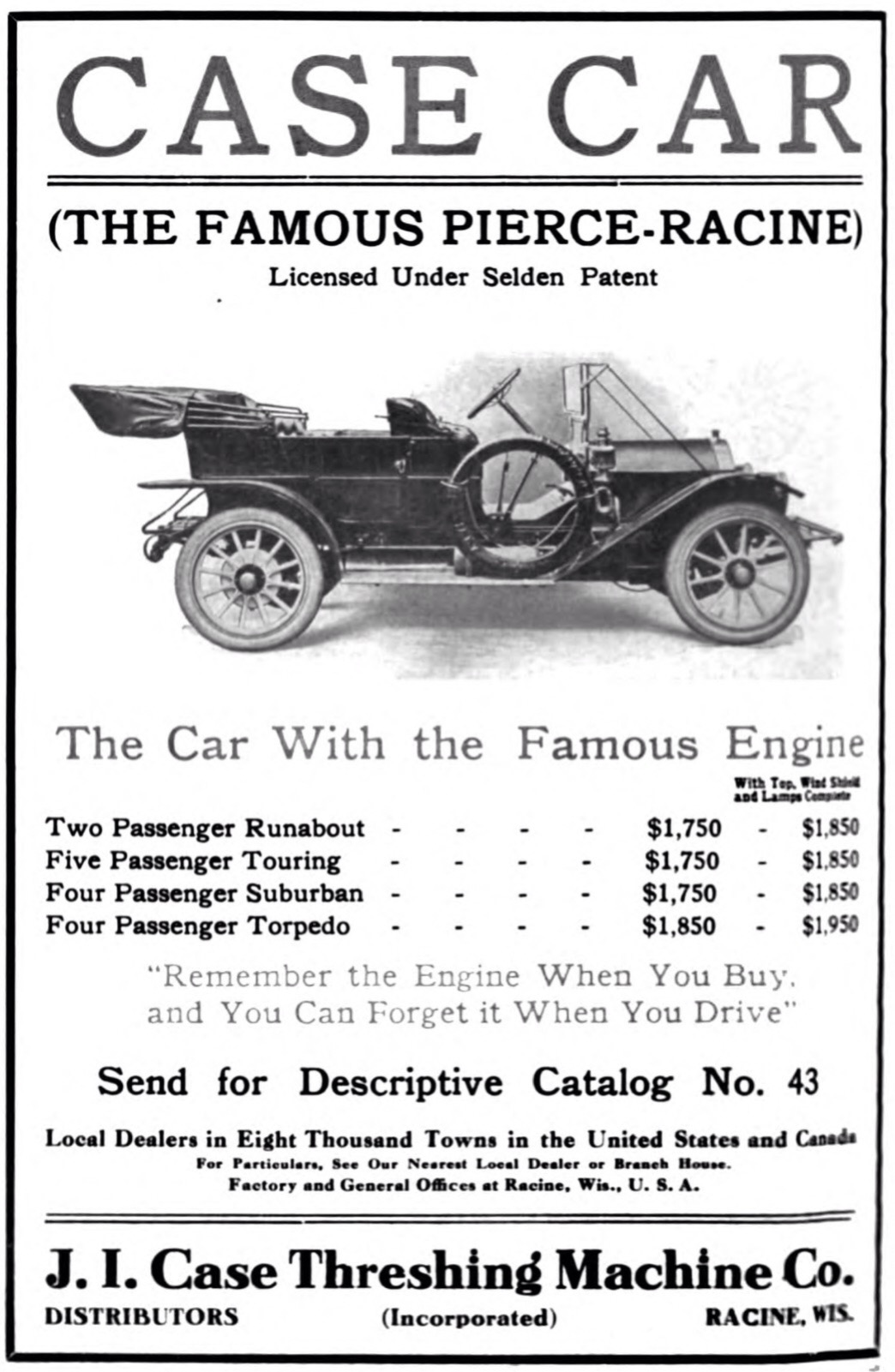
Case Car

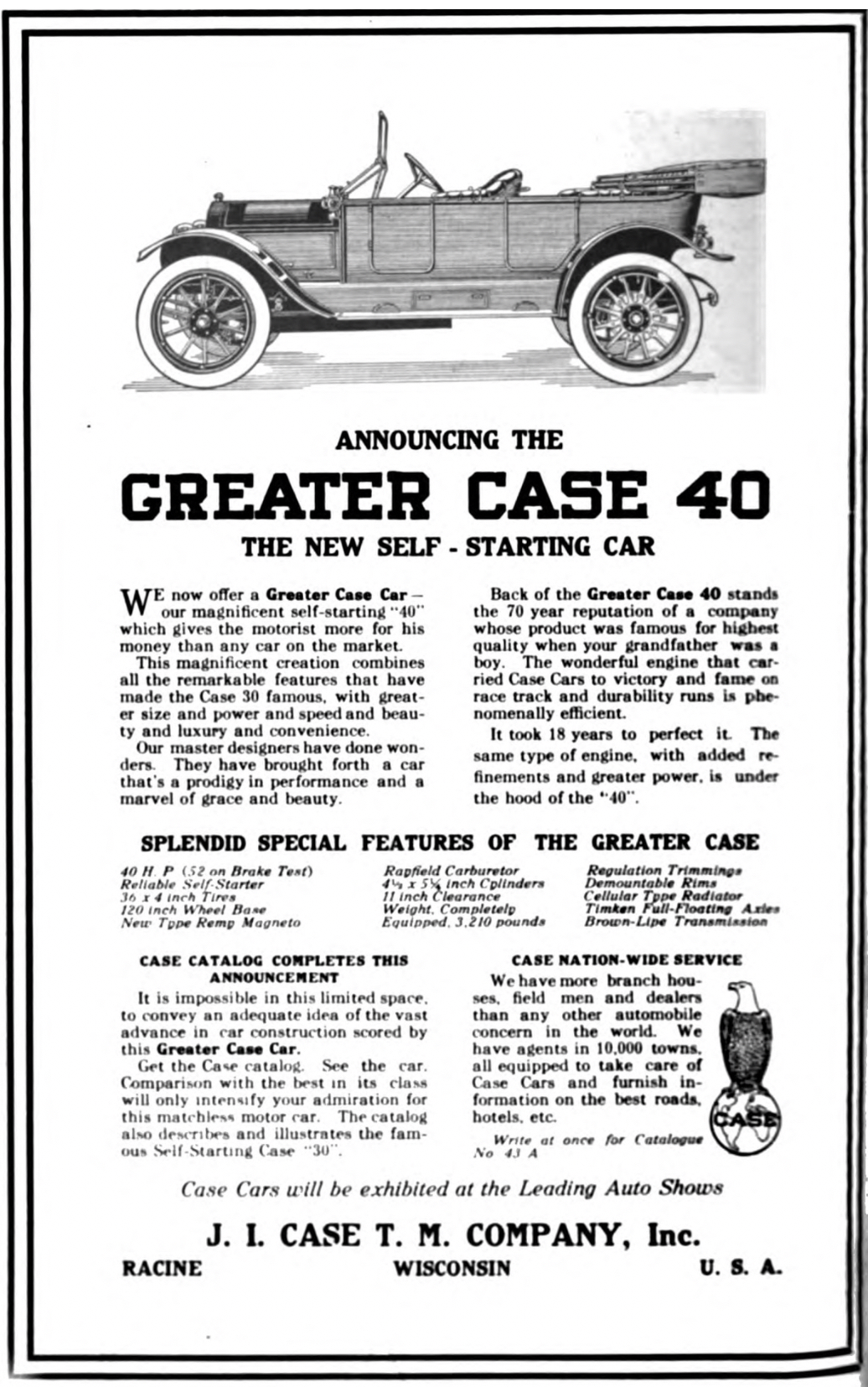
Case 40 (1912-1915)

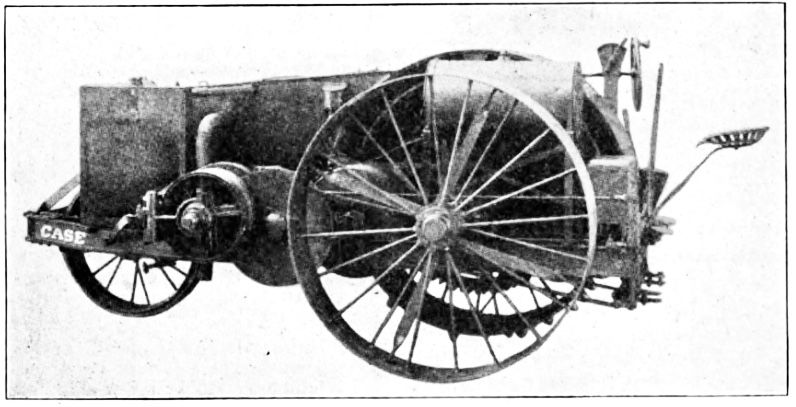
Case 10-20 (1915-1918)

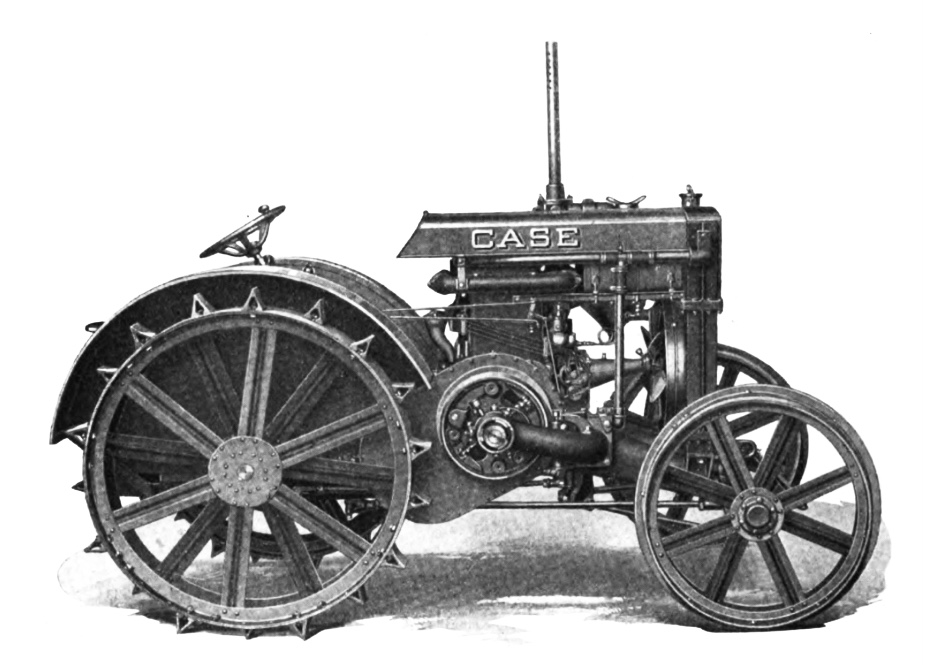
Case 9-18 (1916-1918)

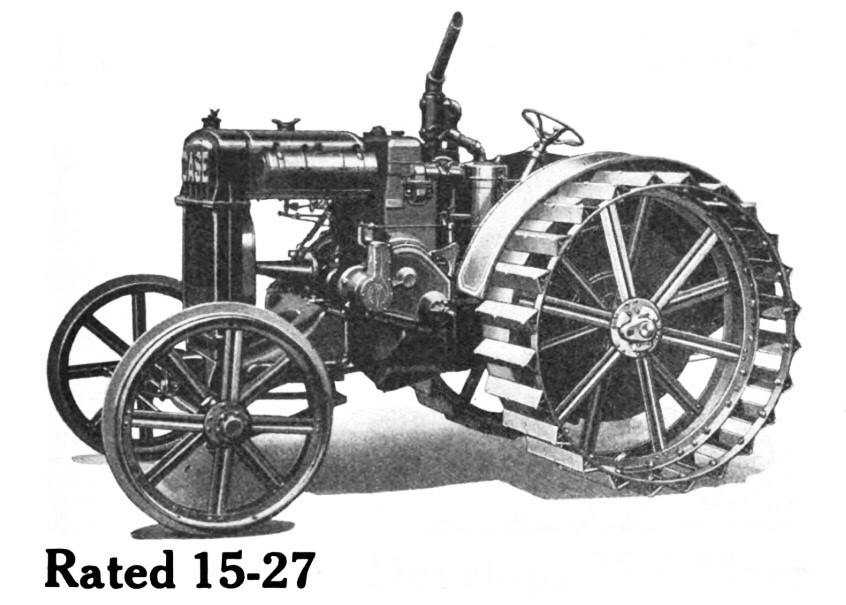
Case 15-27 (1919-1924)

Case advertisement (1919)

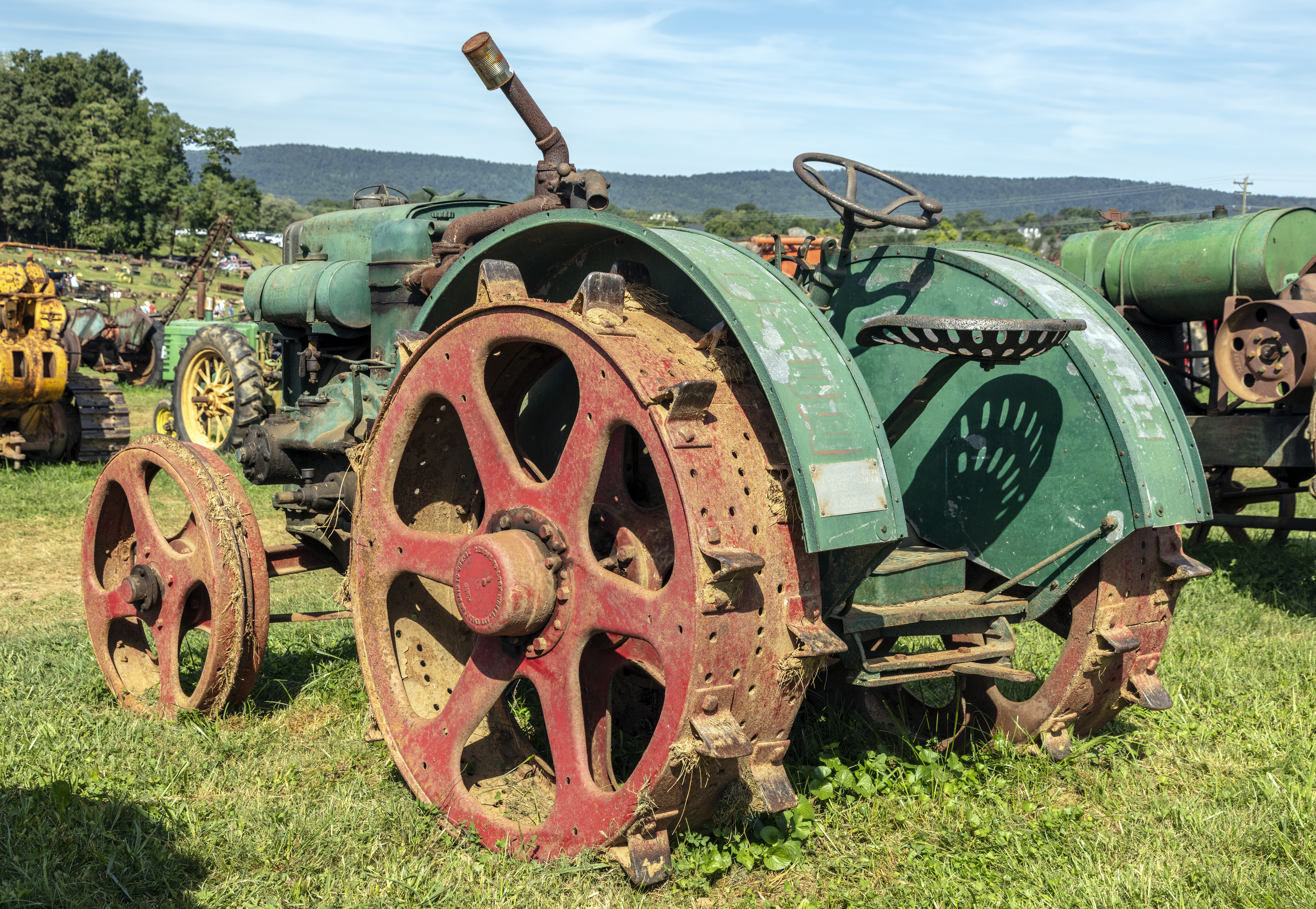
Case 12-20 tractor (1921-1927)

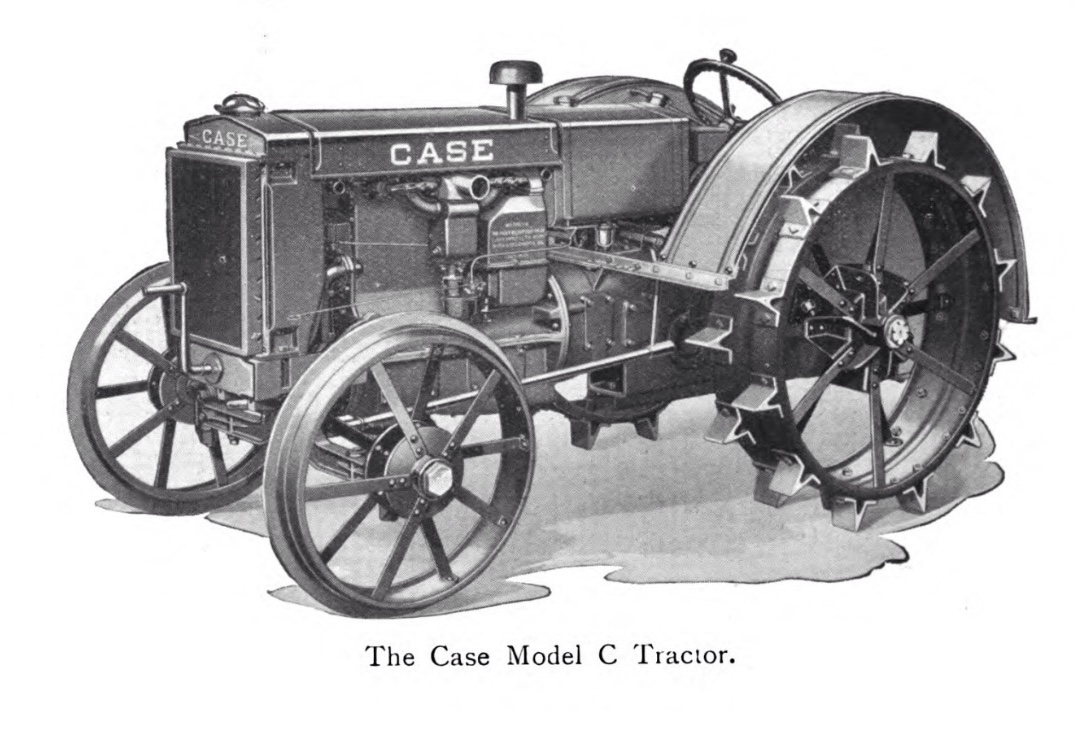
Case Model C (1929-1940)

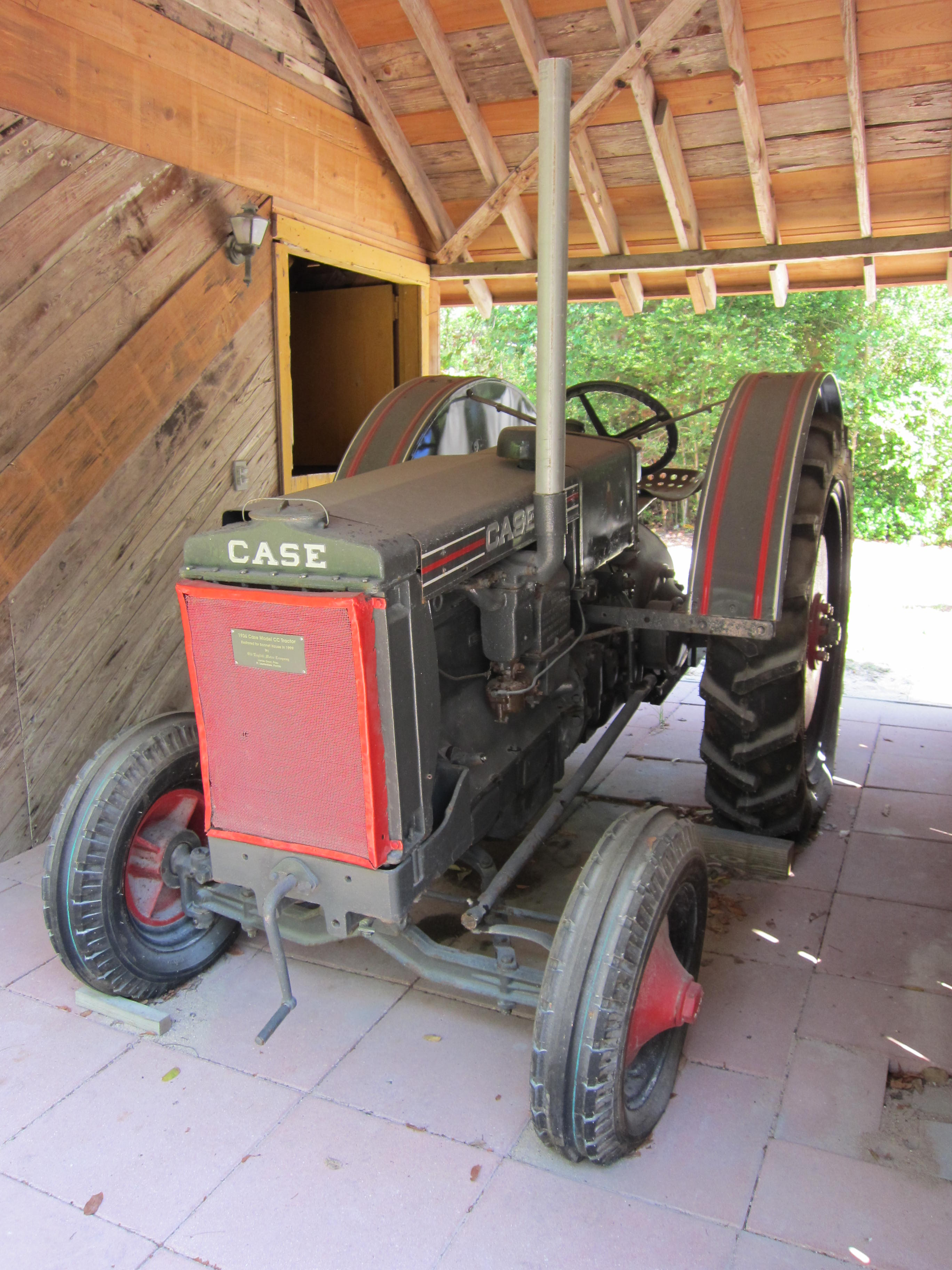
1936 Case Model CC (1929-1939)

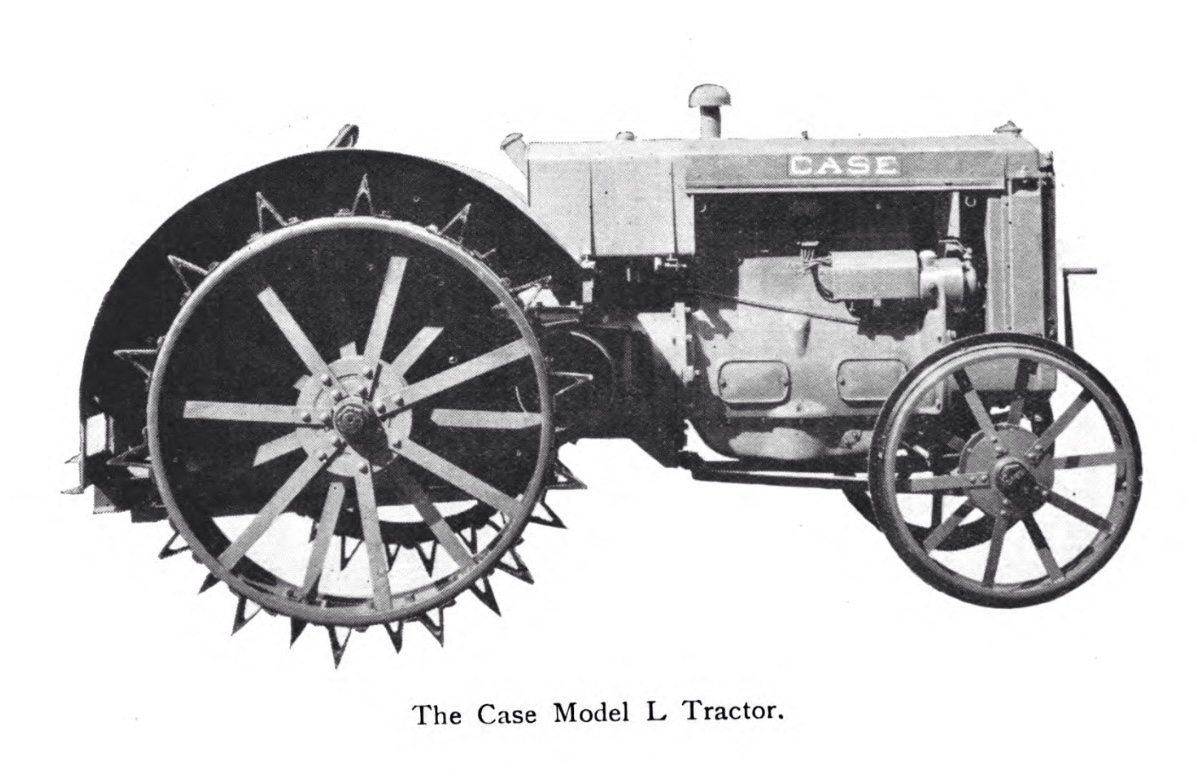
Case Model L (1929-1940)

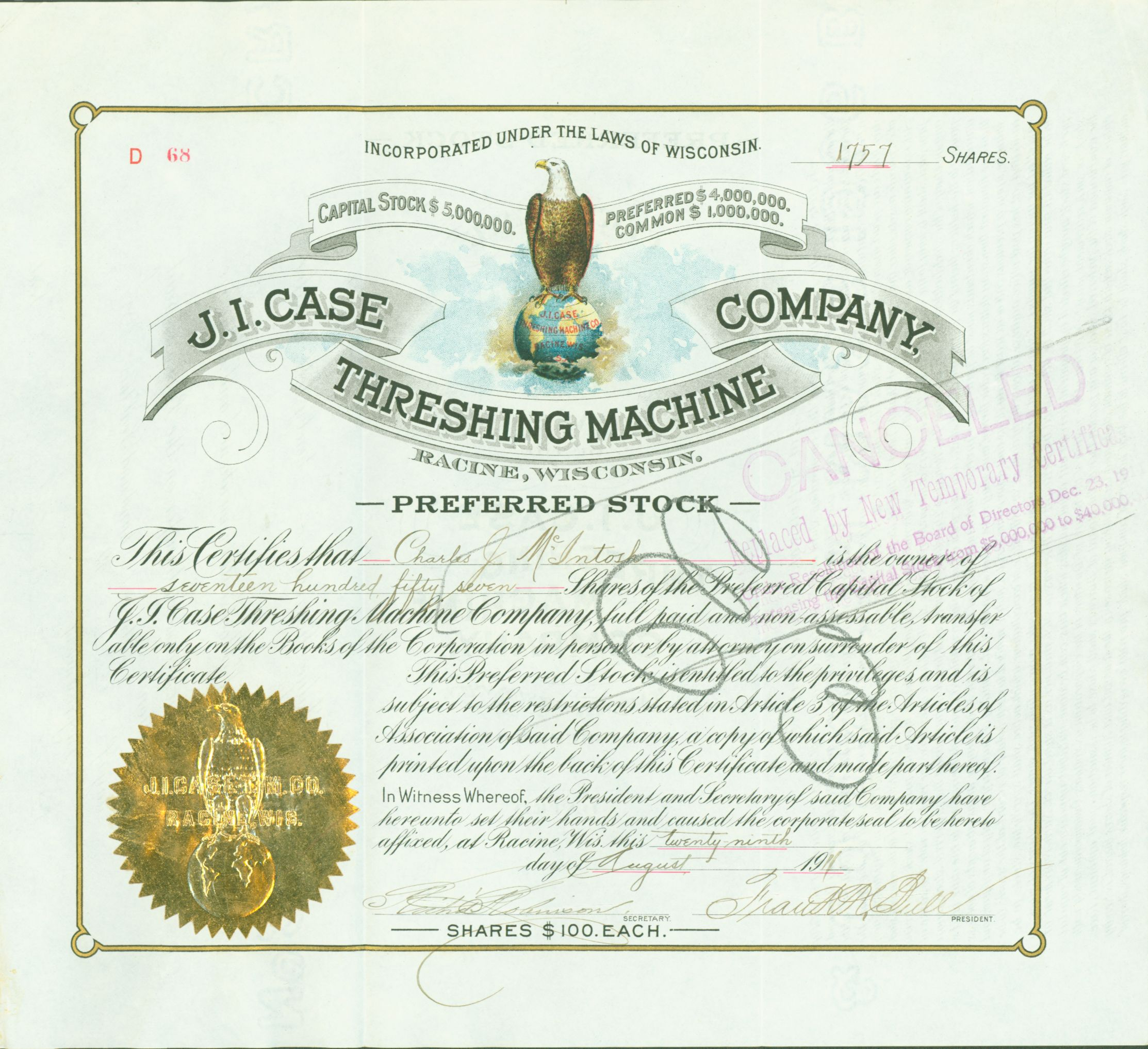
Preferred share of the J. I. Case Threshing Machine Company, issued 29. August 1911

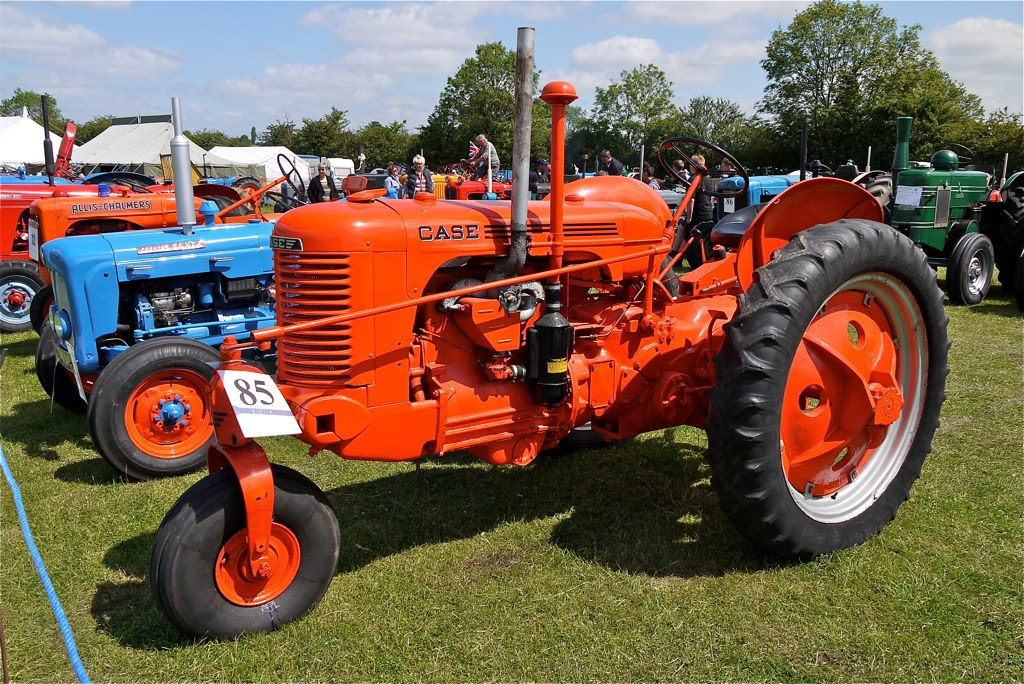
A Case row-crop model, circa 1940s

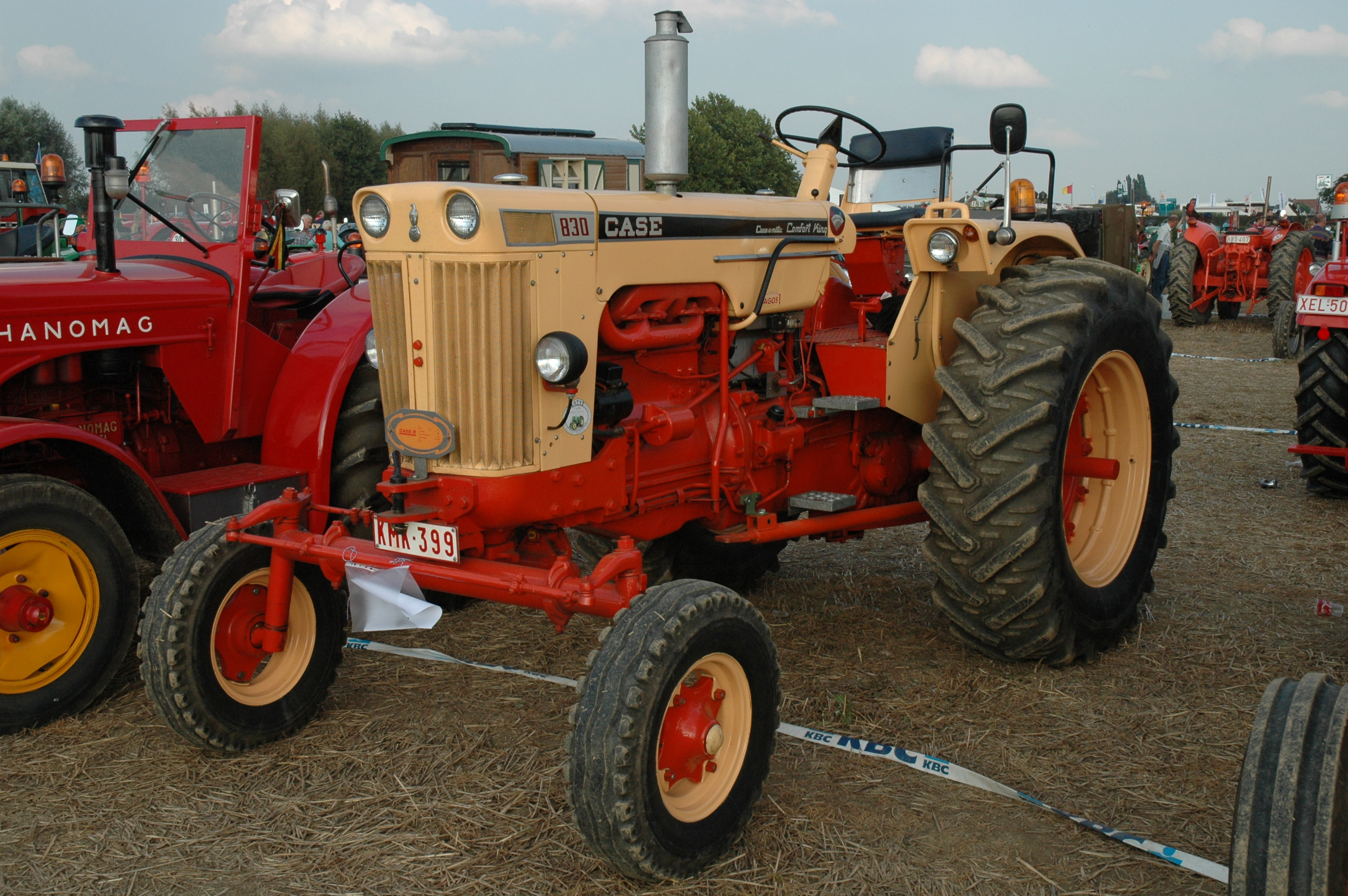
Case Model 830

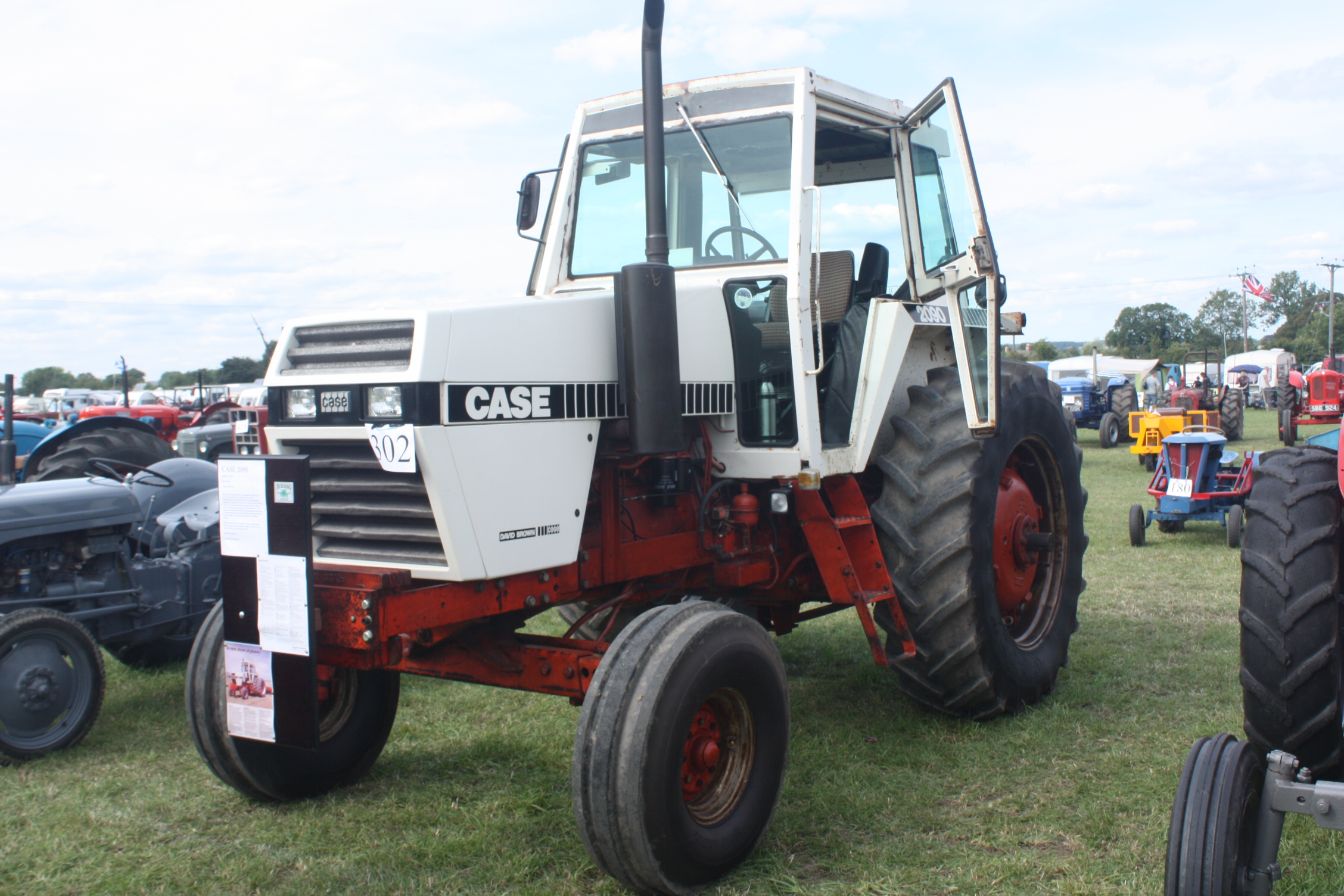
Case Model 2090

Case Corporation was a manufacturer of agricultural machinery and construction equipment. Founded in 1842 by Jerome Increase Case as the J. I. Case Threshing Machine Company, it operated under that name until 1928. For 66 years after that it was the J. I. Case Company, and was often called simply Case. In the late 19th century, Case was one of America's largest builders of steam engines, producing self-propelled portable engines, traction engines and steam tractors. It was a major producer of threshing machines and other harvesting equipment. The company also produced various machinery for the U.S. military (combat engineer equipment for the USMC, full-tracked tractors and scoop loaders for the U.S. Army, etc.). In the 20th century, Case was among the ten largest builders of farm tractors for many years. In the 1950s its construction equipment line became its primary focus, with agricultural business second.

Case's corporate entities and brands changed several times in the 1980s and 1990s. When its corporate parent, Tenneco, bought International Harvester's agricultural equipment division and merged it into Case, the J. I. Case Company continued, but it began using the Case IH brand. In the 1990s it changed names several more times (each name including "Case") before its merger into CNH Global ended its history as a distinct entity. Various CNH brands continue to make use of the Case name, such as Case CE and Case IH.

== Name details ==
Founded by Jerome I. Case in 1842 as the J. I. Case Threshing Machine Company, the company operated under that name until 1928. In some of its advertisements the name was styled J. I. Case T. M. Co. for short. Another business founded by Jerome I. Case, the J. I. Case Plow Works, was an independent business. When Massey-Harris bought the J. I. Case Plow Works in 1928, they sold its name rights to the J. I. Case Threshing Machine Company, which reincorporated as the J. I. Case Company. That company, which became majority-owned by Tenneco in 1967 and a wholly owned subsidiary in 1970, was often called by the simple brand name Case.

In 1984, Tenneco bought International Harvester's agricultural equipment division and merged it into Case, and the farm equipment brands were combined as Case IH, although the corporation legally remained the J. I. Case Company. It continued as such until 1994, when Tenneco divested it as the Case Equipment Corporation. Case Equipment became Case Corporation and later Case LLC.

In 1999, Case LLC merged with New Holland Agriculture to form CNH Global, a Fiat Group division, which has since been demerged into a corporation that is majority-owned by Fiat Industrial. The name Case lives on in two CNH brands: Case CE (from "Construction Equipment"), which is the world's third largest brand of construction equipment, and Case IH, which is the world's second largest brand of agricultural equipment.

== History ==
=== Founder ===
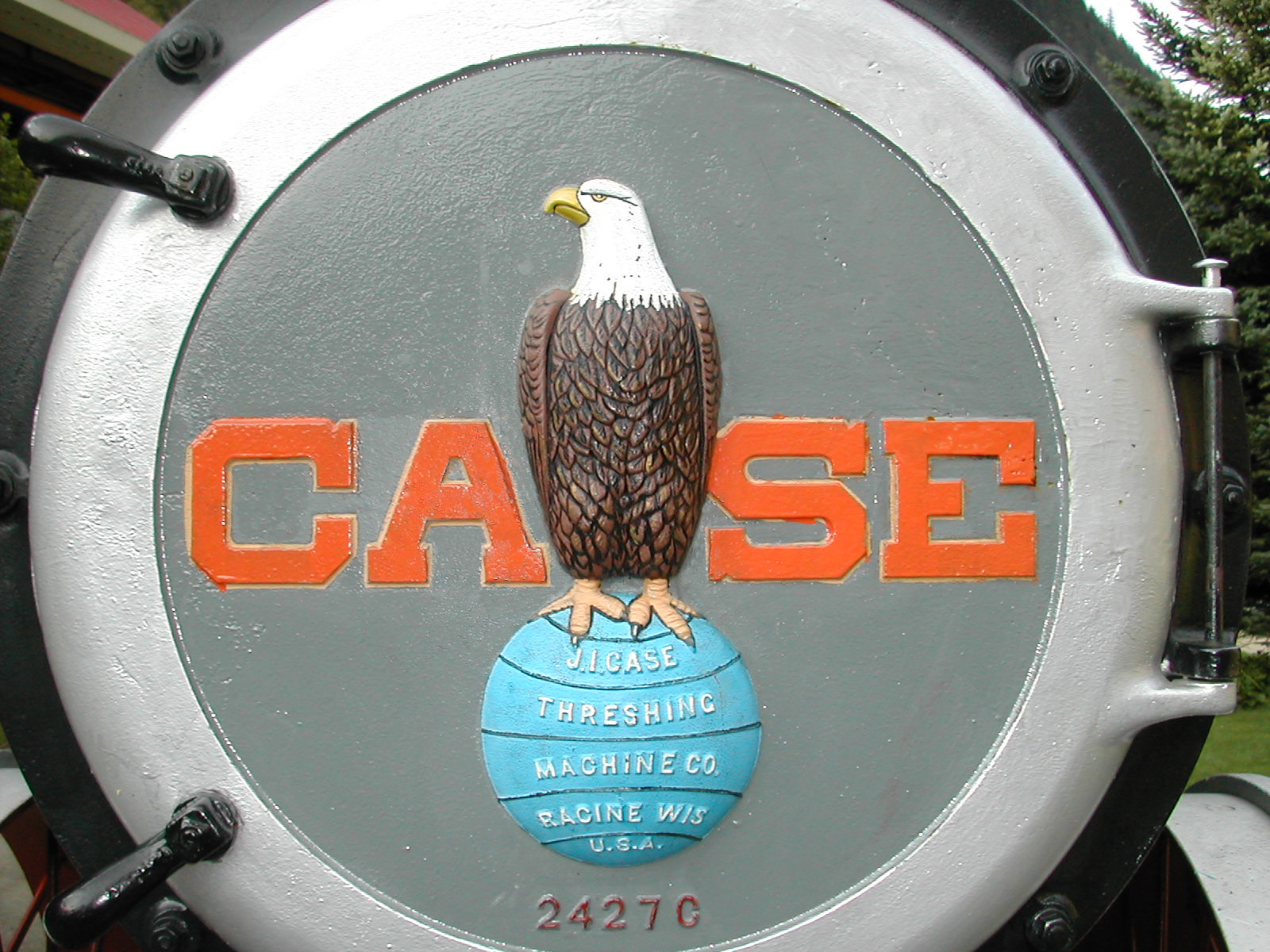
"Old Abe", the famous eagle of the Wisconsin 8th Infantry, was the J. I. Case mascot.

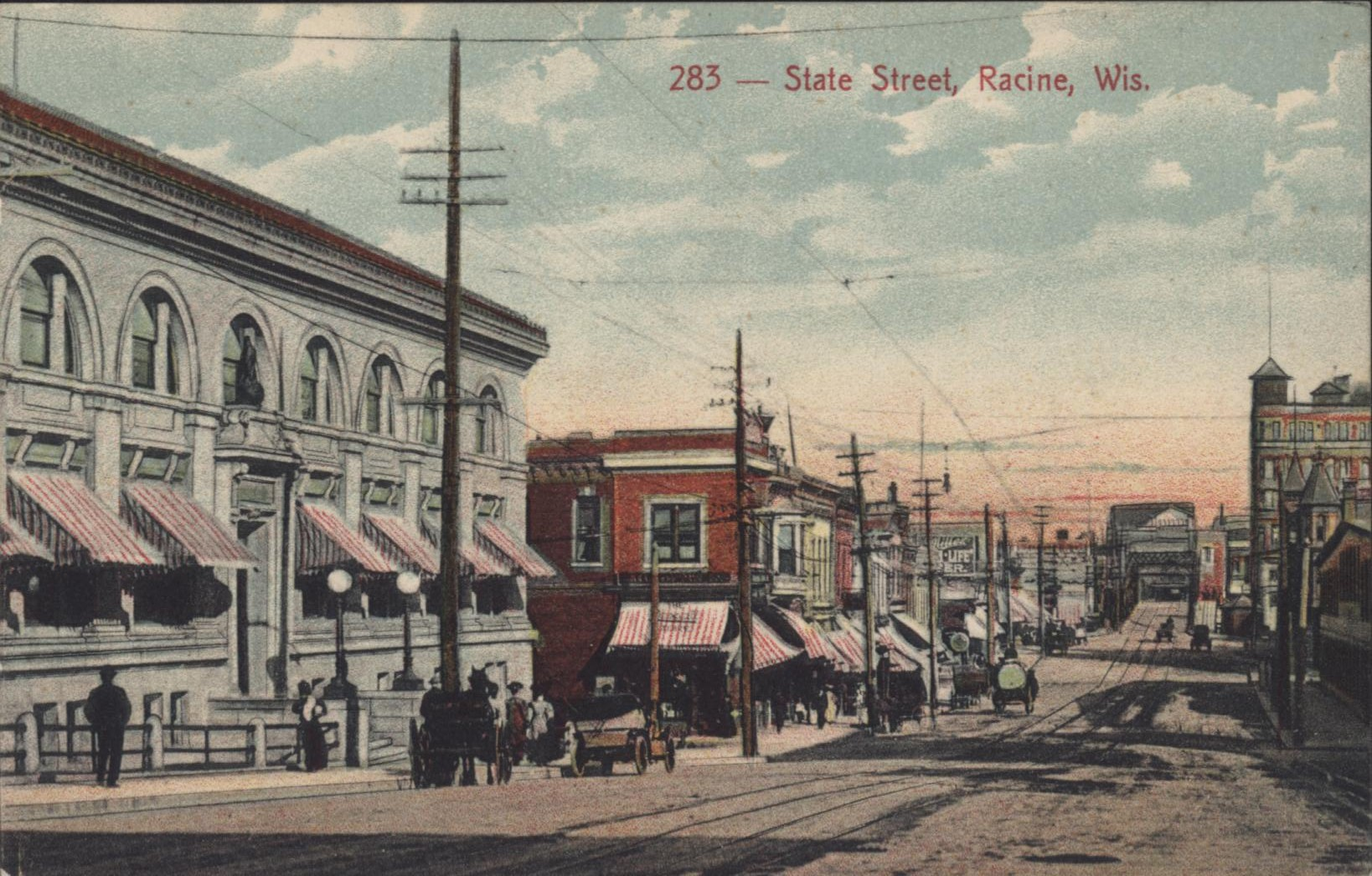
State Street, Racine, Wisconsin, looking east toward Lake Michigan. The Case building is on the left with the statue of Old Abe on the front.

Jerome Increase Case (1819–1891) was born to a farming family in Williamstown, New York. As a young child, Case read about a machine that could cut wheat without people needing to use their hands. He developed an interest in agriculture at that point.

Case took small, hand-powered threshing machines to Wisconsin in 1842, where he improved the design and established a company to manufacture them. In 1843, Case moved the business to Racine, Wisconsin, in order to have better access to water power, and opened the Racine Threshing Machine Works. In 1863, Case partnered with three of his top employees, Massena Erskine, Robert Baker and Stephen Bull. Case was also involved in politics and horseracing. Over time, the company grew.

=== Competition in the farm business ===
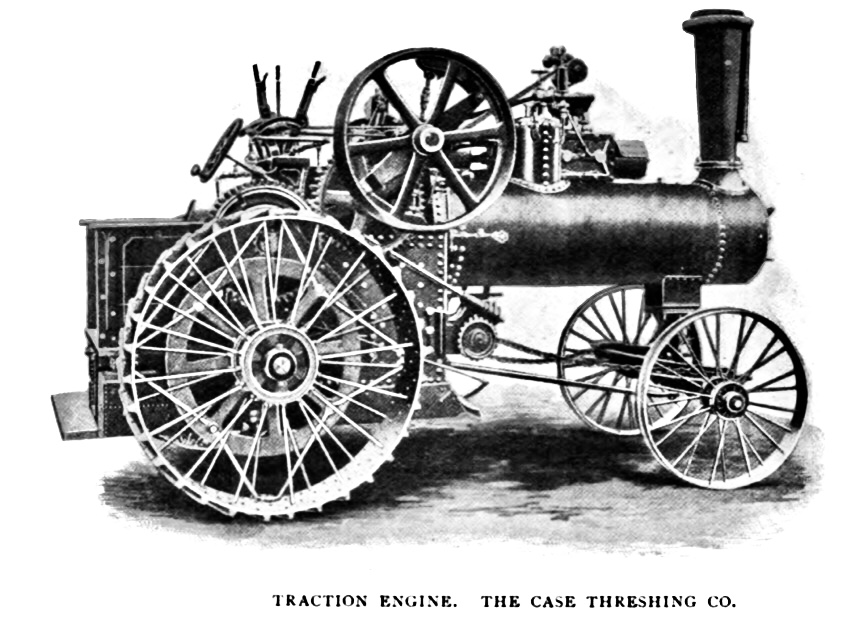
Case Steam Tractor (1904)

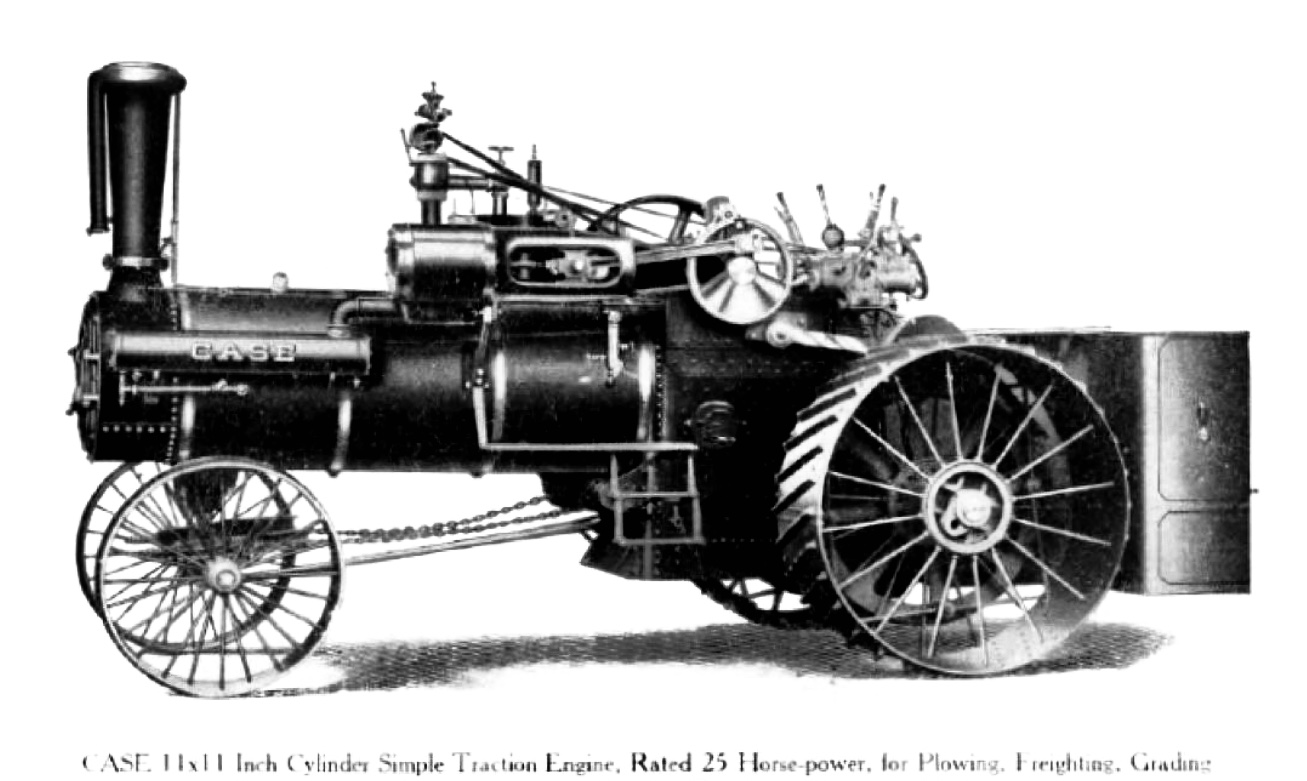
Case Simple 25 hp (1909)

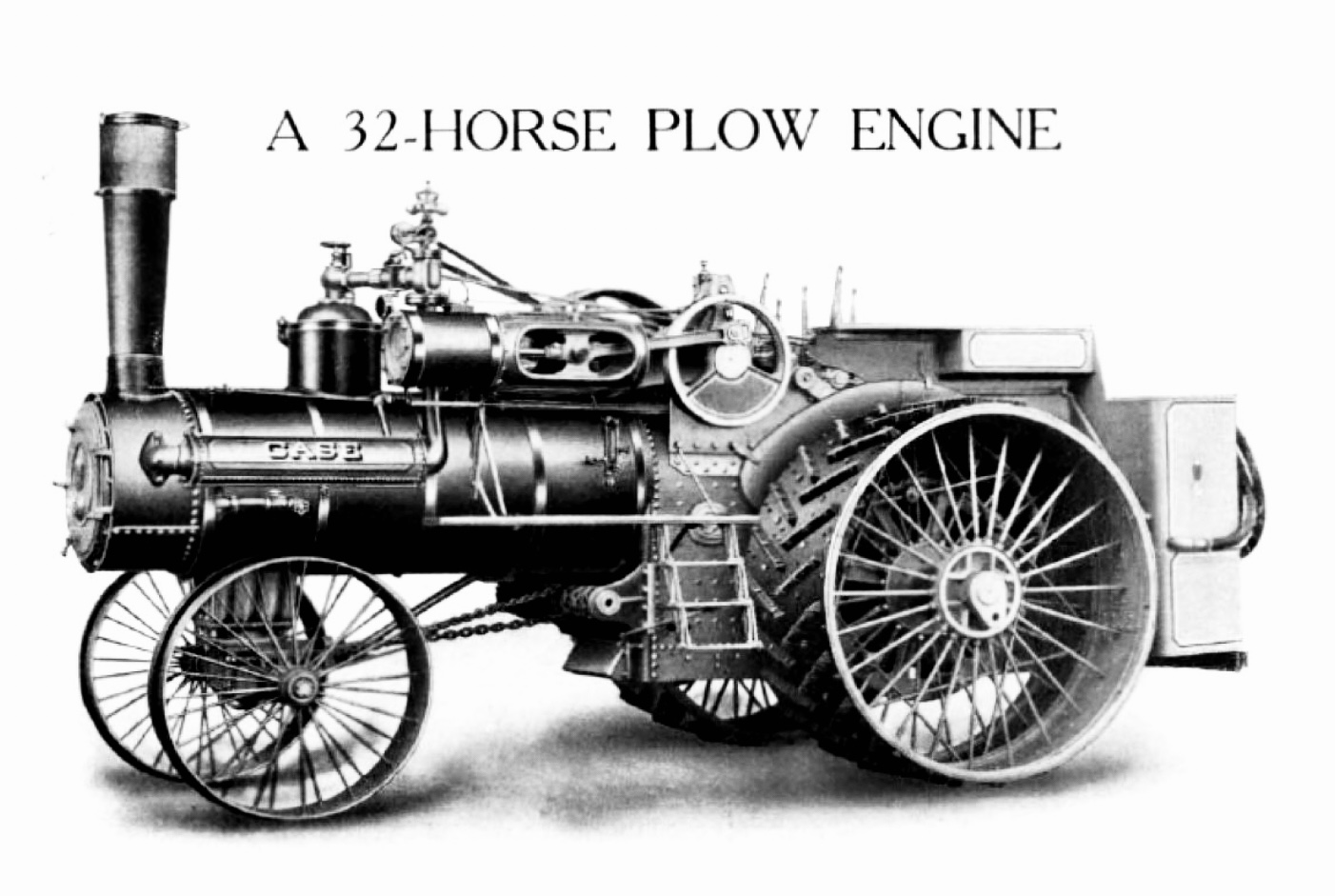
Case Simple 32 hp steam tractor (1909)

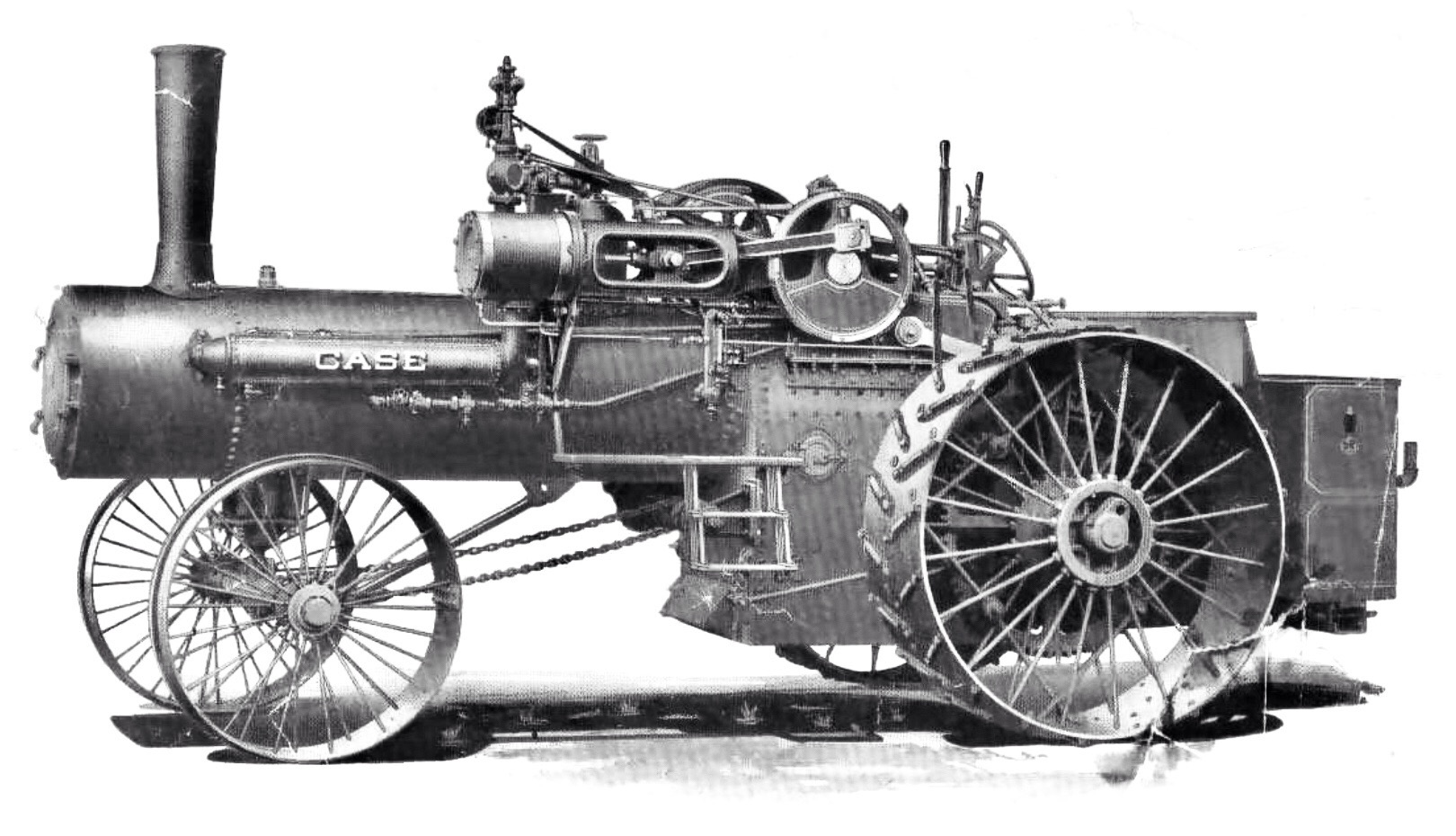
Case Simple 80 hp (1916)

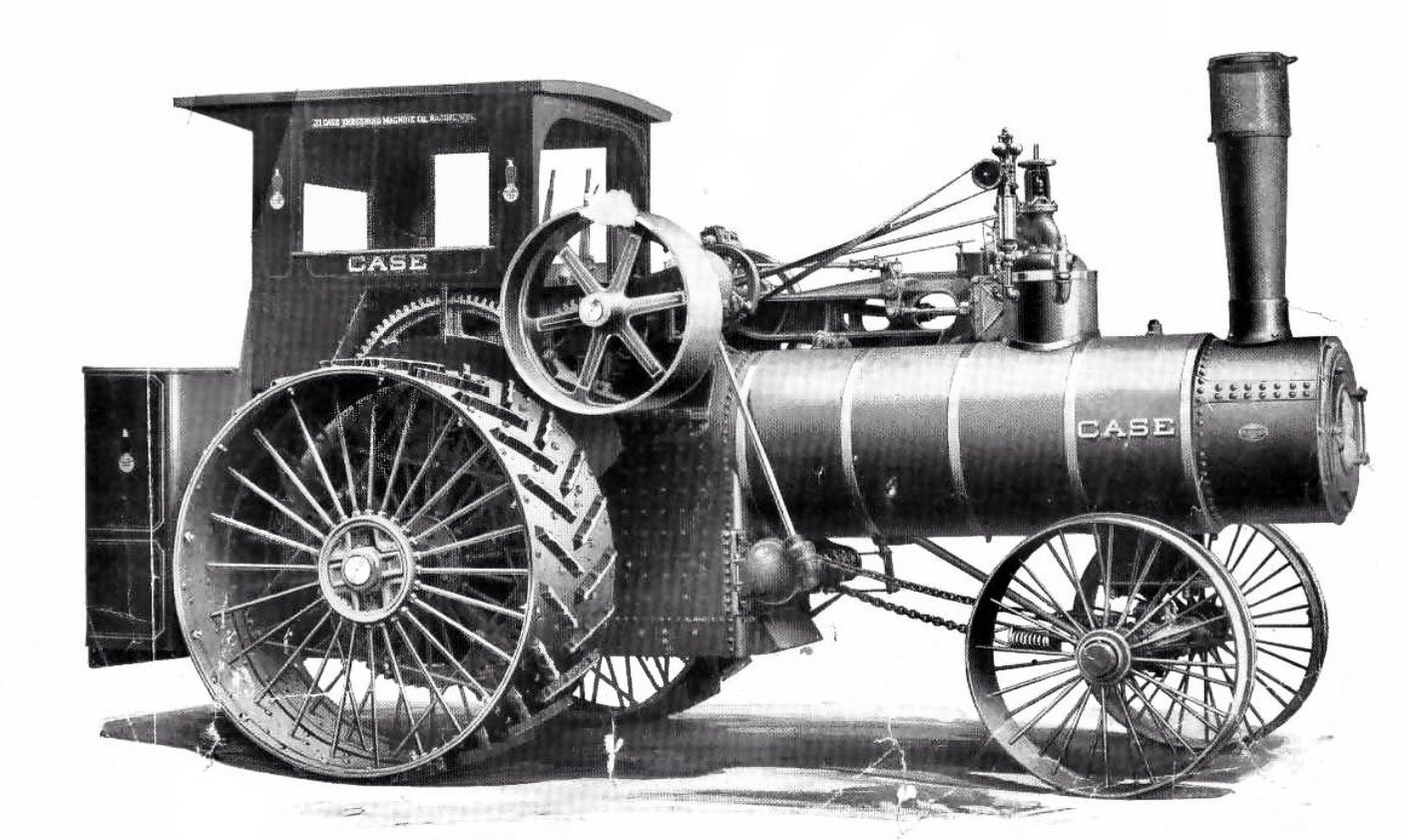
Case Simple 110 hp (1916)

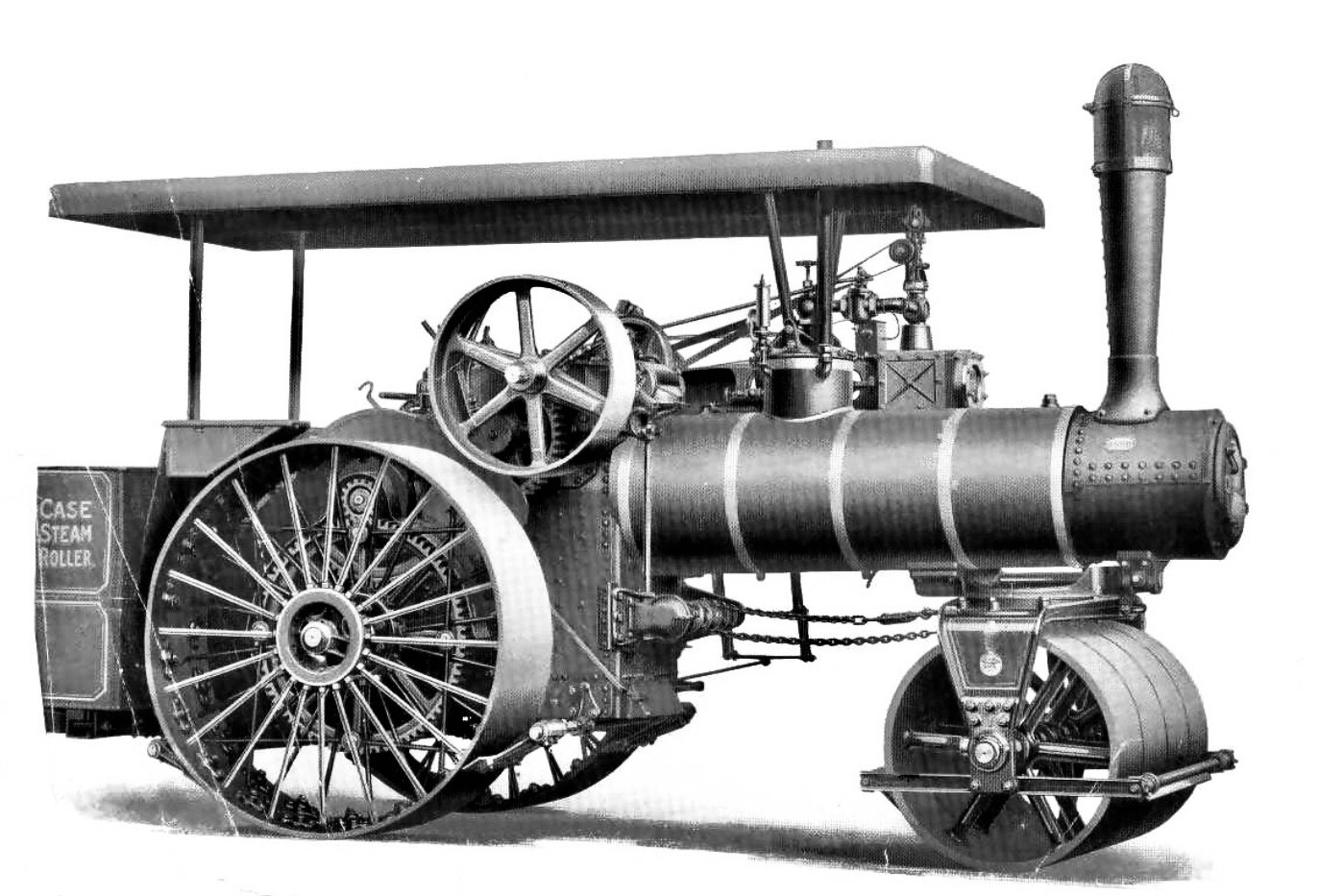
Case Simple or Compounded RR (Road Roller) 40 hp (1916)

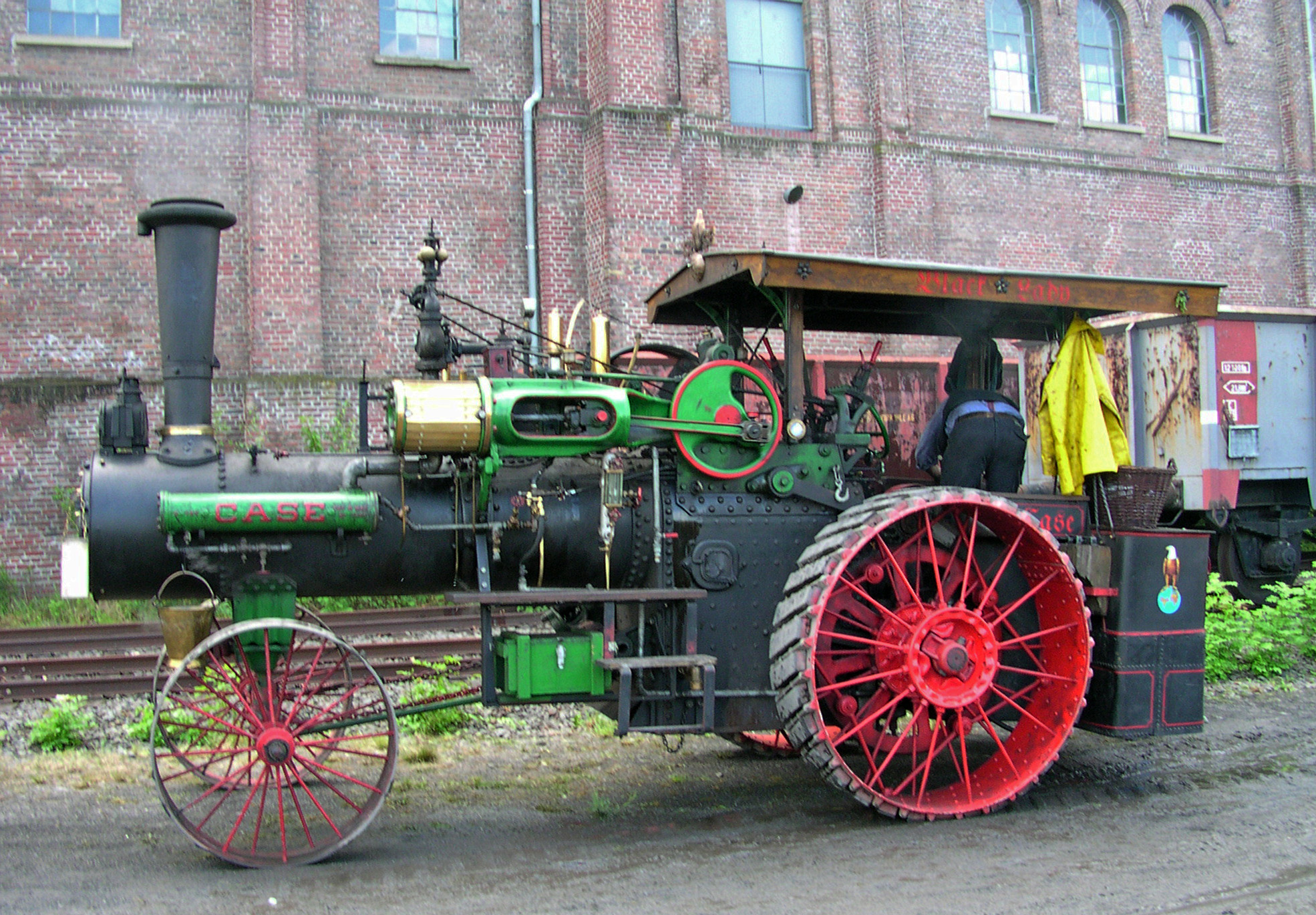
Case traction engine "Black lady" (1911) Serial number 25681

J. I. Case introduced an eagle logo for the first time in 1865 based on Old Abe, a Wisconsin Civil War Regiment's mascot. Case constructed his first portable steam engine in 1869, an engine used to power wheat threshers. This engine is in the Smithsonian Museum in Washington, D.C. Case won first place at the 1878 Paris Exposition in France for his thresher. This was the first thresher sent abroad by the Case company and was the first of thousands which would later be exported internationally. It is at this time that Case created his first self-propelled traction engine, with a drive mechanism on one of his portable engines.

Meanwhile, in 1871 the Great Chicago Fire destroyed the McCormick factory. Despite Case's offer to help McCormick with the manufacturing of their machines, McCormick Company refused the offer and a new facility, called the McCormick Works was built, in southwest Chicago. The McCormick company introduced the first of many twine binder machines in 1881, leading to the so-called "Harvester Wars" that gained the attention of the farm industry during the 1880s.

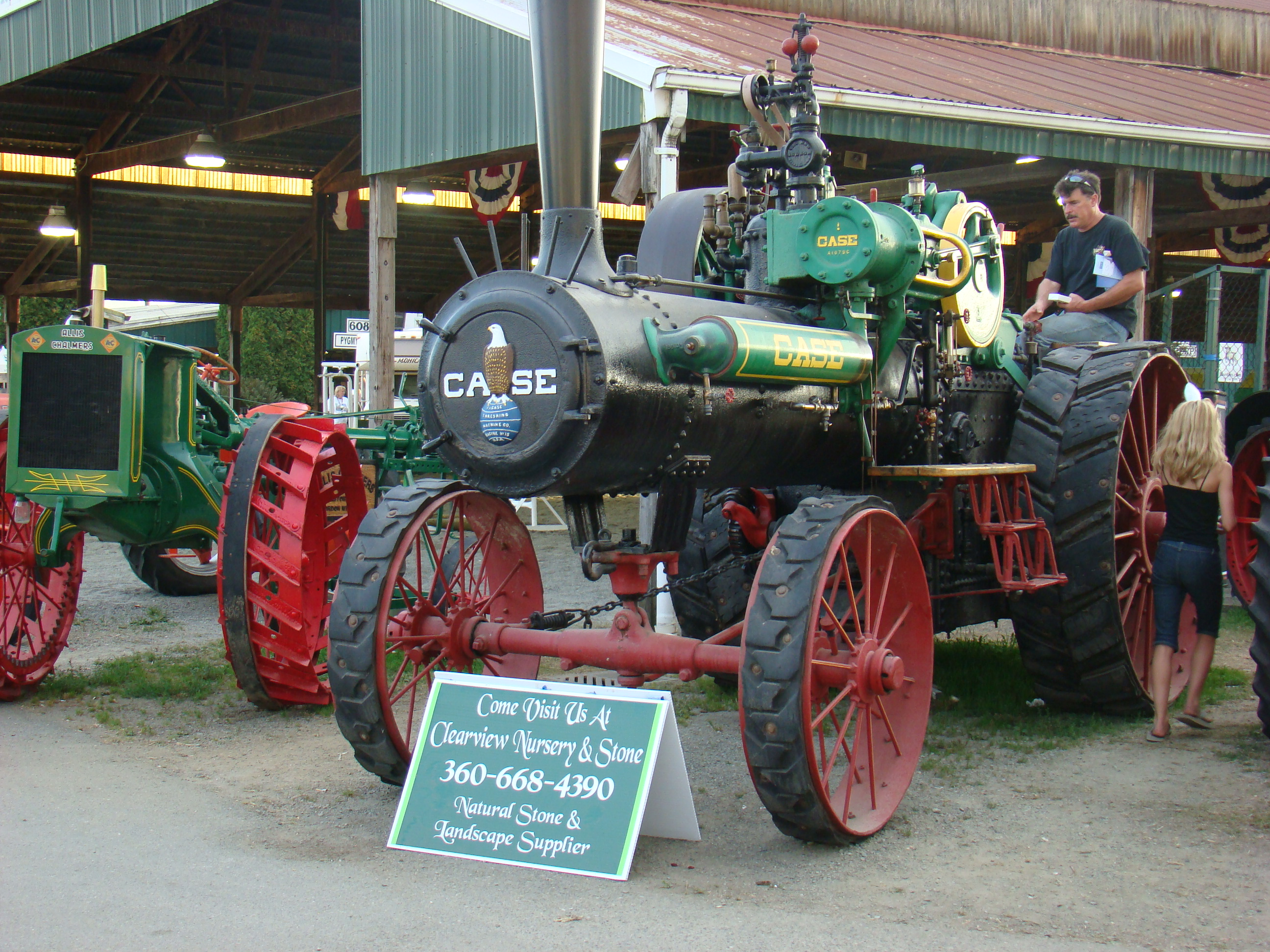
Case tractor.

In 1884, Case made a visit to a farm named after him in Minnesota upon receiving news that one of his thresher machines was not working. Infuriated by the fact that he could not fix the machine himself, he set it ablaze the next day, and sent the owner a brand new thresher machine upon return to Wisconsin.

In 1890, the Case Company expanded to South America, opening a factory in Argentina. In 1891, the company's founder died. By this time the Case company produced portable steam engines to power the threshing machines, and later went into the steam traction engine business. By the start of the 20th century, Case was the most prolific North American builder of engines. These engines ranged in size from the diminutive 9 HP, to the standard 15, 25, 30, 40, 50, 65 HP and up to the plowing 75 and 80 HP sizes. Case also made the large 110 HP breaking engines with its notable two-story cab. Nine massive 150 HP hauling engines were made, in addition to steam rollers. Case engines were noted for their use of Woolf valve gear, feedwater heaters, and the iconic "eagle" smokebox covers. Case had built a total of 36,000 steamers by the time it switched to gas tractors in 1927.

By 1902, five major American agricultural manufacturing companies decided that a consolidation was needed, and so the McCormick Harvesting Machine Company, the Deering Harvester Company, the Plano Manufacturing Company and two others merged their companies, rebranding the new company conglomerate as International Harvester Company, which became one of the giants of industry.

== Production figures steam tractors ==
Year	Production figures	Model	Serial number
1876	75		1-75
1877	109		76-184
1878	237		185-421
1879	244		422-665
1880	310		666-975
1881	411		976-1386
1882	506		1387-1892
1883	592		1893-2484
1884	302		2485-2786
1885	195		2787-2981
1886	182		2982-3163
1887	236		3164-3399
1888	280		3400-3679
1889	297		3680-3976
1890	456		3977-4432
1891	462		4433-4894
1892	572		4895-5466
1893	482		5467-5948
1894	199		5949-6147
1895	127		6148-6274
1896	346		6275-6620
1897	131		6621-6751
1898	343		6752-7093
1899	920		7094-8013
1900	1,032		8014-9045
1901	962		9046-10007
1902	1,831		10008-11838
1903	1,649		11839-13487
1904	1,262		13488-14749
1905	1,371		14750-16120
1906	2,021		16121-18141
1907	1,421	Simple; 9 hp; 12 hp; 15 hp; 20 hp; 25 hp; 32 hp; Compounded; 9 hp; 12 hp; 15 hp; 20 hp; 32 hp	18142-19562
1908	1,651		19563-21213
1909	1,657	Simple; 9 hp; 12 hp; 15 hp; 20 hp; 25 hp; 32 hp; Compounded; 9 hp; 12 hp; 15 hp; 20 hp; 25 hp	21214-22870
1910	1,407		22871-24277
1911	2,323	Black lady	24278-26600
1912	2,251		26601-28851
1913	1,917		28852-30768
1914	1,378		30769-32146
1915	952		32147-33098
1916	774	Simple; 18 hp; 30 hp; 40 hp; 50 hp; 65 hp; 75 hp; 80 hp; 110 hp; Compounded; 40 hp; 50 hp; 75 hp; 80 hp	33099-33872
1917	598		33873-34470
1918	4		34471-34474
1919	346		34475-34820
1920	434		34821-35254
1921	100		35255-35354
1922	154		35355-35508
1923	198		35509-35706
1924	130	40 hp; 50 hp; 65 hp; 80 hp	35707-35836
1925	1		35837
1926	1		35838
Sum	35,838		

=== Internal combustion tractors ===
By 1895, the Case Company had begun to produce gasoline engines. By 1899, the Case Company entered the Russian market.

In 1904, Case introduced the first all-steel thresher machine. Case sold their first gasoline tractor that year, and established a continuous presence in Europe when the company won the first place in a plowing contest held in the so-called "old continent". Case at this time developed a wide line of products: threshers, binders, graders, water tanks, plows, buggies, and even automobiles.

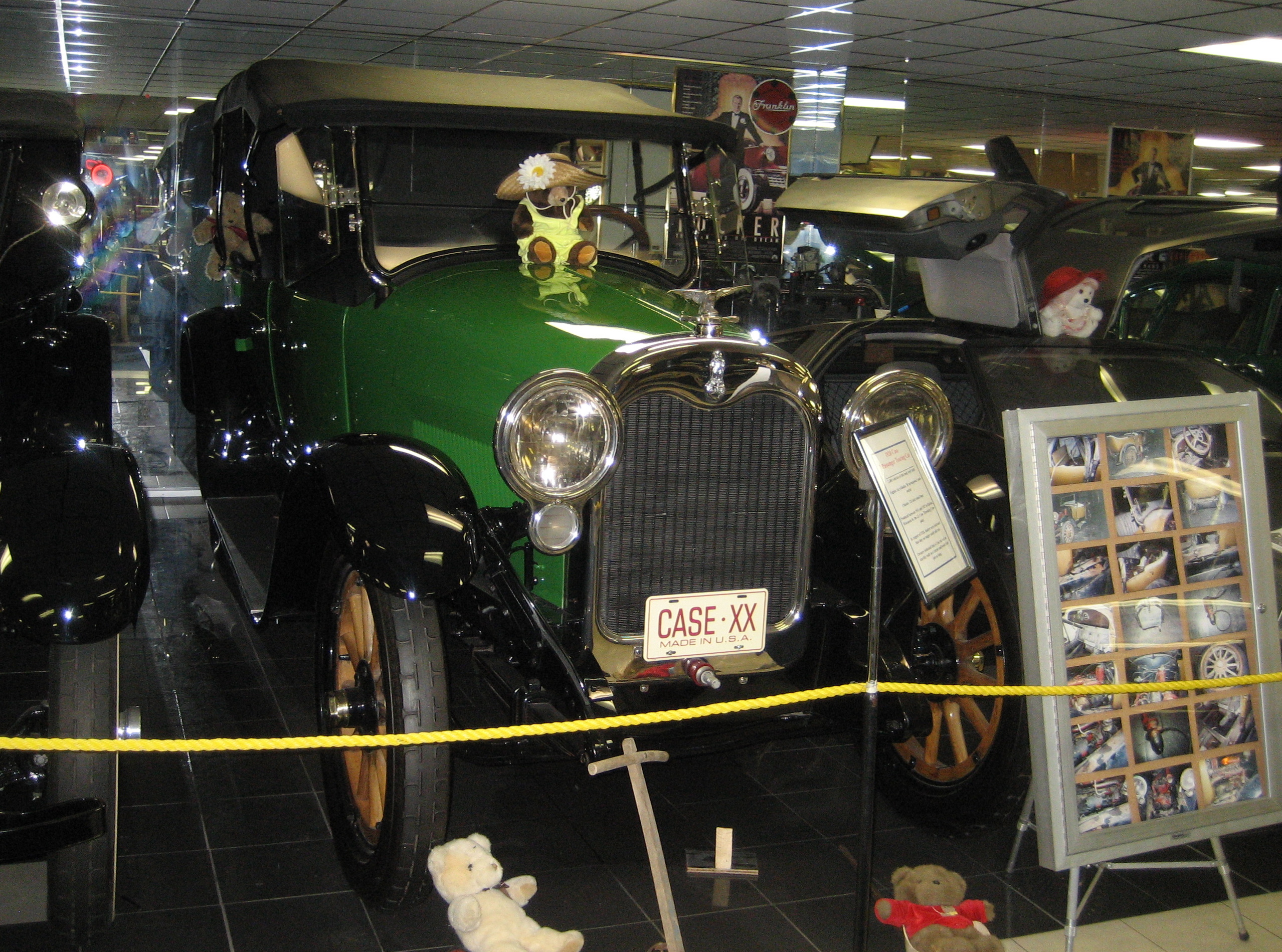
Case manufactured automobiles for a few years. A Case 1920 7-passenger touring car.

The advent of oil engines by the start of the 20th century, suggested a change on the horizon. From Froelich's first tractors to Hart-Parr products, oil tractors seemed the way ahead. Case hired Joe Jagersberger, and he tested a motor by racing in the 1911 Indianapolis 500. Case began production of the 30-60 oil engine in 1912. Case also produced kerosene tractors in the teen years, similar to the Rumely oil pulls. During World War I, Case's sales and demand grew dramatically in Europe. These increases were directly connected to the war; as many farm laborers became soldiers, each remaining farmer needed to become more productive, and machinery was the way to make this happen.

In 1919, John Deere entered the harvester business, and International Harvester's reply to their new competition was to purchase P&O Plowing of Canton, Illinois, and the Chattanooga Plowing company of Chattanooga, Tennessee. Henry Ford also entered the tractor business with his Fordson Tractor produced at the massive Rouge River plant. An economic downturn during the early 1920s dampened tractor sales; price-cutting to stimulate demand sparked a price war in the tractor industry (called the tractor war). Ford, with a massive advantage in manufacturing capacity and distribution, had the upper hand, producing an estimated 73 percent of all American tractors, with IHC in a far away second place at nine percent, and several other companies sharing the rest of the percentages. In 1923, the IHC Farmall entered the agricultural industry, and Ford's stranglehold began to slip. That same year also, the 100,000th thresher machine produced by Case made its way out of the assembly line, marking an important milestone for the Case company.

In 1927 the J. I. Case Company ceased building its legendary steam engines. Case steam engines, of which 35,838 were produced, were painted in black with green machinery, while the gas tractors were painted grey. In 1939, Case changed its color scheme to Flambeau Red, with the excavators being a ruddy yellow. By 1929, Case had expanded to Australia, Mexico, Sweden, and other countries. Also that year, the J. I. Case Company produced its first crawler tractor. S and V tractors were introduced in 1940.

=== Automobile production ===
Automobiles produced by Case during the period 1911-1925/1927 include: the Case Jay-Eye-See Brougham (named for Case's horse) and Case Touring-Y.

=== Work in the Second World War ===
Case evolved as World War II arrived by becoming involved in the manufacturing of shells for the United States and allied forces military, as well as airplane parts for the Martin B-26 Marauder, bombs, and doors for the Sherman Tank. Three new plants were opened across the United States during that year, and, in 1942, the company produced its first self-propelled combine. That same year, Case released the company's first cotton picker, which is currently preserved by the Smithsonian society. A protracted 440-day strike in Wisconsin of the Case factory weakened the company.

For the next 31 years, the company went through more globalization, becoming a well-known company in the agricultural markets of Australia, Japan, and other places. Many other companies joined Case during this period.

=== Modern mergers ===
In 1957, Case bought out the American Tractor Corporation (ATC). ATC was founded in 1950 and was a producer of small crawler tractors. Their production of dozers (marketed as Terradozers) and development of an integrated backhoe was of particular interest to Case. Case dropped the ATC name in 1959 only retaining the Terratrac name for the drive trains. This led to a hybrid tractor being rolled out of the Burlington Plant in 1957. This model, the 320 Construction King, would become synonymous in the United States to the name backhoe loader. Since then Case has released other models such as the T-Series which includes the 580T, 580ST, 590ST and 695ST. In 1998, a jury awarded a construction worker over $17million in damages after a defect in the design of the 580 backhoe led to him being crushed and being paralyzed from the waist down while operating the machine.

In 1961, Case Corporation signed a deal with RyCSA and Metalúrgica Tandil (in Buenos Aires), to make Case tractors and agricultural implements under licence in Argentina. The models built were the 830 and the 831, made until 1964 when RyCSA closed down.

1964 brought the acquisition of Colt Garden Tractors. This was the first garden tractor powered by 'Hy-Drive", a form of hydraulic propulsion that allowed for various heavy duty attachments and eliminated the need for transaxle drive belts. The Kern County Land Company, using oil money, bought the Case Company. In turn Kern County sold Case to Tenneco Company of Texas.

In 1972, Case bought the British tractor builder David Brown Ltd. In 1974, Case acquired most of the French construction equipment firm, Poclain.

In 1983, during purchase of International Harvester assets, Case sold its garden tractor division to Ingersoll Power Equipment. Ingersoll tractors would continue to carry the Case brand name until 1987.

In 1984, Case parent Tenneco bought selected assets of the International Harvester agriculture division and merged it with J. I. Case. All agriculture products are first labeled Case International and later Case IH. They used the 94 Series Case Utility, two- and four wheel drives for Case IH's first tractor together as a company. The first tractor developed by the new corporation was the Magnum. Introduced in 1987, the Magnum began production and the 94 series line was dropped.

When Case IH bought out Steiger in 1986 they also continued the Steiger branding, and still do today.

In 1996, Austrian tractor builder Steyr Tractor was purchased.

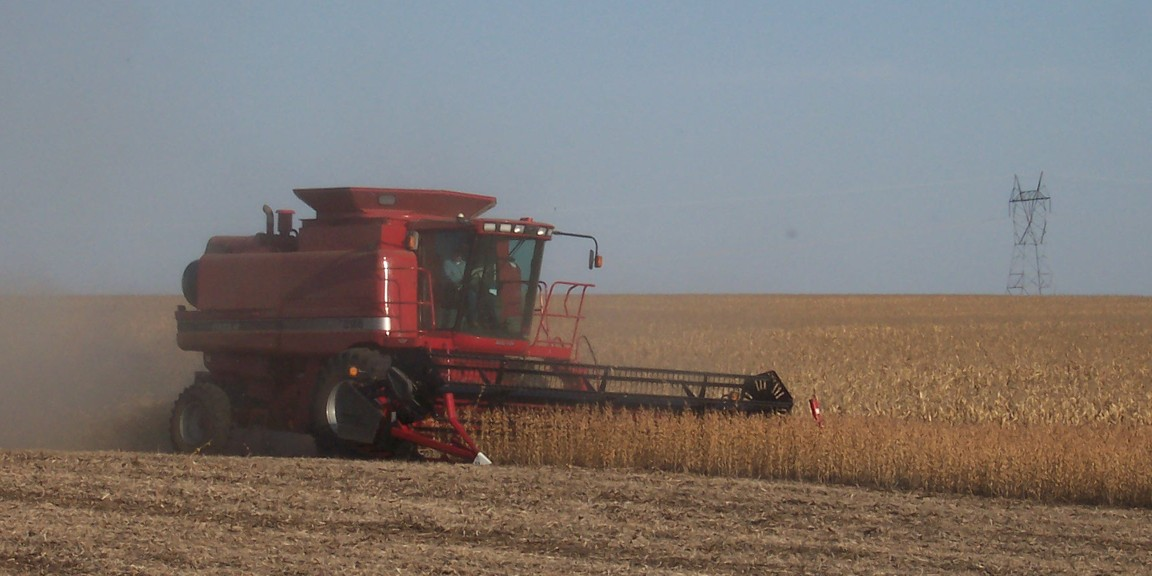
Case IH Combine circa 2006.

The Case Corporation joined with New Holland N.V. to become CNH (Case-New Holland), now CNH Industrial, in November 1999. Because of the merger, CNH was forced to release its production plants in Doncaster, England and Winnipeg, Manitoba, Canada. The Doncaster site was bought by the ARGO-group, owner of tractor builder Landini, and brought back the McCormick brand. The plant in Winnipeg was taken over by the Buhler family to start Buhler Tractors.

In Europe the merger with New Holland (including the former Fordson and Fiat tractor lines) was the success Case IH expected. In 2006, Case IH came with a plan to bring back the "International" feel to their products. They brought back the old International Harvester logo, and made more technical difference between the two brands. Montgomery Design International redid the industrial design and styling of the MAGNUM and several other new Case IH products as well as the New Holland "Cat's Eye" styling on all New Holland tractors and the revised Steyr tractor styling. These styling themes continue to this day.

== See also ==
- List of tractor manufacturers
- John I. Beggs
- J.I. Case Building in downtown Minneapolis, listed on the National Register of Historic Places
