= American Tractor Corporation =

American manufacturer of tracked type agricultural and industrial tractors

- Company type: Private
- Industry: Agricultural machinery; Construction equipment
- Founded: c. 1949
- Founder: Marc B. Rojtman
- Defunct: 1957 (acquired)
- Fate: Acquired by J. I. Case Company
- Successor: Case Corporation (industrial line)
- Headquarters: Churubusco, Indiana, U.S.
- Area served: United States
- Products: Crawler tractors (TerraTrac); dozers; loader–backhoes
- Brands: TerraTrac

American Tractor Corporation (ATC) was an American manufacturer of small crawler tractors and industrial equipment based in Churubusco, Indiana. During the late 1940s–1950s it produced the TerraTrac series of crawlers (including the GT-25 and GT-30) and developed backhoe equipment that J. I. Case later integrated into the Case Model 320 - widely credited as the first factory-integrated tractor loader backhoe introduced in 1957. ATC was acquired by J. I. Case in 1956–1957. Its president and largest stockholder, Marc B. Rojtman, became a Case executive and later president.

== History ==
In 1950 Marc Rojtman purchased the crawler manufacturing from Warren, Ohio based Federal Machine. He purchased a building in Churubusco, Indiana, to house his company and relocated the operation there. Working 15‑hour days along with his employees allowed ATC to grow by 1951 to $3 million in sales.

By the mid-1950s ATC was building six different chassis with equipment ranging from forklifts to earthmoving and even a three-point hitch, rare on crawler tractors.

In 1957 J. I. Case made an offer to merge ATC into Case. This was mutually advantageous as ATC had innovative designs but lacked a strong distribution network whereas Case had not had success in the crawler market, but had an international distribution network. Of particular interest to Case was the backhoe that ATC had developed for its machines. Within the year Case had married the ATC backhoe to a Case 300 series tractor with a loader creating the first factory built and integrated loader backhoe in the American market.

== See also ==
- Case Corporation
- Case 320
- Backhoe loader
