= Dynamic hyperinflation =

Dynamic hyperinflation is a phenomenon that occurs when a new breath begins before the lung has reached the static equilibrium volume. In simpler terms, this means that a new breath starts before the usual amount of air has been breathed out, leading to a build-up of air in the lungs, and causing breathing in and out to take place when the lung is nearly full.

== Asthma ==
Dynamic hyperinflation can occur in patients with asthma who are breathing spontaneously. It is a physiologic response to airflow obstruction and exists, to an extent, because increasing lung volume tends to increase airway caliber and can reduce the resistive work of breathing. However, in patients with severe asthma it becomes maladaptive, occurring at the expense of increased mechanical load and elastic work of breathing. Dynamic hyperinflation can cause alveolar overdistention resulting in hypoxemia, hypotension, or alveolar rupture. Dynamic hyperinflation increases the magnitude of the drop in airway pressure that the patient must generate to trigger a breath, thereby increasing the patient's workload.

=== Status asthmaticus ===
Patients with acute severe asthma exacerbations are at risk for progressive air trapping and alveolar hyperinflation, which may lead to alveolar rupture and hemodynamic compromise. Airflow obstruction during expiration slows lung emptying and inspiration may be initiated before exhalation is complete. The phenomenon that occurs when a new breath begins before the lung has reached the static equilibrium volume is called dynamic hyperinflation.

== Interventions ==
Interventions to correct air-trapping include decreasing the respiratory rate (increasing expiratory time), increasing inspiratory flow rates (decreasing the inspiratory time) and lowering the tidal volume.

=== Adults ===
In adults, it has been demonstrated that limiting minute ventilation is the key to avoiding dynamic hyperinflation; keeping the minute ventilation under 115/mL/kg is recommended.
