= Gunther Wolff =

Gunther Wolff

Gunther Wolff (November 12, 1932 – October 24, 1994) was a Swiss surgeon, intensive-care physician, and professor of surgery at the University of Basel. He became chief of surgical intensive care at the University Hospital of Basel in 1972, was a founding member of the Swiss Society of Intensive Care Medicine, and served as its president from 1975 to 1977. His research spanned cardiovascular monitoring, respiratory physiology, and mechanical ventilation.

== Early life and education ==
Wolff was born in Basel on November 12, 1932. He received his medical degree in Basel. In addition to his medical studies, he completed two years of pregraduate study in chemistry and a postgraduate year in physiology in Göttingen and Munich. He subsequently trained in general and cardiovascular surgery.

At Basel, Wolff trained under Rudolf Nissen, who was his academic mentor. In 1964, Wolff and Nissen coauthored a paper on colon cancer in older patients.

== Medical career ==
In 1972, Wolff became head of surgical intensive care at the University Hospital of Basel. Following the creation of the Department of Anesthesia, he relinquished operational management of the surgical intensive-care unit but continued to head the Division for Clinical Physiology within the Clinic for Cardiac and Thoracic Surgery, part of the Department of Surgery.

Wolff was one of the founding members of the Swiss Society of Intensive Care Medicine, established in Basel on February 4, 1972. He served as its president from 1975 to 1977. He advocated an interdisciplinary model of intensive-care medicine shared by anesthesiology, internal medicine, pediatrics, and surgical specialties.

He was also a member of the first editorial board of the journal Intensive Care Medicine and helped establish the publication internationally during its early years.

== Research ==
Wolff's main research interests were cardiovascular monitoring, respiratory physiology, and ventilatory support. His Clinical Physiology group brought together physicians and engineers, and they published studies about respiratory mechanics, including methods for continuously calculating intratracheal pressure, measuring compliance and resistance in patients with acute respiratory distress syndrome, and analyzing patient–ventilator desynchronization.

In the last years of his life, Wolff initiated work on automatic tube compensation (ATC), intended to offset the flow-dependent breathing resistance imposed by an endotracheal tube. A 1994 paper by Ben Fabry, Josef Guttmann, Luc Eberhard, and Wolff described a ventilatory mode that compensated for tube resistance during both inspiration and expiration. ATC was subsequently incorporated into commercial ventilators, beginning with the Dräger Evita 4 in 1997.

Wolff also wrote and edited books on mechanical ventilation, acute respiratory distress syndrome, and pulmonary-function measurement. His clinical handbook "Die künstliche Beatmung auf Intensivstationen" (Mechanical Ventilation in Intensive Care Units) was printed between 1975 and 1983 in three editions. His 1988 book "Pulmonary Function Indices in Critical Care Patients" with Josef X. Brunner presented experimental methods for measuring pulmonary function in critically ill patients.

== Research group and mentorship ==
Wolff was a respected bedside and classroom teacher. His students included Josef X. Brunner, Ben Fabry, and Luc Eberhard, and he mentored Josef Guttmann during his habilitation.

== Later life and death ==
Wolff was active in environmental protection in Basel. As a board member of Oekostadt Basel, he promoted dialogue between environmental campaigners and municipal authorities. In the 1989 Tour de Sol, Wolff competed with his wife in a two-seat Pinguin 7 electric car. They placed third in the VSE energy-efficiency category for production solar vehicles.

Wolff died following cardiac arrest on October 24, 1994.

== Selected works ==
- Wolff, Gunther (1978). Atmung und Beatmung: Ein Leitfaden für Schwestern und Pfleger (in German). With E. Grädel and H. Balmer (2nd revised ed.). Springer. doi:10.1007/978-3-642-67106-7. ISBN 978-3-540-09062-5.
- Wolff, Gunther; Keller, Roland; Suter, Peter M., eds. (1980). ARDS: Akutes Atemnotsyndrom des Erwachsenen / Adult Respiratory Distress Syndrome (in German). Springer. ISBN 3-540-09836-4.
- Wolff, Gunther (1983). Die künstliche Beatmung auf Intensivstationen (in German). With E. Grädel (3rd revised ed.). Springer. ISBN 978-3-540-12115-2.
- Brunner, Josef X.; Wolff, Gunther (1988). Pulmonary Function Indices in Critical Care Patients. Springer. doi:10.1007/978-3-642-73040-5. ISBN 978-3-540-18432-4.
