= American Thermoplastic Company =

American Thermoplastic Company Logo

American Thermoplastic Company (ATC) is an American manufacturer of binders and other plastics products.

ATC was founded in 1954 in Pittsburgh, Pennsylvania.
