= Academy for Technology and the Classics =

Coordinates: 35.583933°N 106.0127642°W

The Academy for Technology and the Classics

Location
- 74 A Van Nu Po Road; Santa Fe, New Mexico 87508; United States

Information
- Type: Charter school
- Established: 2000
- School district: Santa Fe Public Schools
- Principal: Jason Morgan
- Grades: 7-12
- Enrollment: approx 400
- Colors: Maroon, gold, red
- Mascot: Phoenix
- Newspaper: N / A
- Yearbook: Published each school year
- Website: http://www.atcschool.org/

The Academy for Technology and the Classics (ATC) is a charter school in Santa Fe County, New Mexico, United States, with a Santa Fe postal address.

== Education program and philosophy ==
The academy was founded in 2000 to provide a classical and technology-based approach to education in a public school setting. ATC was the third charter school established in Santa Fe, and the first in the city to open its doors to both middle and high school students.

ATC remains the smallest public high school in the Santa Fe area.

== History ==
ATC opened its doors to students in January 2001. Its first one and one-half years were in a building leased from and on the campus of the New Mexico National Guard. The school then moved to a portable classroom campus behind the Genoveva Chavez Community Center. The portable classrooms were provided by Santa Fe Public Schools and the other portable buildings (administration and restrooms) were leased by ATC. The land was made available by the city of Santa Fe.

In September 2007 the school opened the doors at a new permanent location. The new facility is located in Rancho Viejo near the Institute of American Indian Arts, and was constructed on privately donated land. Two buildings have been erected on the campus. The main building and the Phoenix Center, which hosts the cafeteria, kitchen and the Susan Lumley gymnasium, which was dedicated to the former principal in 2023.

During the 2010-2011 and 2011-2012 school years, ATC adopted a block schedule. However the school reverted to a fixed schedule with six periods per day in the 2012-2013 school year. Committees consisting of students, parents, and faculty members were created to weigh the benefits and detriments of the option, and the final decision was made by principal Odin Frostad, son of greg.

In 2011, the academy had its charter temporarily revoked, was put under financial and administrative rule of Santa Fe Public Schools, following an investigation in response to several scandals that emerged late in the 2010-2011 school year.

In the 2023-2024 school year, ATC re-adopted a block schedule.

== Student body ==
ATC's population for the 2010-11 school year was 420 students. The charter allows a maximum potential school population of 400 students, but in order to maintain the academic integrity of school, a small number of new students have been admitted each year.

ATC offers a free and reduced lunch program.

The ethnic breakdown is 52% Caucasian; 44% Hispanic; 1% Native American; 1% African American; 1% Asian American; and 1% Unknown.

The student/teacher ratio is 17/1.

== Notable programs ==
Instruction in French and Spanish which use both native speaking instructors and textbooks is available. Immersion sessions are available to help students grasp the foreign language of their choice. Three years of foreign language study are required for graduation, two in a row of which need to be in the same language.

ATC has a marimba. It has played at events including the National Charter School Conference, which was held in Albuquerque in 2007.

Junior and senior students participate in a dual enrollment program with the Santa Fe Community College, which allows them to take advanced courses and earn college credit.

== Accomplishments ==
As an academic leader ATC offers Advanced Placement courses in subjects including English, Government, History, Math, Spanish, etc. ATC offered its first AP course to ninth grade students in the 2012 school year when AP Environmental Science became available.

ATC Chess Team is led by faculty member Robert Mathis.

The school has been a strong competitor in Spelling and History Bees.

Cross-country at ATC trains on its beautiful course one of the finest in the state and hosts an annual preseason invitational each year for Santa Fe schools.

In 2007 ATC was selected as one of America's Best High Schools by U.S. News & World Report, receiving a Bronze Medal.

ATC has met Annual Yearly Progress, No Child Left Behind Requirements in 2005, 2006, 2007 and 2009.

80% of the school's graduates attend post-secondary schools. Graduates have received admission to universities that include Yale University, Princeton University, Stanford University and Dartmouth College. Students have been named Regent and President Scholars at the University of New Mexico.

== 2011 reorganization ==
Late in the 2010-2011 school year, ATC's Governing Council suspended the school's charter for one year and resigned en masse at the end of the year, opening the way for the Santa Fe Public School District, its chartering authority, to take responsibility for school governance for one year and oversee elections of a new Governing Board and initiate general policy changes.

Susan Lumley, a long-time school principal, realtor, and writer, was chosen by a committee of teachers, parents, and students to the principal position for the 2011-2012 school year.

The election of a new Governing Council took place in October 2011.
