= Advanced Technology College =

College in Daytona Beach, Florida, US

Coordinates: 29.231849°N 81.098306°W

- Established: 2001
- Location: Daytona Beach, Florida, United States
- Website: http://www.daytonastate.edu/catalog/facts/atc.html

The Advanced Technology College (ATC) is a four-year technical college located in Daytona Beach, Florida, in the United States. This technical college carries courses such as computer technology, construction, manufacturing, engineering, and automotive services.

The ATC is involved in a joint-partnership program with Volusia County and Flagler County school districts. The Advanced Technology Center provides high school students in their junior and senior years the ability to dual-enroll and receive college credits. There is no longer transportation to and from the home high schools to the ATC. The ATC also allows for adult students from Daytona State College to take courses at the ATC.
