= Steiger =

Steiger is a German word for "climber" or "mine manager". It may refer to:

== People ==
- Steiger (surname)

== Organizations ==
- Steiger (automobile company), a former German manufacturer
- Steiger Award, a German award
- Steiger Ferris Wheel, a transportable amusement ride
- Steiger (mining), an official or manager of a pit or mine
- Steiger Tractor, a former American manufacturer and brand

== See also ==
- Björn Steiger Foundation
- De Steiger, a surname
- Case STX Steiger
- Steigerlied, a German miner's song; see Steiger (mining)
