= Steiger (surname) =

Steiger is a surname originating in the ancient city and canton of Bern, Switzerland. In common German, a "Steiger" is a mining foreman (see Steiger). Notable people and fictional characters with this surname include:

- Allan Steiger, fictional character of the television soap opera Neighbours
- Anna Steiger (born 1960), British opera singer
- Bill Steiger (born c. 1933), American football player
- Brad Steiger (1936–2018), American author
- Captain Oskar Steiger, fictional character of the 1970 film Patton
- Douglas and Maurice Steiger, American farmers and founders of Steiger Tractor
- Eduard von Steiger (1881–1962), Swiss politician
- Emil H. Steiger (1871–1921), American businessman and politician
- Sophie and Harwood Steiger, American textile artists and printmakers
- Isabelle de Steiger (1836–1927), English painter, theosophist, occultist and writer
- Jakob Robert Steiger (1801–1862), Swiss politician and President of the Swiss National Council
- Janet Dempsey Steiger (1939–2004), American politician
- Joan Benedict Steiger (1927–2024), American actress
- Joel Steiger (1942–2021), American television producer, writer and director
- Johann Rudolf de Steiger (1778–1834), Swiss nobleman
- Kurt and Karl Von Steiger, Canadian professional wrestlers
- Lieuwe Steiger (1924–2006), Dutch football goalkeeper
- Niklaus Friedrich von Steiger (1729–1799), Swiss politician
- Otto Steiger (1909–2005), Swiss writer and radio news speaker
- Otto Steiger (1938–2008), German economist and professor
- Paul Steiger (born 1942), American journalist
- Pepper Steiger, fictional character of the television soap opera Neighbours
- Pierre-Enric Steiger, president of Björn Steiger Foundation
- Rand Steiger (born 1957), American composer, conductor and pedagogue
- Rod Steiger (1925–2002), American actor
- Rudolf Steiger (1900–1982), Swiss architect
- Sam Steiger (1929–2012), American politician, journalist, political pundit and rancher
- Siegfried and Ute Steiger, founders and owners of Björn Steiger Foundation
- Tobias "Dobbs" Steiger, fictional character of the television series Der Clown
- Ueli Steiger (born 1954), Swiss cinematographer
- William A. Steiger (1938–1978), American politician
- William R. Steiger (born 1969), worker at the U.S. Department of Health and Human Services
