= Otto Steiger =

Otto Steiger may refer to:

- Otto Steiger (writer) (1909–2005), Swiss writer and radio news speaker
- Otto Steiger (economist) (1938–2008), German economist and professor
- Otto Steiger (engineer) (1858–1923), Swiss engineer and designer of the Millionaire mechanical calculator

== See also ==
- Otto
- Steiger (surname)
