= Case IH axial-flow combines =

Type of combine harvester

Case IH 7140 rotary harvester with corn header with cutaway showing rotary threshing mechanism

Case IH axial-flow combines (also known as rotary harvesters) are a type of combine harvester that has been manufactured by International Harvester, and later Case International, Case Corporation, and CNH Global, used by farmers to harvest a wide range of grains around the world.

Introduced in 1977, these harvesters marked a departure from traditional combine harvester design, in that threshing and separation was performed mainly by a rotor, as opposed to the drum and straw walker type models used previously. This is shown in the image at right, where the bulk of the processing area is devoted to a cylinder, that spins and threshes grain from the grain heads and allows for far greater capacity than the previous drum and walker design of harvester. This increase in capacity has led to a significant productivity increase of harvesters and therefore farmers who use them.

The rotary design by International Harvester was the first of its kind to be mass-produced and its patent over the design gave IH a competitive advantage over its rivals, including John Deere, Massey Ferguson, New Holland, and others.

== Models ==
The following is a summary of the model development of the Case IH harvester to the present day.

=== The 14 series ===
International Harvester had launched the 15 series of conventional combine harvesters in 1968. In 1977, after extensive engineering efforts and a bottom up design, IH released the 1440 and 1460 models of rotary harvester. In 1978, the larger model 1480 was released, as well as the specialty models 1470 (for hillside operation), and the 1482, designed to be pulled behind a tractor with PTO capability. Further models were introduced as the series was developed including the 1420 in 1980.

=== The 16 series ===
In 1985, International Harvester and Case Corporation merged.

The 16 series was the first harvester series released by the new Case International and was an upgrade to the 14 series rather than a replacement. All models of the 14 series had 16 series equivalents, in the 1620, 1640, 1660, 1670, 1680 and 1682. In 1990, Case IH enlarged the cleaning area of the combines by using a longer shoe sieve, change decal styling, and removed the old IH diesel engine and replaced with a CDC engine. The CDC engines were made by Consolidated Diesel Corporation which was company 50% owned by Case IH and 50% owned by Cummins. The CDC engine designs were essentially identical to Cummins engines. The older combines are easy to tell apart from the newer machines due to the model number decal being around 2 feet by 1 foot in size and being placed directly below the top of the grain bin on each side.

=== The 16-4/6/8 series ===
Released in 1993 and 1994, the 16 series was again upgraded to the 16-4/6/8 series. Models included the 1644, 1666 and 1688, and incorporated many changes to improve processing capacity.

=== The 21 series ===
Tenneco demerged Case IH in 1995 and the new Case Corporation released the 21 series combine harvesters, comprising the 2144, 2166, 2188. These models represented a significant step forward in the model design featuring improved operator comfort, higher power engines and a range of other productivity and user ease improvements.

=== The 23/25 series ===
Making incremental improvements on the 21 series, the 23 series were quite similar to the 21 series featuring more upgrades to engine power and other improvements to harvester operation. The series began in 1998 and featured the 2344, 2366, 2377 and 2388 models. Starting with the model year 2005 combines, all combine production was moved from the original site in East Moline, Illinois to Grand Island, Nebraska. Many improvements were made to each model with facility change. The most notable improvement was moving the rotary fan screen from the rear of the machine to the right side like the original 14 series combines. The 2377 was produced to replace the 2366, when the production moved plants. For model years 2007 and 2008, Case IH produced the 25 series combines. The series consisted of the 2577 and 2588 which offered improvements in engine power and new paint and decals to the former 23 series combines.

=== The 010/120 series ===
In 1999, Case IH and New Holland AG merged to form CNH Global. As part of the post merger product simplification process, both harvester lines of Case IH and New Holland were based on a common basic platform, with each model then customized to the features usually found on each harvester (e.g. cabin, external paneling, coloring, decals etc.). These combine harvesters are manufactured in Grand Island, Nebraska

This series began with of the AFX8010 and AFX9010 for 2003 through 2006. These early AFX combines stand apart from the later 80/9010 due to their black cabs and unloading auger. In 2007, the model numbers dropped the AFX naming and were simply named 7010, 8010, and 9010. 7120, 8120 and 9120 models began in 2009 and ended after 2011 and were based on a 5.4m^{2} (7120) and 6.5m^{2} (8120/9120) cleaning area. Significant improvements were made to the design including replacing many chains and belts with hydraulic control, including the main rotor drive belt. This hydraulic drive also allowed the fitting of an in cabin rotor reversing mechanism, allowing operators to reverse the entire rotor and feeder house in the event of a blockage.

=== The 88 series ===
The 88 series continued the 23 series line in parallel to the 120 series, and consisted of the 5088, 6088 and 7088 models. This series had 5.48m^{2} of separation area. This series along with the 010/120 series' were the first combines with plastic/fiber glass body panels. The series was phased out of production in most markets until their last year of production in 2011.

=== The 130/230 series ===
In 2012, the 130/230 series was released. It has a Tier 4a/Tier 4 interim engine emissions control. This series has two sub-series with the difference based on total cleaning area. The 130 series machines were a direct successor to the last 88 series machines and still were mostly belt and chain driven. The smaller sub-series uses a 5.9m^{2} cleaning area and consists of the 5130 (Class V), 6130 (Class VI) and 7130 (Class VII) models. The larger sub-series uses a 6.1m^{2} cleaning area and consists of the 7230 (Class VII), 8230 (Class VIII) and 9230 (Class IX) models. The 230 series followed in the footsteps of the 010 and 120 series combines and consisted of mostly hydraulic driven threshing and cleaning systems.

=== The 4000 series ===
Based on the 23 series axial-flow harvesters, the 4000 series, 4077 and 4088 have been produced since 2014 at CNH Industrial's Harbin plant in China for the Chinese market.

=== The 140/150 and 240/250 series ===
The 140 and 150 series combines were improved versions of the previous 130 series combines. Starting with the 150 series, new decals were used. For the 2019 model year, Case IH offered retro looking paint jobs and decals for the 150 series. Case IH used an old IH shade of red, old IH style of decals, and painted the rims and top of the cab an old IH cream color.

The 240 and 250 series combines were improved versions of the previous 230 series combines. Starting with the 250 series, new decals were used. These combine harvesters are among the most efficient in the world, specifically the 9250. Coming with a FPT engine, optional front crawler tracks, pipe lengths (20-50 feet), grain hopper size (14000-24100 litres), rear axle lengths (30-44 inches), multiple rotor options for specific grain types, and a trailer hitch for a header trailer.
