= Millionär =

Millionär may refer to:

- "Millionär", a song by Die Prinzen
- The Millionaire (calculator), marketed as Millionär in German-speaking countries
- "Millionär", a song by Farid Bang

== See also ==
- Millionaire
