= Tenneco =

American automotive parts company

Tenneco, Inc.
- Type: Private
- Industry: Auto parts
- Founded: 1940; 86 years ago
- Headquarters: Northville Charter Township, Michigan, U.S. (Northville address)
- Key people: Jim Voss (CEO); Jeff Stafeil (CFO); Ed Yocum (senior vice president and General Counsel)
- Products: Ride control, emissions control, elastomer, Powertrain Components, Suspension, Brake pads
- Revenue: ▲$18.9 Billion
- Owner: Apollo Global Management
- Number of employees: 71,000
- Divisions: Clean Air, DRiV, Performance Solutions, Powertrain
- Website: tenneco.com

Tenneco, Inc. (formerly Tenneco Automotive and originally Tennessee Gas Transmission Company) is an American automotive components original equipment manufacturer and an aftermarket ride control and emissions products manufacturer. It is a Fortune 500 company that was publicly traded on the New York Stock Exchange since November 1999 until it was taken private in November 2022 by Apollo Global Management. Tenneco is headquartered in Northville Charter Township, Michigan.

== History ==
Tenneco's origin was in the Chicago Corporation, established about 1930. The Tennessee Gas Transmission Company (completely separate) had been formed in 1940.

The Chicago Corp merged into the Continental Chicago Corp in December 1930. Both were investment companies, owning bonds, preferred stocks and common stocks of dozens of industrial companies, railroads, public utilities, oil companies, etc. as well as U. S. treasury and foreign government bonds with a market value of approximately $70,000,000 in November 1930 and which generated about $5,650,000 income from interest and dividends in 1930. The Chicago Investors Corp (assets of $4,000,000) merged with Continental Chicago Corp (assets of $24,000,000) in December 1932 to form the Chicago Corp.

The Tennessee Gas & Transmission Co., subsidiary of Chicago Corp, in 1944 arranged for a $44,000,000 loan from the Reconstruction Finance Corporation. Chicago Corp made available an additional $8 million in loans and guaranteed cost overruns to a maximum additional $4,500,000 and agreed to purchase some of the RFC debt if TGT would be unable to repay installments at their serial maturities. Chicago Corp acquired a 50% interest in 6,400 acres and 2 completed wells in the Menefee (Texas) gas field from Salt Dome Oil Corp (33.11%) and the Pan American Production Co. (16.89%). TGT agreed to buy a minimum 10mmcfd over 20 years at 5 cents, 6 cents, 7 cents and 7.5 cents per mcf during each 5-year period.

=== Natural gas ===
A shortage of fuel for World War II defense industries in the Appalachian area developed when industrial production was increased. The nuclear development operations of the Manhattan Project at Oak Ridge, Tennessee consumed huge quantities of Tennessee Valley Authority electrical power that would have otherwise been available to other industrial operations. The Chicago Corporation was able to acquire a Federal Power Commission (FPC) license to build a pipeline from Texas to Appalachia, eventually expanding to the largest natural gas pipeline network in the United States. These pipelines were acquired by El Paso Corporation in 1996, and are now owned by Kinder Morgan.

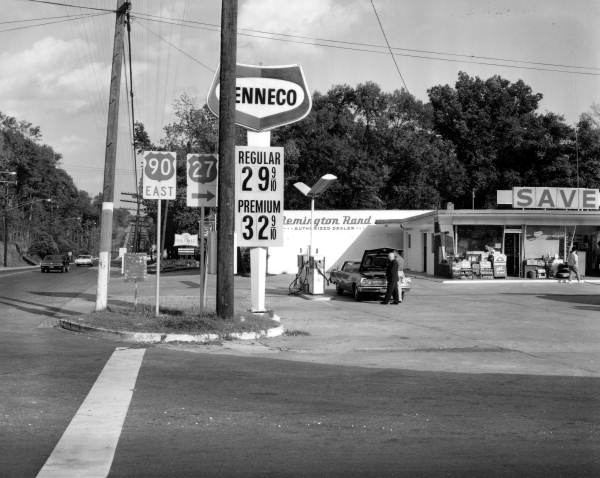
A Tenneco filling station in Tallahassee, Florida in 1967.

=== Diversification ===
In the 1950s, the company acquired existing oil companies, including Sterling Oil, Del-Key Petroleum, and Bay Petroleum. The Tennessee division of the Chicago Corporation acquired Tennessee Gas Transmission Company in 1943 to build a natural-gas pipeline 1,265 miles (2,036 km) from Texas to West Virginia. The first line was completed in October 1944. It was followed by three additional pipelines totaling 3,840 miles (6,180 km) during the next 15 years, which provide gas to New York and New Jersey.

In 1966, Tennessee Gas was incorporated as Tenneco, Inc. Tenneco expanded into a number of business ventures as a result of diversification. In 1967, the company acquired Walker, Inc., a manufacturer of universal-fit exhaust mufflers and pipes. The year after, they started working on the construction of a universal-fit catalytic converter, that would become a cost-effective alternative to the OE catalytic converters. It took the company 8 years to introduce one. Tenneco bought Houston Oil & Minerals Corporation with two gold mines in Nevada in the late 1970s. Tenneco owned and operated a large number of gasoline service stations, but all were closed or replaced with other brands by the mid-1990s.

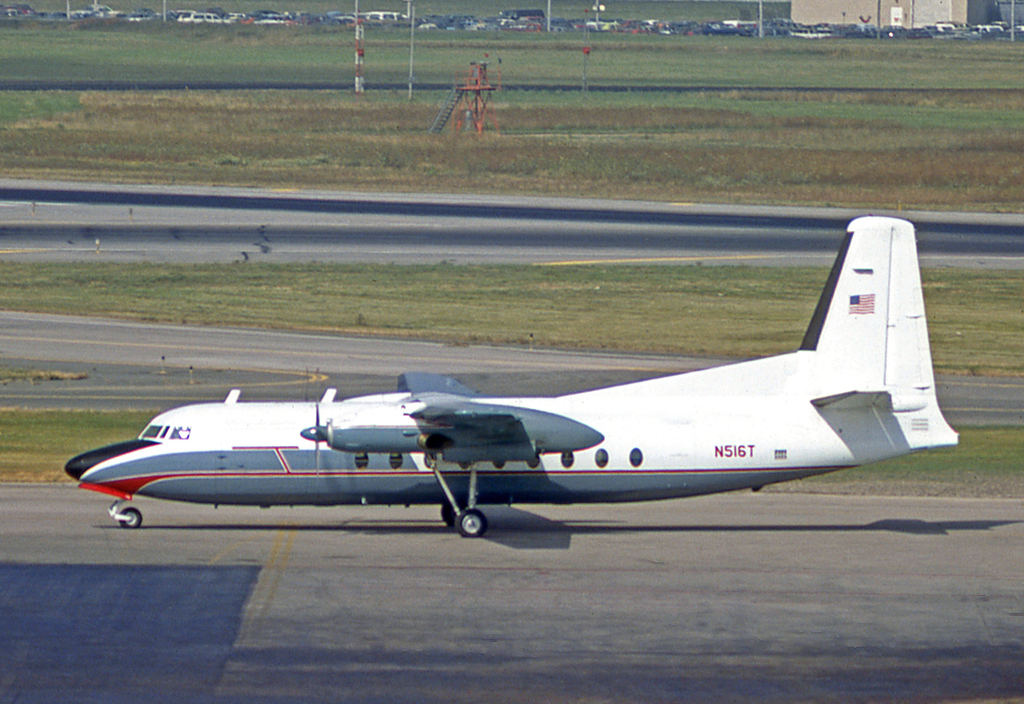
Fairchild F-27J executive aircraft of Tenneco at Chicago O'Hare Airport in 1979. The company also operated British Aircraft Corporation BAC One-Eleven jet aircraft in executive configuration.

In the 1970s, Tenneco purchased 53% of J.I. Case when they purchased its owner, Kern County Land Company, the agricultural equipment manufacturer based in Racine, Wisconsin, USA. In 1972, Tenneco purchased UK-based David Brown Tractors, and merged it with the J.I. Case business. In 1984, Case parent Tenneco bought selected assets of the International Harvester agriculture division and merged it with J.I. Case. All agriculture products are first labeled Case International and later Case IH. Tenneco purchased the articulated 4WD manufacturer Steiger Tractor in 1986, and merged it into Case IH.

The new corporate direction was to buy failing companies in a variety of industries, and then to develop them into profitable businesses. This worked well with Newport News Shipbuilding, but failed miserably with the various tractor companies, probably due in large part to the economy at the time. By 1988, the company was losing $2 million per day. After being pressured by the banks, it was decided to sell off the oil business. Tenneco Oil Exploration Company was split up and sold off to multiple buyers.

By 1994, Tenneco decided to begin getting out of the agricultural business and agreed to sell 35% of the now named Case Corporation. In 1996, the spin-off of Case Corporation was completed. The company was acquired by Fiat in 1999 and merged with New Holland Agriculture to form CNH Global.

=== Consolidation ===
Tenneco Inc. emerged from a conglomerate consisting of six unrelated businesses: shipbuilding, packaging, farm and construction equipment, gas transmission, automotive, and chemicals. The automotive division was spun off from Tenneco, Inc. in 1991 along with the packaging, energy, natural gas, and shipbuilding divisions. All businesses except automotive and packaging were disposed of between 1994 and 1996 (through public offerings, sales, spin-offs and mergers). In 1999, Tenneco Packaging was spun off and renamed to Packaging Corporation of America and Pactiv Corporation.

Since the 1960s, Tenneco Automotive has sold mufflers (UK: silencers) in Europe, including through the Pit Stop chain in Germany. The group bought a German factory in Viernheim in 1969, Swedish Starla at Vittaryd in 1974, French Bellanger at Laval, English Harmo Industries, east of Birmingham, in 1976 and Danish Lydex at Middelfart in 1978. More acquisitions followed.

On October 28, 2005, Tenneco Automotive was renamed as Tenneco.

==== Federal Mogul and Öhlins acquisitions ====
On October 1, 2018, Tenneco completed its acquisition of Federal-Mogul, a large global supplier to original equipment manufacturers and the aftermarket. The following month, Tenneco bought a majority stake in Öhlins for $160 million.

In February 2019, Tenneco announced that it would spin off its automotive aftermarket suspension components into DRiV Incorporated.

In October 2024, Tenneco agreed to sell Öhlins to Brembo for $405 million.

==== Acquisition by Apollo Global Management ====
On February 23, 2022, Tenneco announced that it had entered into a definitive agreement to be acquired by Apollo Global Management for $7.1 billion. The acquisition was completed in November 2022.

== Operations ==
Tenneco is a multi-national corporation with 93 manufacturing facilities in 26 countries located on 6 continents, with major centers of operations in the Americas, Europe, India and Asia. The North American manufacturing facilities are located in Arkansas, Alabama, Illinois, Indiana, Michigan, Missouri, Nebraska, Tennessee, Ohio, United States, and Cambridge, Ontario, Canada; the corporate headquarters is located in Northville, Michigan, European facilities in Belgium, Poland, Czech Republic, Germany, UK, France, Spain and Portugal, with headquarters located in Belgium, Asian facilities include in India, China, Singapore and Japan, and African Facility includes South Africa's Port Elizabeth.

Tenneco owns the following brands:

- Axios
- Champion
- Clevite Elastomers
- DynoMax
- Federal-Mogul
- Ferodo
- Fel-Pro
- Fonos
- Fric-Rot
- Kinetic
- Monroe
- MOOG
- National Oil Seals
- Rancho
- Sealed Power
- Thrush
- Wagner Electric
- Walker

Tenneco formerly owned the following brands:

- Öhlins, sold to Brembo on January 2, 2025

These are sold to over 500 after-market customers including retailers and wholesalers and to more than 25 OEMs, including Audi, BMW, Caterpillar, Fiat, Ford Motor Company, General Motors, Honda, Navistar International, Jaguar Land Rover, Mahindra & Mahindra, Maruti Suzuki, Mazda, Mercedes-Benz Group, Nissan, Porsche, PSA Peugeot Citroën, Renault, Royal Enfield, SAIC Motor, Škoda, Stellantis, Suzuki, Tata, Toyota, TVS, Volkswagen Group, Volvo Cars, E-Z-GO, and CLUB CAR.

== Controversy ==
During the 2022 Russian invasion of Ukraine, reports surfaced that Tenneco had failed to join other "international" (mainly Western) businesses by withdrawing from the Russian market. Research from Yale University updated on April 28, 2022, identifying how companies were reacting to Russia's invasion identified Tenneco in the worst category of "Digging In", meaning Defying Demands for Exit: companies defying demands for exit/reduction of activities.

== Locations ==
=== United States ===
Alabama

- Athens, Alabama - Products: Multi-layer Steel Engine Gaskets

Arkansas

- Paragould - Products: Shock absorbers, struts. Facility closure was announced in JAN 2025 and planned to be completed by 30 APR 2025.

Illinois

- Skokie - global headquarters of DRiV Incorporated, which owns the Monroe, Monroe Axios, Rancho, Fric-Rot, MOOG, QuickSteer, TS, Wagner, Ferodo, Jurid, Abex, Necto, Beral, Fel-Pro, Payen, National, Goetze, Nüral, Sealed Power, FP Diesel, AE, Glyco, Walker, DynoMax, Fonos, Thrush, Champion, Beck/Arnley, and Garage Gurus brands

Indiana

- Angola - Elastomeric Products: Heavy duty/Automotive products, spring eye bushings, fluid bushings, torque rod assemblies, links, & V-rods.
- Elkhart - Manufacturing plant that primarily makes exhaust components for other Tenneco facilities. The Elkhart plant is the only manufacturing plant that is owned (rather than leased) by Tenneco.
- Ligonier - Manufacturing facility that makes full exhaust systems and related components for Ford Motor Company, Chrysler, and Honda. Ligonier is one of the plants that has its own tubemill which accepts steel coil, gradually rolls it into a pipe and then welds the seam shut. This newly formed pipe is then cut to length and used within the plant or shipped as-is to other Tenneco plants.

Michigan

- Litchfield - Manufacturing facility that makes full exhaust systems and related components. This plant has its own tubemill, which accepts steel coil, gradually rolls it into a tube, and welds the seam shut. This newly formed pipe is cut to length and used within the plant or shipped as-is to other Tenneco plants.
- Marshall - Manufacturing facility that makes full exhaust systems and related components for Ford Motor Company, Chrysler, and General Motors. Marshall is one of the plants that has its own tubemill, which accepts steel coil, gradually rolls it into a tube, and then welds the seam shut. This newly formed pipe is cut to length and used within the plant or shipped as-is to other Tenneco plants. The Marshall facility is also equipped with multiple high-speed automatic muffler assembly lines.
- Monroe Charter Township - Houses the North American business unit, which consists of almost 500 employees involved in multiple disciplines such as design, product engineering, sales, and marketing.

Missouri

- Kansas City - Manufacturing facility that makes full exhaust systems and related components for Ford and General Motors.

Nebraska

- Seward - Manufacturing facility that makes full exhaust systems and related components for CAT, Chrysler, General Motors, John Deere and Harley-Davidson. Seward is one of the plants that has its own tubemill, which accepts steel coil, gradually rolls it into a tube, and then welds the seam shut. This newly formed pipe is cut to length and used within the plant or shipped as-is to other Tenneco plants.

Ohio

- Milan - Products: suspension bushings, cab mounts, steering system bushings, exhaust isolators, rubber compound
- Napoleon - Products: anti-vibration bushings and suspension links

Tennessee

- Smithville - Products: Automotive parts

Virginia

- Harrisonburg - Aftermarket exhaust

=== International ===
Argentina

- Rosario - Monroe Fric Rot - Shock absorbers
- Buenos Aires - Walker - Products: Muffler (silencers), Catalysts, exhaust systems

Australia

- Edinburgh Park, Adelaide - Products: exhaust systems
- Monroe, Tonsley, Adelaide - Products: shock absorbers, struts
- Walker, O'Sullivan Beach, Adelaide - Products: emission control
- Monroe Springs, Sydney - Products: coil and leaf springs

Belgium

- Sint-Truiden - EU headquarters Ride Control division; METC, the EU design and development center; largest ride control plant in Europe; products: shock absorbers, powdered metal components, press parts

Brazil

- Cotia, São Paulo (Axios) - Products: engine mounts, shock absorber bushings, and dampers
- Moji-Mirim, São Paulo (Monroe, Walker) - Products: exhaust automotive systems and shock absorbers
- Três Corações, Minas Gerais (Federal-Mogul) - Products: combustion engine valves
- Santo André, São Paulo (Federal-Mogul) - Products: combustion engine valves
- Araras, São Paulo (Federal-Mogul) - Products: pistons and camshafts
- Manaus, Amazonas (Federal-Mogul) -

Canada

- Cambridge, Ontario - Exhaust systems and components. This facility has its own tubing mill.

China

- Suzhou - Products: elastomer products

Czech Republic

- Hodkovice nad Mohelkou – Products: shock absorbers (Monroe), exhaust systems; engineering centre
- Kostelec nad Orlicí – Products: brake friction materials (Federal-Mogul)
- Dačice – Products: engine valves (Federal-Mogul)
- Brno – Technical and engineering centre (DRiV)

Germany

- Edenkoben - Products: exhaust systems

Hungary

- Kecskemét - Products: Exhaust systems

India

- Bawal - Products: struts, shock absorbers, front fork
- Pune - Products: muffler (silencers), catalytic converter, complete exhaust systems
- Hosur - Products: struts, shock absorbers, front fork
- Pithampur - Products: Exhaust System (Catalytic Converters)
- Chennai - Products: Exhaust System (Catalytic converters)

Mexico

- Aguascalientes, Aguascalientes - Exhaust Systems
- Aguascalientes, Aguascalientes -(Federal-Mogul) Products: combustion engine valves (Ford, GM, Volkswagen, CAT, Hyundai, Mercedes Benz)
- Celaya, Guanajuato - Shock absorber (struts)
- Puebla, Puebla - Exhaust Systems
- Reynosa, Tamaulipas - Products: bushing silentbloc, bonded products, Clevebloc products, STA Bars, control arm links, engine mounts

Poland

- Rybnik - Emission control engineering and manufacturing
- Gliwice - Shock absorber (struts) plant with Engineering Centre (EEEC) in Gliwice, near Katowice
- Stanowice

Portugal

- Palmela - Products: Exhaust systems (JIT Plant) VW Autoeuropa.

Spain

- Ermua - Products: shock absorbers, elastomers, and complete exhaust systems
- Valencia

South Africa

- Port Elizabeth - producing Shock Absorbers under the Monroe brand

== See also ==
- Pine Mountain Club, California, a Tenneco West residential development
