= Case IH =

American agricultural machinery manufacturer

- Formerly: Case International (1985-1999)
- Type: Subsidiary
- Industry: Agricultural machinery
- Predecessors: J.I. Case Company, International Harvester
- Founded: 1985; 41 years ago
- Headquarters: Racine, Wisconsin, U.S.
- Area served: Worldwide
- Products: Tractors; Combines; Forage equipment Hay tools Seeding & Tillage equipment Sprayers
- Parent: CNH Industrial
- Website: www.caseih.com

Case International Harvester, or short Case IH, is an American agricultural machinery manufacturer. It was created in 1985 when Tenneco bought selected assets of the agricultural division from International Harvester and merged it into its J.I. Case Company (IH then became Navistar). Today Case IH is owned by CNH Industrial, an American-Italian corporation.

== Products ==
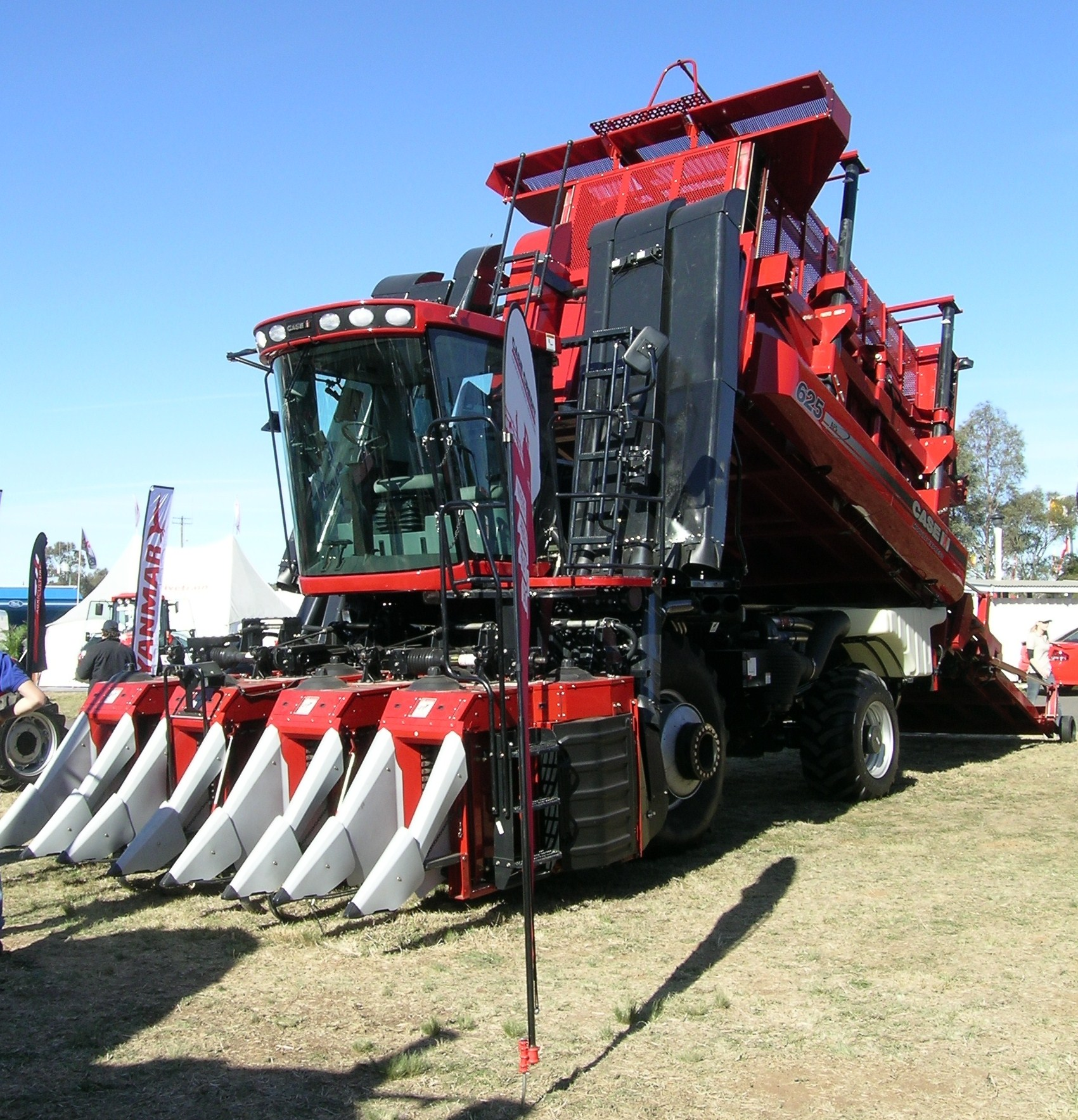
The Case IH Module Express 625 picks cotton and simultaneously builds cotton modules.

Case IH offers agricultural equipment, financial services, and parts and service support for farmers and commercial operators through a network of dealers and distributors.

Productivity-enhancing products include tractors, combines, and harvesters; hay and forage equipment; tillage tools; planting and seeding systems; sprayers and applicators; and site-specific farming tools.

Case IH has won many AE50 awards from the American Society of Agricultural and Biological Engineers, ASABE, for their products.

Some of Case IH's most famous equipment models include Axial-Flow combines, Magnum tractors, Steiger and Farmall.

== History ==
Case IH history began when, in 1842, Jerome Case founded Racine Threshing Machine Works on the strength of his innovative thresher. In 1869 Case expanded into the steam engine business and, by 1886, Case was the world's largest manufacturer of steam engines. The company's founder died in 1891 at the age of 72.

In 1892, Case was the first company to build a diesel-powered tractor.

In 1911, The J.I. Case Company had three cars in the first Indianapolis 500.

In 1967, Tenneco purchased J.I. Case, continuing to market the products under the Case name.

=== TIMELINE: 1970 - 2024 ===
- 1970 First of the IH World Wide range introduced: 454 and 574 models.
- 1971 IH 946 and 1046 launched and built in Germany.
- 1972 Tenneco buys David Brown Tractors of Yorkshire, which becomes part of J I Case.
- 1972 Case Traction King 2470 and 2670 introduced with equal-sized wheels and four-wheel steering.
- In 1973, they purchased British tractor manufacturer David Brown and used this acquisition to enter the UK tractor market, ultimately incorporating the DB developed 94 series into its own range of high HP tractors.
- 1977 IH launches the 84 Series plus the 955 and 1055.
- 1977 IH launches Axial-Flow rotary combine.
- 1979 David Brown 90 Series tractors launched, built in both Yorkshire and Racine.
- 1979 IH 2+2 articulated tractors launched in USA.
- 1981 IH 1455XL launched.
- 1981 First IH 85 Series models launched, including the option of XL cab.
- 1981 IH 5288 launched in USA.
- 1983 David Brown name disappears with introduction of 94 Series tractors.
- 1985 Tenneco buys IH in last weeks of 1984 and new Case IH corporate identity arrives in 1985.
- 1986 Case IH buys North Dakota-based Steiger.
- 1987 Launch of the Case IH Magnum 7100 range, the first under the new name.
- 1988 The erstwhile David Brown factory in Meltham, Yorkshire is closed.
- 1988 Case IH Steiger 9100 Series launched.
- 1990 Case IH Steiger 9200 series launched.
- 1990 Case IH Maxxum 5100 range launched and built in former IH factory in Neuss, Germany.
- 1993 Case IH Maxxum 5150 Plus introduced.
- 1996 Case IH 9300 Series launched.
- 1996 Case IH buys Steyr in Austria and adds CS models to range.
- 1996 Case IH Maxxum Pro range launched.
- 1996 Case IH acquires Austoft, an Australian manufacturer of sugarcane harvesters.
- 1997 Case IH Quadtrac 9370 launched with four rubber track units.
- 1997 Case IH Magnum Pro range launched.
- 1997 Case IH MX Maxxum range launched, built at Doncaster.
- 1999 Case IH Magnum MX range launched built at Racine.
- 1999 Case IH bought by Fiat and merged into the new CNH.
- 2000 Case IH STX range launched.
- 2002 Case IH CVX continuously-variable transmission tractors built by Steyr.
- 2003 Case IH MXM Maxxum models launched, built in Basildon to replace. MX range now built by McCormick
- 2003 Case IH MXU Maxxum range launched with new Horizon cab.
- 2006 Production of majority of Case IH tractors built at Basildon moved to Steyr’s St. Valentin factory in Austria.
- 2006 Puma range launched.
- 2006 New Magnum models launched.
- 2010 More powerful Magnums with outputs up to 389hp.
- 2015 Case IH Magnum Rowtrack introduced.
- 2015 Case IH Optum models launched.
- 2016 Autonomous concept vehicle revealed .
- 2024 Case IH comes out with the 715 quadtrac and AF10 and AF11 [AF means axial flow]

=== Tenneco/International Harvester Merger ===
In 1984, Tenneco Case took control of International Harvester's agricultural division. They changed their brand name to Case International at first, and then abbreviated that to Case IH. International Harvester had been in economic turmoil since 1980, but was still one of the largest tractor manufacturers in the world. Merging the two lines brought together the best of both traditions, offering a full line of agricultural equipment, and probably saved both companies from becoming a victim of the 1980s farming recession.

In 1986, Case IH purchased Steiger Tractor and began producing their 4-wheel drive tractors under the Case IH name.

In 1987, Case IH released the Case IH Magnum series, creating the first tractor to be built by Case and International Harvester together.

In 1989, Case IH released the first Maxxum series tractor.

In 1995, Case IH becomes the first agricultural manufacturer to release Advanced Farming Systems with global positioning system technology.

In 1996, Case IH released the first Steiger Quadtrack.

In 1997, Case IH took over Fortschritt. Fortschritt was an East German brand of tractors, combine harvesters and other agricultural machines made by VEB Fortschritt (part of the IFA) in Neustadt, Saxony.

=== CNH Global Merger ===
In 1999, Case IH merged with New Holland Ag to form a new parent company, CNH Global.

In 2005, a STX500 Steiger Quadtrac tractor broke the World Plowing Record, turning 792 acres (3.21 km^{2}) of farmland in just 24 hours.

In 2006, the Case IH logo was displayed on a pair of Ferraris as part of the Ferrari Panamerican 20,000—a journey that took new Ferraris through 16 countries and across 20,000 miles (32,000 km) during a 15-stage, 84-day tour. The International Harvester "IH" logo in Case IH represents the head-on view of a farmer driving a tractor. The "I" symbolizes the driver of a tractor and is known as the red driver "I".

2007 was the Steiger tractor's 50th anniversary.

At present, CNH Global continues to manufacture the tractors branded Case IH. All Case IH equipment can use (B5) biodiesel from approved suppliers and nearly half of the models sold globally are approved, following proper protocols, for 100 percent biodiesel (B100).

== Factory locations ==
=== International ===
- Ferreyra, Argentina - Combine harvesters, Puma tractors
- Curitiba, Brazil - Farmall, Maxxum and Magnum Tractors
- Jesi, Italy - Tractors
- Piracicaba, Brazil - Sugarcane harvesters, Sprayers, Coffee harvesters and Planters
- Saskatoon, Saskatchewan - Crop Production Equipment
- Sorocaba, Brazil - 7230, 8230 and 9230 Combines
- St. Valentin, Austria - Tractors
- Basildon, England - Tractors
- TürkTraktör, Türkiye - Tractors
- CNH Industrial (India) Pvt limited - Tractors and harvesting equipment
- Querétaro, México - Tractors
- HEPCO, Iran - Sugarcane harvesters

=== United States ===
- Burlington, Iowa
- Burr Ridge, Illinois - Technical Center
- Goodfield, Illinois - Tillage Equipment
- Benson, Minnesota - Cotton Harvesters, Application Equipment
- Grand Island, Nebraska - Combines, Windrowers
- Fargo, North Dakota - Steiger and Quadtrac Tractors
- New Holland, Pennsylvania - Round Balers, Square balers, Pull-type Forage Harvesters, Disc Mower Conditioners and Box Spreaders
- Racine, Wisconsin - Magnum Tractors
- St. Nazianz, Wisconsin - Sprayers

== Current models ==
Case IH XL-series (1985 - 1996)

Case IH CS-series (1996 - 2008)

Case IH Vestrum series (2019 - …)

Case IH Maxxum series (1989 - …)

Case IH MX-series (1997 - 2006)

Case IH CVX-series (2000 - 2010)

Case IH Puma series (2007 - …)

Case IH Magnum series (1987 - …)

Case IH Optum series (2015 - …)

Case IH Steiger series (1958 - …) (STX 2000 - 2006)

== Gallery ==
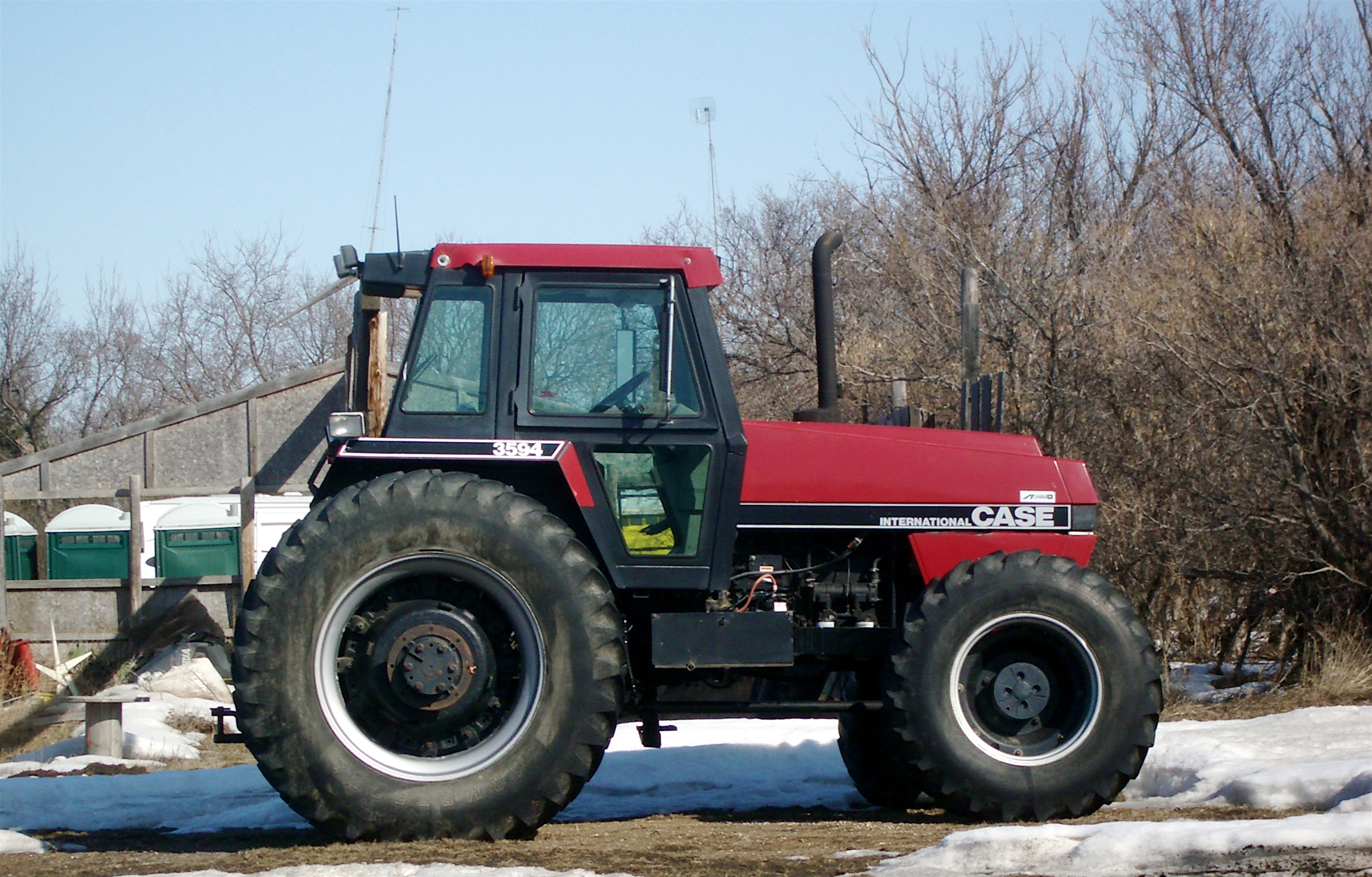
Case IH 3594 tractor

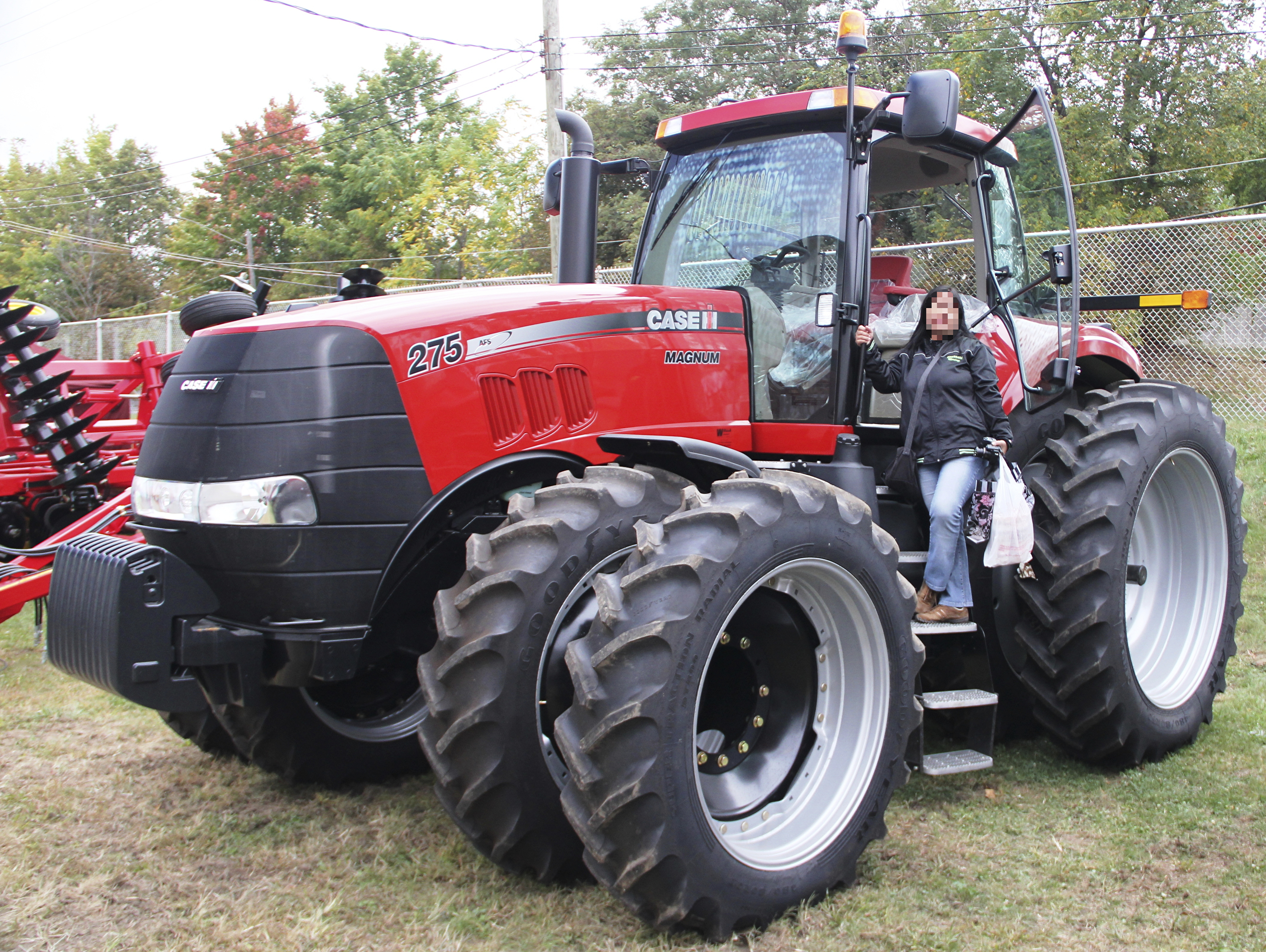
Case IH Magnum 275 AFS tractor

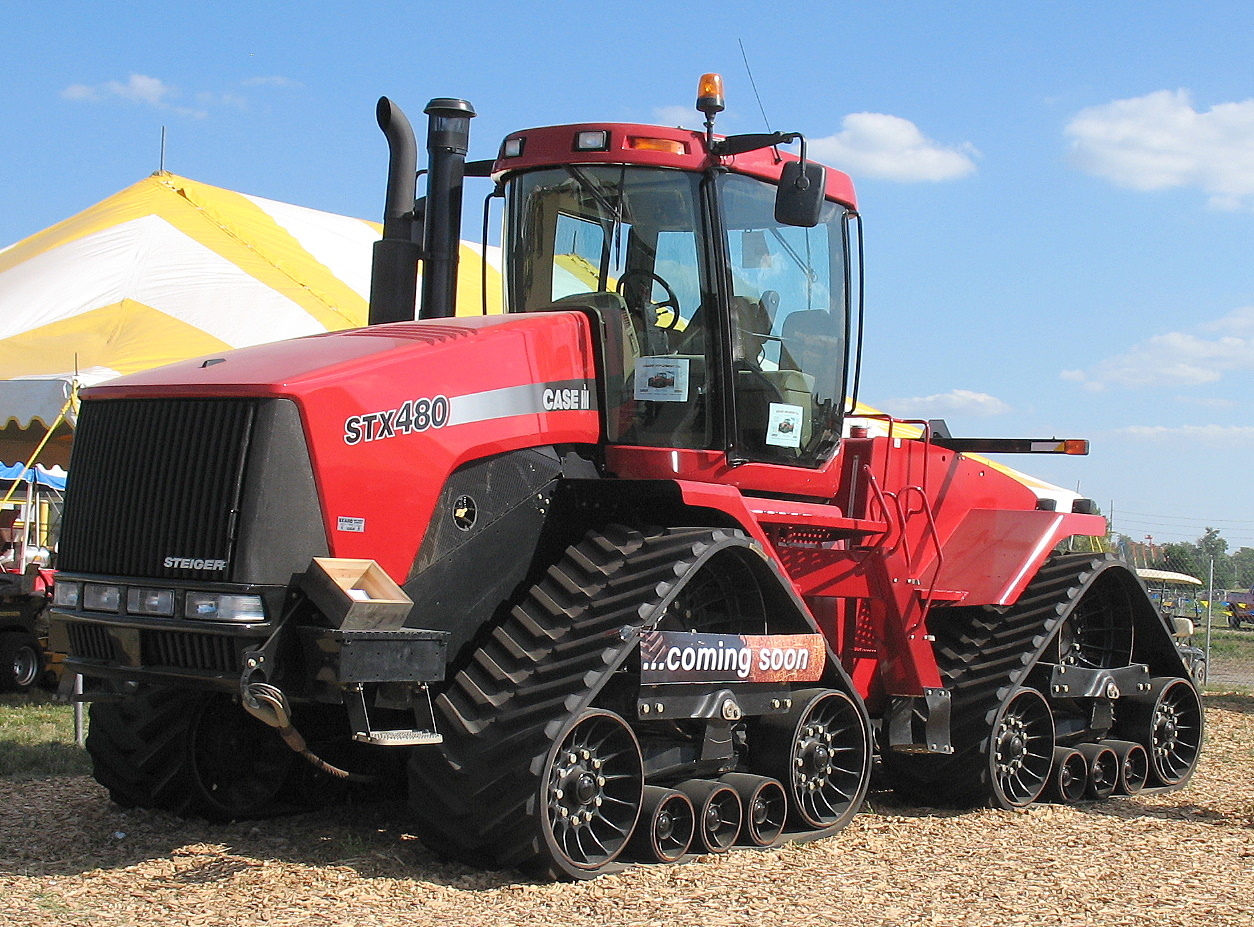
Case IH Steiger STX 480 tractor

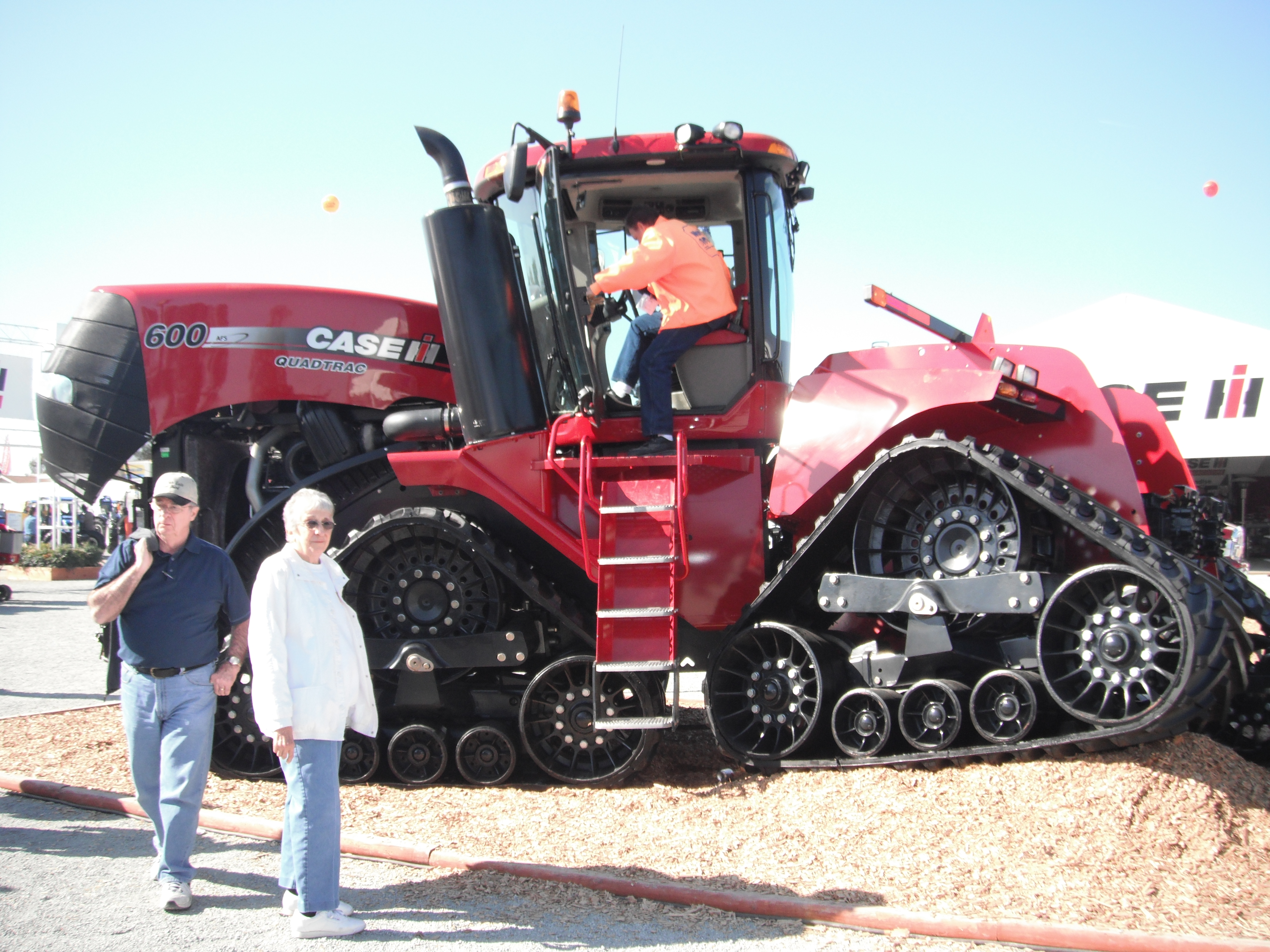
Case IH AFS 600 QuadTrac

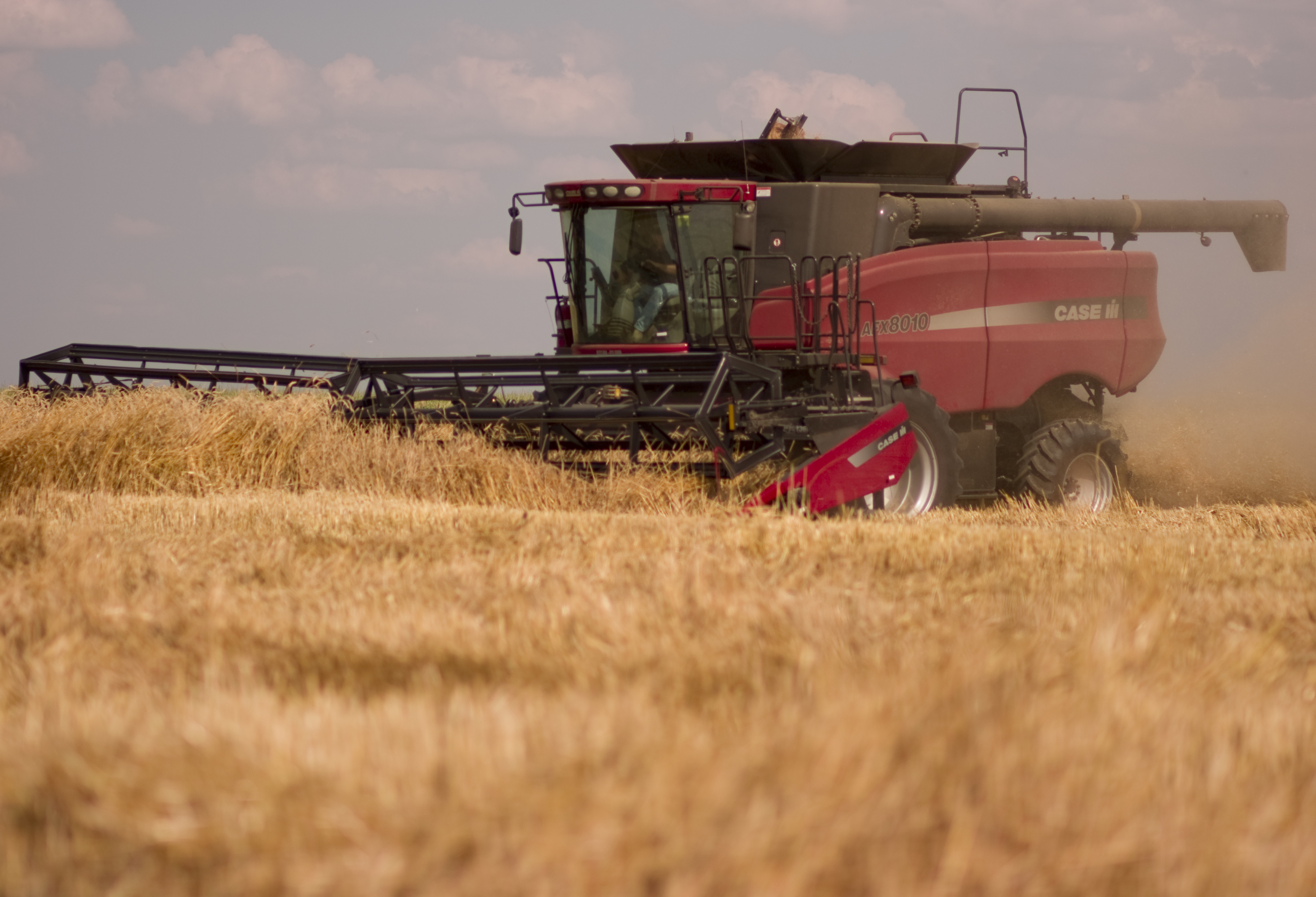
Case IH AFX 8010 combine

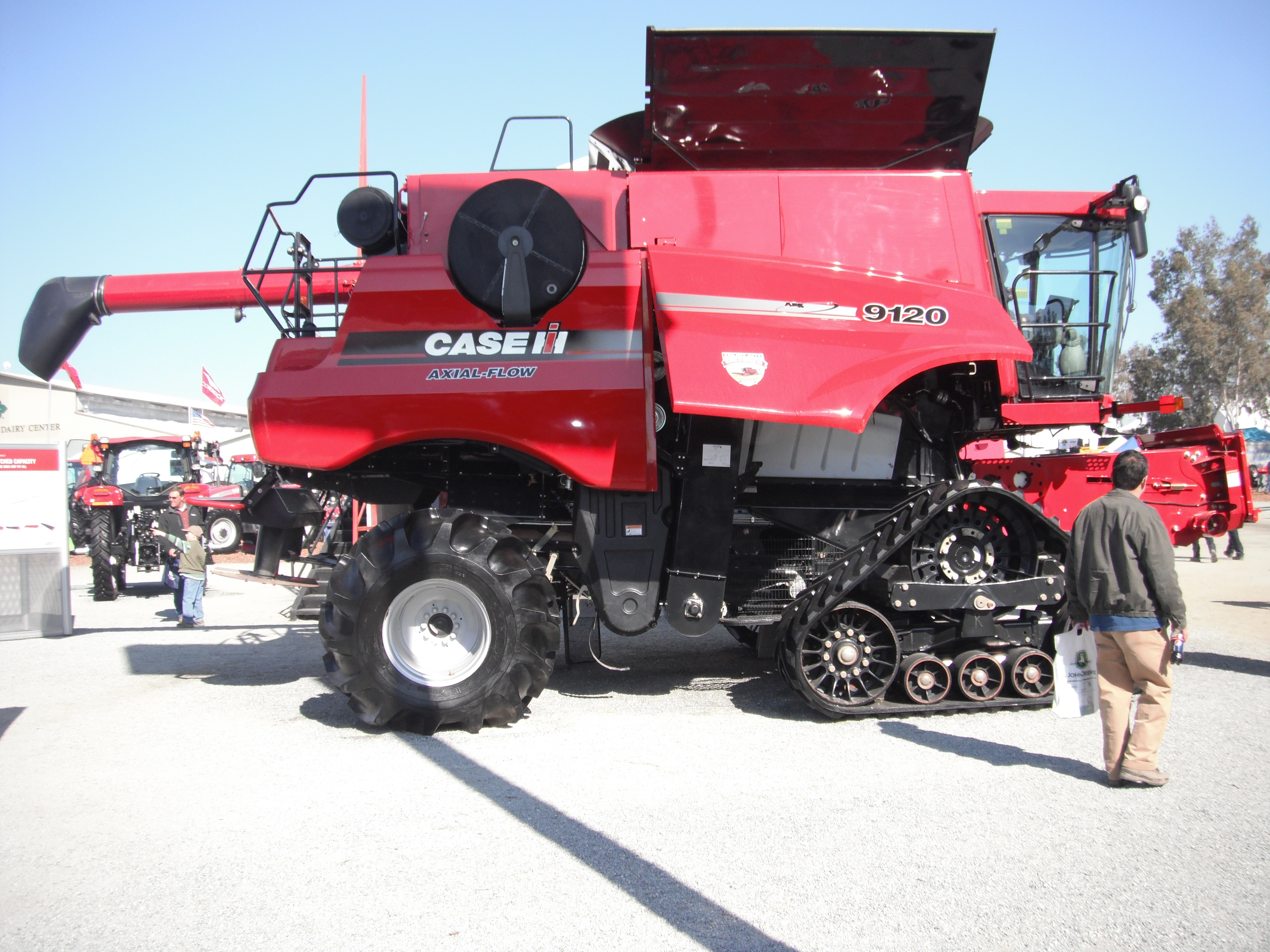
Case IH Axial-Flow AFX 9120 combine

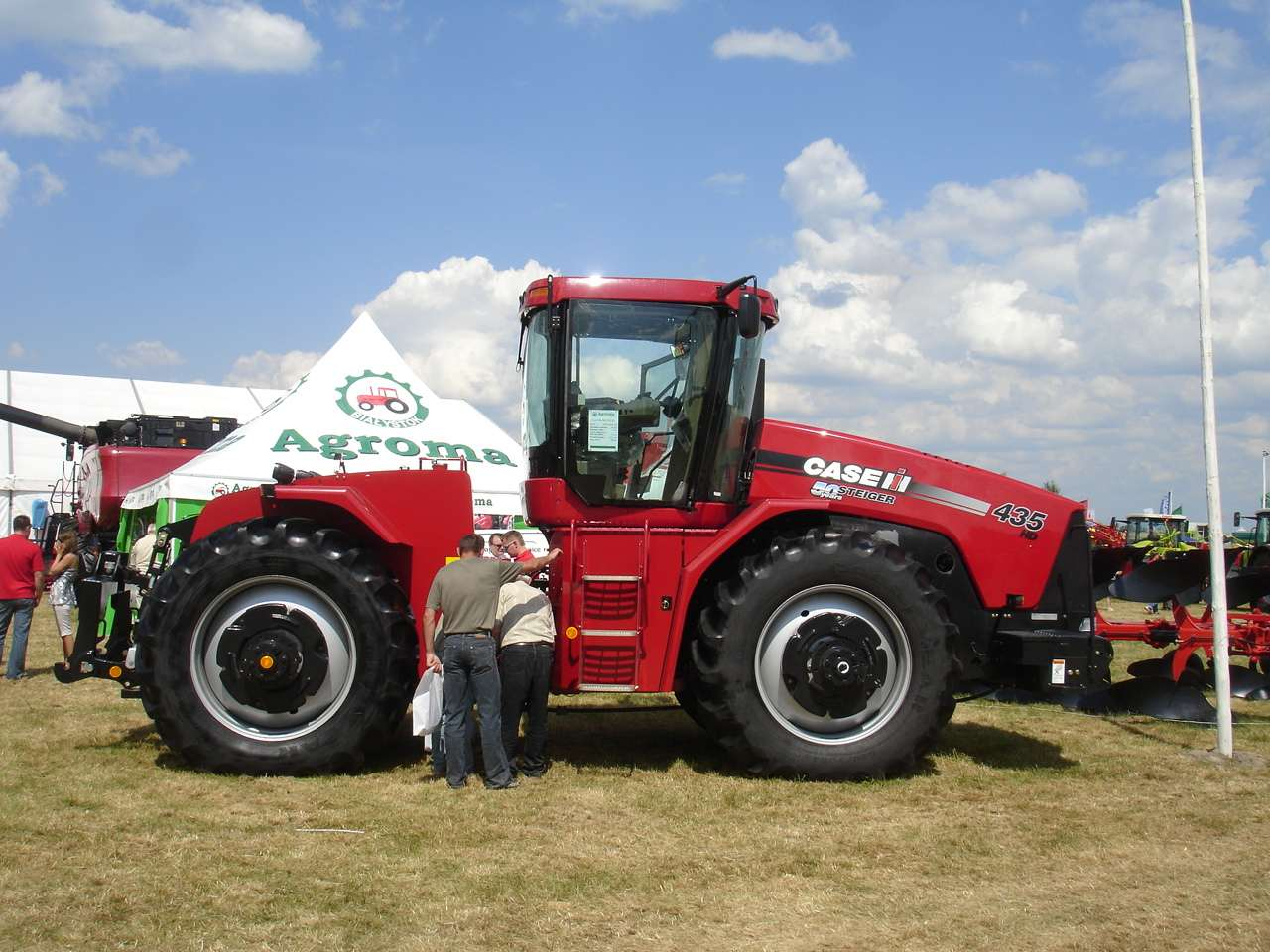
