= De Steiger =

Bernese patrician family

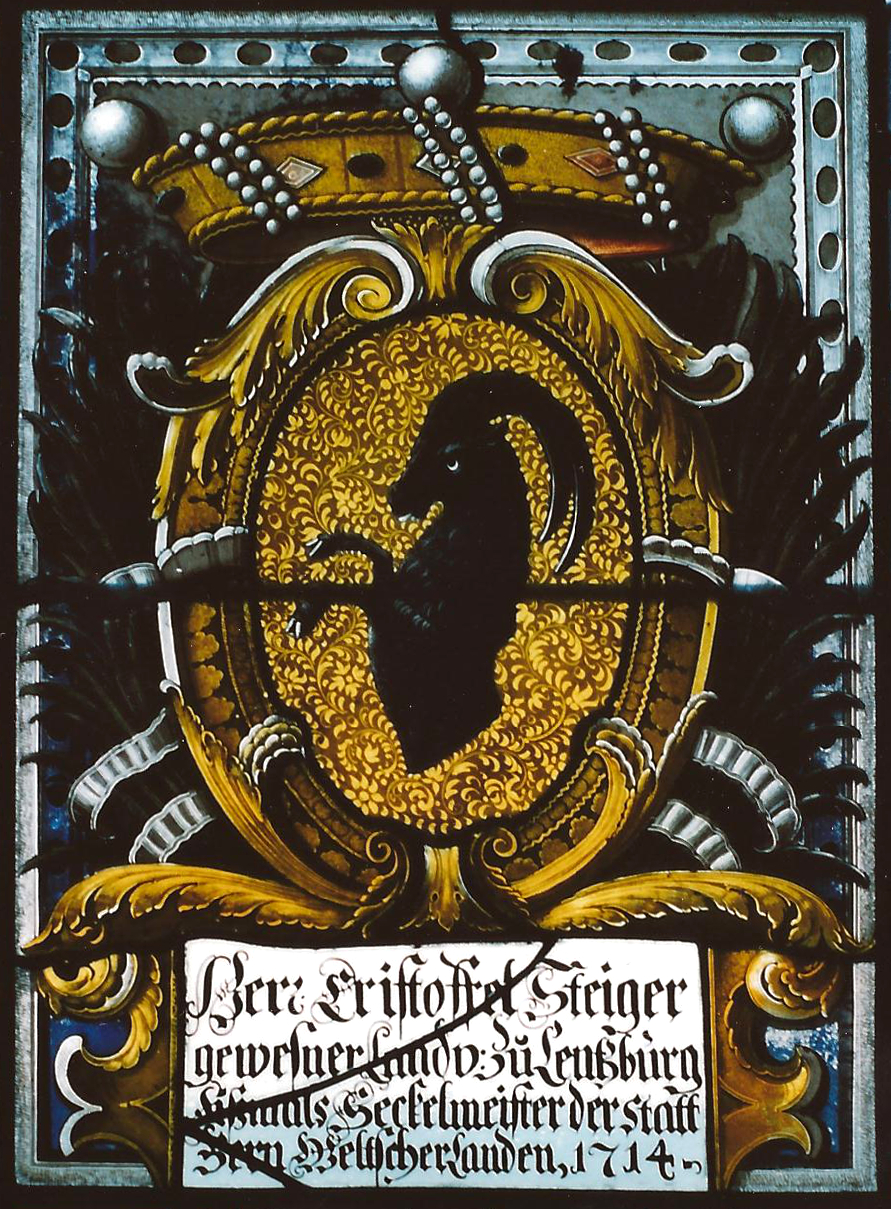
Coat of arms of the "black" Steiger family

The de Steiger family (or de Steiguer, von Steiger, von Steiguer) was a Bernese patrician family of the Swiss ancien régime.

== Origins ==
The origin of the family dates back to Johannes Steiger (1523–1577), a tailor in Bern, Switzerland. They would become known as the "black" Steigers, not to be confused with the "white" Steigers, because their coat of arms depicted a black ibex. Because of French influence in the Bernese patriciate, the name is also spelled de Steiguer. The predicate "von" is used in the German presentation of the family name.

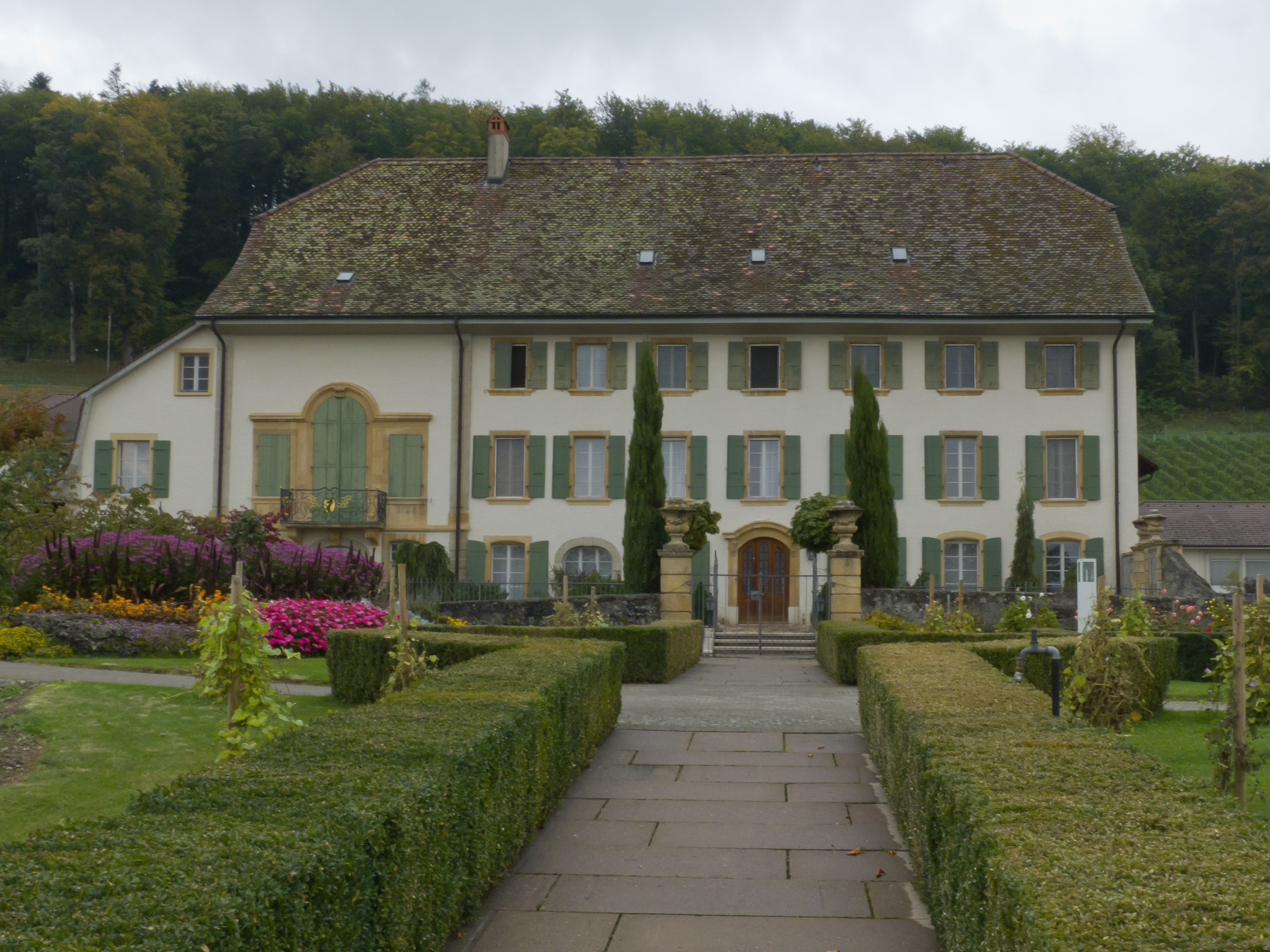
The von Steiger manor in Tschugg.

== Government service ==
Johannes's sons would serve on the Bernese councils, paving the way for future generations to serve in the government. By 1796, they held 22 seats on various councils throughout Bern. Over time they contributed three avoyers, five treasurers, and three bannerets to Bern, and numerous bailiffs, counselors, and officers.

A notable "black" de Steiger was Niklaus Friedrich von Steiger, the Schultheiss of Bern, and leader of the Bernese senate during French invasion in 1798. Another was Sigmund Emanuel von Steiger (1666–1725), member of the Great Council of Bern, and married to Countess Dorothea von Graffenried.

== Prussian nobility ==
In 1714, King Frederick William I of Prussia gave the hereditary title of Baron and a coat of arms to the "black" de Steigers, including Christoph, eight de Steiger males, and their descendants. They would have baronies in Montricher and Monnaz, in Vaud, and numerous estates in Bern. Their coat of arms still appears today on the walls of the Château de Chillon. Niklaus is buried in a cathedral in Bern.

== Principal residences and estates ==
- Manor of Tschugg (canton of Bern), built 1766–1771 by Schultheiss Niklaus Friedrich von Steiger in late-Louis XVI style; still owned by the family.
- Château de Montricher (Vaud), baronial seat after 1714.
- Château de Monnaz (Vaud), acquired 1720.
- Houses in the Junkerngasse (nos. 15, 21, 37, 51) and Herrengasse in Bern’s old town.
- Seigneuries of Belp, Bolligen, Ostermundigen, and partial rights in Kehrsatz and Rubigen.

== Notable members ==
- Niklaus Friedrich von Steiger (1729–1799), Swiss politician
- Johann Rudolf de Steiger (1778–1834), Swiss-American colonist
- Edmund von Steiger (1836–1908), Swiss clergyman and politician
- Eduard von Steiger (1881–1962), Swiss politician
- Louis R. de Steiguer (1867–1947), American Naval officer
