= Johann Rudolf de Steiger =

- Born: 1778
- Died: 1834 (aged 55–56)
- Spouses: Wilhelmina Muller; Magdalena Stalder
- Children: 3
- Relatives: Niklaus Friedrich von Steiger (cousin); Louis R. de Steiguer (great-grandson)

Baron Johann Rudolf de Steiger (or de Steiguer) (1778–1834) was a Swiss nobleman who immigrated to the United States in the 19th century.

== Early life ==
Johann was born into a Bernese noble family of the Ancien Régime of Switzerland. He was the son of Baron Johann Rudolf de Steiger and Elizabeth von Tavel, and born in Karlruhe, Germany in 1778. His father was a Lt. Colonel, and bailiff of Grandson, Switzerland, who resided for some time at Grandson Castle. Johann himself was a captain of the guards for Charles Frederick, Grand Duke of Baden, as well as a business owner.

=== French invasion ===
In 1798, French invaded Switzerland. The Swiss aristocracy was indecisive in dealing with this threat, but Johann's cousin, Niklaus Friedrich von Steiger was not. He was the most prominent political figure in Switzerland at the time, and leader of the political party and Bernese senate which supported the resistance against the French. Niklaus participated in the battle of Grauholz in 1798 in an attempt to push back the French invasion.

The Swiss aristocracy was overthrown by the French, however, and much of the de Steiger fortune usurped to pay for the French campaign in Egypt and Syria. In 1803, the Austrians and Russians invaded Switzerland, which led to the Act of Mediation.

=== Marriages ===
Johann married a German woman named Wilhelmina Muller, and they had three children, John, Elizabeth, and Wilhelmina. The couple later divorced. Johann, who owned a flour mill and fell in love with an employee's daughter, Magdalena Stalder. However, Bernese law prevented the intermarriage of Swiss nobility and lower classes. He left Bern, Switzerland to immigrate to the United States with dreams of creating a Swiss colony, and to marry Magdalena.

== Immigration to America ==
In 1819, Johann sold his family's possessions, including his business, gathered his children, Magdalena, and some Swiss colonists, and began a journey to America. They traveled to Amsterdam, where he married Magdalena, to board a ship for America. They arrived in America, journeyed to Philadelphia, then to Pittsburgh, and boarded a boat down the Ohio river.

They disembarked in southern Ohio, where Johann then purchased 3,680 acres (14.9 km^{2}) along the Federal creek in Athens, Ohio, for his family and fellow colonists. Ohio by this time was already a state of the United States, and the dreams of a Swiss colony were not realistic. The colonists were an urban group, and had troubles in the American frontier, but nonetheless survived. Johann built a cabin initially for his family, and eventually a Swiss-style cottage, which still stands as an historical landmark in Athens.

He died in 1834 and is buried in Boaz, Wood County, West Virginia. A descendant of Johann's was Louis R. de Steiguer, who was the grandson of John.

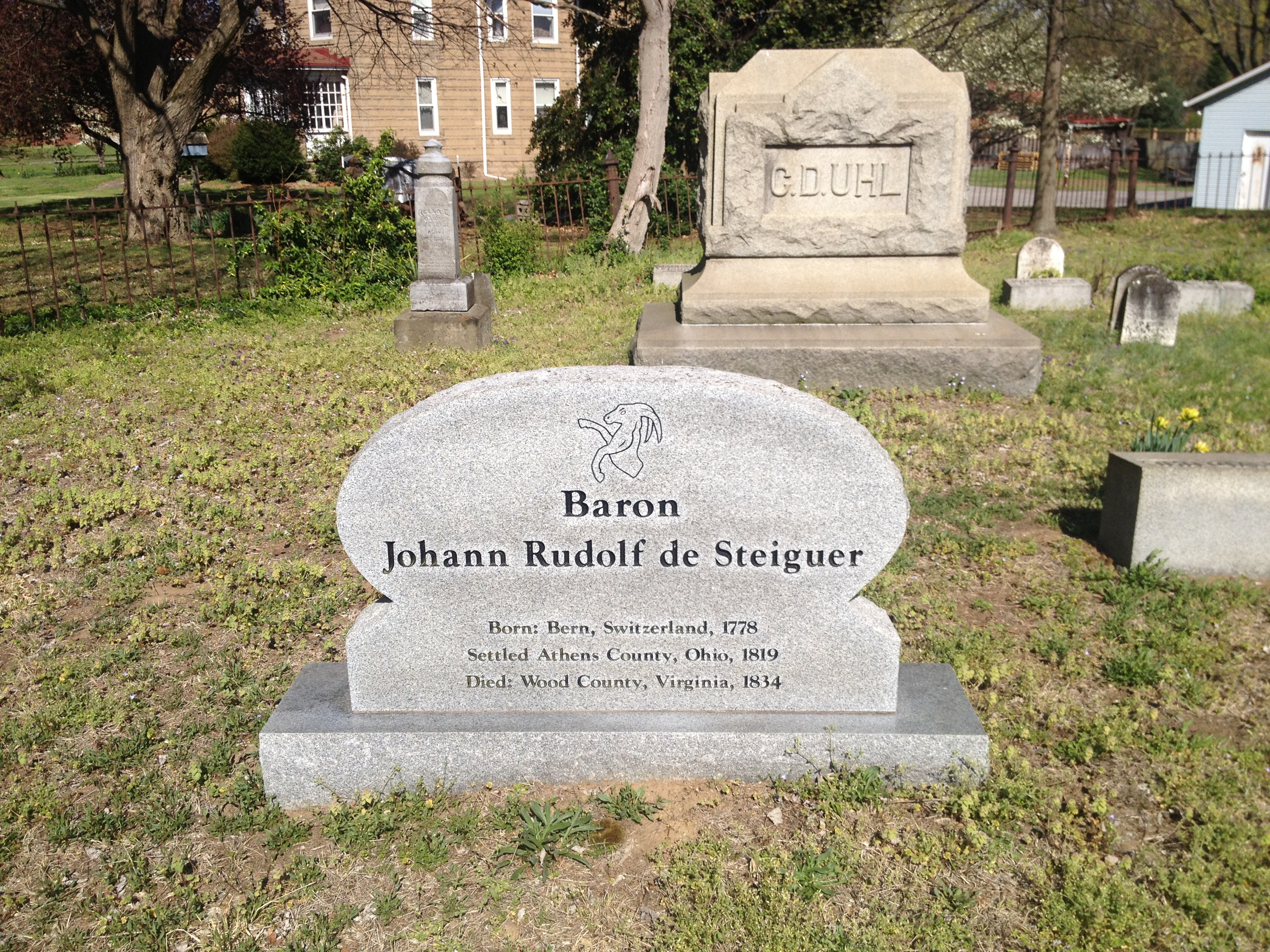
Baron Johann Rudolf de Steiguer grave.
