= The Millionaire (calculator) =

Mechanical calculator capable of multiplying

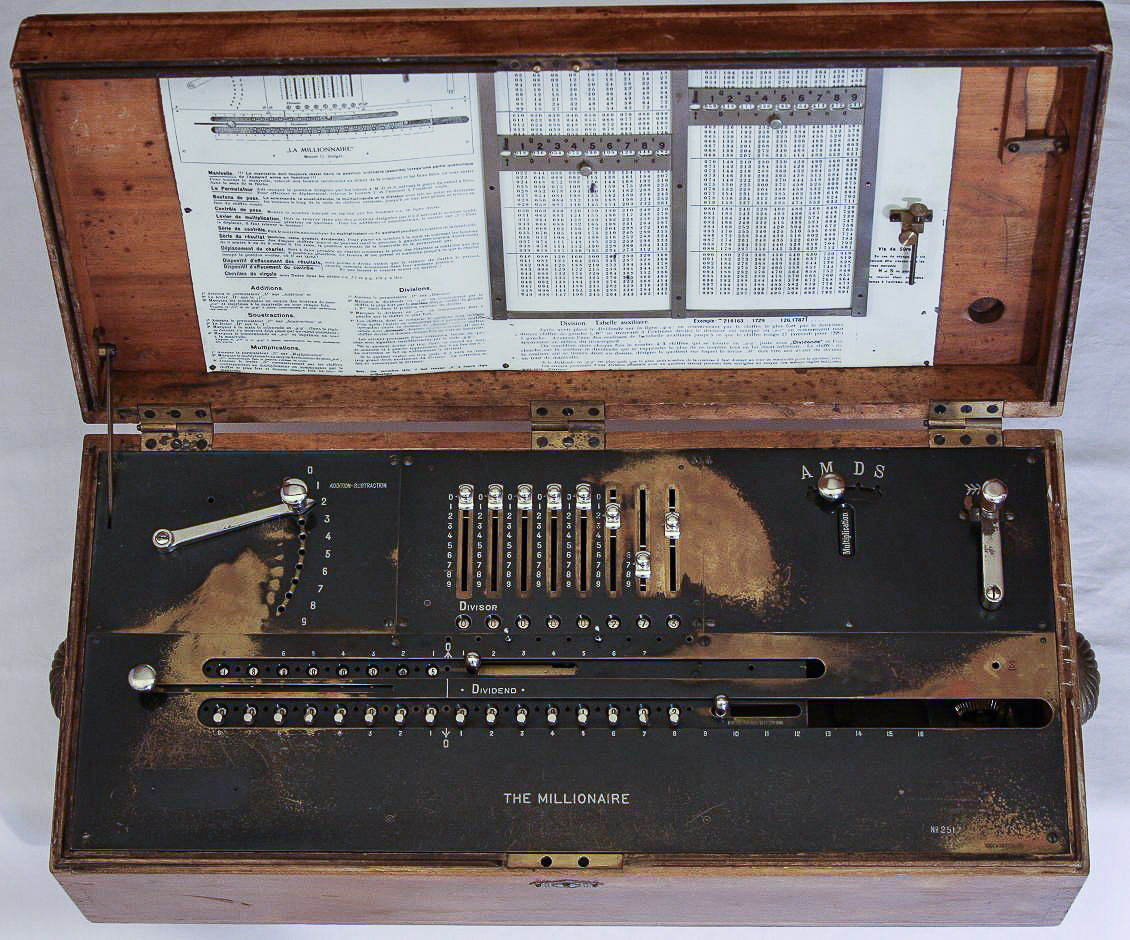
The Millionaire Calculator built by Egli around 1910

The Millionaire was the first commercially successful mechanical calculator that could perform a direct multiplication. It was in production from 1893 to 1935 with a total of about five thousand machines manufactured.

It was commercialized as "The Millionaire" in English speaking countries, "La Millionnaire" in French and "Millionär" in German speaking countries.

== History ==
The principle of a calculation machine with progressive transmission of tens was invented by Chebyshev and demonstrated at the 1878 World's fair in Paris. In 1881 Chebyshev demonstrated a model of the calculation machine with automatic multiplication but did not take out a patent for it.

In 1834 Luigi Torchi of Milan invented a direct multiplication machine. The first patented multiplying machines was due to Edmund Barbour (1872), Ramón Verea (1878) and Léon Bollée (1889). The Bollée machine could be considered the direct ancestor of the Millionaire.

Designed by Otto Steiger, a Swiss engineer, the moving carriage of the Millionaire has a 20 decimal digit accumulator that shows the product after multiplication and into which dividend is entered prior to division. The 10-digit multiplicand or divisor is entered on the sliders (or keyboard, on later models) above the carriage, while successive digits of the multiplier or quotient are entered with a push-button lever on the upper left. A large control knob on the upper right can be set to add, multiply, divide or subtract positions.

The Millionaire was first patented in Germany in 1892. Patents were issued in France, Switzerland, Canada and the United States in 1893, and production started in 1893. From 1899 to 1935 Hans W. Egli of Zürich handled the machine. The American agent for the Millionaire was W. A. Morschhauser of New York. A detailed investigation by Gerald Saudan established that 5,099 "Millionaire" had been manufactured overall in four decades, rather than the commonly quoted 4,655 units.

The Millionaire was advertised as being the "only calculating machine on the market ... that requires but one turn of the crank ... for each figure in the multiplier or quotient," making it the fastest calculator available. Advertising from 1913 claims that the United States government had purchased over 100 Millionaire calculators.

== Competition ==
All mechanical calculators commercialized prior to the Millionaire, like the arithmometer, the Odhner arithmometer or the comptometer were simple adding machines; they implemented multiplication by continued addition under operator control. In 1889, Léon Bollée, in France, invented a machine that required only one turn of the crank handle to multiply the number entered on the sliders by a multiplier number. This was accomplished by creating a mechanical representation of the multiplication table which could be read and used by the machine. The manufacturing cost of Bollée's machine was too high and the production was discontinued after a few units. The Millionaire was built with the same target of direct mechanical multiplication in mind.

In first decades of 20th century two other machines with direct multiplication were produced: the Moon-Hopkins and Kuhrt-US. These two companies were then taken over by Burroughs and Brunsviga. These machines filled quite a different niche from the Millionaire. They were book-keeping machines with printing features, and were too unwieldy to perform divisions and complex computations. The Millionaire was better suited for technical computations.

This machine weighed some 20 kilograms and was the size of a small suitcase, occupying half of a desk. It was as easy to operate as the Arithmometer, which had established a standard since the mid-XIXth century.

Desktop Mechanical Calculators in production during the 19th century
