= Otto Steiger (engineer) =

Swiss engineer (1858–1923), designer of the Millionaire calculator

Otto Steiger (1858–1923) was a Swiss engineer. Steiger came from St. Gallen and lived in Munich.

Steiger is known for the invention and construction of the Millionaire mechanical calculator, the first commercially successful direct multiplication calculator (German patent 1892).
