= Jakob Robert Steiger =

Swiss politician

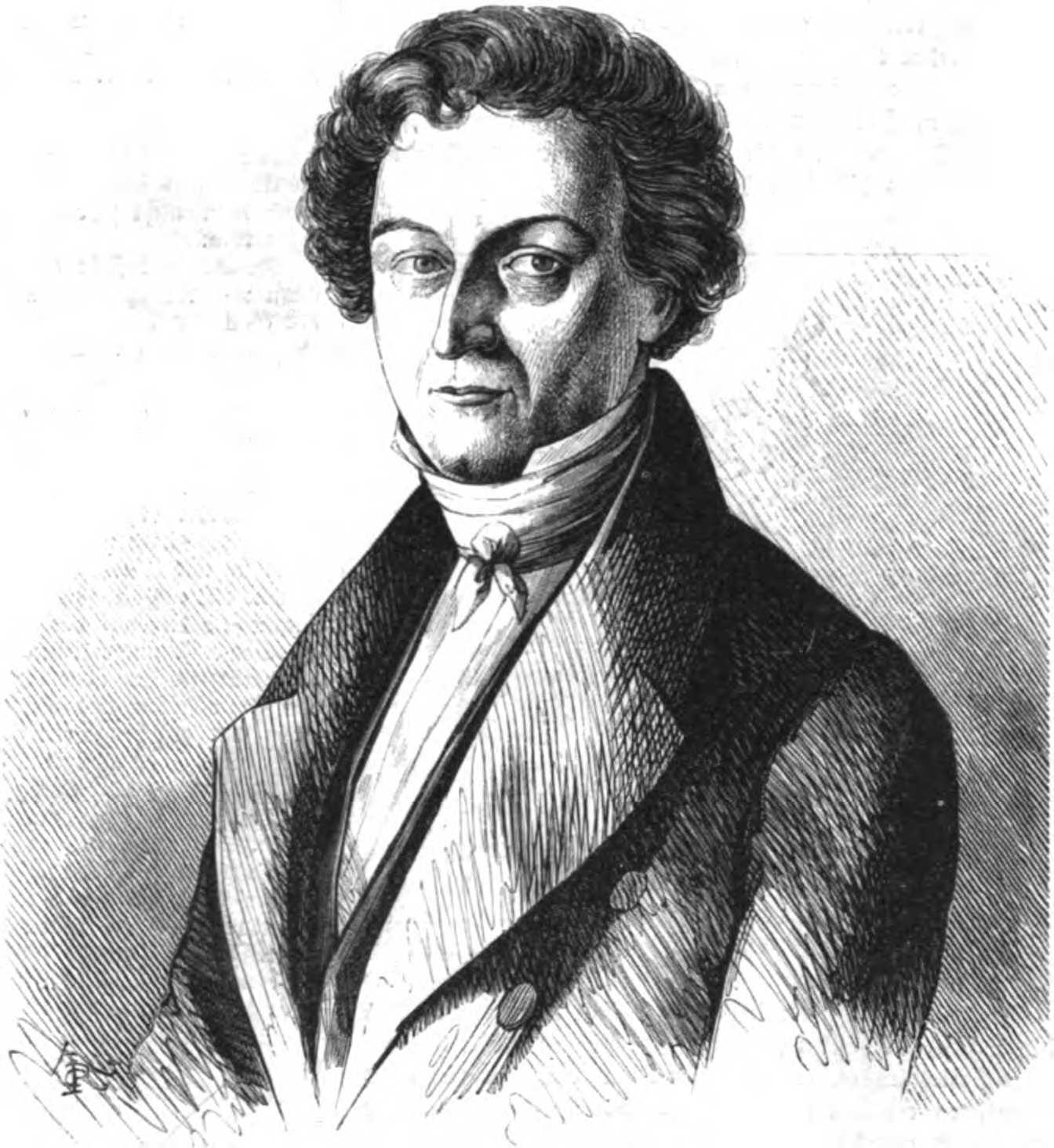
Jakob Robert Steiger

Jakob Robert Steiger (7 June 1801, in Geuensee – 5 April 1862) was a Swiss politician and President of the Swiss National Council (1848/1849).

== Early life and education ==
Steiger was born to peasants in Geuensee near Sursee. His father was from Büron. With the support of one of his teachers, he studied Latin in Sursee and later also attended high school in Lucerne. He began to study theology in 1823. Not satisfied with this choice, Steiger soon settled to Geneva, where he attended lectures of Jacques Denys Choisy, aiming for a career as a medic. Having studied medicine in Freiburg im Bresigau in Germany until 1826 he moved to Paris, where he then also graduated the same year.

Already in high school, he developed political interests, holding a speech remembering the victory at the Battle of Sempach or taking part in students protests against the expulsion of the Professor of Philosophy Iganz Paul Vital Troxler an influential figure in his life.

== Professional career ==
After having obtained the license to work as a medic also by the Canton of Lucerne. He established himself as a medic in Büron. Additionally he also wrote for the political journal Eidgenossen, which was published first in Sursee, later in Lucerne. In 1830 he was involved in organizing the liberal politics in the countryside of Lucerne which demanded a new constitution for the Canton Lucerne with less power to the aristorcary.

== Political career ==
In late 1830 he was elected into the Constitutional Assembly which crafted the Constitution of 1831. Later that year he was elected into the Grand council and then also the Executive council of Lucerne. He became the president of the Grand Council becoming in 1834. In 1837 he did not stand again for the executive council, alleging the political situation has developed to his satisfaction. In 1841 Steiger was not re-elected into the grand council and following rebelled against the reigning conservative government, specifically against the invitation of the Jesuits to Lucerne. In 1844 he was arrested for his rebellious activities but soon released on bail. In 1845 he was again arrested and sentenced to death. Over 3000 petitions for pardon were written and the sentence caused also some intervention by neighboring countries, the Kingdom of Sardinia offered themselves to negotiate a pardon and exile for Steiger. Eventually Steiger managed to escape and established himself in Winterthur, where he worked as a medic.

In 1848 he was elected into the National Council of Switzerland which he stayed until 1852, becoming its president in 1848. He was also in the Executive Council of Lucerne until 1852, when he resigned after having lost in his aim to support he construction of railway by the state. Instead, the National Council ordered the railways to be constructed with private funds. Josef Martin Knüsel was elected as Steigers successor.

== Works ==
- Steiger, Jakob Robert (1860). Die Flora des Kantons Luzern, der Rigi und des Pilatus, nebst einer Einleitung in die Pflanzenkunde überhaupt, und erläuternden Abbildungen. Bearbeitet für das Volk und seine Lehrer (in German). Luzern: Verlag von Frz. Jos. Schiffmann.
- Steiger, Jakob Robert (1836). Kurze Lebensbeschreibung des Schultheiss Eduard Pfyffer sel. Sursee: Schnyder.

Preceded by Ulrich Ochsenbein	President of the National Council; 1848-1849	Succeeded by Alfred Escher
