= Case STX Steiger =

STX Steiger
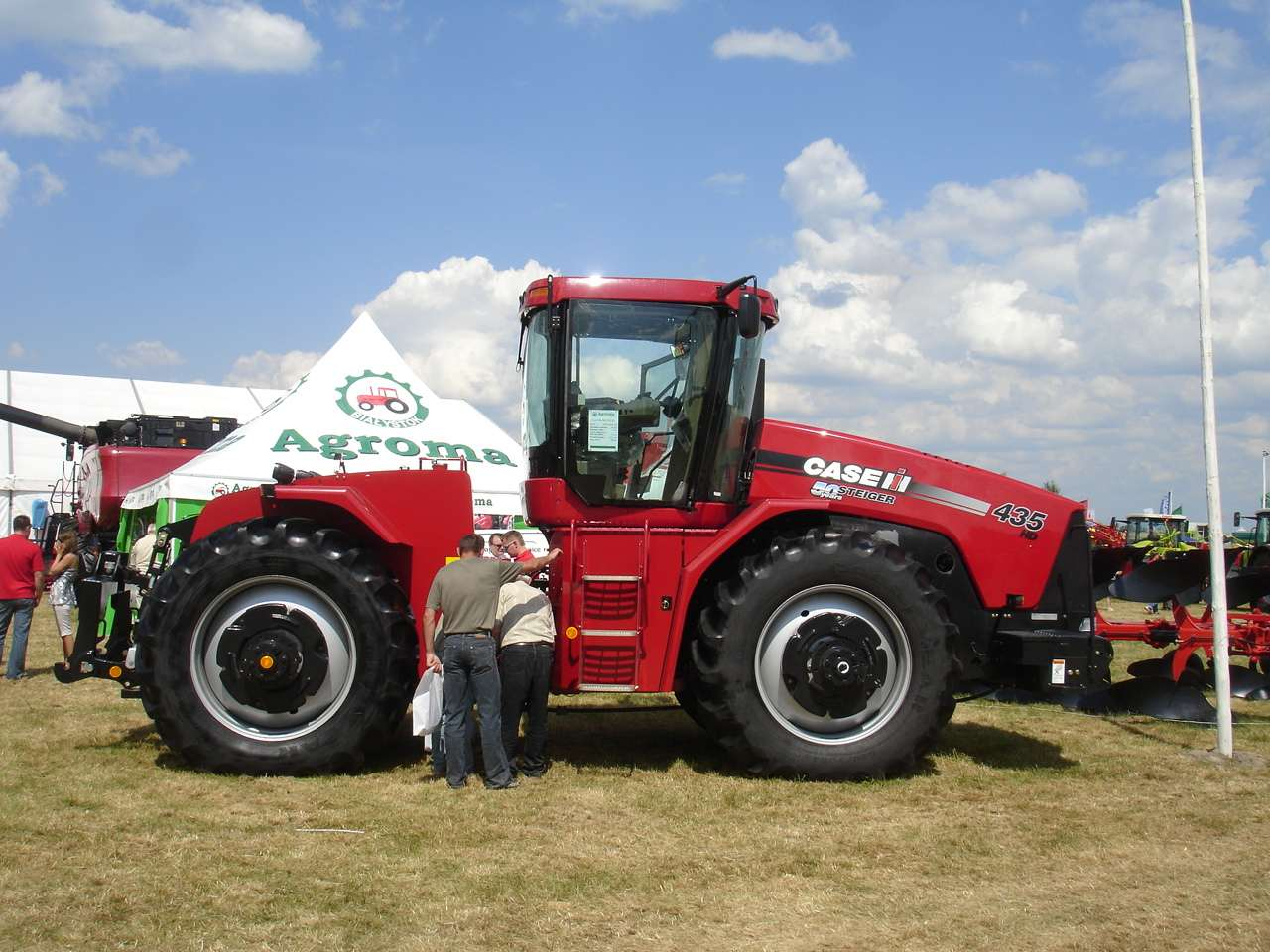
- Case IH Steiger 435 wheeled tractor

Overview
- Manufacturer: Case IH
- Production: 2000-2008
- Assembly: Fargo, North Dakota

Body and chassis
- Class: Heavy Tractor
- Layout: Articulated tractor

Powertrain
- Capacity: 8.7–12.9 litres (530–790 cu in)
- Transmission: 16 speed power shift
- Propulsion: Wheels or Quadtrac

Dimensions
- Wheelbase: 139–154 in (3,530.6–3,911.6 mm)
- Curb weight: 39,600–58,000 lb (17,962–26,308 kg)

The Case STX Steiger was a tractor line built by Case IH. This line continued the models built by Steiger Tractor, which was purchased by Case IH in 1986. The current model line is named Case IH Steiger.

The tractors were built in Case IH's plant in Fargo, North Dakota, from 2000-2008, where already 50,000 units of this line were built as of September 2005.

This tractor line is powered by engines with 405 to 682 hp. They are available in wheeled, Quadtrac, and row-crop Rowtrac configurations, and are very closely related to the New Holland T9 range.

In 2005, the STX500 Quadtrac tractor set a new Ploughing World Record. The machine ploughed 321ha in just 24 hours, led by Jean Imbert who drove the tractor.

In 2007, the STX530 Quadtrac tractor was featured on the television series Top Gear, where presenter Richard Hammond chose the STX Steiger for some of the challenges, (eventually including ploughing.) It was lapped around the Top Gear Test Track by The Stig, finishing in a time of 4:49.1, which is the slowest lap ever round the track. In 2005 that model of tractor broke the 24-hour ploughing World Record, turning 792 acres (321 ha) of farmland in just 24 hours.

== Performance ==
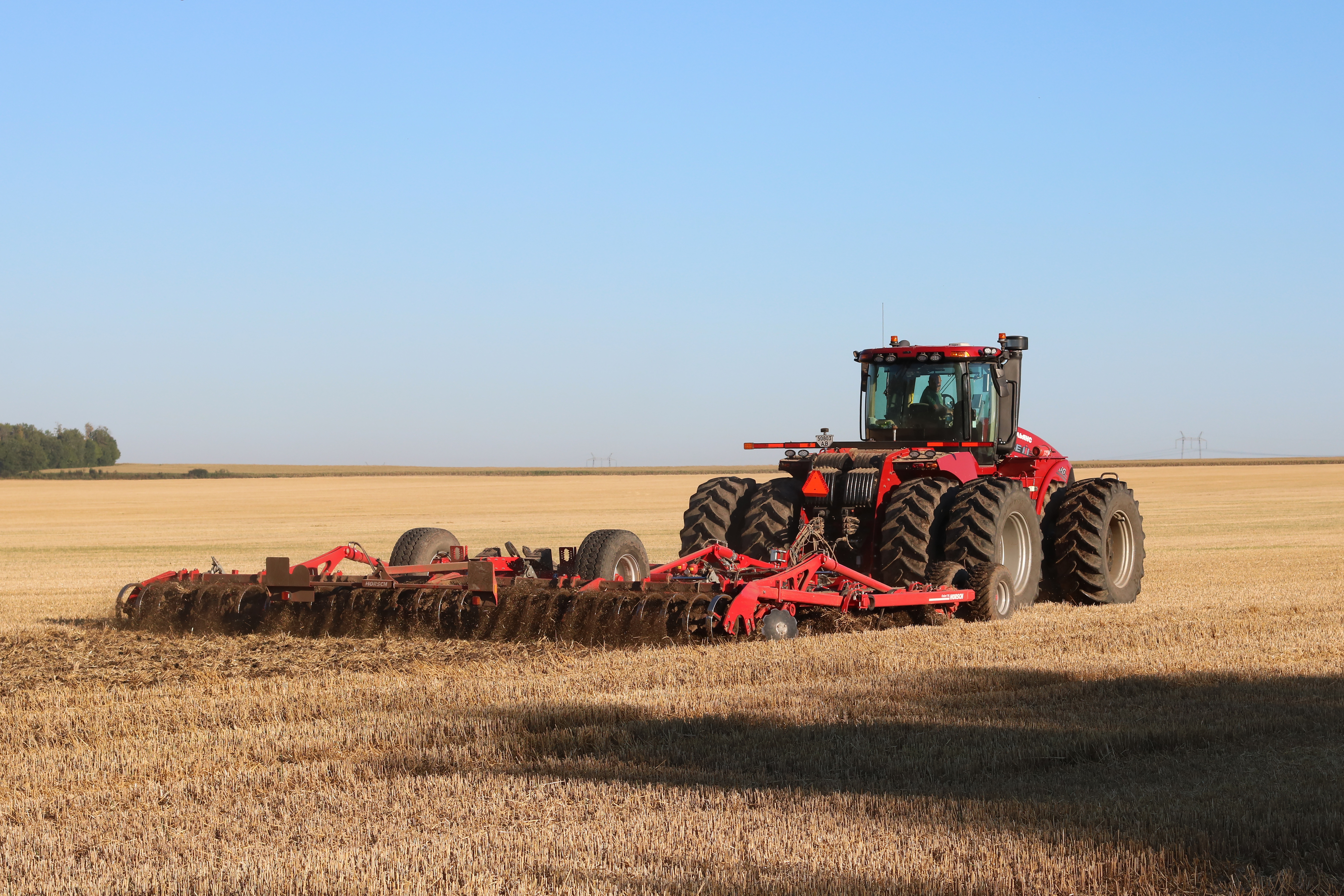
Case IH AFS Connect Steiger 600 tractor in a field

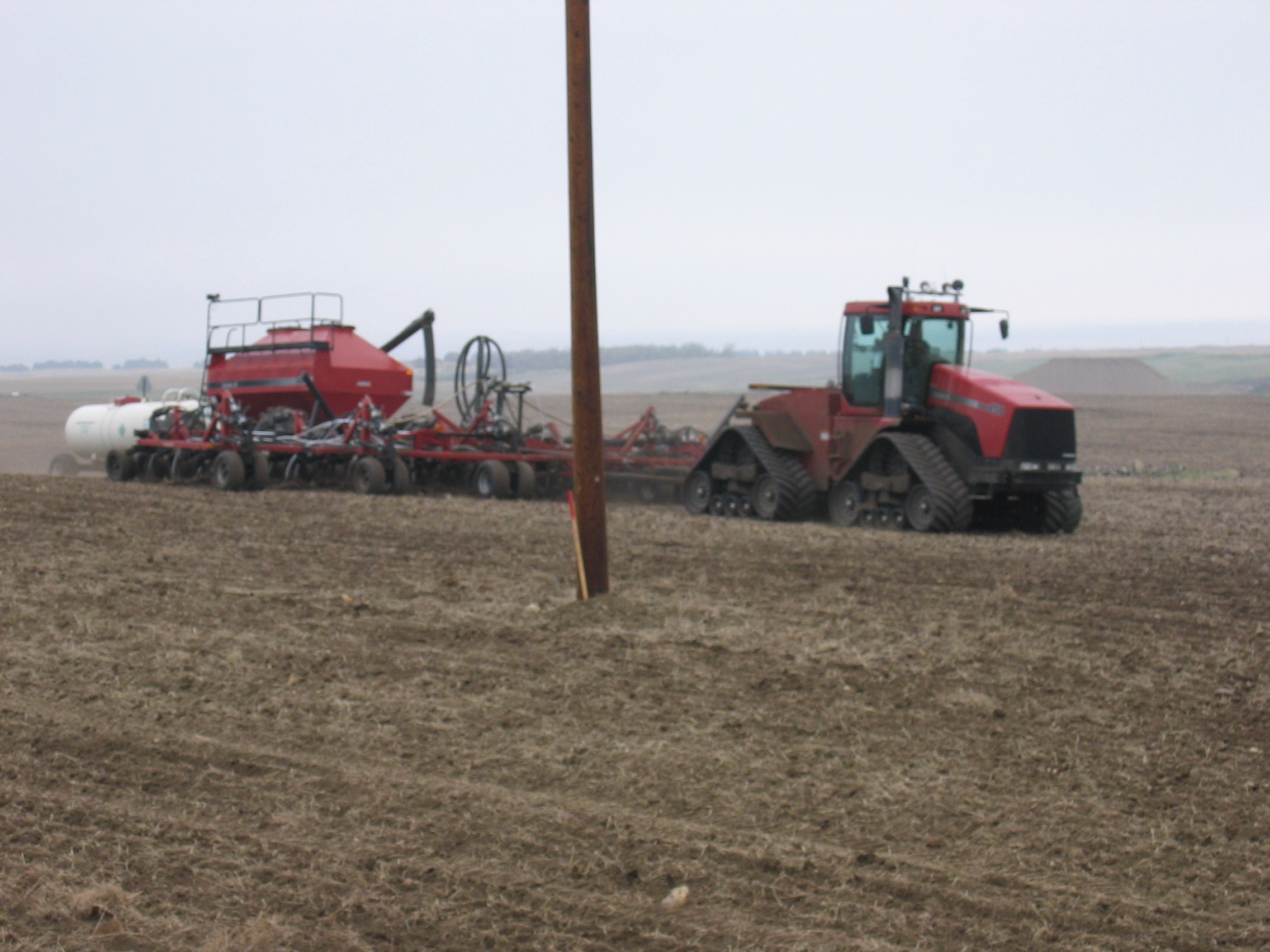
Case STX Quadtrac tractor pulling a large seed drill combination

- Displacement: 8.7-12.9 L
- Peak horsepower: 405–682 hp
- Torque rise: 35–40%
- Fuel tank: 200 gal. (758 L)–300 gal. (1,138 L)
- Operating Weight (wheeled): 39,600 lb. (17,960 kg)–54,000 lb. (24,494 kg)
- Operating Weight (Quadtrac): 58,000 lb. (26,308 kg)
- Wheelbase: 139 in. (353 cm)–154 in. (391 cm)
- 16 speed power shift transmission
- 2 reverse gears
- Top Speed: 30 km/h (18.7 mph)@2,100rpm
- Top Reverse Speed: 14.7 km/h (9.1 mph)@2,100rpm
- Produced: Fargo, North Dakota

== Models ==
(2nd generation)

- STX 280
- STX 330
- STX 380
- STX 380 Quadtrac
- STX 430
- STX 430 Quadtrac
- STX 480
- STX 480 Quadtrac
- STX 530
- STX 530 Quadtrac
