= Niklaus Friedrich von Steiger =

Swiss politician (1729-1799)

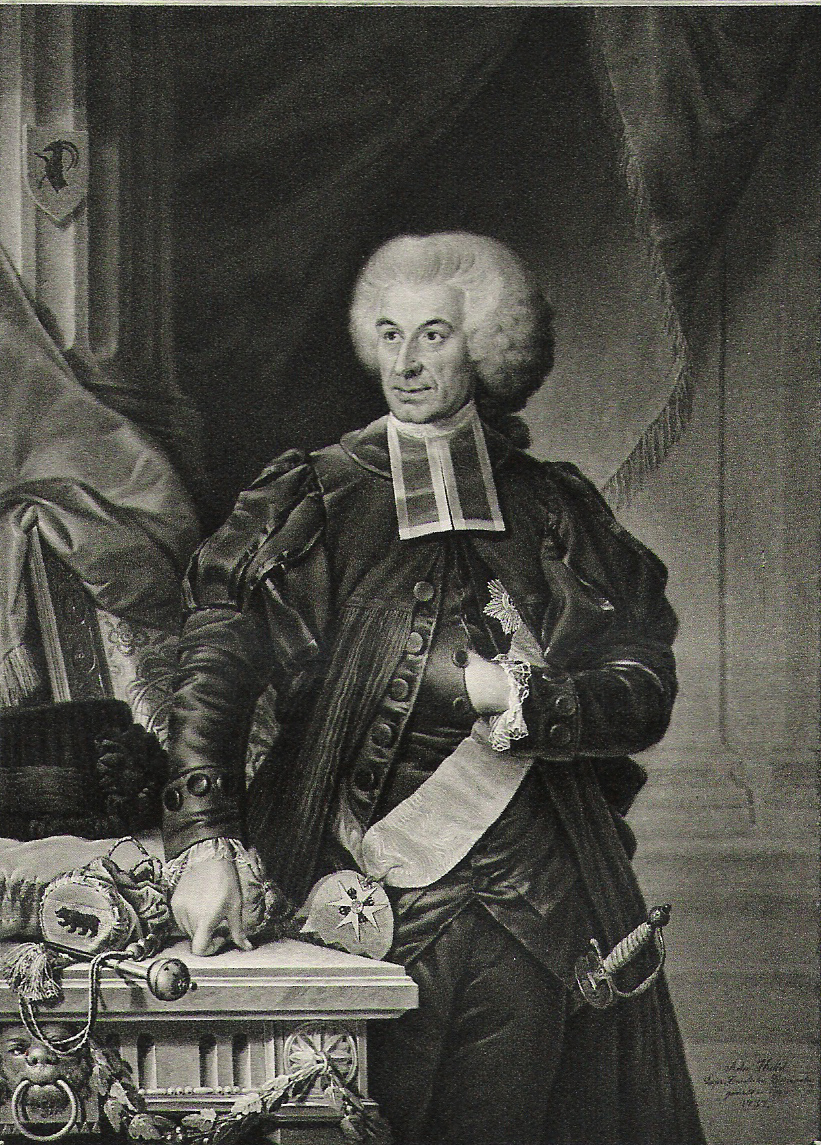
- Niklaus Friedrich von Steiger
- Born: 17 May 1729
- Died: 3 December 1799 (aged 70)
- Occupation: Swiss politician

Niklaus Friedrich von Steiger (17 May 1729 – 3 December 1799) was a Swiss politician.

From 1787 to 1798 he was elected Schultheiss (chief magistrate) of Bern, Switzerland. He was the leader of the political faction that resisted the French invasion of Switzerland in 1798 and participated in the Battle of Grauholz.

== See also ==
- Johann Rudolf de Steiger, Niklaus' cousin.
