= Björn Steiger Foundation =

- Founded: 7 July 1969
- Founder: Siegfried and Ute Steiger
- Type: Benevolent (Medical and Emergency Aid)
- Location: Winnenden, Baden-Württemberg, Germany
- Region served: Germany
- Method: Charitable donations to emergency medical services, funding of emergency vehicles, public finance.
- Owner: Siegfried and Ute Steiger
- Key people: Pierre-Enric Steiger (President)
- Website: www.steiger-stiftung.de

The Björn Steiger Foundation (Björn Steiger Stiftung) is a German charity which assists in providing funding for emergency services, and rescue organisations. It is named after an 8-year-old child, Björn Steiger, who died in 1969 after being hit by a car whilst returning home from a communal swimming pool. Despite several calls to emergency services it took nearly one hour until paramedics arrived. Björn Steiger died from shock on the way to the hospital. Shortly after this incident, his parents, Siegfried and Ute Steiger, set up the foundation in his memory.
