= Steiger Tractor =

Tractor brand that is manufactured in the United States

Steiger is a tractor brand that is manufactured in the United States.

== History ==
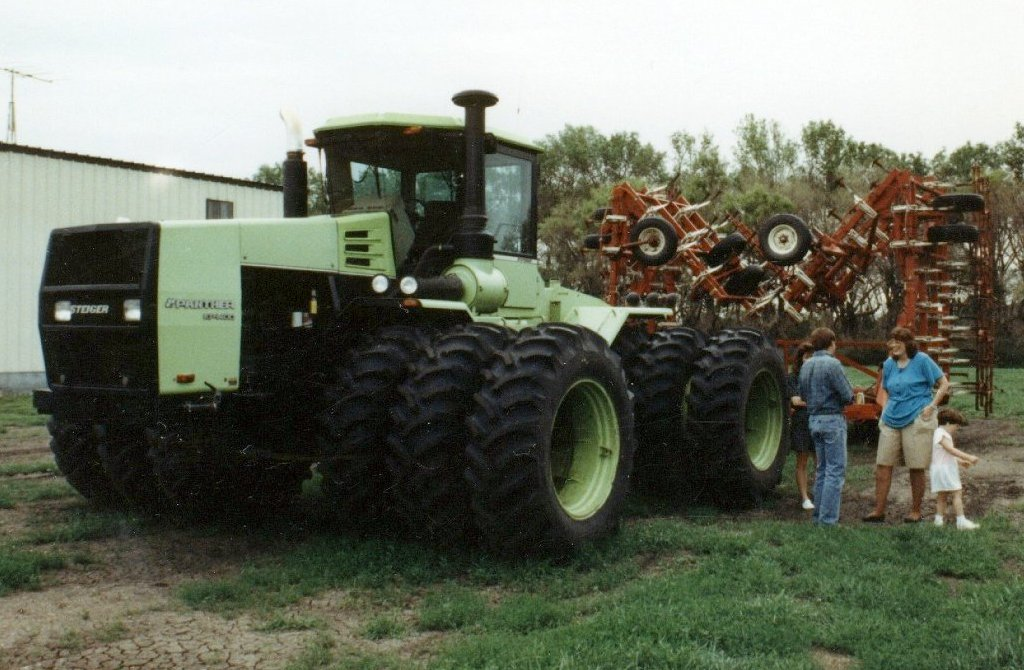
A Steiger Panther tractor with tripled wheels

The Steiger Tractor Company was founded in the 1950s by Douglass Steiger and Maurice Steiger, brothers who were farmers near Red Lake Falls, Minnesota. The Steigers first built a tractor in their workshop for their own use out of truck components, before beginning broader manufacturing and marketing of tractors in the United States and Canada.

In 1969, the tractor division of Steiger Farms was moved to Fargo, North Dakota.

In the 1970s, International Harvester company of Chicago purchased a 30% stake in the company. This stake was later sold to Deutz-Fahr of Germany in 1982.

Under CEO Eugene Dahl (formerly VP of Purchasing for the Melroe Company of Gwinner, ND) they have been one of the few successful mass-producers of 4WD tractors in the world.

It was acquired by Case IH in 1986, which later became part of Italy's FIAT Group.

Case IH, formed from the merger of Tenneco's Case with the agricultural arm of International Harvester, purchased Steiger in 1986, and the familiar lime-green color of Steiger's was retired as CIH's red took over. The Steiger name disappeared for a while, but was re-introduced on the 4WD tractors in Case IH's stable as their flagship line, they can also be purchased as a New Holland. The 2009 models are branded as Case STX Steiger and are offered in power rating from 200 hp to 500+ hp, with a Quadtrac option on most models in the lineup.

Steiger has built tractors for other tractor manufacturers and distributors under the International Harvester and Co-op Implements brand, such as, Ford and Allis-Chalmers.

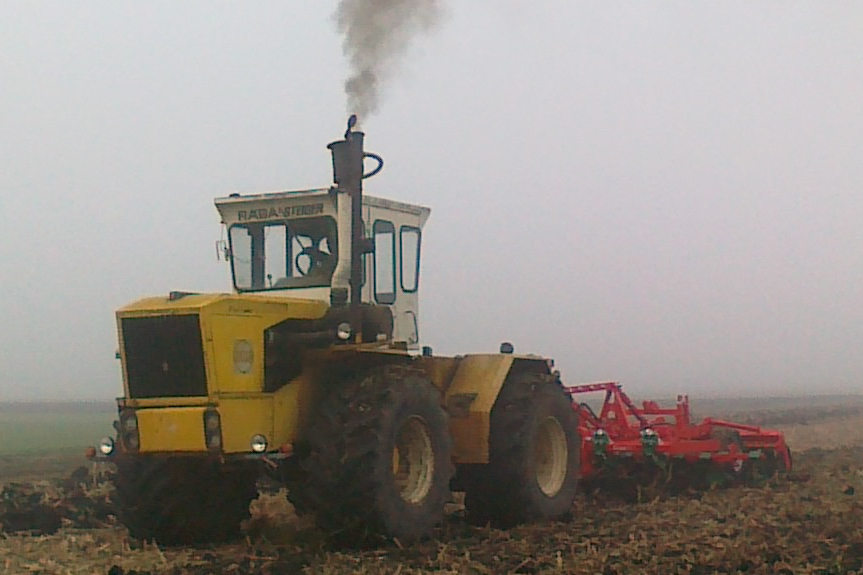
Rába Steiger 250

Steiger licensed their tractor designs to RÁBA of Hungary, which built RÁBA and RÁBA-Steiger tractors. Vandel, of France, also licensed the Steiger design and built tractors under their name.

Former Steiger President Jack Johnson later formed Titan Tractors in Fargo to re-manufacture and retrofit old Steigers but the company ultimately went bankrupt after building only 12 tractors due to the fact that their refurbished tractors were very close in price to the brand new Steigers of the day.

American Tractors, or AmTrac, in England, retrofits and rebuilds old Steigers.

== Models ==
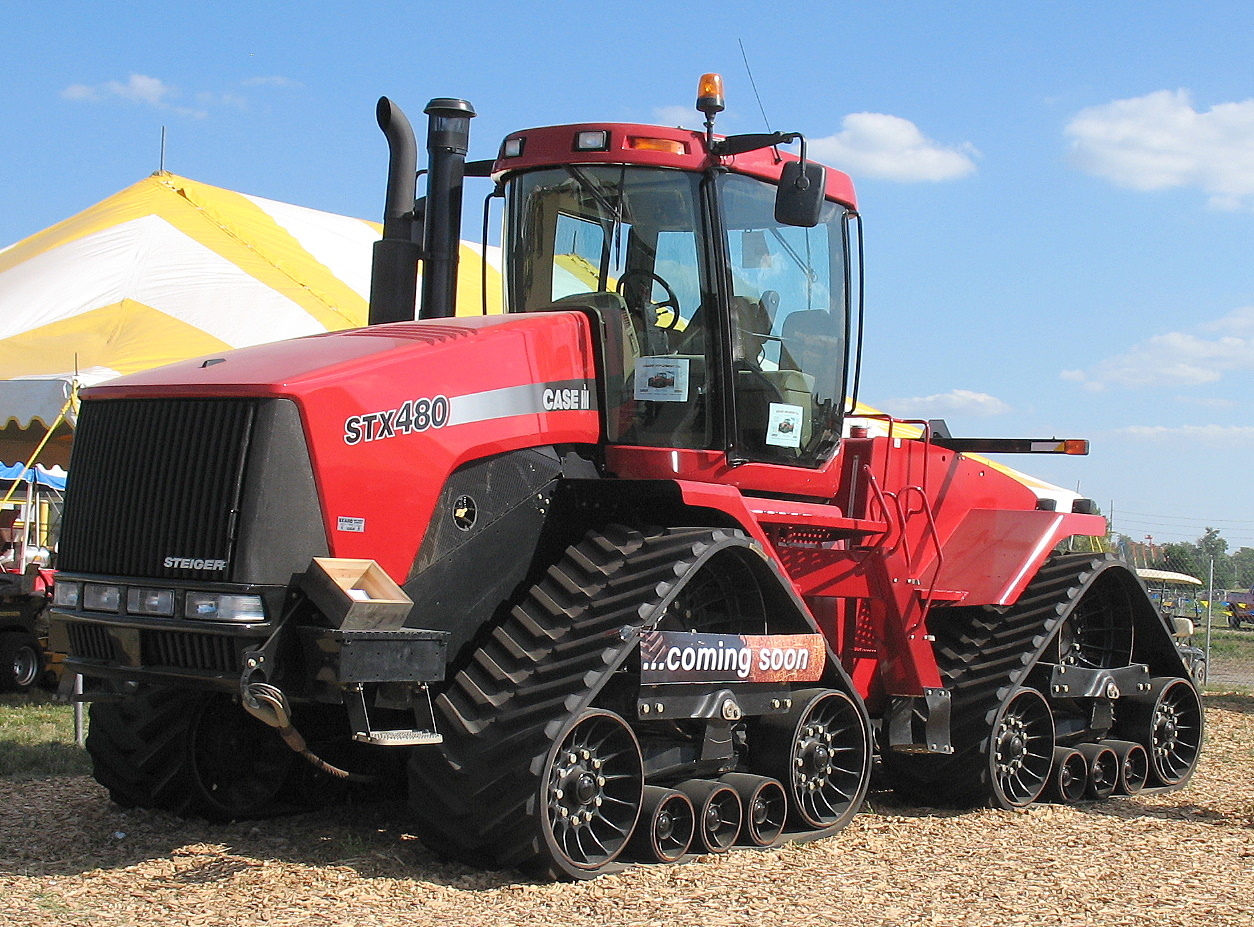
Case STX 480 Steiger

- AFS Connect Steiger Series Years of Production: 2020–present
- Steiger Series Years of Production: 2008–2020
- Steiger STX Series Years of Production: 2000–2008
- 9300 Series Years of Production: 1996–1999
- 9200 Series Years of Production: 1990–1995
- 9100 Series Years of Production: 1986–1989
- 1000 Series Years of Production: 1983–1986
- Series IV Years of Production: 1983–1985 (The Tiger IV was produced from 1984–1988 and ended production as the Case International 9190)
- Industrial Series Years of Production: 1982–1984
- Ford FW Series Years of Production: FW Series 1978–1982
- Series III PT/PTA Years of Production: PT Series 1977–1981/PTA Series 1978–1982
- Series III Years of Production: 1976–1983
- Series II Years of Production: 1974–1976
- Series I Years of Production: 1969–1974
- Barn Series Years of Production: 1963–1969

== See also ==
- Versatile (company) similar large four-wheel drive tractor company from Canada with production also starting from the 1960s
