= Allis-Chalmers =

American industrial machinery manufacturer

- Industry: Industrial machinery, grain-milling machinery, power plant equipment, mining equipment, agricultural machinery, heavy equipment (construction)
- Founded: 1901, West Allis, Wisconsin
- Defunct: 1999
- Successor: AGCO, Allis-Chalmers Energy
- Headquarters: U.S. based, global exports
- Products: Generators, engine-generators, tractors, threshers, combines, farm implements, bulldozers, milling machinery, others

Allis-Chalmers was a U.S. manufacturer of machinery for various industries. Its business lines included agricultural equipment, construction equipment, power generation and power transmission equipment, and machinery for use in industrial settings such as factories, flour mills, sawmills, textile mills, steel mills, refineries, mines, and ore mills.

The first Allis-Chalmers Company was formed in 1901 as an amalgamation of the Edward P. Allis Company (steam engines and mill equipment), Fraser & Chalmers (mining and ore milling equipment), the Gates Iron Works (rock and cement milling equipment), and the industrial business line of the Dickson Manufacturing Company (engines and compressors). It was reorganized in 1912 as the Allis-Chalmers Manufacturing Company. During the next 70 years, its industrial machinery filled countless mills, mines, and factories around the world, and its brand gained fame among consumers mostly from its farm equipment business's orange tractors and silver combine harvesters.

In the 1980s-1990s, a series of divestitures transformed the firm and eventually dissolved it. Its successors are Allis-Chalmers Energy and AGCO.

== History ==
=== Overview ===
Author-photographer Randy Leffingwell (1993) aptly summarized the firm's origins and character. He observed that it "grew by acquiring and consolidating the innovations" of various smaller firms and building upon them; and he continued that "Metal work and machinery were the common background. Financial successes and failures brought them together."

Former marketing executive Walter M. Buescher (1991) said, that Allis-Chalmers "was a conglomerate before the word was coined." Whether or not it is literally true, that Allis-Chalmers predated the sense of "conglomerate" meaning a widely diversified parent corporation, Buescher's point is valid: Allis-Chalmers, despite its common theme of machinery, was an amalgamation of disparate business lines, each with a unique marketplace, beginning in an era when consolidations within industries were fashionable but those across industries were not yet common.

=== 1800s to 1901 ===
Edward P. Allis was an entrepreneur who in 1860 bought a bankrupt firm at a sheriff's auction, the Reliance Works of Milwaukee, Wisconsin, which had been owned by James Decker and Charles Seville. Decker & Seville were millwrights who made equipment for flour milling. Under Allis's management, the firm was reinvigorated and "began producing steam engines and other mill equipment just at the time that many sawmills and flour mills were converting to steam power." Although the financial panic of 1873 "caught Edward Allis overextended" and forced him into bankruptcy, "his own reputation saved him and reorganization came quickly," forming the Edward P. Allis Company. Leffingwell said, "He set out to hire known experts: George Hinkley, who perfected the band saw; William Gray, who revolutionized the flour-milling process through roller milling; and Edwin Reynolds, who ran the Corliss Steam Engine works." Allis died in 1889, but under his sons (Charles Allis and William Allis) and the other principals, the firm continued to prosper, and by 1900 it had grown to become one of America's largest steam engine builders.

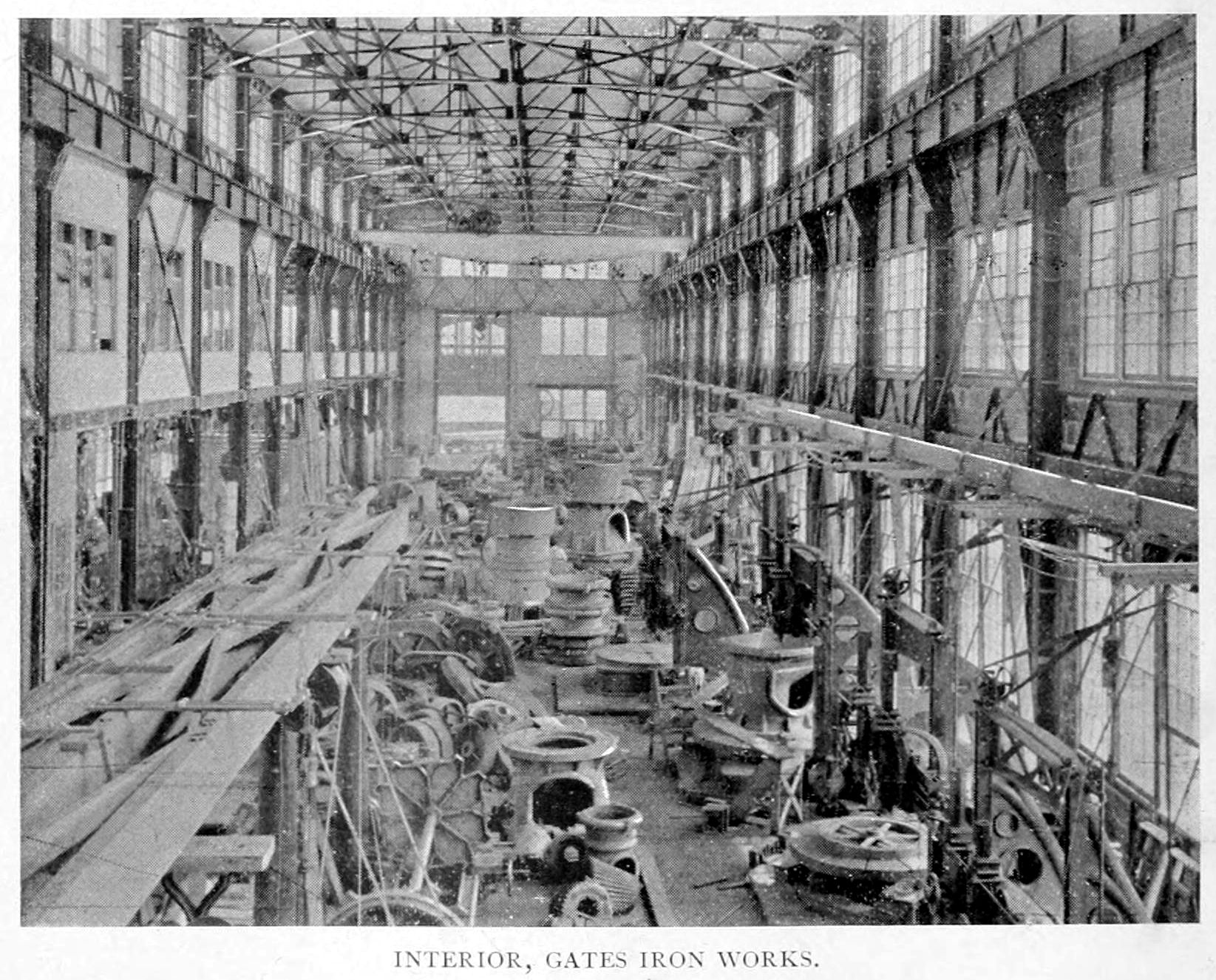
Gates Iron Works, Interior, 1896

Thomas Chalmers was a Scottish immigrant to America who came to the U.S. about 1842. By 1844 he was at Chicago, Illinois and had found work with P.W. Gates, whose foundry and blacksmithing shops produced plows, wagons, and flour-milling equipment. The Gates firm "built the first steam-operated sawmill in the country at a time when Chicago was the leading producer of milled lumber in the country." In 1872, Thomas Chalmers founded the Fraser & Chalmers firm to manufacture mining machinery, boilers, and pumps. By 1880 steam engines were part of the product line and by 1890, the firm had become one of the world's largest manufacturers of mining equipment. Thomas Chalmers's son, William James Chalmers, was president of the company from circa 1890 to 1901. Meanwhile, the Gates Iron Works, with Chalmers family involvement, had become a manufacturer of crushers, pulverizers, and other rock and cement milling equipment.

Another Scottish immigrant family, the Dickson family, came to Canada and the U.S. in the 1830s. By 1852, they had organized a small machine shop and foundry (Dickson & Company) in Scranton, Pennsylvania. In 1856 Thomas Dickson became its president, and in 1862 the firm incorporated as the Dickson Manufacturing Company. By 1900 they were building boilers, steam engines, locomotives, internal combustion engines, blowers, and air compressors.

By 1901 the principals of the Edward P. Allis, Fraser & Chalmers, and Gates firms had decided to merge their companies. Edwin Reynolds believed Allis could control the industrial engine business. In May 1901 the Allis-Chalmers Company was formed. It acquired Dickson's industrial engine business. Dickson's locomotive business was rolled into the new locomotive consolidation, the American Locomotive Company (ALCO).

=== 1901–1911 ===
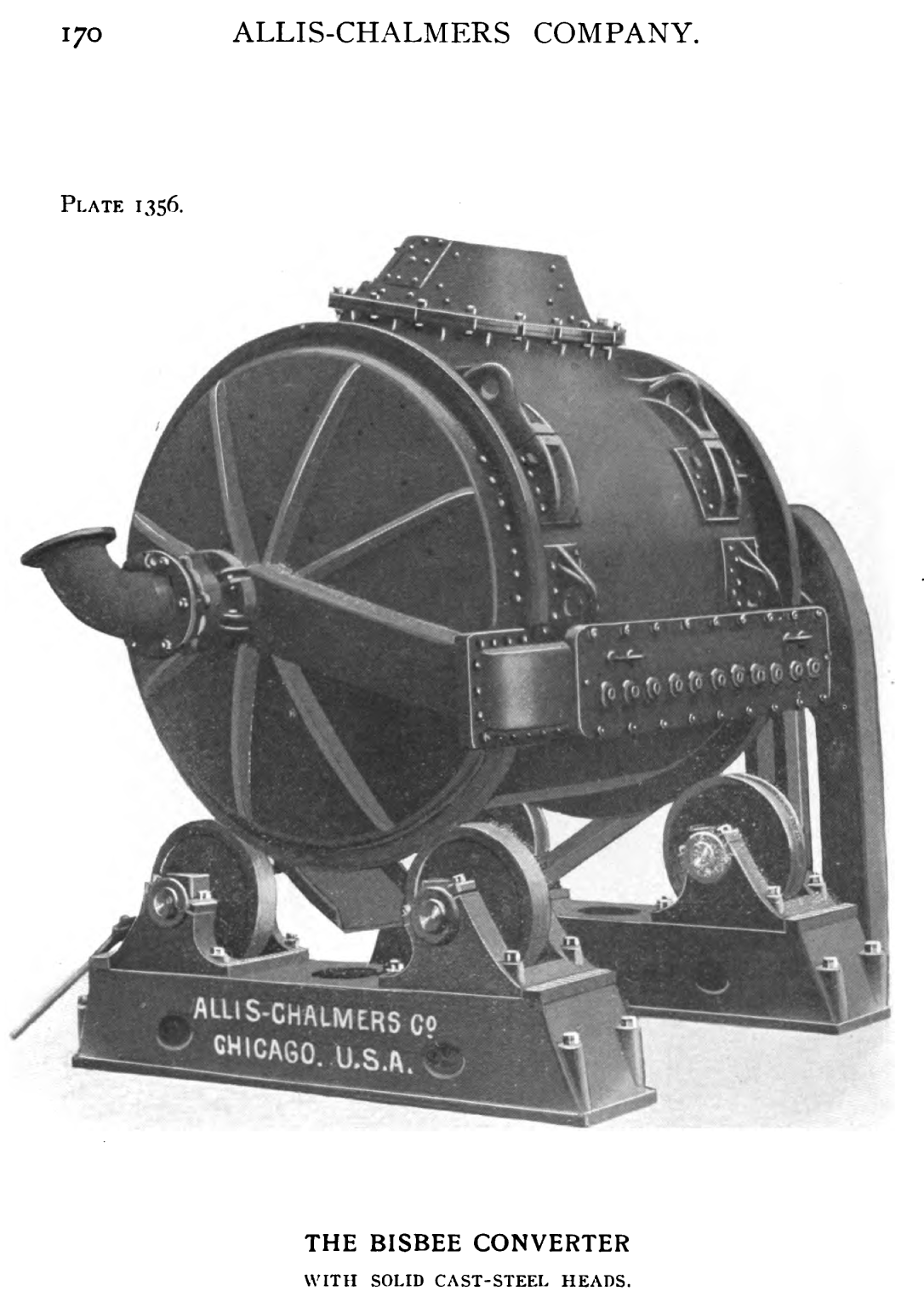
Allis-Chalmers Bisbee converter for smelting copper ore, 1902

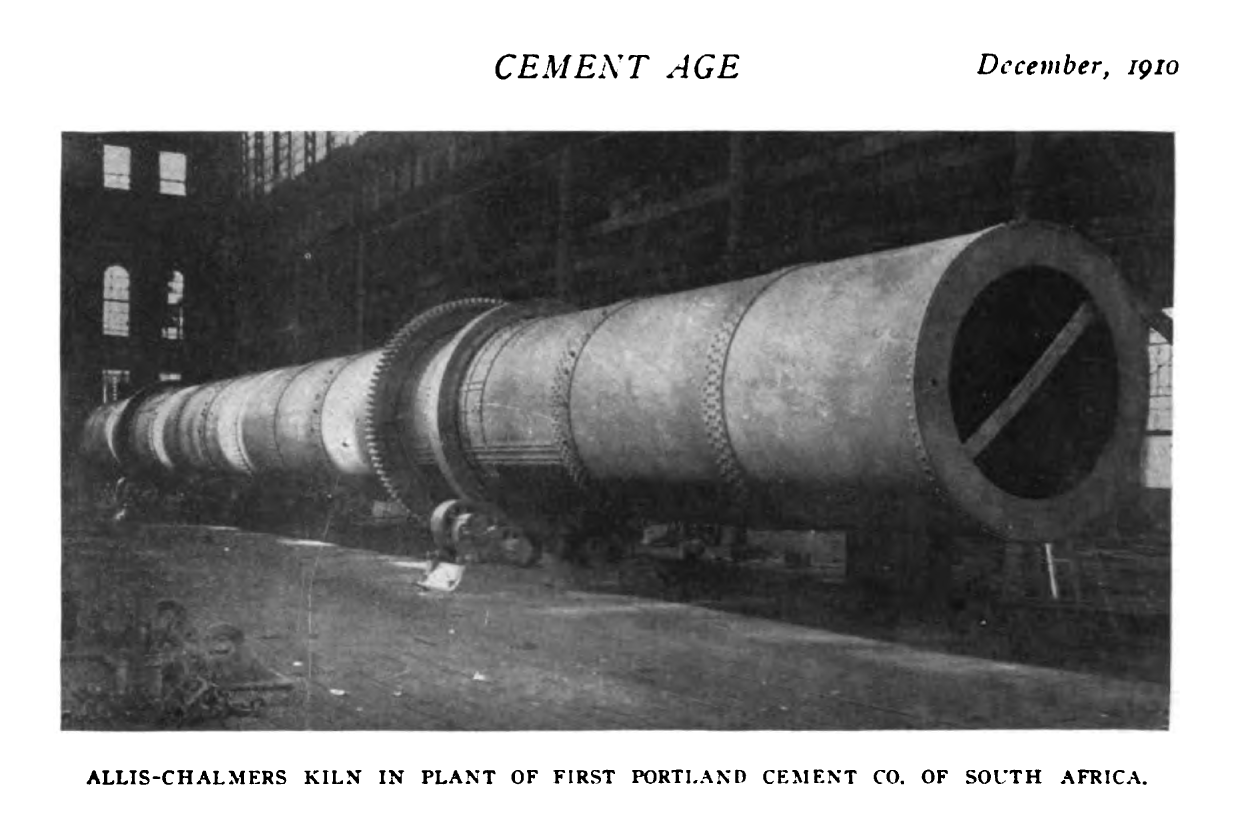
A photo, in the journal Cement Age, 1910, of a rotary cement kiln built by Allis-Chalmers

The managing director of the new company was Charles Allis, his brother William was chairman of the board, and William J. Chalmers was deputy managing director. Shortly after the merger was completed, a new factory was built in an area west of Milwaukee that was then known as North Greenfield. In 1902, with this new factory, the locale was renamed West Allis, Wisconsin.

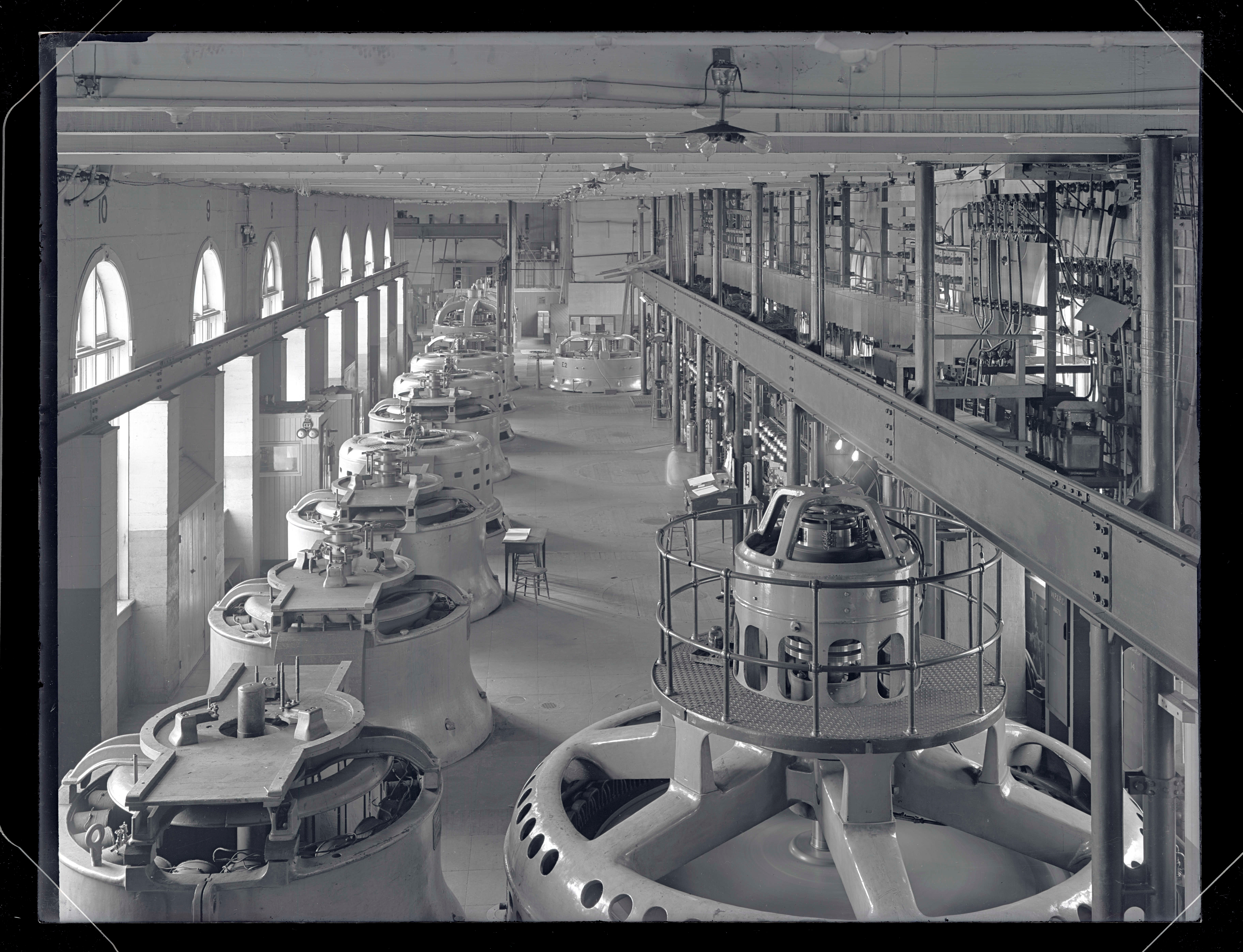
Allis-Chalmers alternator in a Portland General Electric powerhouse, 1911

With the combining of the constituent firms, Allis-Chalmers offered a wide array of pyrometallurgic equipment, such as blast furnaces and converters for roasting, smelting, and refining; ore milling equipment, various kinds of crushers and pulverizers, including stamp mills, roller mills, ball mills, conical mills, rod mills, and jigging mills; cyanidation mills and other concentration mills; hoisting engines; cars, including skip cars, slag cars, and general mine cars; briquetting plants; and the pumps, tanks, boilers, compressors, hydraulic accumulators, pipes, valves, sieves, and conveyors needed within these products. Like other firms that build capital equipment for industrial corporations, it also supplied consulting, erecting, and training services, such as helping a mining company to design a plant, to build its buildings and set up its machinery, and to teach the employees how to use and maintain it.

In 1903, Allis-Chalmers acquired the Bullock Electric Company of Cincinnati, Ohio, which added steam turbines to Allis-Chalmers's powerplant equipment business line.

=== 1912-1919 ===
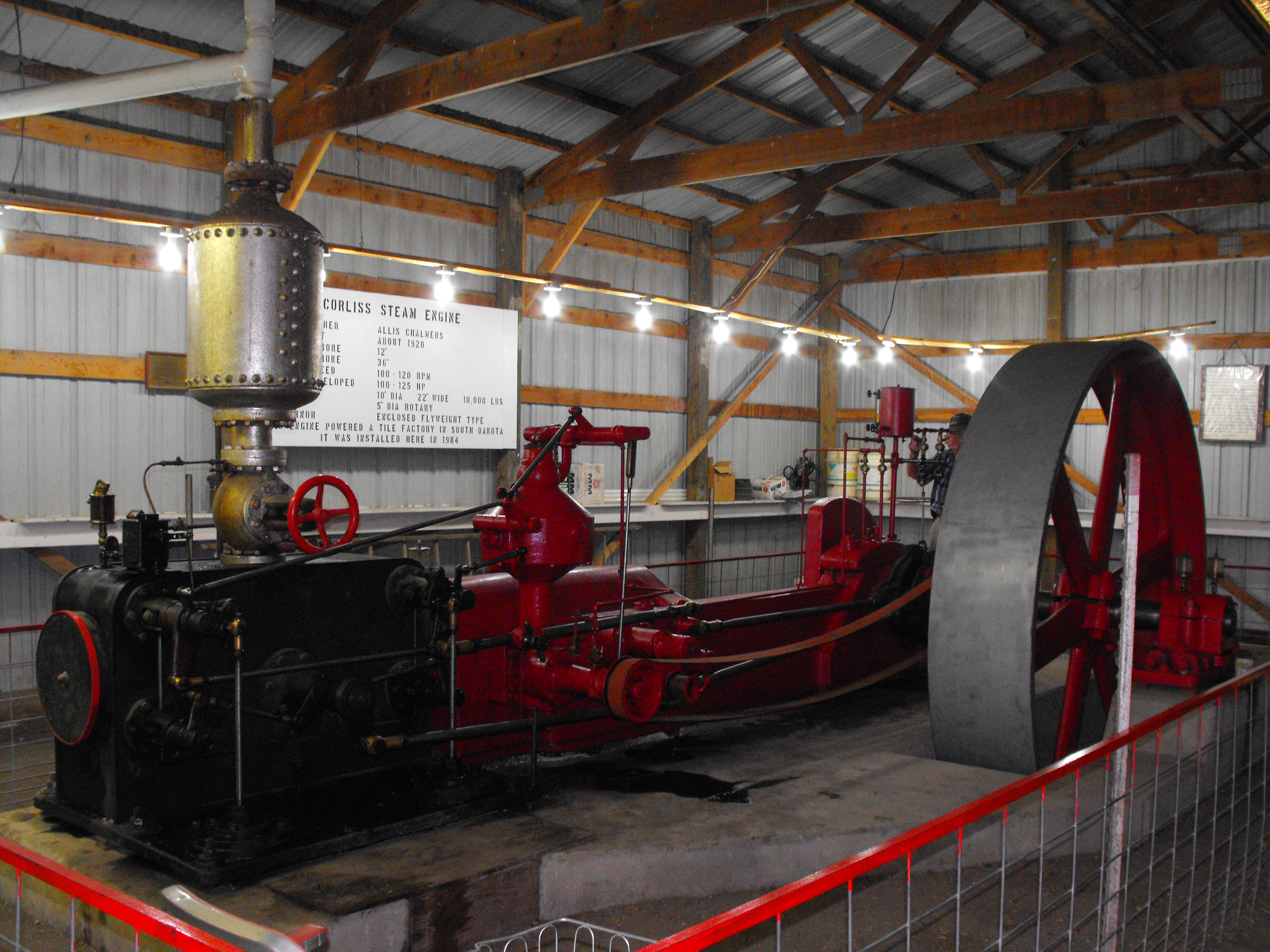
An Allis-Chalmers Corliss type stationary engine.

By 1912, the Allis-Chalmers Company was in financial trouble, so it was reorganized. It was renamed the Allis-Chalmers Manufacturing Company, and Otto Falk, a former Brigadier General of the Wisconsin National Guard, was appointed to turn it around. Falk pushed for new products and new or expanded markets. Falk saw great growth potential in the mechanization of agriculture, which at the time was blossoming all over America. Allis-Chalmers's first farm tractors, the 10-18, the Model 6-12, and the Model 15-30, were developed and marketed between 1914 and 1919, and the farm implement line was expanded.

=== 1920s ===
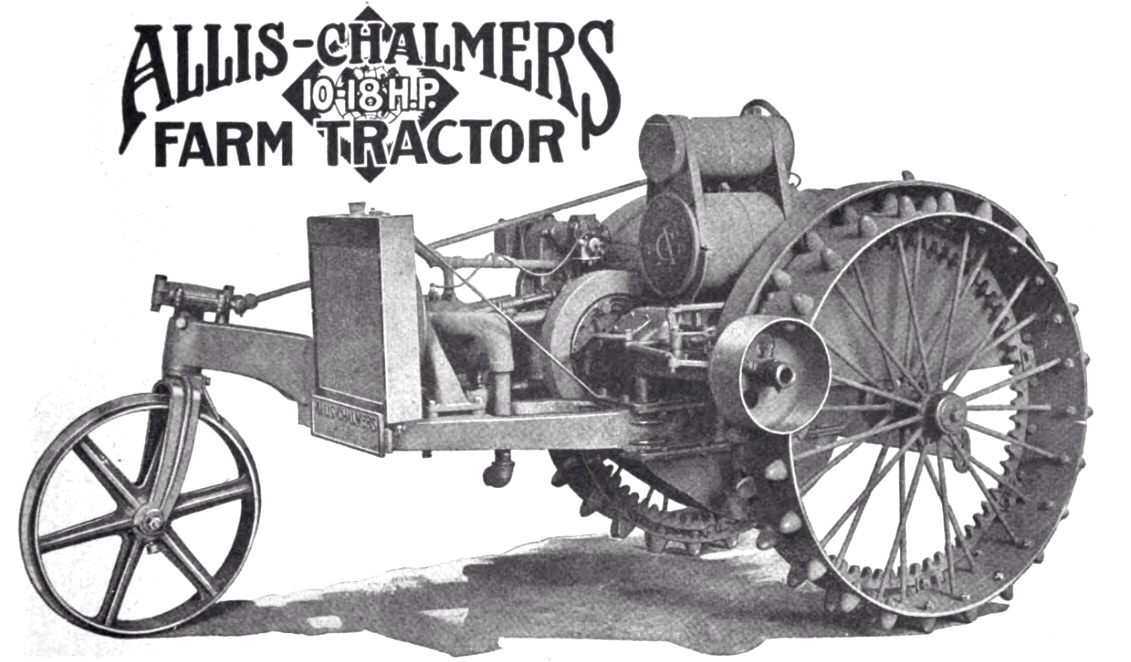
Allis-Chalmers 10-18 (1912-1918)

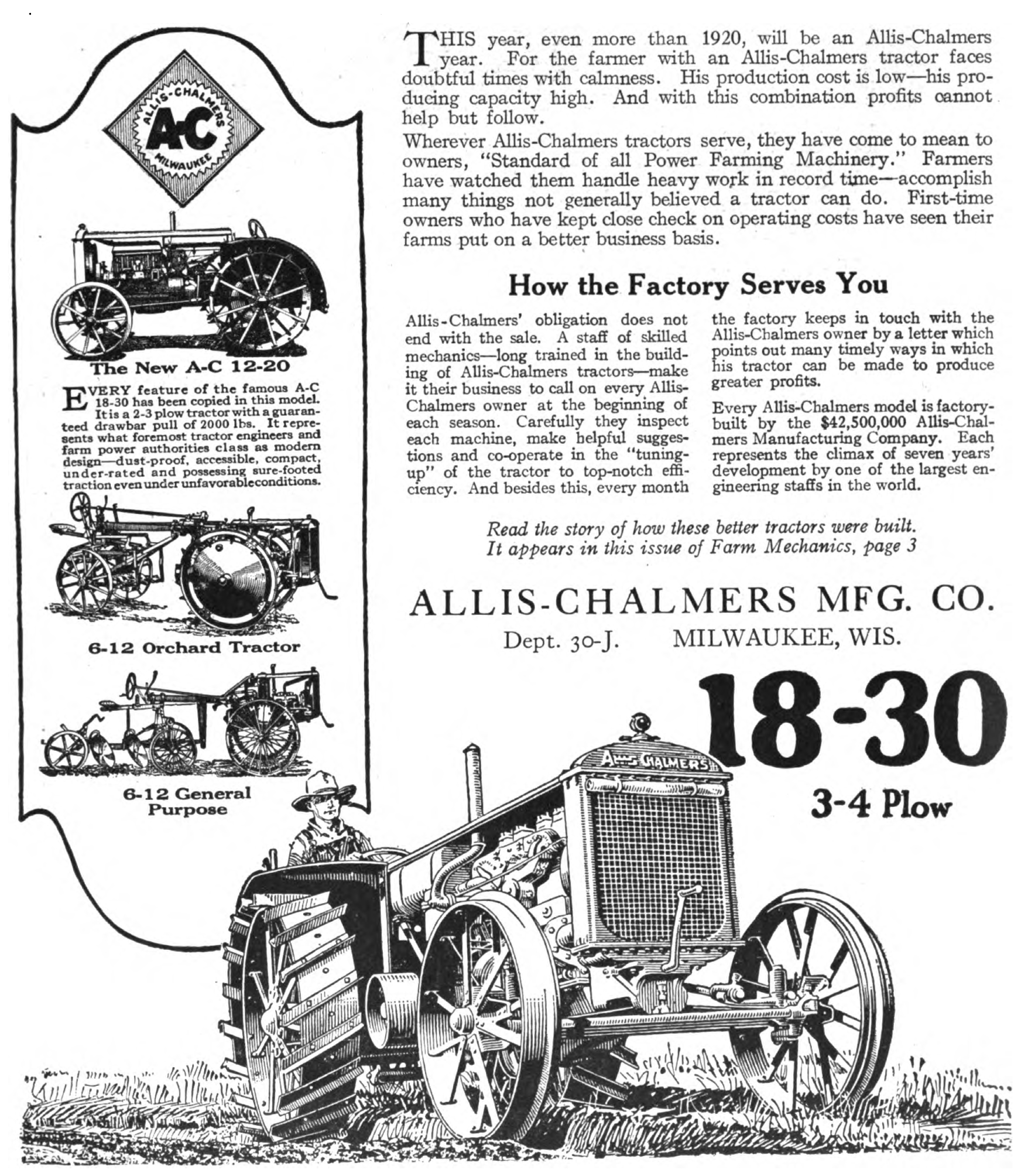
An Allis-Chalmers tractor advertisement in Farm Mechanics, 1921, showing the models 6-12, 12-20, and 18-30

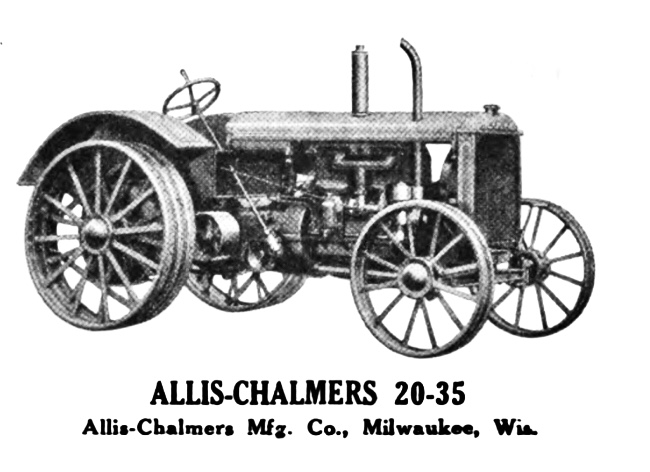
Allis-Chalmers 20-30 (1918-1930)

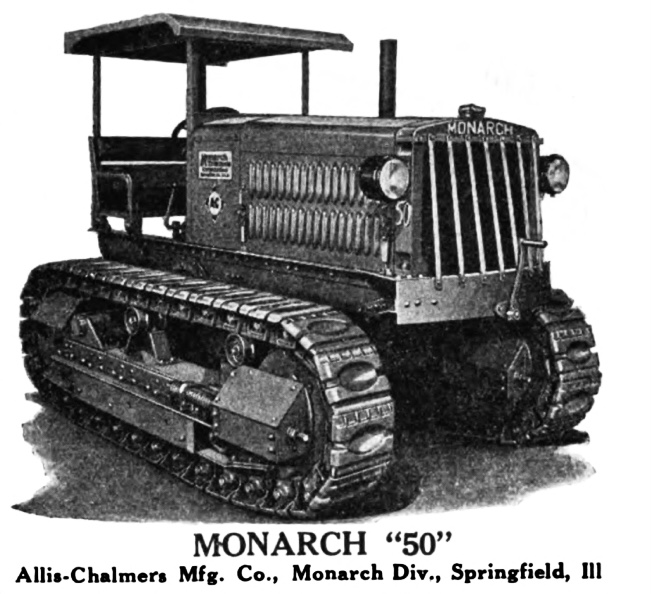
Allis-Chalmers Monarch „50“

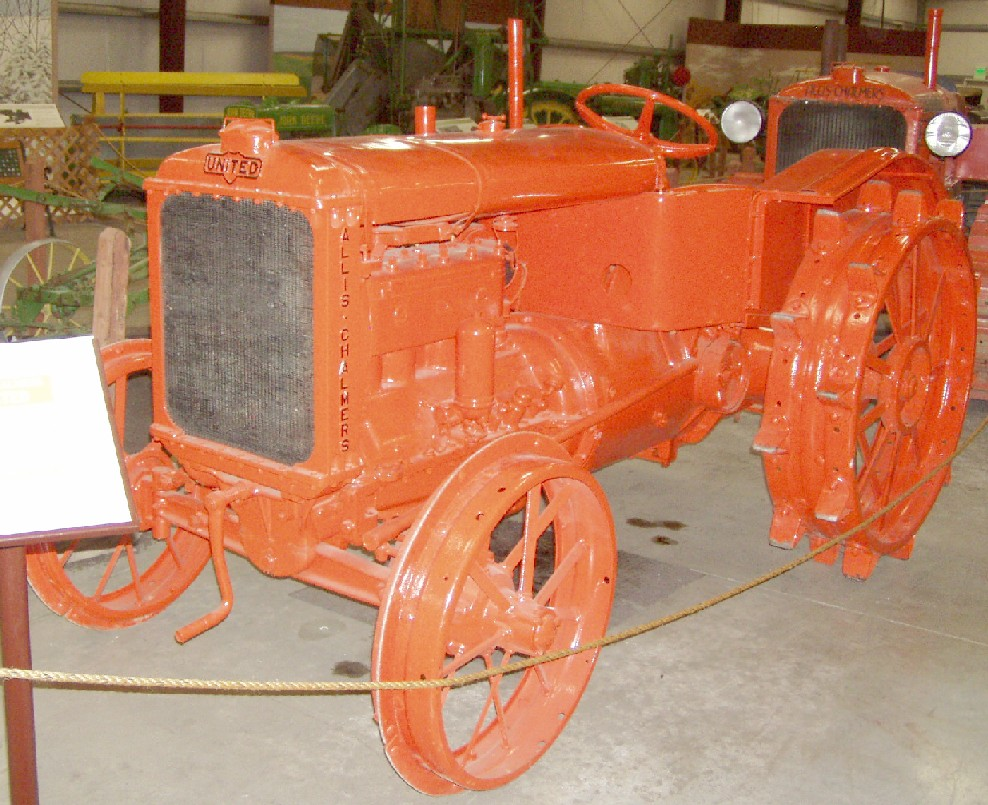
United tractor on display at Heidrick Ag History Center, Woodland, California, U.S.

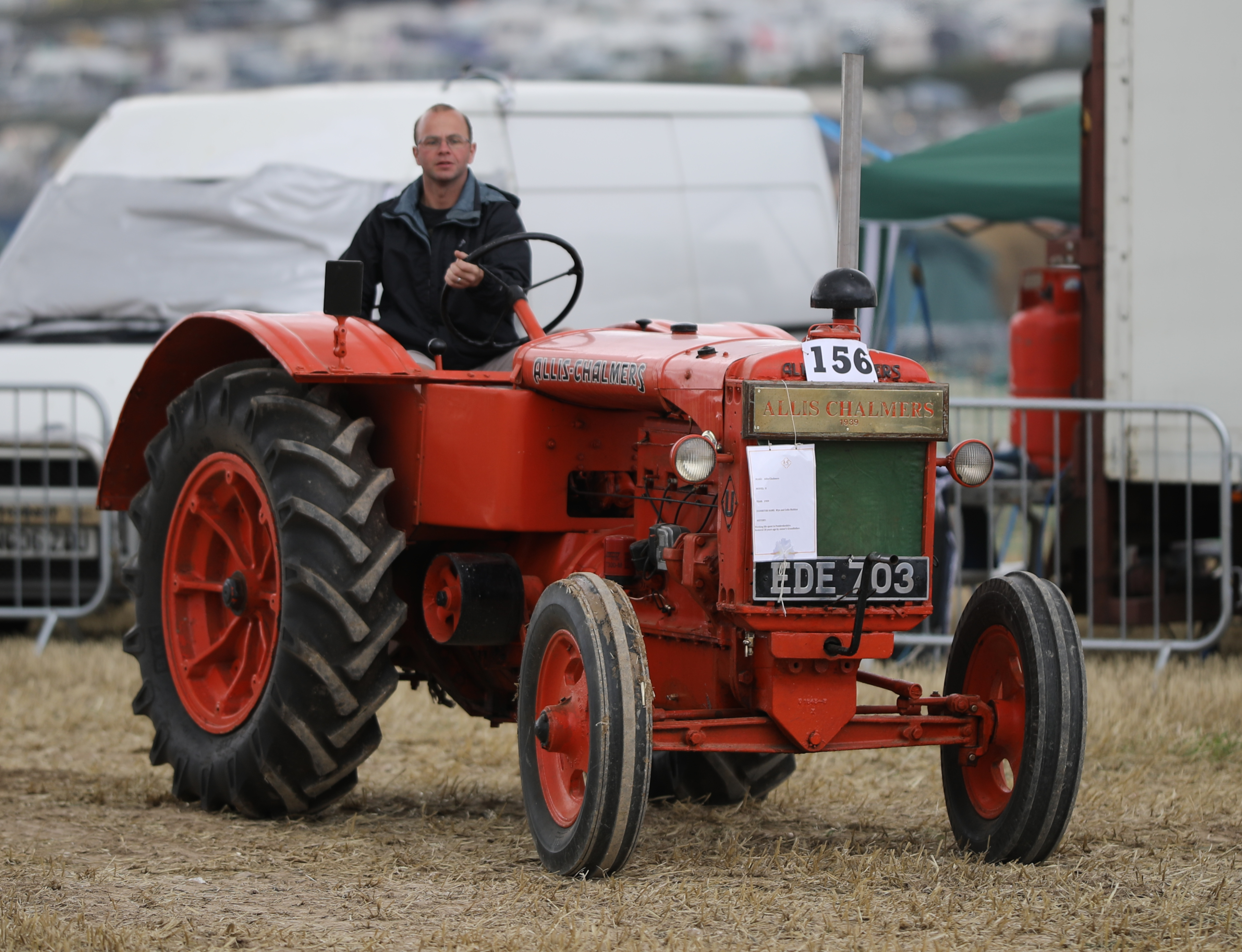
1939 A-C Model U, the successor to the United Tractor

As had also been true of the 1900–1920 period, the Roaring Twenties were a favorable time for consolidation and even conglomeration throughout the business world. It was also a time of strongly continuing mechanization on North American farms. At Allis-Chalmers, the 1920s brought yet more tractors, such as the 18-30, the 12-20, the 15-25, and the United tractor/Model U.

Famed inventor and engineer Nikola Tesla spent the period 1919-1922 working in Milwaukee for Allis-Chalmers.

In 1926 Falk hired Harry Merritt, who would be a senior executive in Allis-Chalmers's tractor business for many years. Merritt had worked in the sales and marketing of various brands of farm and construction equipment, most recently Holt, when Falk hired him away. Walter M. Buescher, who worked under Merritt, credited Merritt with turning around Allis-Chalmers's ailing farm equipment business and transforming it into the main profit center for the parent corporation. He said, "Some say that General Falk pulled Harry Merritt into Milwaukee to liquidate the ailing tractor division. Others say that he was brought in to breathe new life into the moribund and unprofitable operation. Even if the first appraisal is correct, the second proved to be the way it turned out. […] After Merritt's arrival, the profit picture changed. The farm equipment business proved to be a financial lifesaver for the corporation. […] From next to nothing in 1927, Merritt saw the percentage of farm equipment business go to just short of sixty percent of corporate sales."

Also in 1926, Allis-Chalmers acquired Nordyke Marmon & Company of Indianapolis, Indiana, a maker of flour-milling equipment. In 1927, it acquired the Pittsburgh Transformer Company, a maker of electrical transformers.

In 1928, Allis-Chalmers acquired the Monarch Tractor Company of Springfield, Illinois, thus adding a line of crawler tractors. In 1929, it acquired the La Crosse Plow Works of La Crosse, Wisconsin. The La Crosse Plow Works had a good-quality plow and various desirable implements, which now expanded the Allis-Chalmers implement line. Also in 1929, Harry Merritt was in California when the bright orange California poppy blossoms inspired him to think about the use of bright colors in marketing. Brightly colored things that can be seen from far away had potential in farm equipment marketing. He soon changed the paint color of Allis-Chalmers's tractors to Persian Orange, the available paint color that he felt most closely resembled the California poppy's color. Thus began the tradition of orange Allis-Chalmers tractors. Various competitors would follow suit over the next decade, as International Harvester switched to all-red (1936), Minneapolis-Moline switched to Prairie Gold (late 1930s), and Case switched to Flambeau Red (late 1930s). John Deere already had a distinctive color scheme with its bright green and yellow.

In 1928, Henry Ford canceled U.S. production of the Fordson tractor. This disrupted the business of many firms: farm equipment dealers who sold Fordsons and aftermarket equipment builders whose attachments were designed to mount on Fordsons (for example, the Gleaner combines of the 1920s mounted on Fordsons, and many Fordson industrial tractors used aftermarket attachments). Many of these firms formed a conglomerate in 1928 called the United Tractor & Equipment corporation. United arranged a deal with Allis-Chalmers to build a tractor to substitute for the now-missing Fordson. Around 1930, the United conglomerate collapsed. The reasons that various authors have given have been disagreements between its investors, the onset of the Great Depression, and the fact that Ford Motor Company Ltd of England, which was continuing the Fordson line independently of the U.S. Ford company, began exporting new Fordsons to America. The United tractor became the Allis-Chalmers Model U.

=== 1930s ===
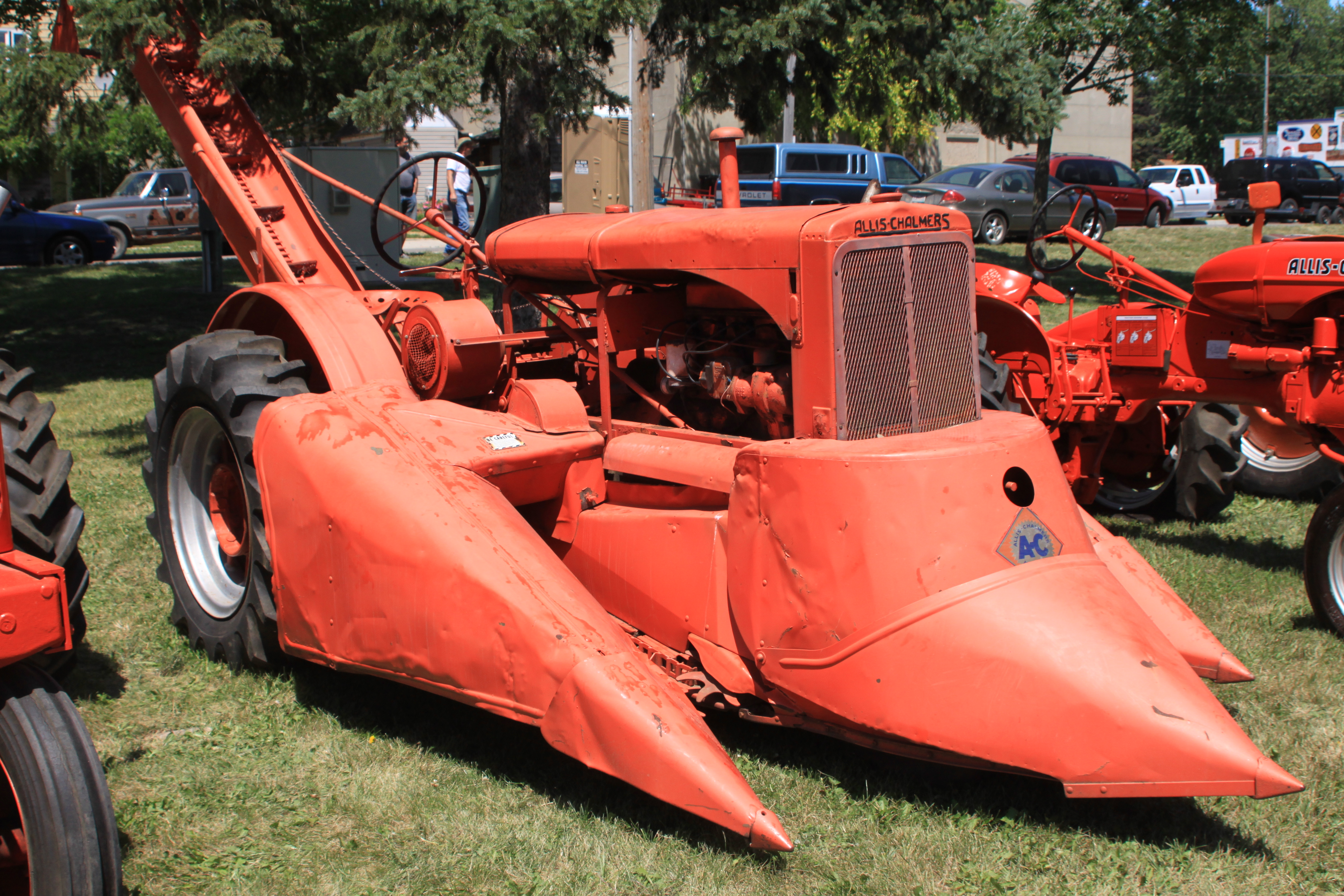
A two-row corn picker

The 1930s were a pivotal decade. Despite the Great Depression, Allis-Chalmers succeeded as demand for its machinery continued.

In 1931, it acquired Advance-Rumely of La Porte, Indiana, mostly because Merritt wanted the company's network of 24 branch houses and about 2,500 dealers, which would greatly increase Allis-Chalmers's marketing and sales power in the farm equipment business. Also in 1931, the corporation's electrical equipment business expanded via acquisition when Brown, Boveri & Cie, in a financial pinch because of the Depression, sold its U.S. electrical operations to Allis-Chalmers. After 1931 Allis-Chalmers was the licensee for U.S. sales of European products of Brown, Boveri & Cie.

In 1932, Allis-Chalmers collaborated with Firestone to introduce pneumatic rubber tires to tractors. The innovation quickly spread industry-wide, as (to many farmers' surprise) it improved tractive force and fuel economy in the range of 10% to 20%. Within only 5 years, pneumatic rubber tires had displaced cleated steel wheels across roughly half of all tractors sold industry-wide. Cleated steel remained optional equipment into the 1940s. Also in 1932, Allis-Chalmers acquired the Ryan Manufacturing Company, which added various grader models to its construction equipment line.

In 1933, Allis-Chalmers introduced its Model WC, its first-generation row-crop tractor, which would become its highest-selling tractor ever. In 1937, its lighter and more affordable second-generation row-crop, the Model B, arrived, and also became a top seller. Its All-Crop Harvester was the market leader in pull-type (tractor-drawn) combine harvesters.

In October 1937, Allis-Chalmers was one of fourteen major electrical manufacturing companies that went to court to change the way labor unions excluded contractors and products in the building trades through the union use of the "Men and Means Clause". The action of Allis-Chalmers and others eventually resulted in the U.S. Supreme Court decision of June 18, 1945, that ended certain union practices that violated the Sherman Antitrust Act.

=== 1940s ===
World War II caused Allis-Chalmers, like most other manufacturing companies, to become extremely busy. As happened with many firms, its civilian product lines experienced a period of being "on hold", with emphasis on parts and service to keep existing machines running, but its war materiel production was pushed to the maximum of productivity and output. In the late 1930s through mid-1940s, Allis-Chalmers made machinery for naval ships, such as Liberty ship steam engines, steam turbines, generators, and electric motors; artillery tractors and tractors for other army use; electrical switches and controls; and other products. Allis-Chalmers was also one of many firms contracted to build equipment for the Manhattan Project. Its experience in mining and milling machinery made it a logical choice for uranium mining and processing equipment. Allis-Chalmers ranked 45th among United States corporations in the value of wartime military production contracts.

Immediately at the war's end, in 1945–1946, Allis-Chalmers endured a crippling 11-month labor strike. Buescher was convinced that the corporation never entirely recovered from the effects of this strike. This seems debatable given the various successes that Allis-Chalmers did have during the next 30 years, including prosperity in the farm equipment business in the 1950s and 1960s. But it certainly gave competitors a chance to grab market share.

After WWII some companies refused to sell equipment to Japanese farmers. Allis-Chalmers dealers did not hesitate to sell to these farmers so many farms to this day still have an Allis-Chalmers tractor in Oregon.

In 1948, the Model WC was improved with various new features and became the Model WD, another top seller. The WD was a milestone for the company. It included fully independent power take off, which was powered by a two clutch system. It also included power adjust rear wheels, which became an industry standard. Production of this model continued into 1953, with nearly 150,000 tractors produced.

=== 1950s ===
The 1950s were a time of great demand for more power in farm tractors, as well as greater capability from their hydraulic and electrical systems. It was also a decade of extensive dieselization, from railroad locomotives to farm tractors and construction equipment. In 1953, Allis-Chalmers acquired the Buda Engine Company of Harvey, Illinois. Allis wanted Buda for its line of diesel engines, because its previous supplier, Detroit Diesel, was a division of General Motors, whose recent acquisition of the Euclid heavy equipment company now made it a competitor of Allis-Chalmers for construction equipment business. The Buda-Lanova models were re-christened the "Allis-Chalmers Diesel" engine line. Diesel engineers were busy during the following years updating and expanding the line.

In 1952, the company acquired Laplant-Choate, which added various models of scrapers to its construction equipment line.

In 1953, the WD-45 was introduced, replacing the WD. The motor was increased to 226 cubic inches, giving it 30 horsepower on the drawbar at the Nebraska Tests. This was almost double the horsepower of the WD. A new Allis chalmers designed Snap- Coupler hitch was used. It allowed the operator to hook up to an implement from the seat of the tractor. A Buda diesel-powered WD-45 was introduced in 1955. This series stayed in production until the unveiling of the D-series in 1957.

In 1955, the company acquired Gleaner Manufacturing Company, which was an important move for its combine harvester business. Allis was the market leader in pull-type (tractor-drawn) combines, with its All-Crop Harvester line. But acquiring Gleaner meant that it would now also be a leader in self-propelled machines, and it would own two of the leading brands in combines. The Gleaner line augmented (and later superseded) the All-Crop Harvester line, and for several years Gleaner's profits made up nearly all of Allis-Chalmers' profit. Gleaners continued to be manufactured at the same factory, in Independence, Missouri, after the acquisition.

In 1957, the Allis-Chalmers D Series of tractors was introduced. It enjoyed great success over the next decade.

In 1959, Allis-Chalmers acquired the French company Vendeuvre. Also in 1959, it acquired Tractomotive Corporation of Deerfield, Illinois, which it had been partnering with as an auxiliary equipment supplier for at least a decade.

In Haycraft's history of the construction equipment business (2000), he expressed the view that Allis-Chalmers relied too heavily for too long on partnering with auxiliary equipment suppliers, and acquiring them, instead of investing in in-house product development. In his view, this strategy limited the company's success in this business, and it eventually had to spend the development dollars anyway. Buescher's comments about the Buda acquisition and the need for subsequent improvement of its designs seem to corroborate this view. However, the topic is multivariate and complex; elsewhere in his memoir, Buescher presents a viewpoint in which investing in research and product development is an expensive move that often does not pay off for the innovator and mostly benefits competitor clones.

=== 1960s and 1970s ===
In 1960, the U.S. government uncovered an attempt to form a cartel in the heavy electric equipment industry. It charged 13 companies, including the largest in the industry (Westinghouse, General Electric, and Allis-Chalmers), with price fixing and bid rigging. Most feigned innocence, but Allis-Chalmers pleaded guilty. Although one motive for the forming of cartels is so that amply profitable firms can try to become obscenely profitable, it did not apply in this instance, according to Buescher; rather, his view of the attempt at a heavy-electrical cartel was that it was a desperate (and foolish) attempt to turn red ink to black ink among fierce competition.

The D series continued to be successful in the 1960s. The factory-installed turbocharger on the D19 was the first in the industry. It was soon followed by the 190 and the 190 XT, which was a direct competitor for the John Deere Model 4020 with 98 horsepower (factory rating).

In 1965, Allis-Chalmers acquired Simplicity for its line of lawn and garden equipment. Also in that year, the nuclear reactor SAFARI-1, a research reactor built by Allis-Chalmers, went into operation.

In the 1960s, the farm equipment, construction equipment, and heavy electrical industries were not as profitable for Allis-Chalmers as they had been in the 1930s through 1950s. Reasonable prosperity continued in the farm equipment line, but the economics of all the industries shifted toward greater uncertainty and brittler success for firms that didn't become number one or two in a field. Allis-Chalmers was often number three or four, as Deere and International Harvester led in farm machinery, Caterpillar and Case led in construction, and Westinghouse and General Electric led in heavy electric markets. In the late 1960s, a trend of conglomeration flared, as mega-conglomerates like Ling-Temco-Vought, Gulf+Western, and White Consolidated Industries went on buying sprees. Several takeover attempts by those firms were made on Allis-Chalmers. It was during the same era and business climate that Tenneco acquired Case.

In 1960, Allis-Chalmers built the first grate-kiln ore pellet plant at the Humboldt mine in Michigan. The company eventually built about 50 such plants.

In 1974, Allis-Chalmers's construction equipment business was reorganized into a joint venture with Fiat, which bought a 65% majority stake at the outset. The new company was called Fiatallis.

In May 1975, the company closed its 20-acre, 78-year-old Pittsburgh North Side factory that employed close to 1,100 full-time and produced both distribution and instrument control transformers.

In 1977, to compete in the recently expanding market segment of compact diesel utility tractors (such as the Kubota line and the Ford 1000 and 1600 built by Shibaura), Allis-Chalmers began importing Hinomoto tractors with Toyosha diesel engines from Japan. They were rebadged with the Allis-Chalmers brand for U.S. sales.

In 1978, a joint venture with Siemens, Siemens-Allis, was formed, supplying electrical control equipment.

=== 1980s and 1990s ===
The company began to struggle in the 1980s in a climate of rapid economic change. It was forced amid financial struggles to sell major business lines.

In 1983, Allis-Chalmers sold Simplicity, the lawn and garden equipment division, to the division's management.

1985 was a year of great dissolution for Allis-Chalmers—the year when it folded three of its main business lines:

- The Fiat-Allis joint venture in construction equipment, over which the firms' managements had long since had a falling-out, ended when Fiat bought out Allis's remaining minority stake. It renamed the company Fiatallis.
- The Allis-Chalmers farm equipment business line ended when Allis sold it to K-H-D (Klöckner-Humboldt-Deutz, Deutz AG) of Germany, at the time the owner of Deutz-Fahr. K-H-D renamed the business as Deutz-Allis and discarded the Allis Chalmers 8000 Series tractors and Persian Orange branding in favor of spring green tractors built by White Farm Equipment with Deutz air cooled engines.
- The Siemens-Allis joint venture in electrical controls ended when Siemens bought out Allis's remaining minority stake. Siemens then blended the company into the Siemens Energy and Automation division.

In 1988, Allis-Chalmers sold its American Air Filter filtration business (with 27 production facilities internationally and sales into 100-plus countries) for approximately $225 million to SnyderGeneral Corporation of Dallas, a leading global air quality control firm.

In 1990, Deutz-Allis was sold to its management and became Allis-Gleaner Corporation (AGCO). Tractors began selling under the AGCO-Allis name and were again painted Persian Orange. The AGCO brand of orange tractors was produced until 2011 when AGCO announced that it was phasing out the brand.

In 1998, what remained of the Allis-Chalmers manufacturing businesses were divested, and in January 1999, the company officially closed its Milwaukee offices. The remaining service businesses became Allis-Chalmers Energy in Houston, Texas.

=== Brand reuse, 2000 to present ===
In August 2008, Briggs & Stratton announced that it would sell lawn tractors under the Allis-Chalmers brand name.

== Former sites ==
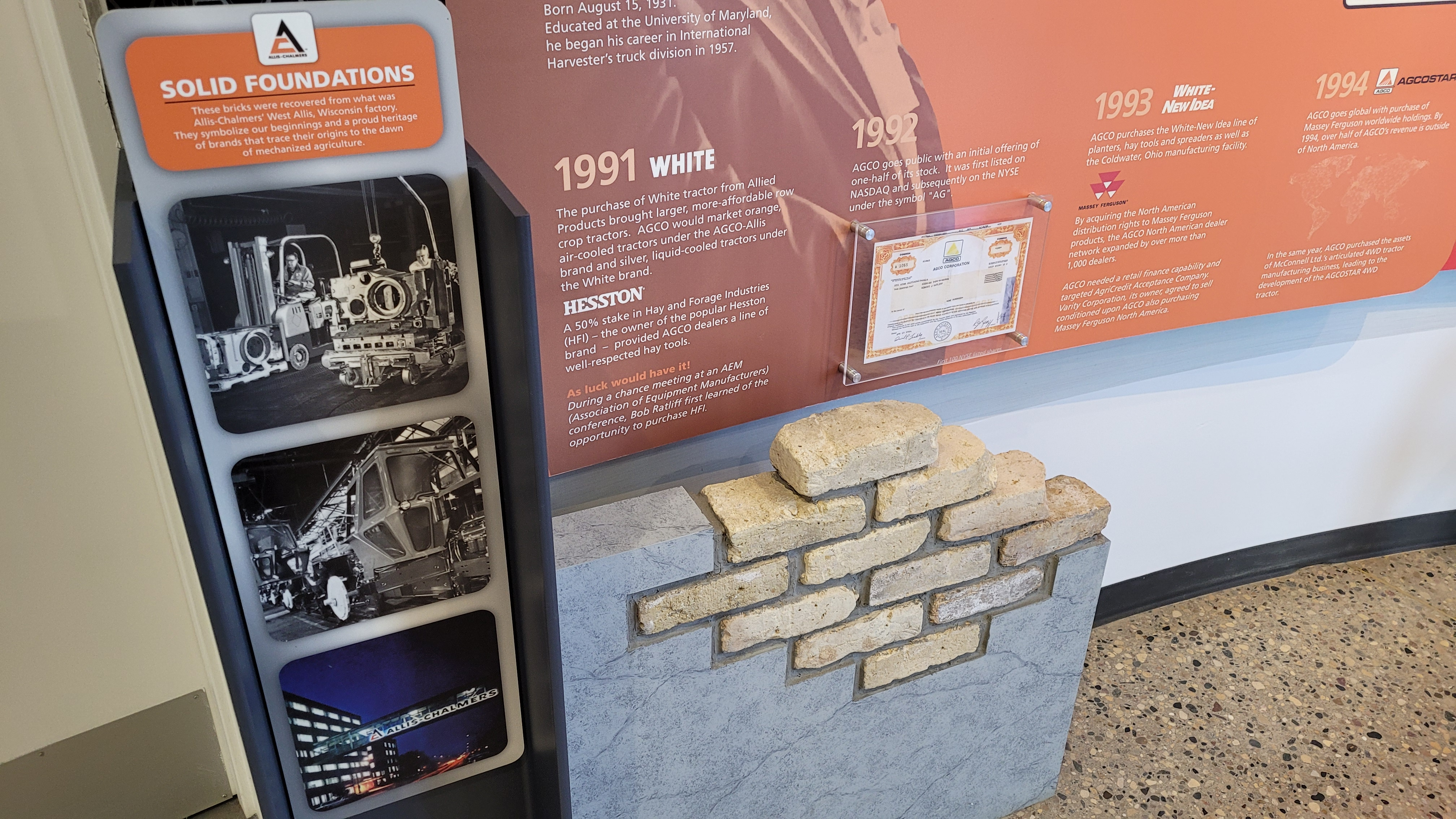
Bricks from West Allis, WI Factory

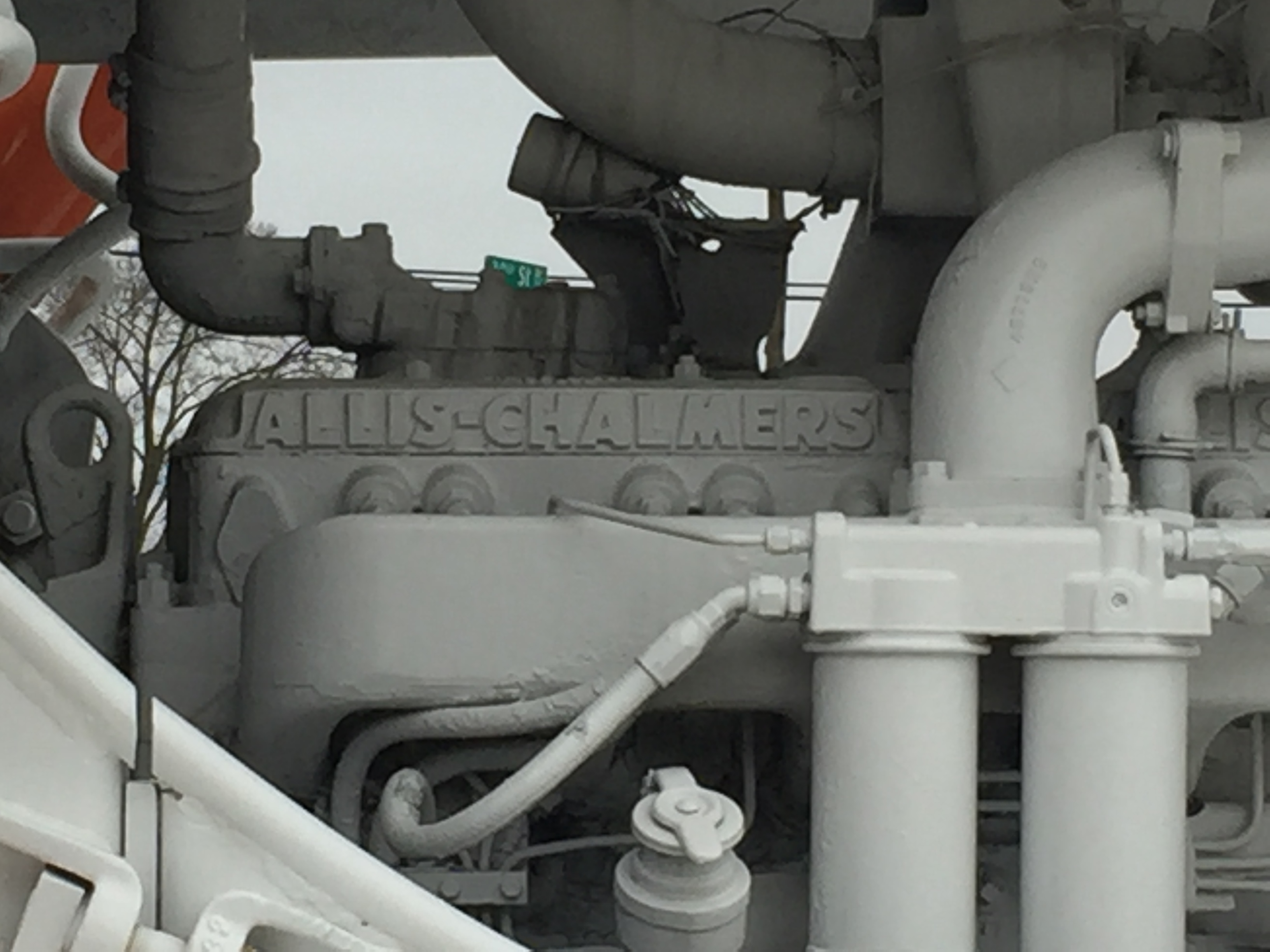
Allis-Chalmers Engine Block

Location	Purpose	Other Facts
Milwaukee, Wisconsin	Corporate offices	
West Allis, Wisconsin	Wheeled Tractor Plant, Power and Industrial Equipment	
Appleton, Wisconsin	Paper Making Machinery Plant	
Independence, Missouri	Gleaner Combine Plant	Site inherited from Gleaner Manufacturing Company
La Porte, Indiana	Harvest Equipment and Mower Plant	Site inherited from Advance-Rumely
La Crosse, Wisconsin	Farm Implement Plant	Site inherited from La Crosse Plow Works
Terre Haute, Indiana	Switchgear Assembly, Transformer Tanks, Transformers	
Gadsden, Alabama	Rear Engine Tractor and Electrical Transformer Plant	
Springfield, Illinois	Crawler Tractor, Motor Grader, Bulldozer, and Snow plow Plant	Site inherited from the Monarch Tractor Company acquisition
Deerfield, Illinois	Wheeled Loader and Tractor Shovel Plant	Site inherited from the Tractomotive Corporation acquisition
Wauwatosa, Wisconsin	Wheeled Loader and Tractor Shovel Plant, Fuel Cell R&D Center	
Cedar Rapids, Iowa	Motor Scraper, Pull-Type Scraper, Motor Wagon Plant	
Norwood, Ohio	Pumps and Motors	Purchased by Siemens Corporation in 1985 and still presently operating
York, Pennsylvania	Hydraulic Turbines and Valves	Now owned by Voith and still operating
Oxnard, California	Special Deep Tillage Tools	
Harvey, Illinois	Fork Lift Truck, Diesel, Natural Gas, Butane, and Gasoline Engine Plant	Site inherited from the Buda Engine acquisition
St. Thomas, Ontario, Canada	Electric Motor and Diesel Locomotive Controls	
Lachine, Quebec, Canada	Industrial Equipment	
Boston, Massachusetts	Circuit Breakers	
Pittsburgh, Pennsylvania	Electrical Transformers	
Lexington, South Carolina	Lawn and Garden Equipment, Terra Tiger plant	

== Agricultural machinery ==
Allis-Chalmers offered a complete line of agricultural machinery, from tillage and harvesting to tractors.

=== Tractor models ===
In 1959, a team led by Harry Ihrig built a 15 kW fuel cell tractor for Allis-Chalmers which was demonstrated across the US at state fairs. This was the first fuel-cell-powered vehicle. Potassium hydroxide served as the electrolyte. The original AC fuel cell tractor is currently on display at the Smithsonian.

Below is a gallery showcasing some of the models that Allis-Chalmers produced throughout its history, most of which are painted in their distinctive orange paint.

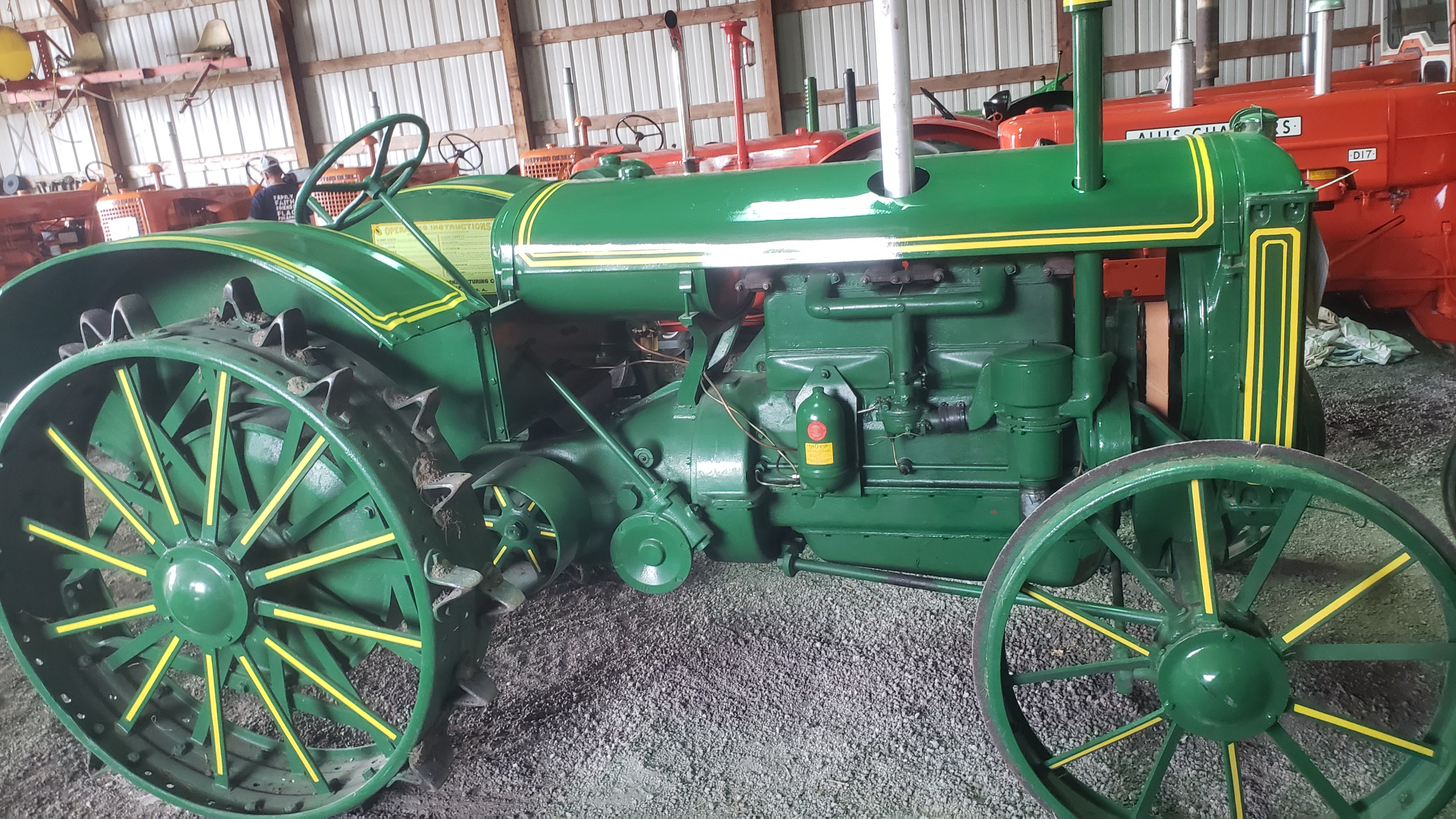
A-C Model 20-35

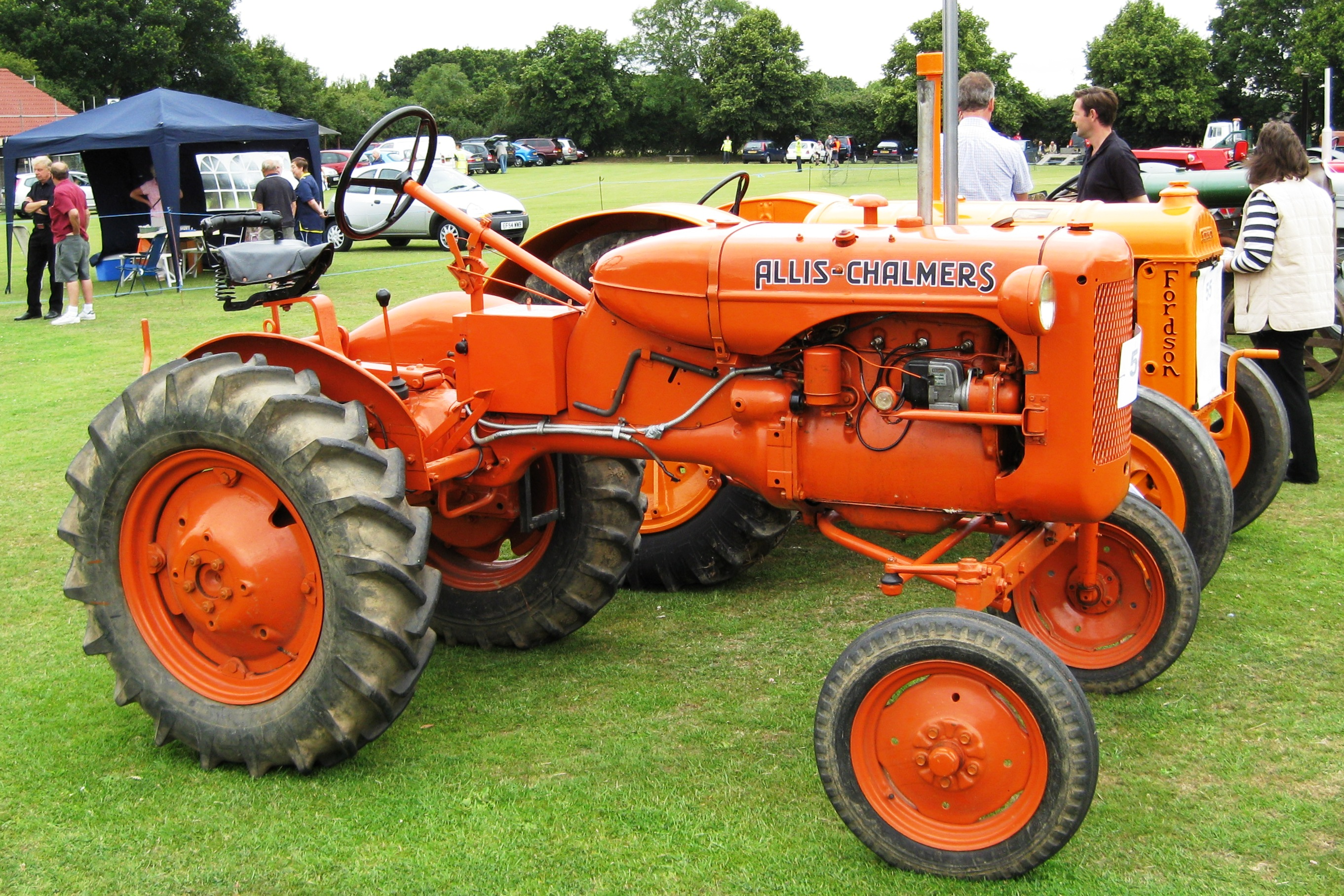
A-C Model B

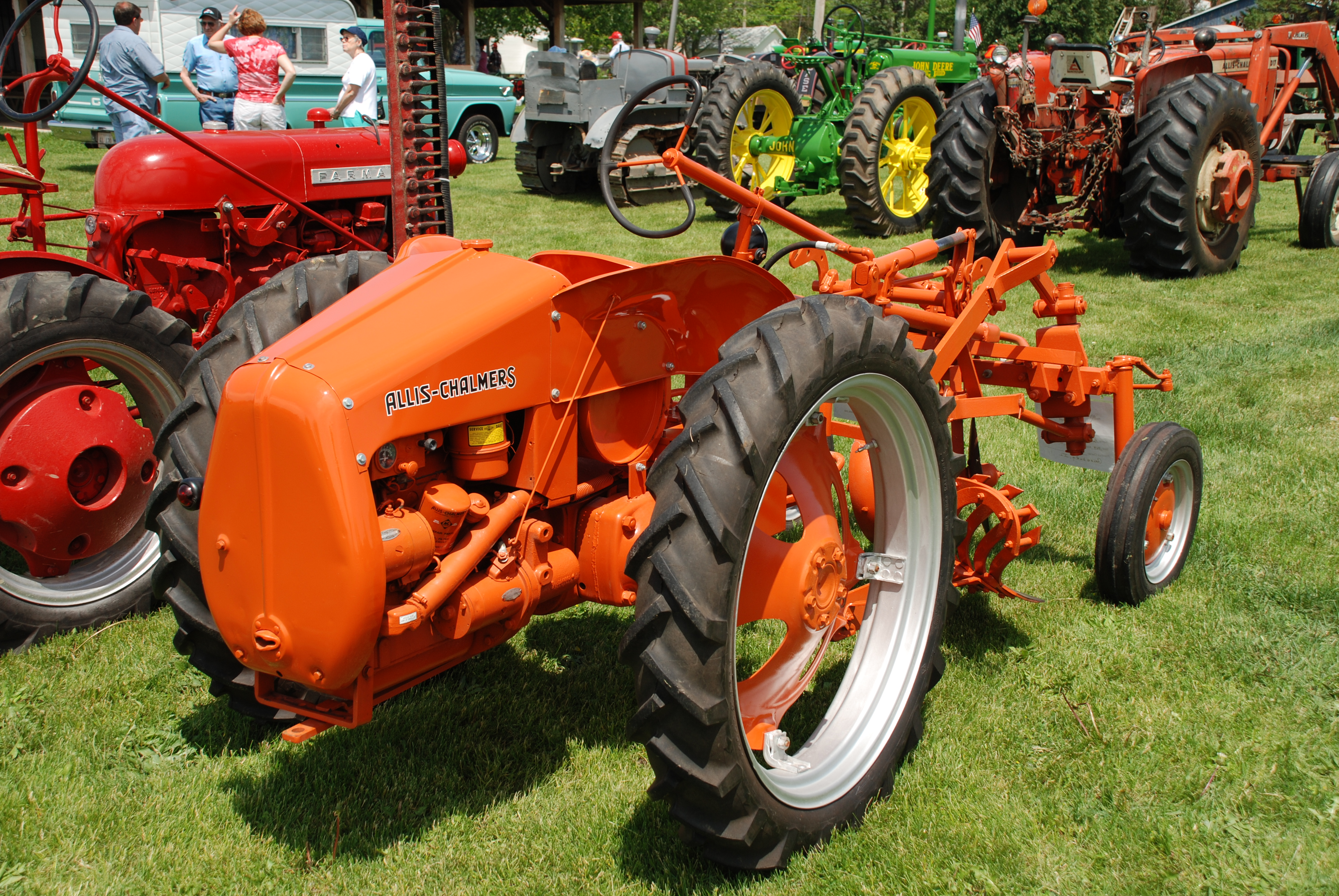
A-C Model G

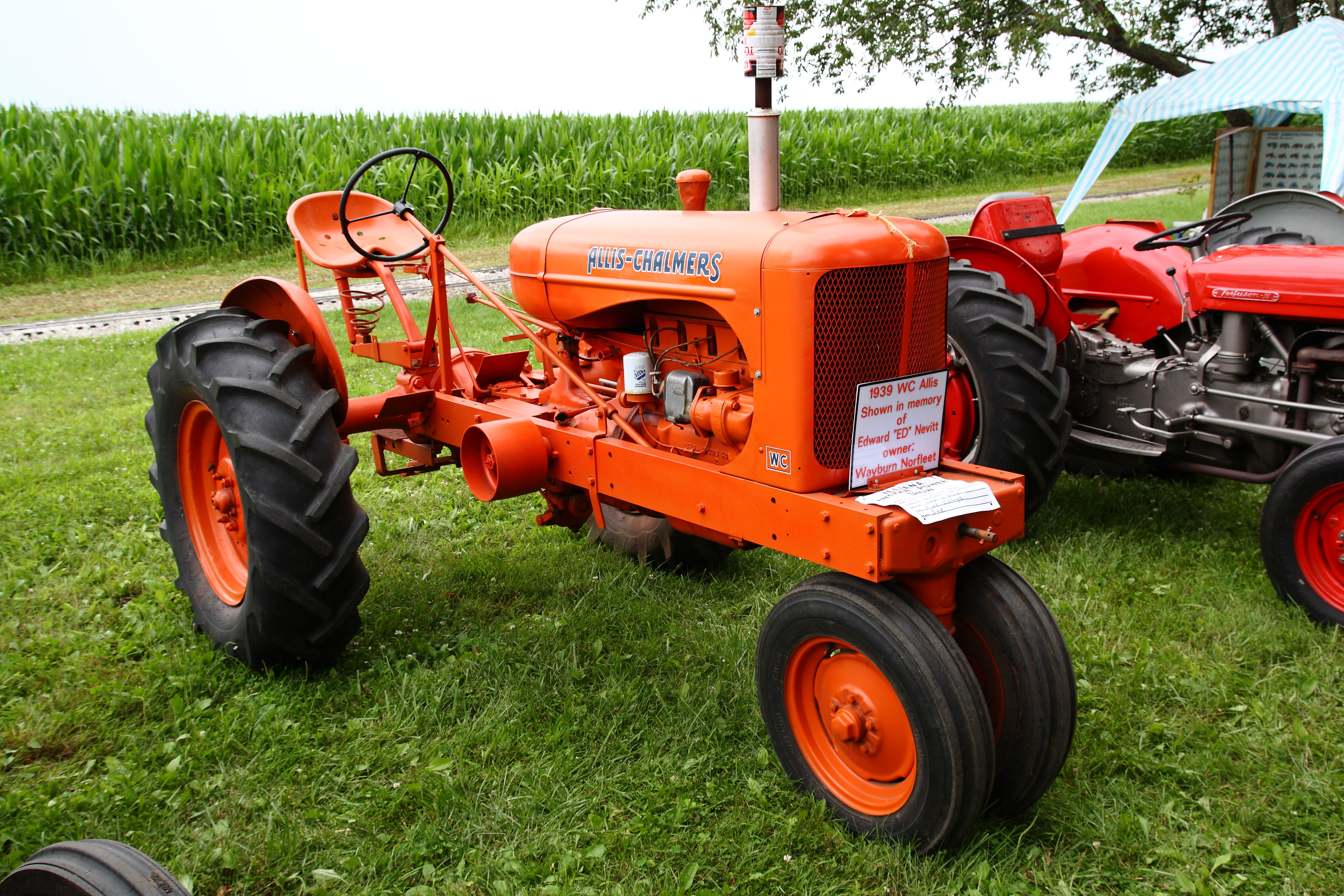
1939 A-C Model WC

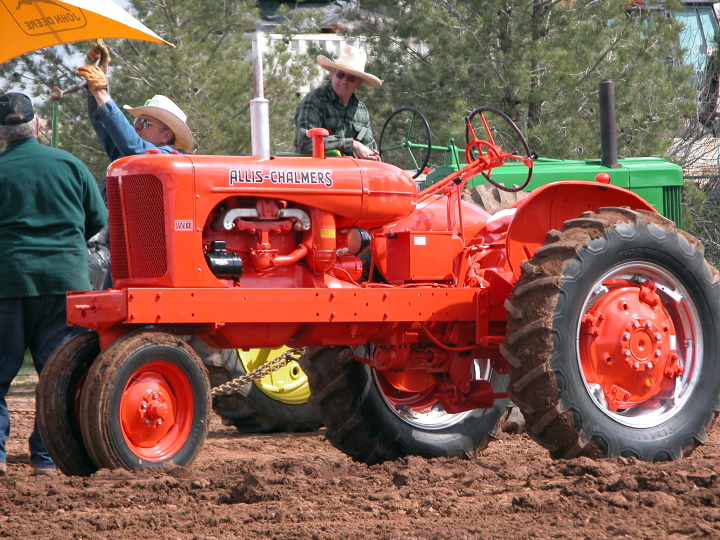
A-C Model WD

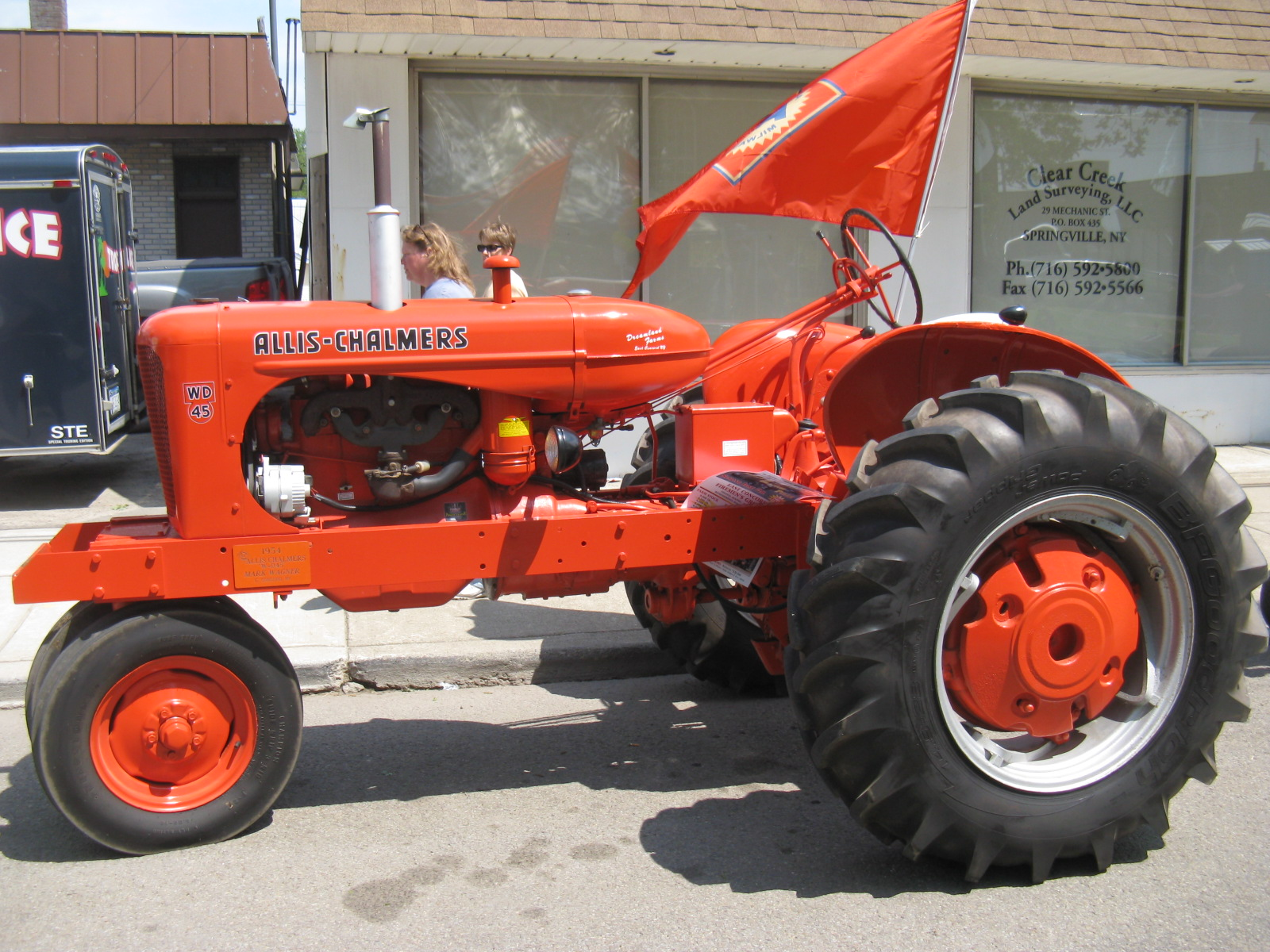
A-C Model WD45

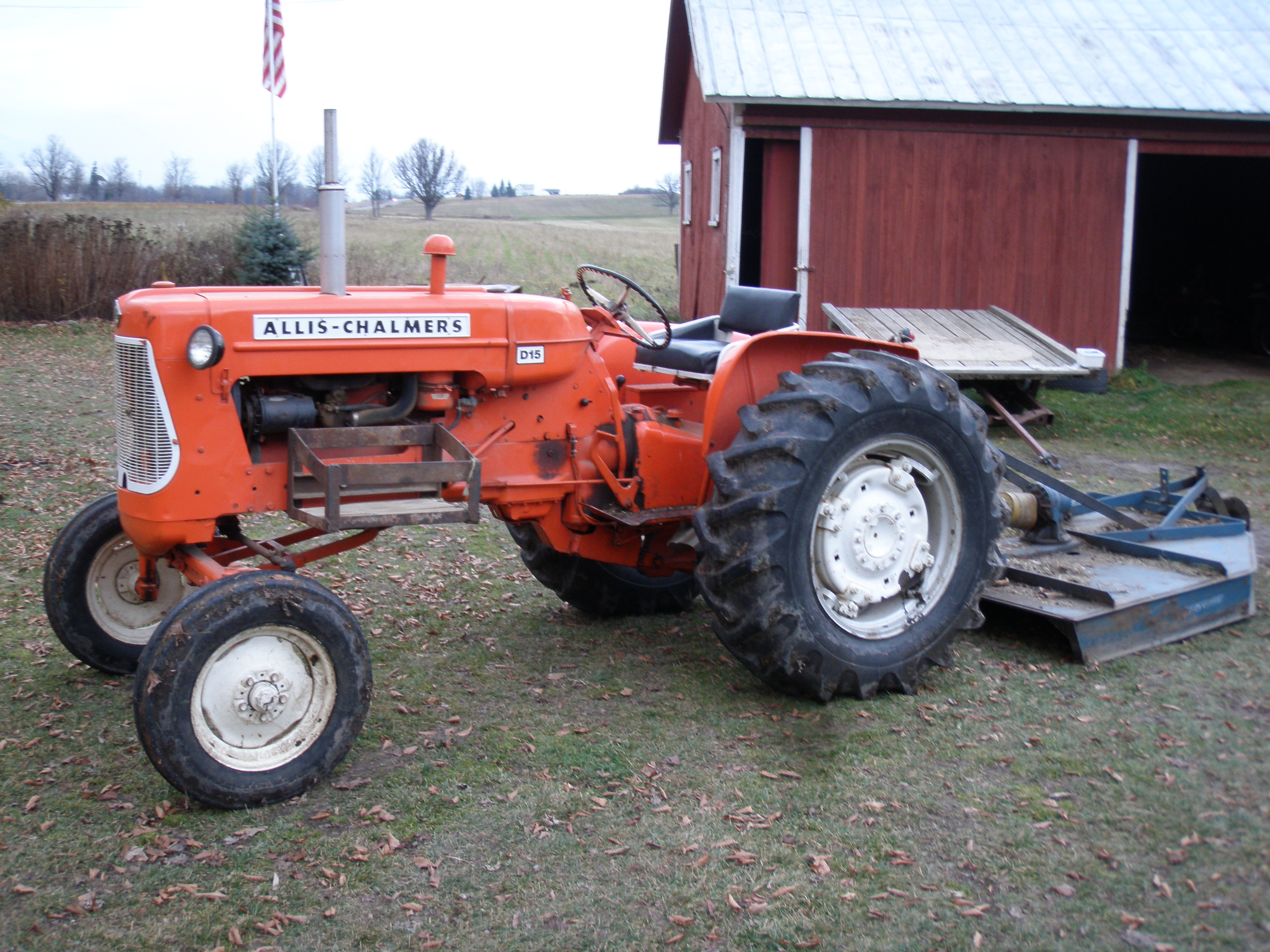
A-C Model D15

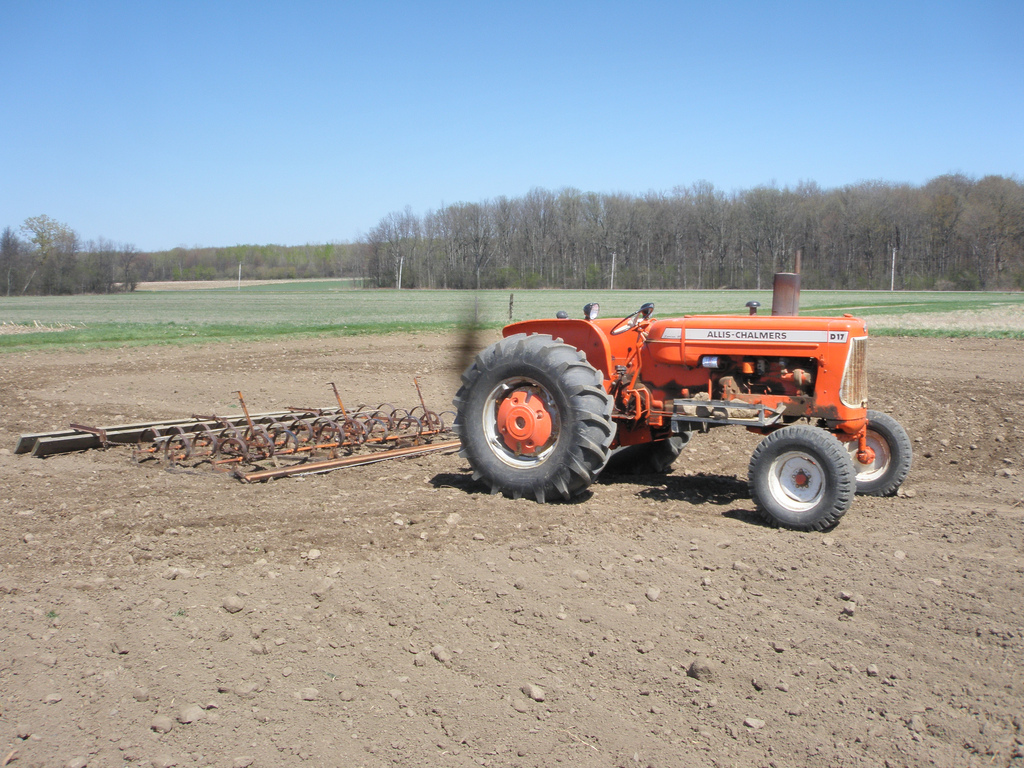
A-C Model D17 pulling a 12' Spring-Tooth Harrow

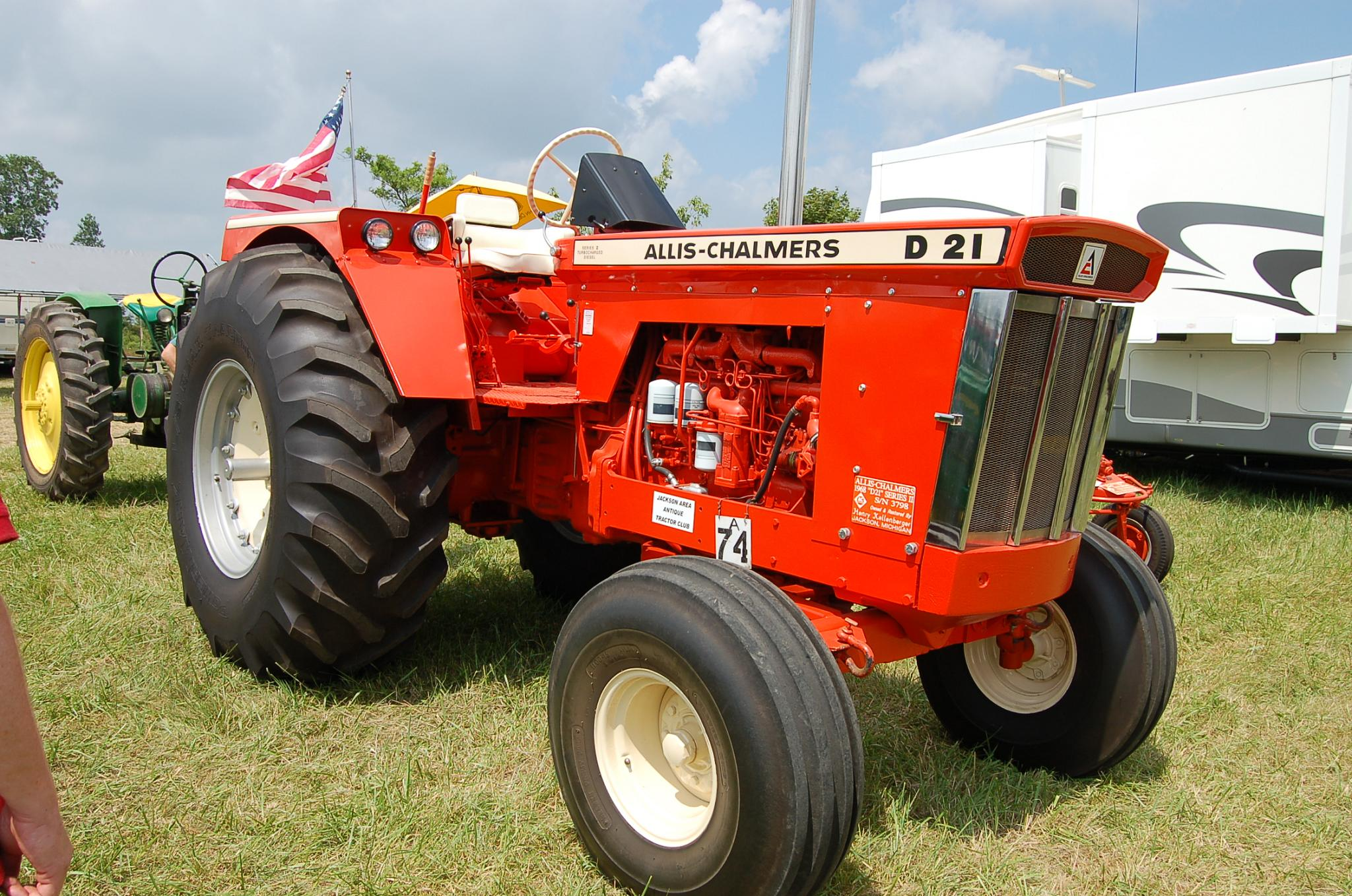
A-C Model D21 Series II

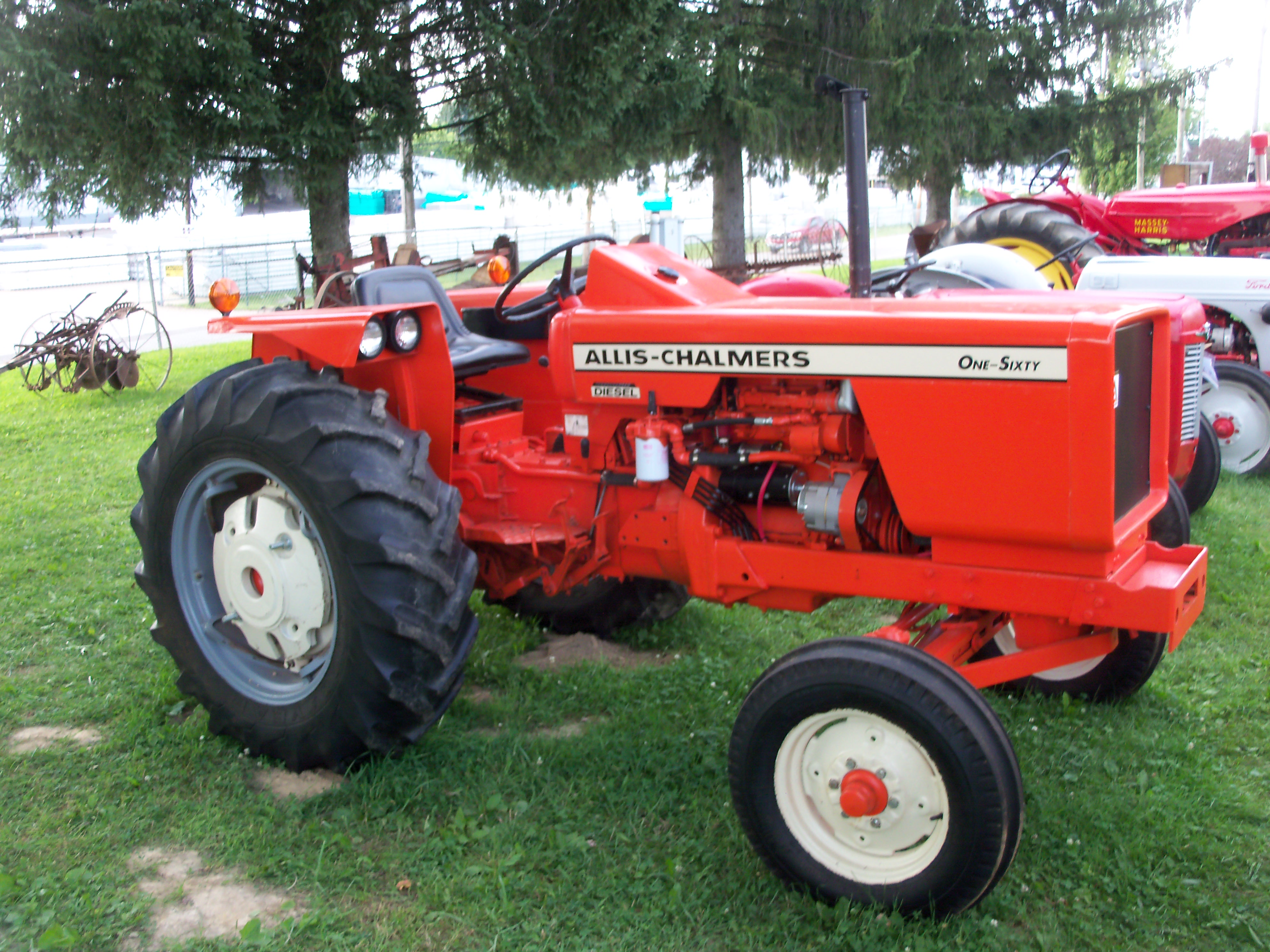
A-C Model 160

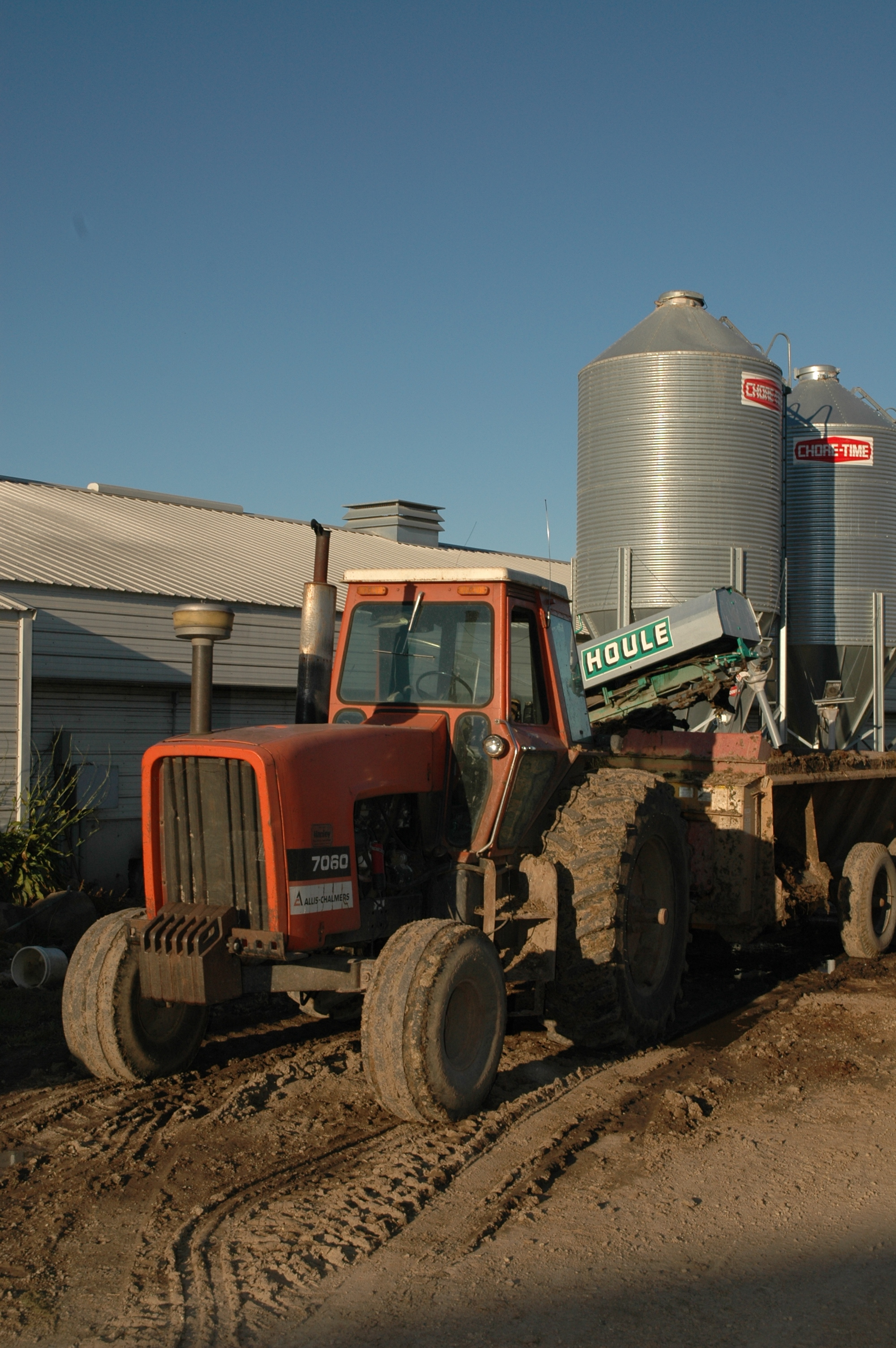
A-C Model 7060 in Wisconsin

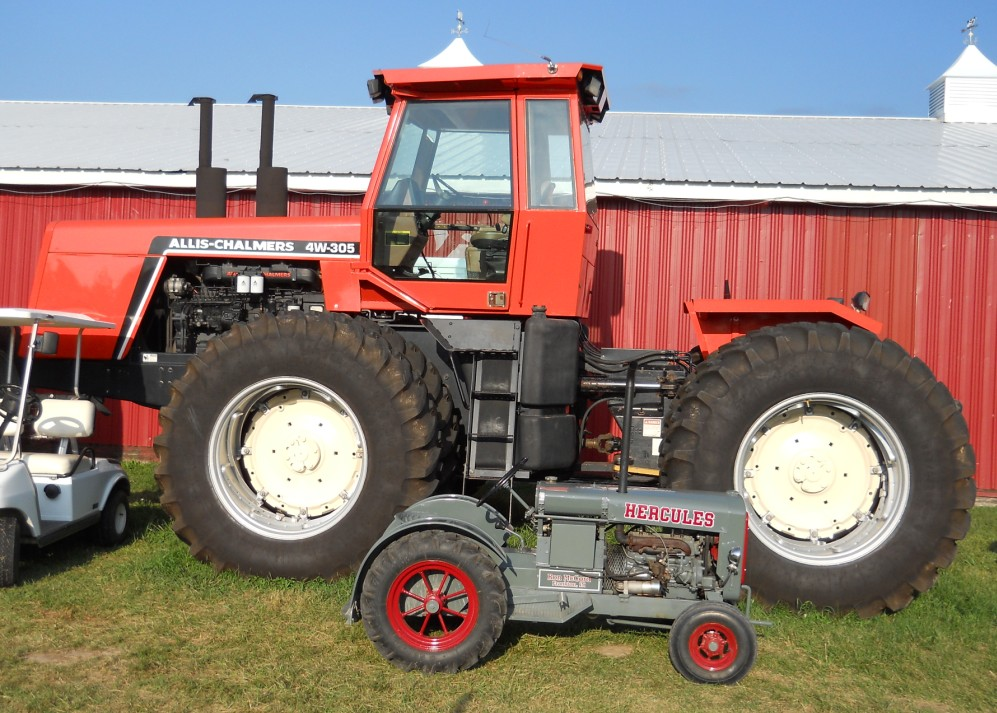
A-C model 4W-305, the most powerful Ag tractor built by the company

=== Balers ===
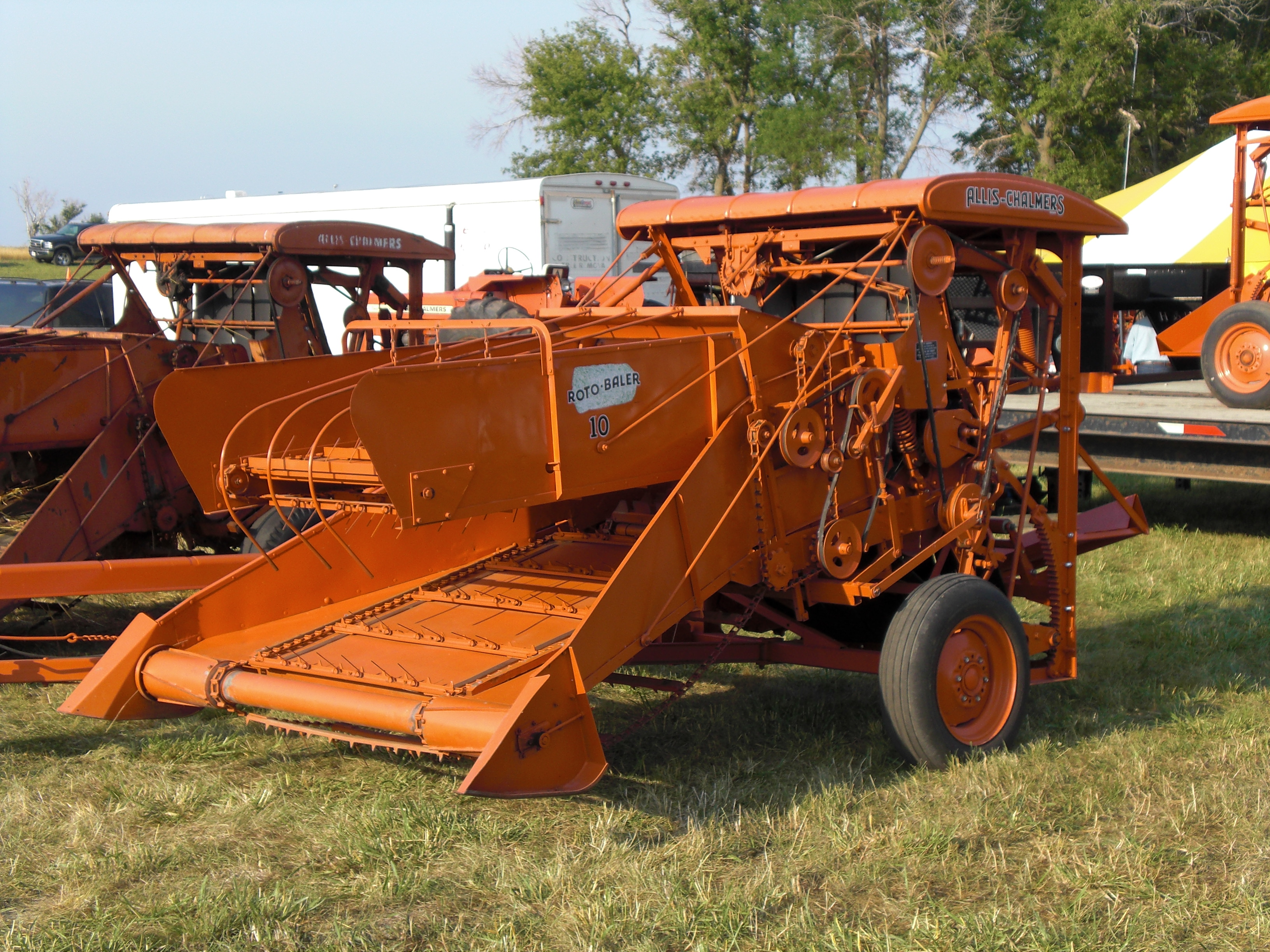
Allis-Chalmers Roto Baler

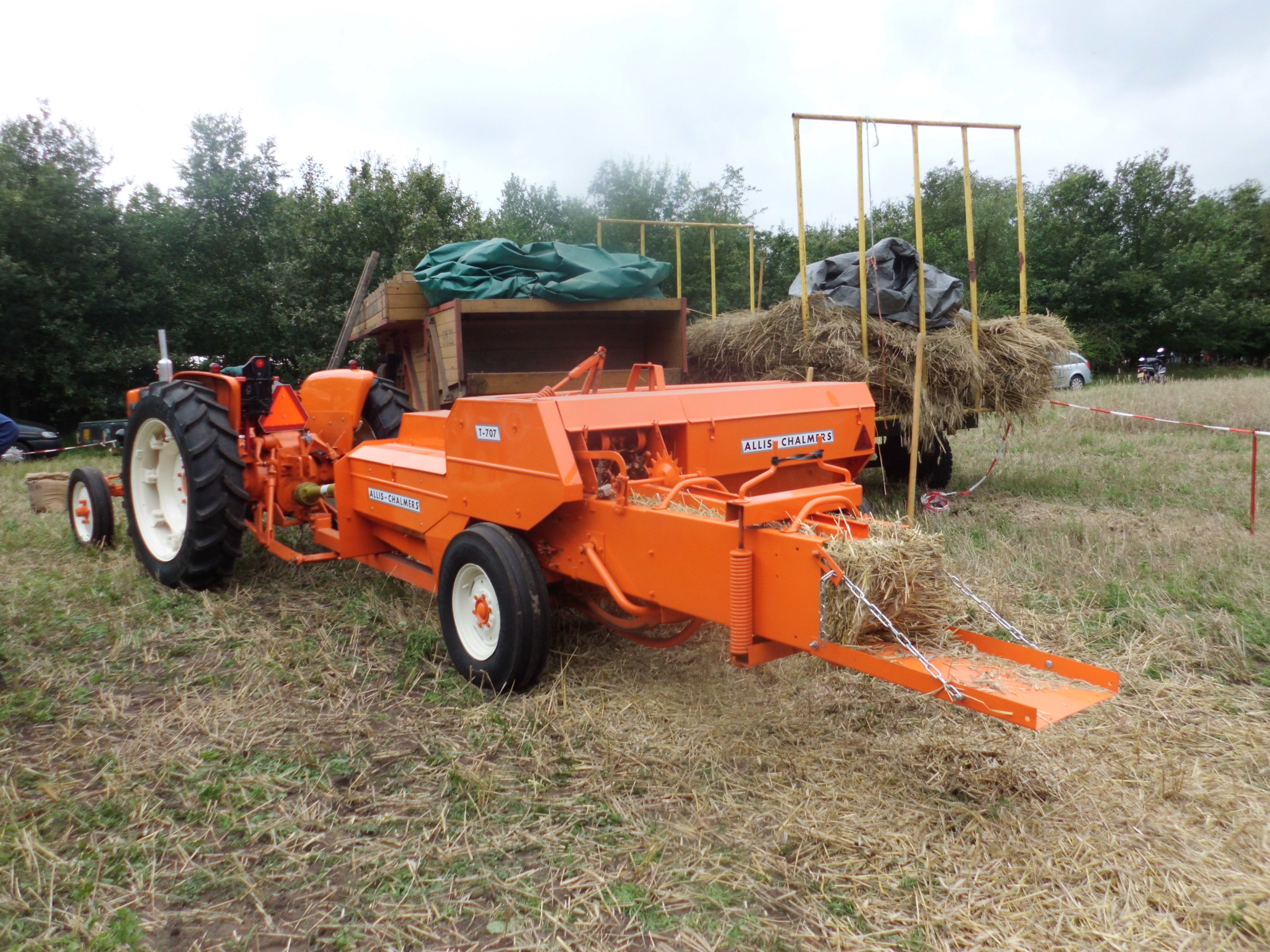
Allis-Chalmers Small Square Baler

The first model introduced in 1947 was called the "Roto-Baler" and the fore-runner of modern round balers, albeit with much smaller bales. The Roto-Baler had a production run from 1947 to 1964 and then again from 1972 to 1974. Allis Chalmers also built many small square baler models.

=== Combine Harvesters ===
Allis-Chalmers originally developed their pull-type "all-crop harvester" as their solution for growers to harvest their crops beginning in 1933. In 1955, Allis-Chalmers acquired the Gleaner Baldwin/Gleaner Manufacturing Company and its line of self-propelled combine harvesters.

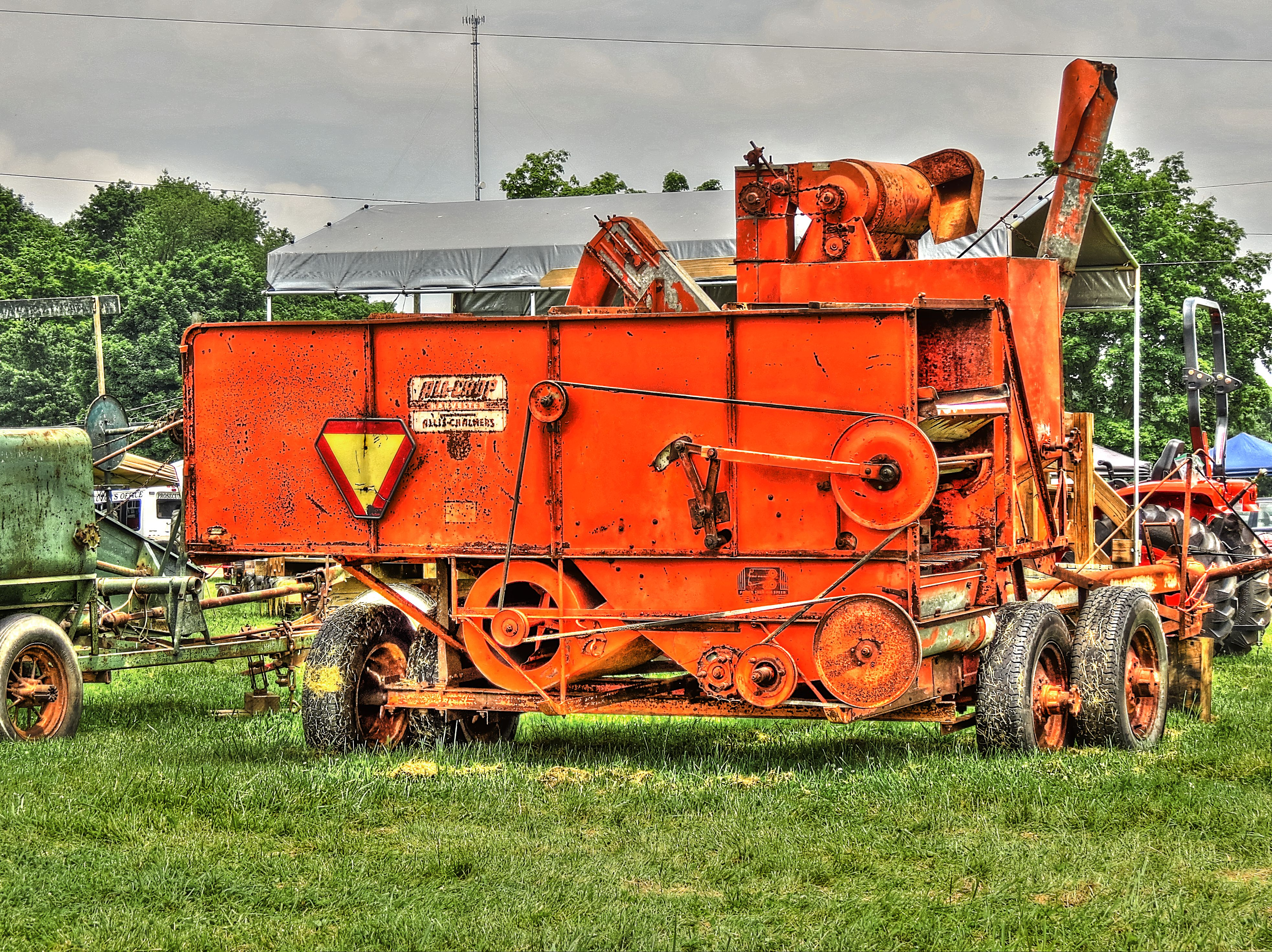
1958 A-C Model "60" All-Crop Harvester

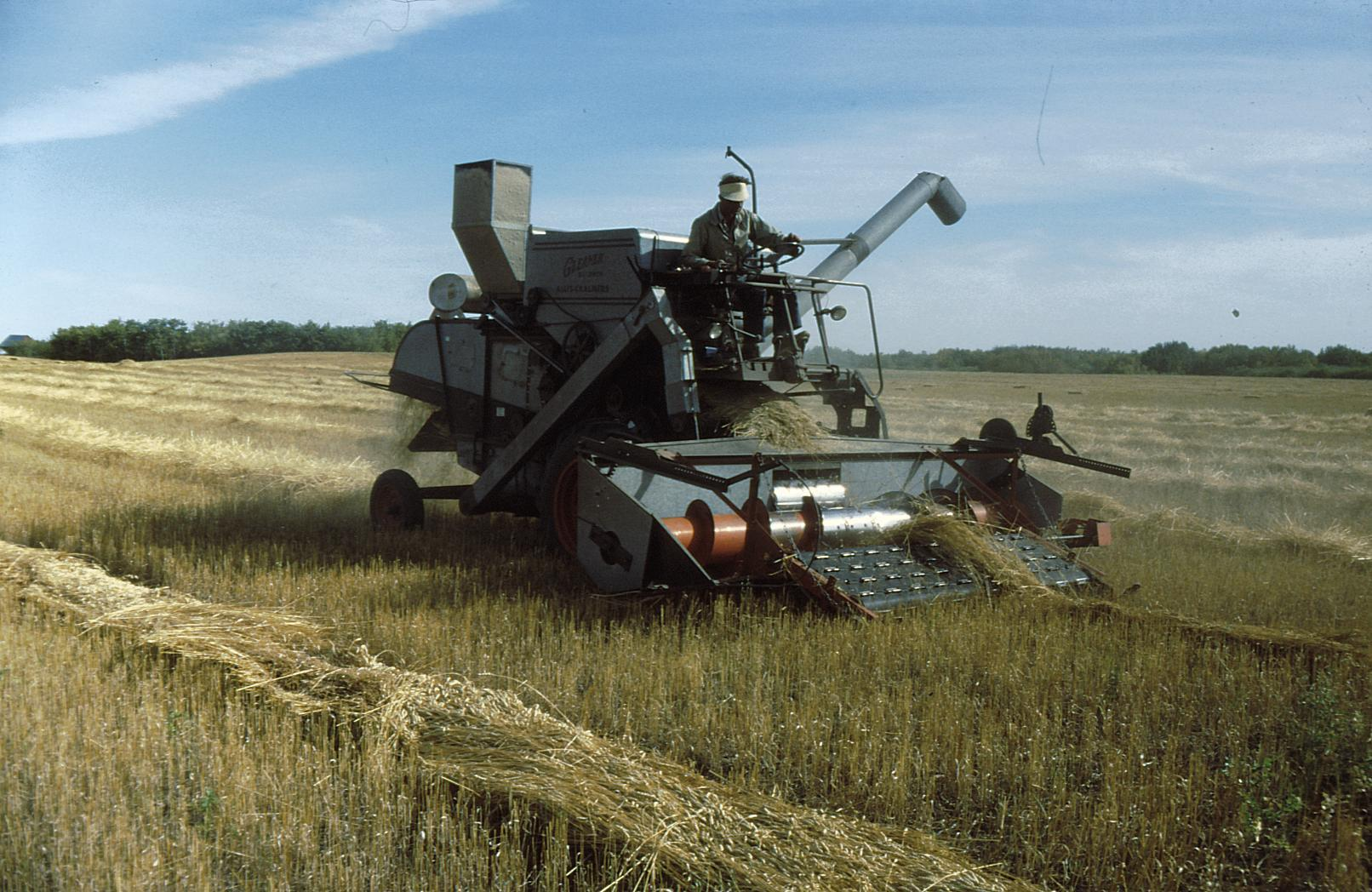
1965 Gleaner Model "E" Combine

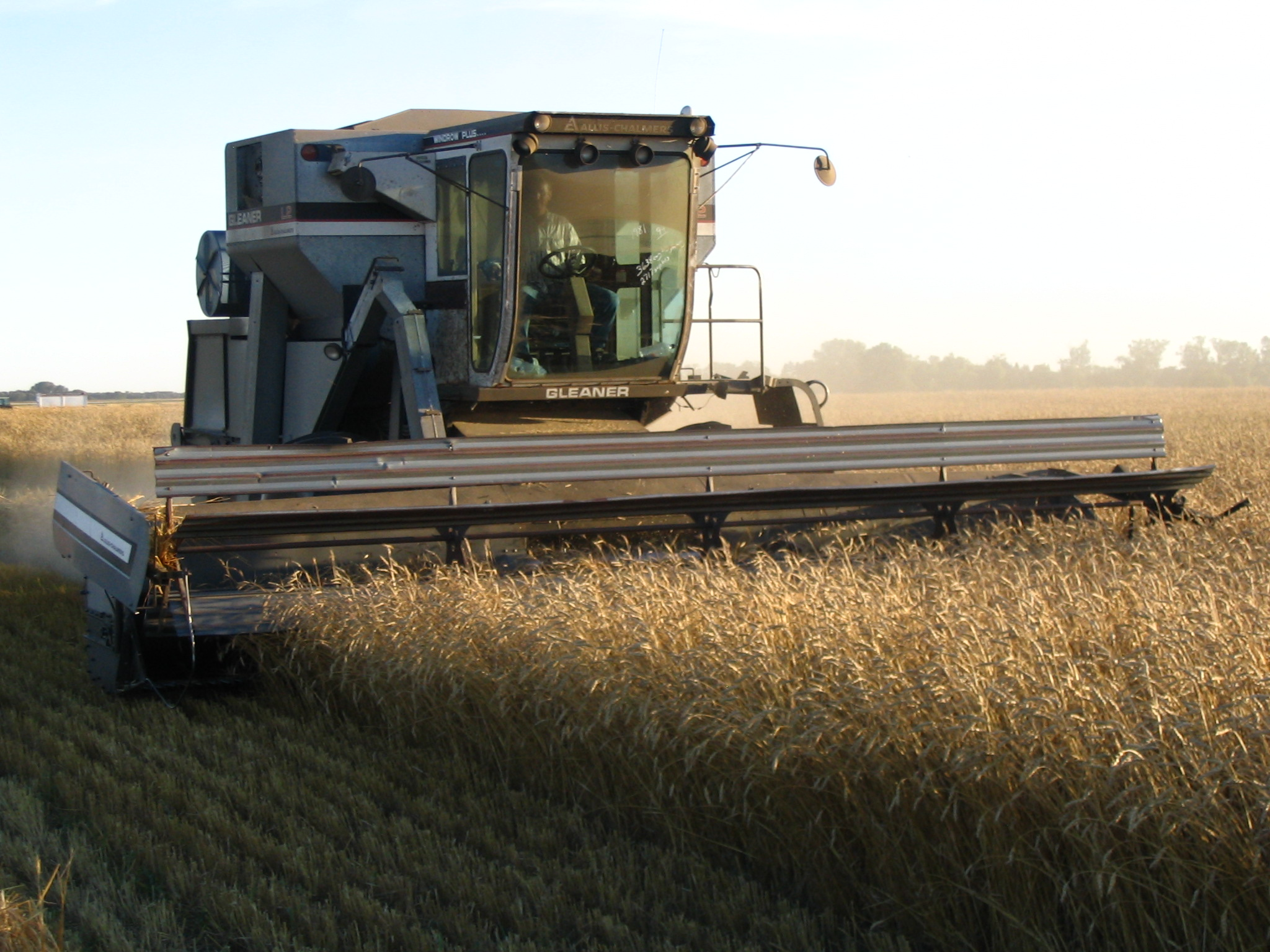
Gleaner Model "L2"

== Industrial construction equipment ==
The company produced several lines of earth-moving and construction equipment, such as road graders, tracked bulldozers and loaders, and forklifts.

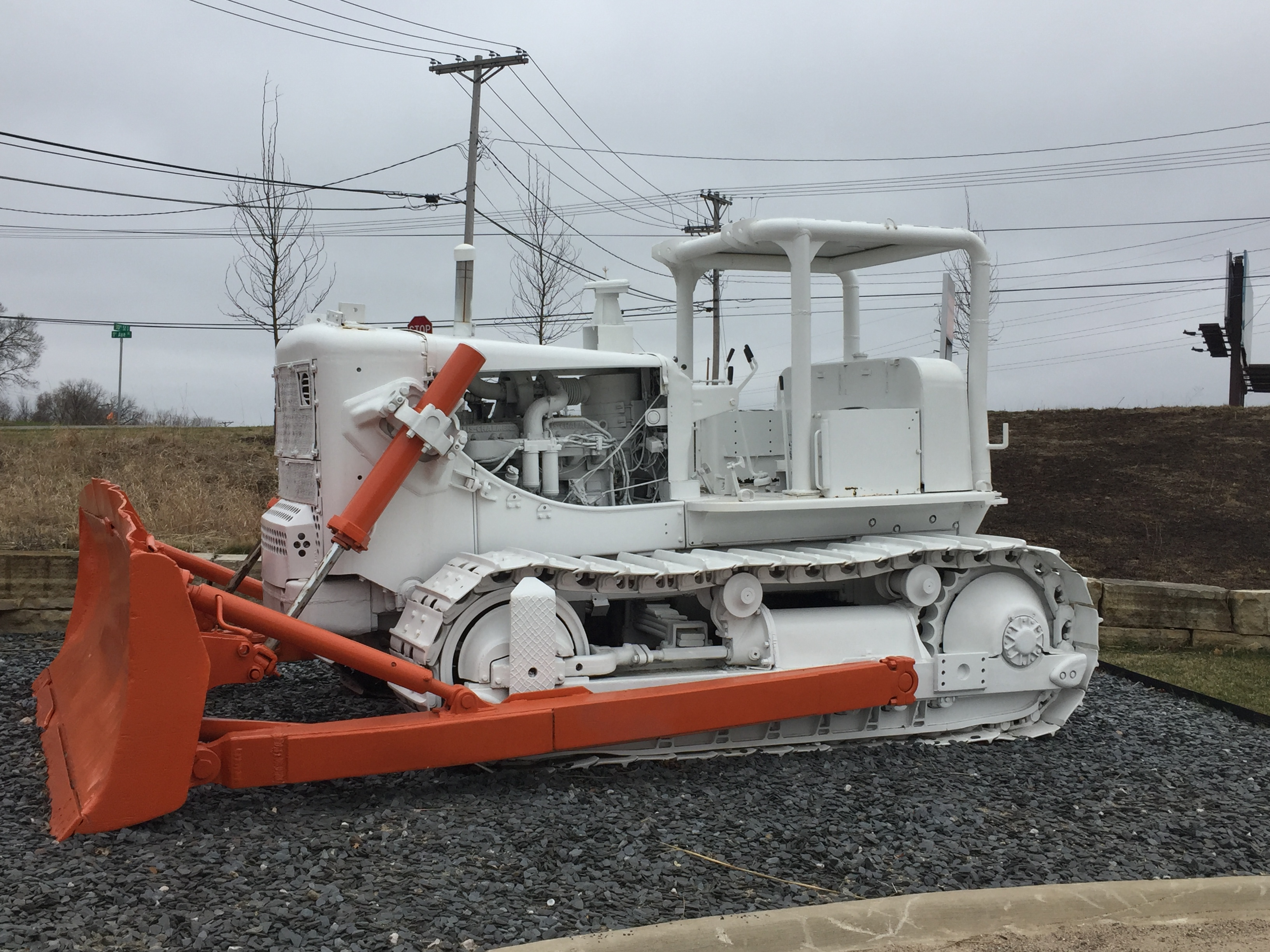
A-C model HD20 with Hydraulic bulldozer blade

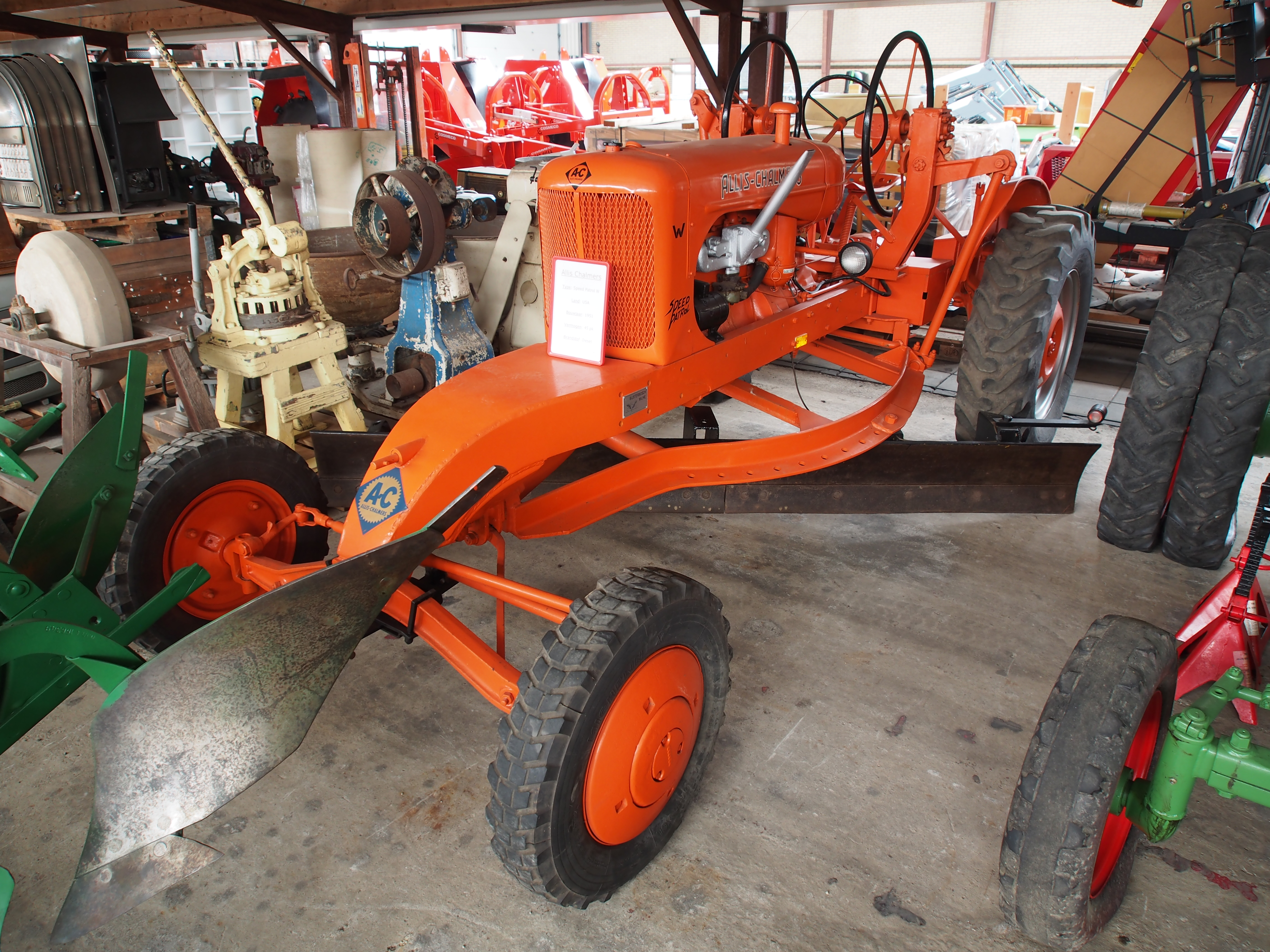
A-C model W road grader

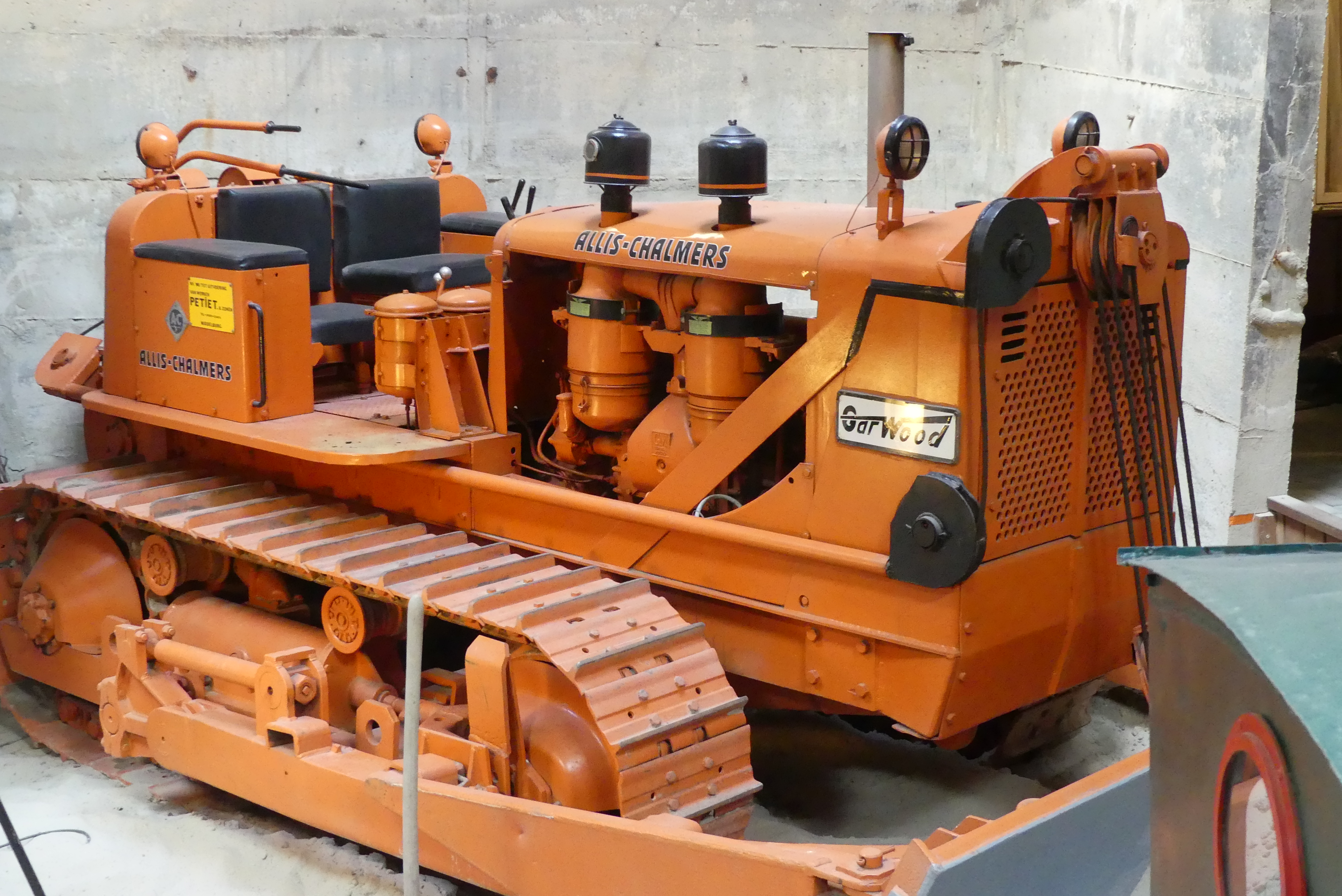
A-C model HD20 crawler tractor with cable-actuated bulldozer blade

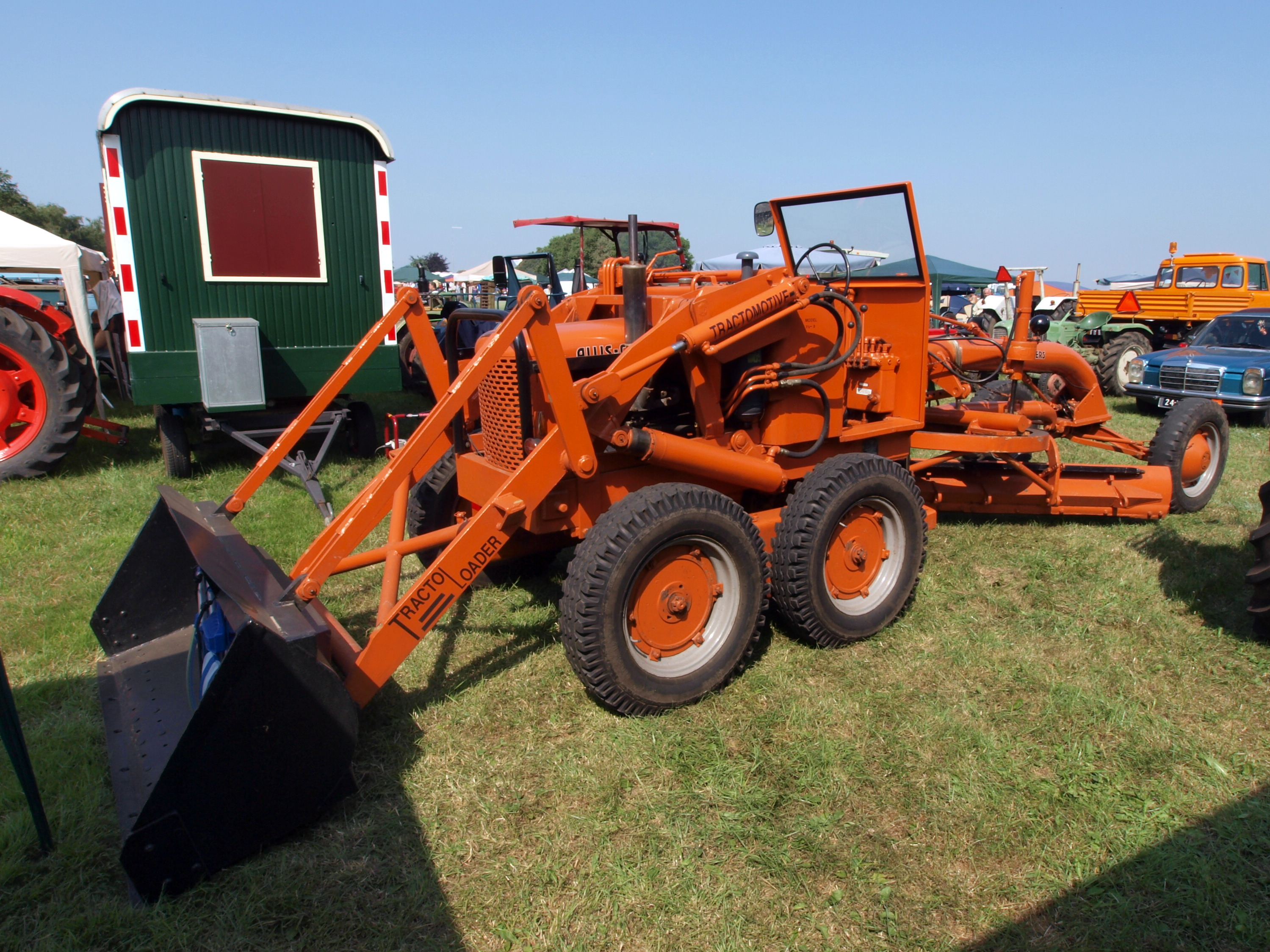
A-C road grader

== Industrial and power house equipment ==
Allis Chalmers marketed a full line of industrial and power house equipment, including turbo generators and medium voltage switchgear. In the 1920s through the 1960s AC Power House and Industrial equipment was competitive with industry giants like General Electric and Westinghouse. As early as the 1920s AC was manufacturing multi MVA hydro-electric generators and turbines, many of which remain in service (Louisville Gas & Electric Ohio Falls units 1–8, 8MW low head turbines and Kentucky Utilities Dix Dam units 1–3, 11MVA 300 RPM generators).

Allis Chalmers manufactured several lines of medium voltage switchgear, such as the HF and MA lines. The HF line competed with the General Electric "AM" Magneblast line of vertical-lift medium-voltage switchgear. The MA line was a competitor of the ITE "HK" line of horizontal-racking medium-voltage switchgear.

Allis-Chalmers produced a line of substation transformers, voltage regulators, and distribution transformers.

Allis Chalmers, during the period 1930–1965 and beyond, manufactured and marketed an extensive line of ore crushing equipment for the mining industry

In 1965, Allis-Chalmers built "Big Allis", or Ravenswood No. 3, the biggest generator in New York. It is located in Queens, has an output of 1000 MW, and remains operational.

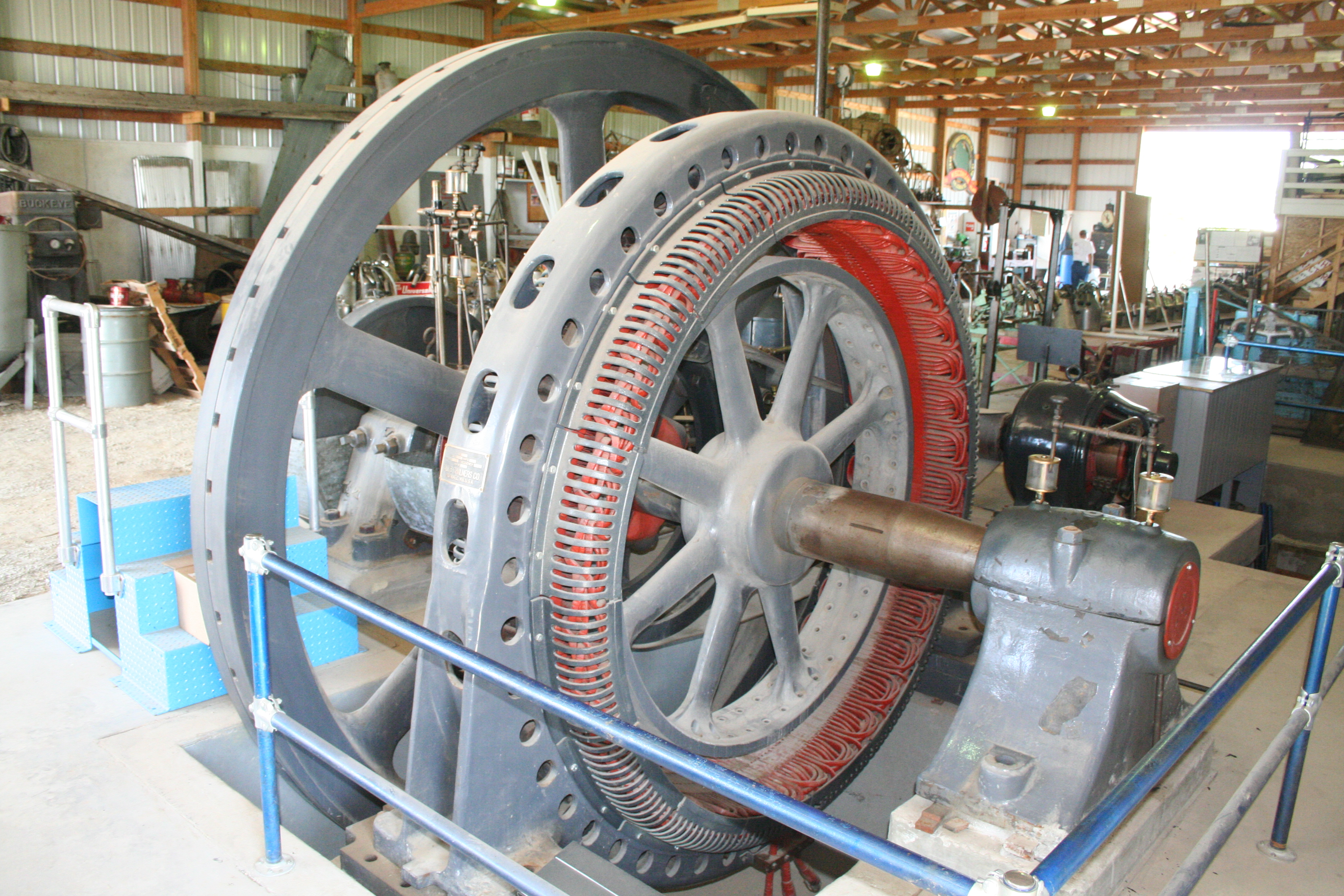
An earlier version of Allis-Chalmers electric generator

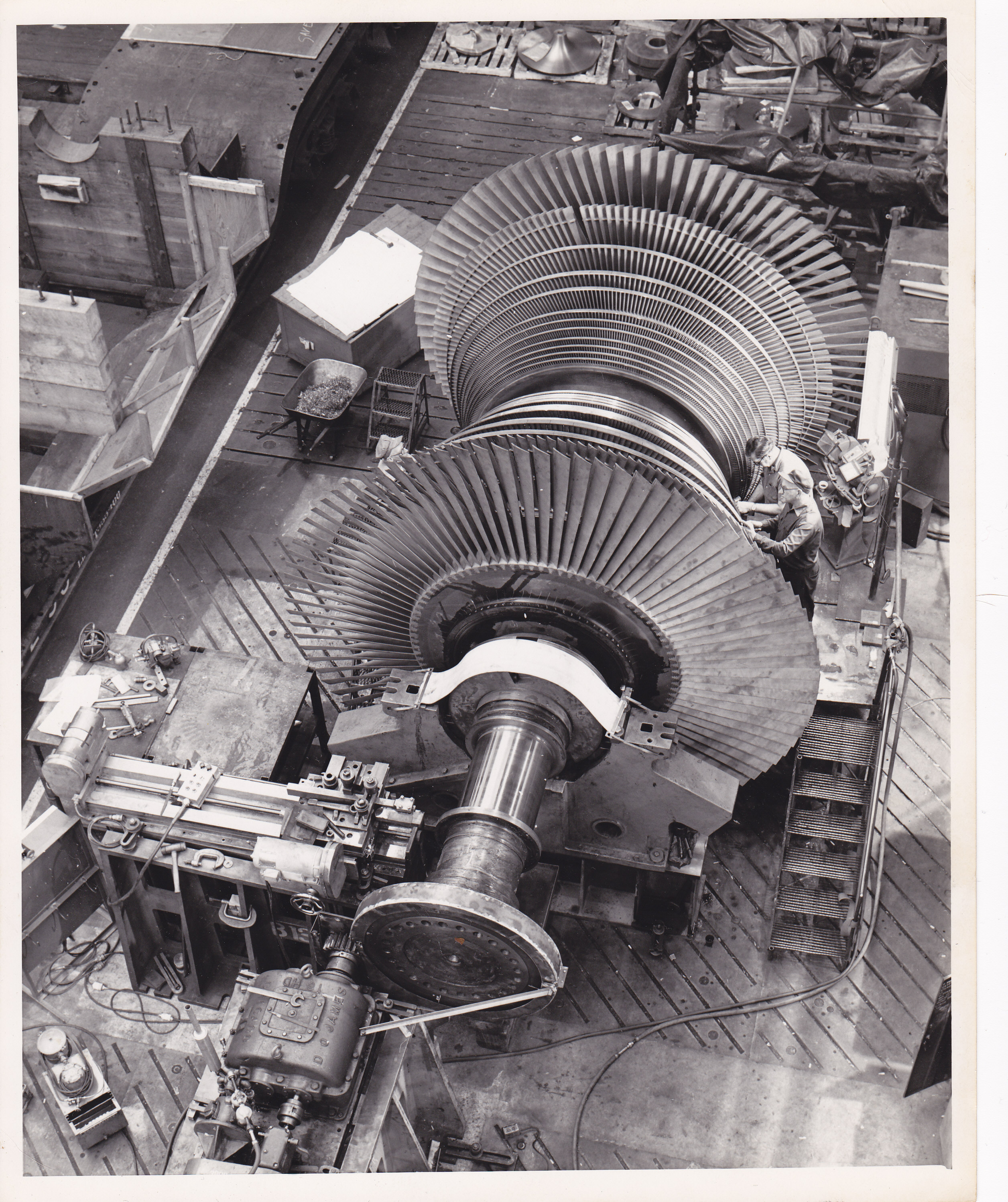
A-C Made Steam Generator Turbines being assembled

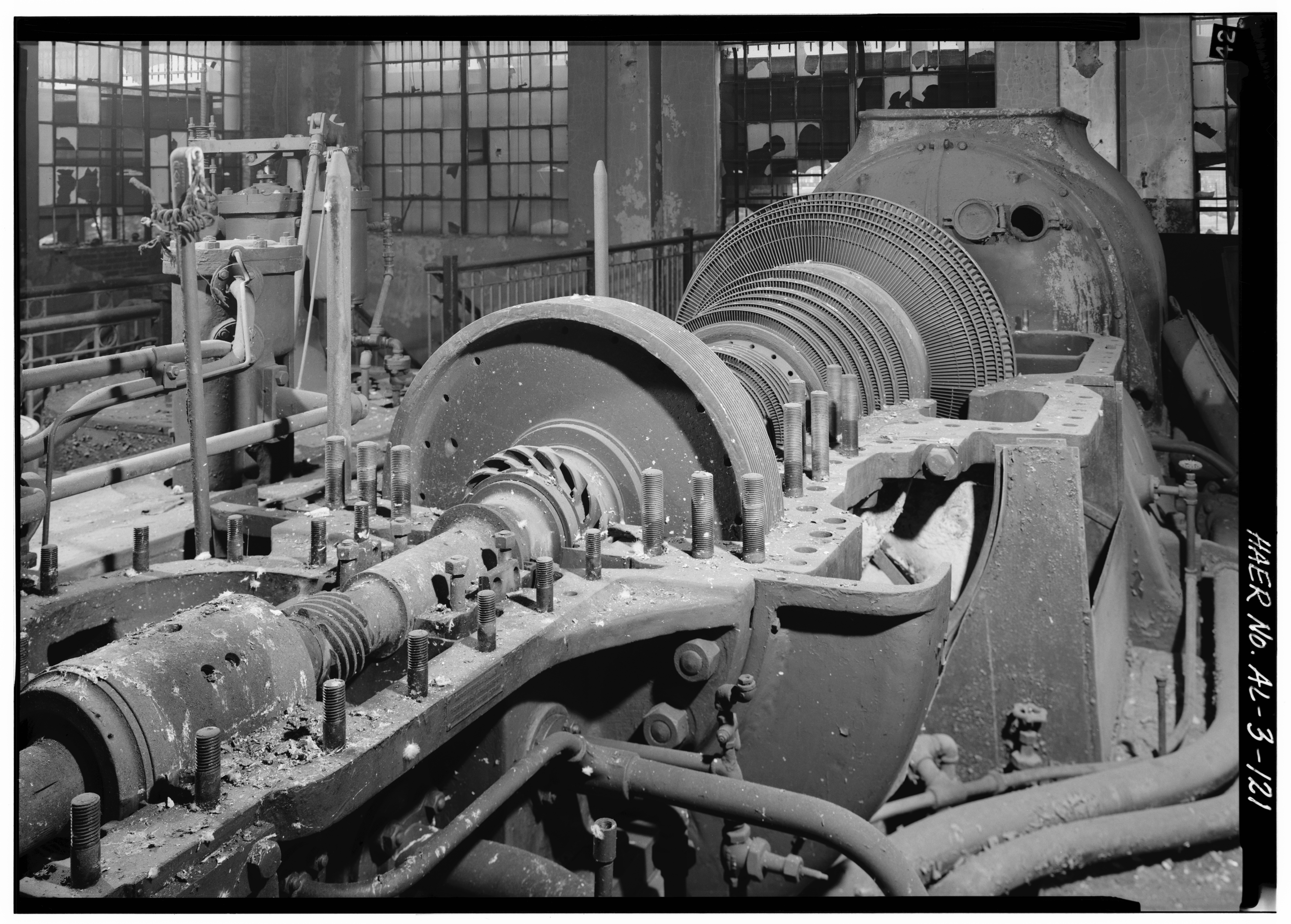
A-C Steam Turbine with engine housing removed, 1929

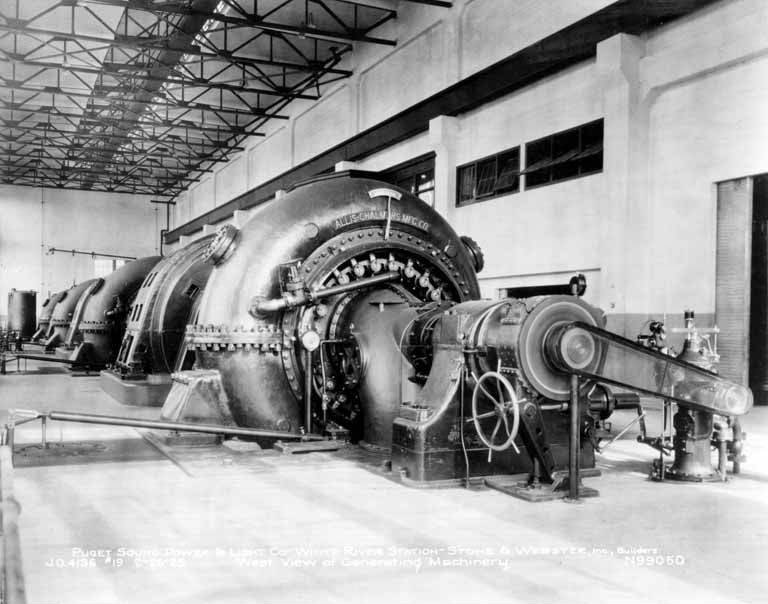
A-C power generator at White River Power Plant, Washington State, 1925

== Lawn and outdoor machinery ==
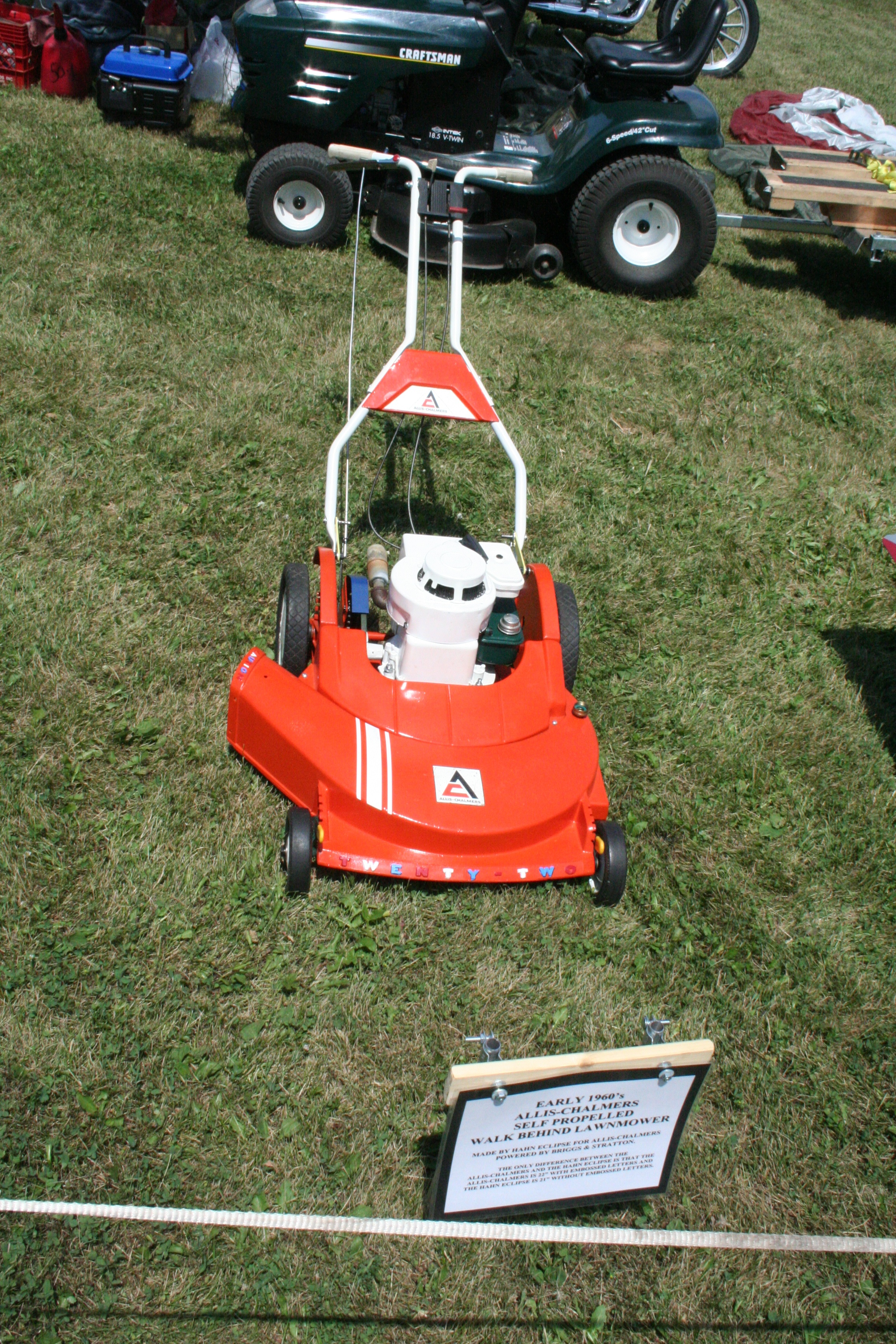
Allis-Chalmers Model SP Lawn Mower

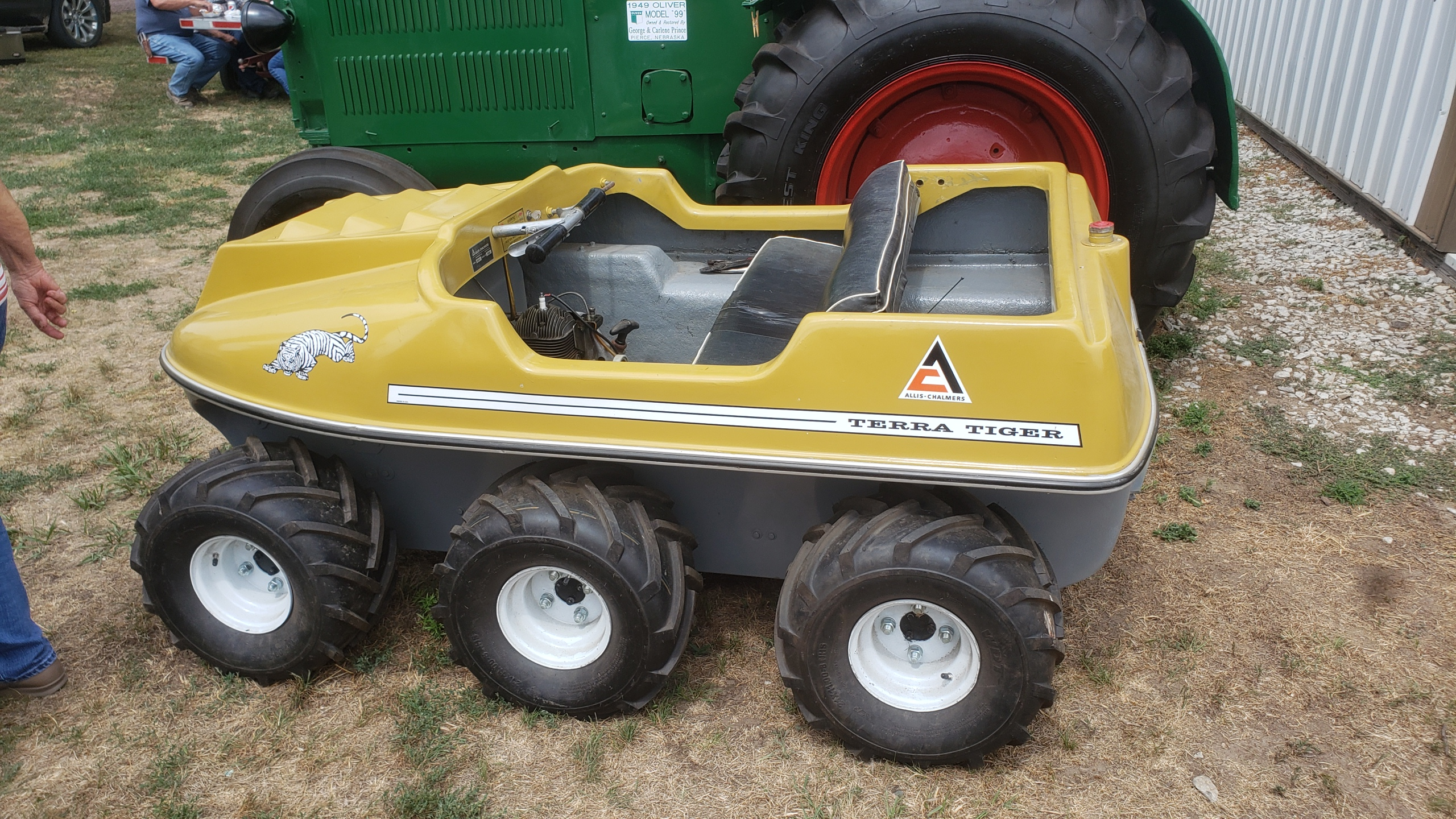
Side view of A-C Terra Tiger

In the late 1960s and early 1970s AC expanded into lawn and out-door equipment.

=== All-terrain vehicles ===
AC made a line of 6-wheeled Amphibious ATV's called the "Terra Tiger".

=== Fuel cell golf carts ===
In 1965, Allis-Chalmers built hydrogen fueled fuel cell golf carts.

== Military machinery ==
- J36 jet engine, licensed version of the de Havilland Goblin, not produced
- M1 tractor medium model HD7W
- M1 tractor heavy model HD10W
- M4 tractor high-speed 18-ton artillery tractor manufactured from 1943
- M6 tractor high-speed 38-ton (artillery tractor)
- M7 snow tractor
- M19 snow trailer, 1-ton
- M50 Ontos – a light anti-tank vehicle, 297 units produced from 1955 to 1957
- Steam turbines, Allis Chalmers built the steam turbines which powered the USS Coontz DLG-9 (Later DDG-40) and some other ships of the same class used by the United States Navy.
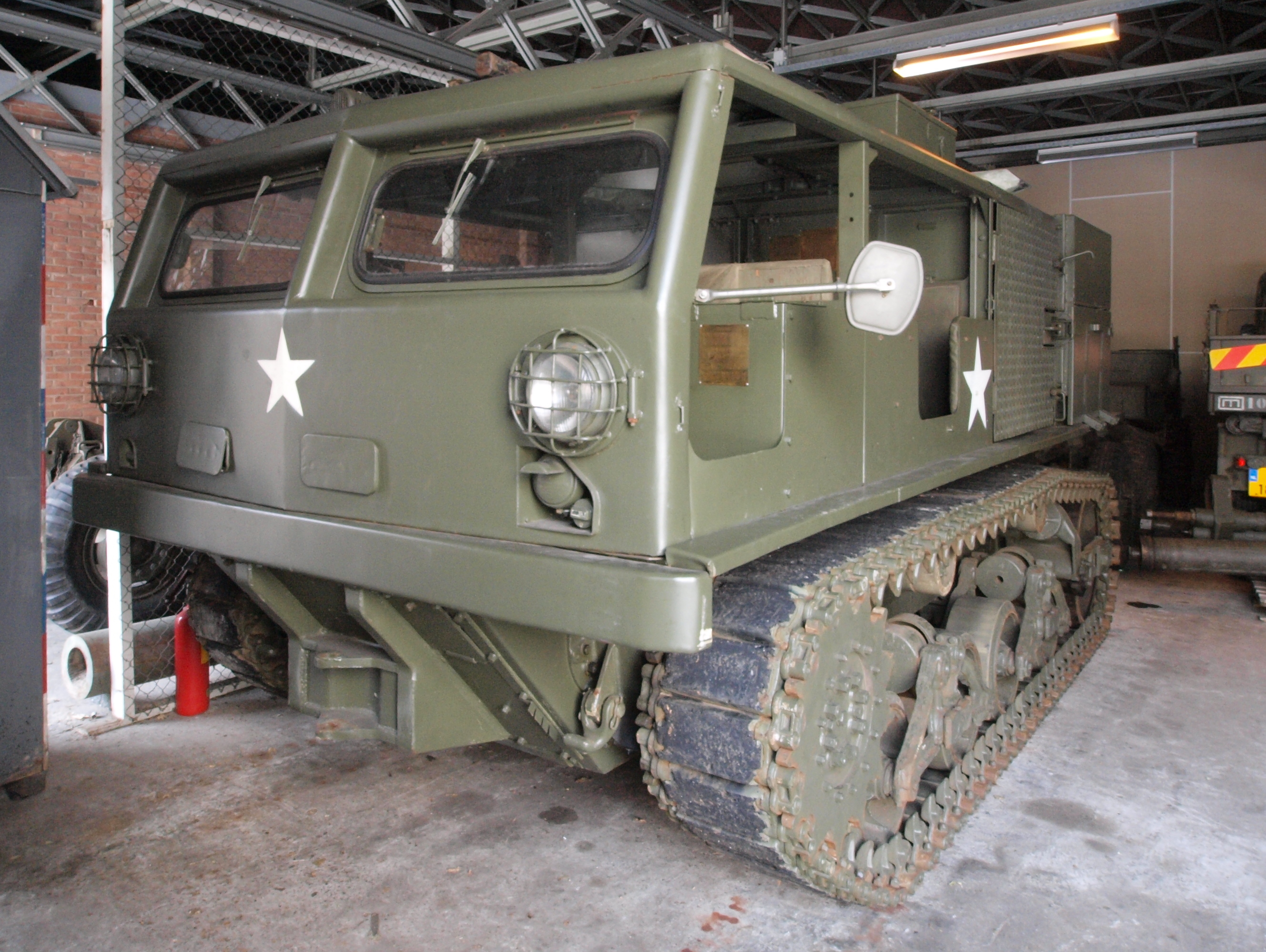
  Allis-Chalmers M4 High Speed
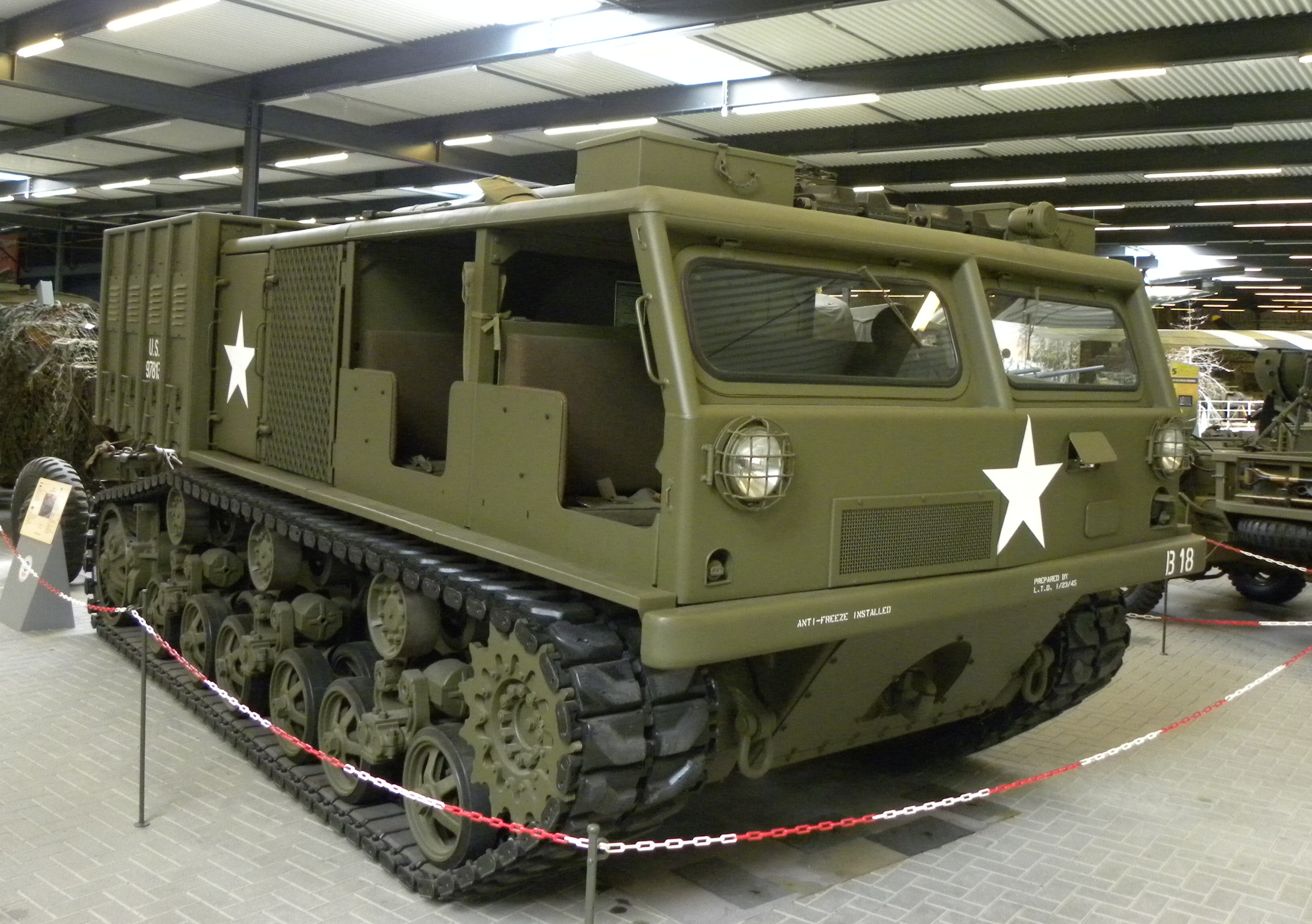
  Allis-Chalmers M6 High-Speed Tractor
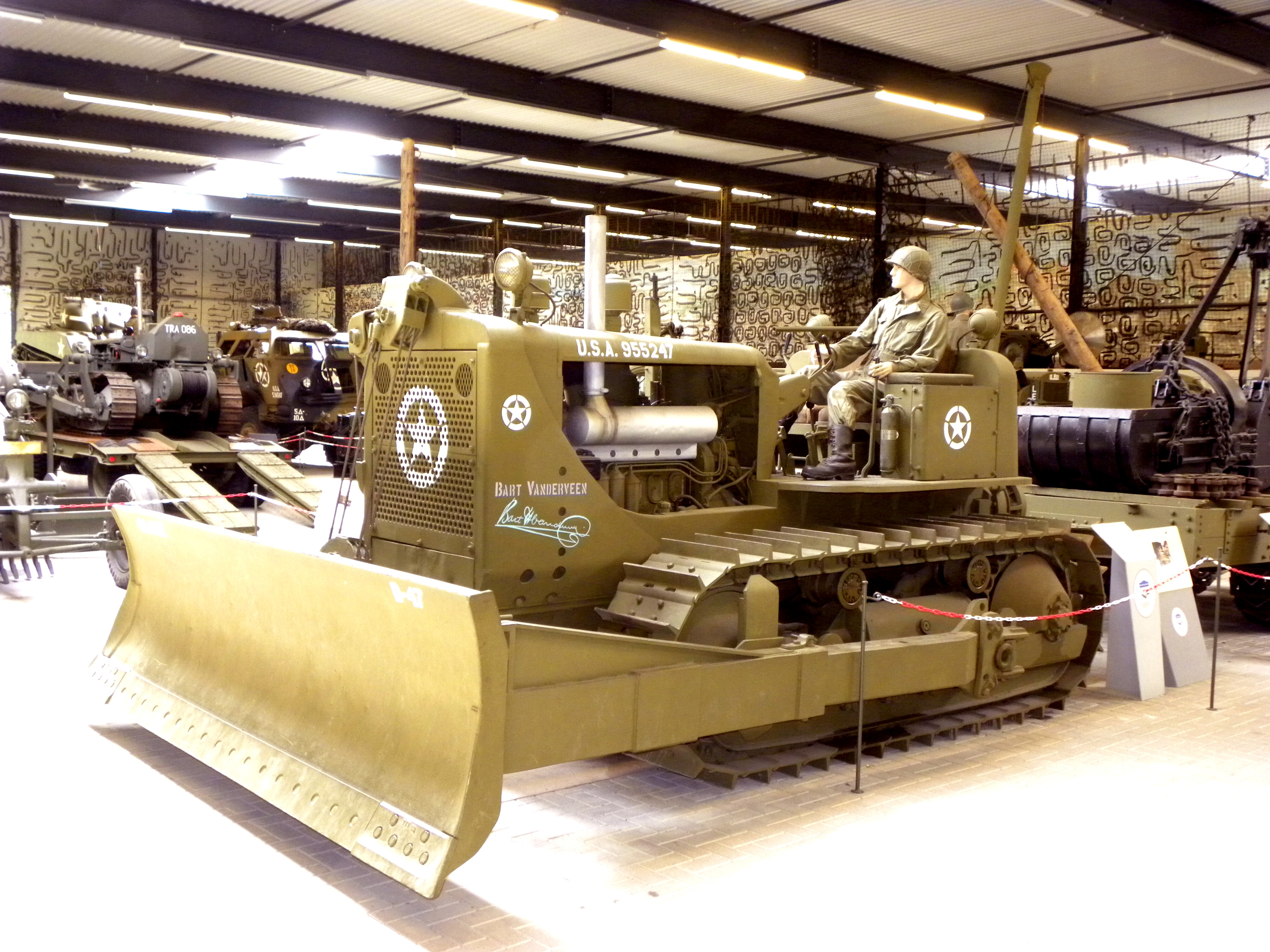
  A-C Model HD-15A Bulldozer

== Allis-Chalmers Energy ==
Allis-Chalmers Energy was a Houston-based multi-faceted oilfield services company. The company provided services and equipment to oil and natural gas exploration and production companies, both domestically and internationally. It became Archer in 2011 after it merged with Seawell, another oil services/energy company.

== See also ==
- List of Allis-Chalmers tractors
- List of Allis-Chalmers engines
- AGCO (holder of former Deutz-Allis assets)
- CNH Global (holder of former FIAT-Allis assets)
- Siemens AG (holder of former Siemens-Allis assets)
- Timeline of hydrogen technologies
- Allis-Chalmers J36
