= Cold Metal =

Cold Metal may refer to:

- Cold metal cutting saw
- "Cold Metal", song from Instinct (Iggy Pop album) 1988
- "Cold Metal", song by Ambeon, Arjen Anthony Lucassen from Fate of a Dreamer 2001
