= Cut off saw =

The terms cut off saw, cutoff saw, or chop saw can refer to two distinct classes of power tools.

- A miter saw, typically used in woodworking
- An abrasive saw, typically used to cut hard materials, such as metals or ceramics
