= Diamond disc cutter =

Power tool used to cut hard materials

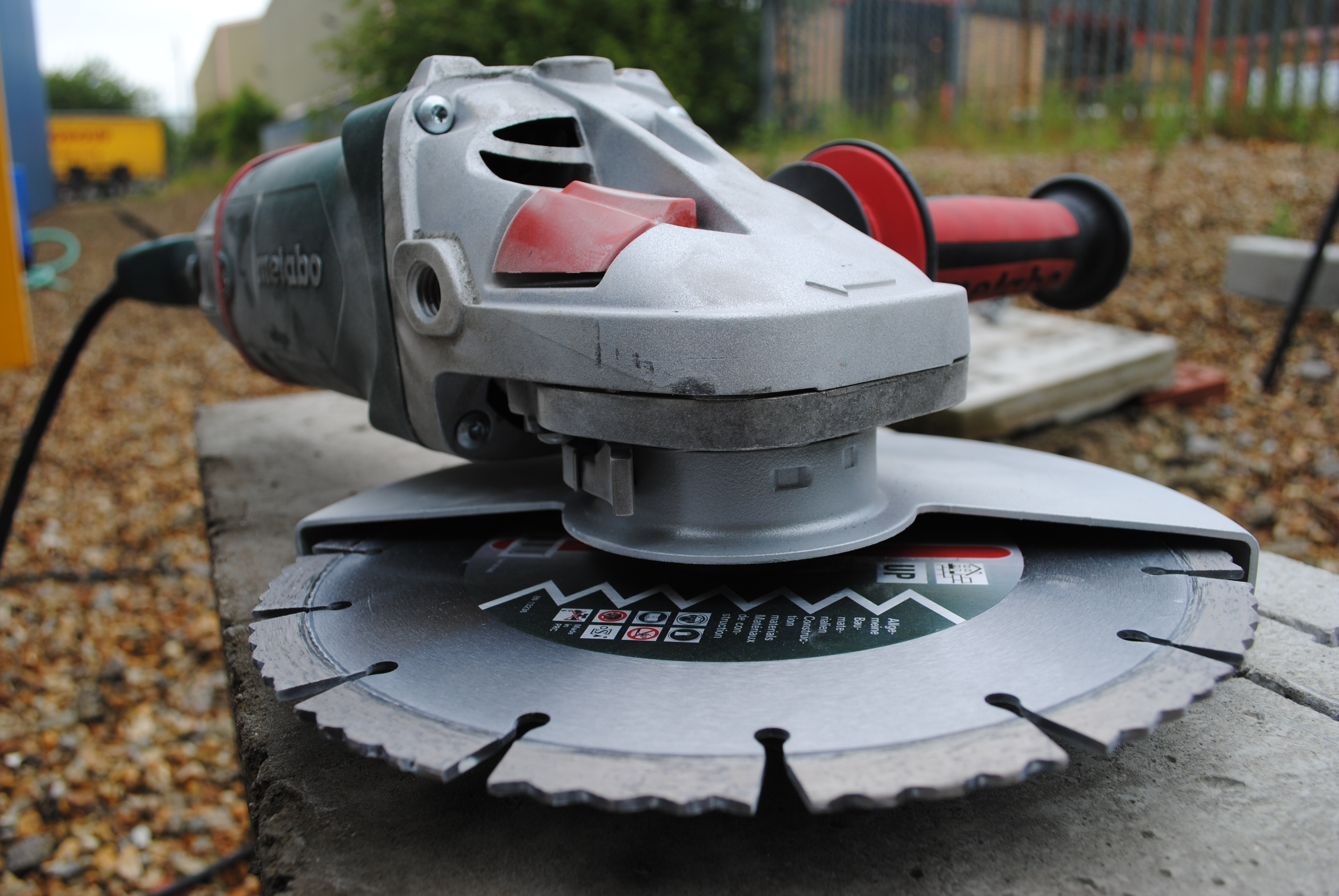
Disc cutter

A disc cutter (also known as a power cutter or a concrete saw) is a specialised, often hand-held, power tool used for cutting hard materials, such as ceramic tile, metal, concrete, and stone. This tool is similar to an angle grinder, chop saw, or die grinder, with the main difference being the cutting disc itself (a circular diamond blade, or resin-bonded abrasive cutting wheel for a disc cutter vs. an abrasive grinding wheel for an angle grinder). This tool is highly efficient at cutting very hard materials, especially when compared to hand tools.

== Discs ==
Often cutting discs, also known as cut-off wheels, are made from a solid abrasive disc. These discs are often used for cutting metal; they are composed of an abrasive mix of grit and adhesive that is formed into a thin, rigid disc with fiber webbing running through it for strength. Some discs used for cutting ceramic tile or stone are made from a solid disc with an edge coated with diamond grit. The most common size for these cutting wheels is 4 1/2 inches in diameter; however they can range from 2 to 16 inches in diameter with a thickness range from .045 in. to .125 in. Type 1 discs are flat, and type 27 discs have a raised hub. These wheels are strong but are not immune to breaking. If a cutting wheel breaks while in use, fragments could injure the operator or nearby co-workers. To avoid breaking cutting discs, never exceed the maximum speed (RPM) specified on the disc, and do not overload the disc by cutting with excess force or jamming the wheel into your workpiece.

== Applications ==
Many manual cutting tasks require a hand-held grinder using a cutting wheel. Metal fabrication is one of the most common uses for cutting wheels. Cutting sheet metal, sizing metal stock for welding, cutting a weld to re-weld it, and cutting and notching steel pipe are just a few examples. Die grinders and chop saws are other common tools used with cutting discs.

Smaller projects and smaller or more precise cuts may require a die grinder equipped with a cutting wheel. These cutting wheels or discs are extremely thin and often less than 2 inches in diameter. Because they are so thin, they are commonly made of metal and have a diamond-coated edge as the abrasive. This type of disc cutter is good for sheet metal and for lightweight or thin materials. Thicker or heavier materials will need a larger disc cutter.

For long straight cuts on sheet metal or for light cut-off work, a standard circular saw is used with a 7 1/4-inch cutting wheel. These cutting discs are made just like the smaller wheels of an angle grinder, with resin bonded abrasive material, or are of metal with a diamond-coated edge.

A cutoff saw is used for cutting larger items, like heavy metal stock, metal studs, and for cutting large metal pipe. The cutting discs for this tool are usually 10 or 12 inches in diameter, with a composition like that of the smaller wheels mentioned above. When cutting heavy materials the cutting discs may require lubrication or coolant to prevent overheating. The cutoff saw is for making clean straight 90 degree cuts through the material.

== Citations ==
- "Metal Cutting Disc". homeguides.sfgate.com.
- "Grinding and cutting safely". www.thefabricator.com.
- "Cutting metal with cutting wheels". www.thefabricator.com.
