= Carbide saw =

Type of machine tool

Carbide saws are machine tools for cutting. The saw teeth are made of cemented carbide, so that hard materials can be cut.

== History ==
In 1926, Krupp, a German company, developed carbide, a very hard mixture of sintered carbides of various heavy metals, especially tungsten carbide, used for cutting edges and dies. This new material revolutionized metal-removal or “chip-cutting” in manufacturing. In the 1950s, carbide was used in all machining processes except for sawing. In 1942, German scientists further developed carbide into cermet. After World War II, American universities developed this material further and began to market it as a cutting material for machine tools under the brand name Cermet. Sawing non-ferrous material, such as aluminum, brass, plastic and wood with carbide tipped circular saw blades began in the 1930s. However, attempts to cut ferrous material with carbide tips failed because the existing saws lacked the speed, rigidity, and innovation required to transfer high force with low vibration. These attributes are all necessary for carbide sawing. Also, the existing tooth geometry with positive cutting angles caused cracking of the carbide tips which were harder and consequently, more brittle than the high-speed steel (HSS) circular blades.

The name carbide saw came from the tool, a circular saw blade, with silver soldered carbide tips. It competed with and just about replaced, solid or segmental HSS blades, because carbide is much harder than HSS. Before HSS saws were developed, abrasive, friction or hot saws were used and are still manufactured for certain applications. These processes create heat and are therefore called hot saws. However, HSS blades use coolant and the cut surfaces don't get hot, thus called cold saws. With the unique geometry of the teeth of carbide circular saws, the heat, developed by the cutting process is transferred into the chips and carried away with the chips. The cut surfaces stay cool. Therefore, carbide saws were also called cold saws. Other names include cold cut saws, cold circular saws, cold cut off saws or circular cold saws.

In 1963, the American Company, Ingersoll Milling Machine Co. in Rockford, Illinois, developed the first carbide plate saw that was used to cut steel plates with carbide tipped circular saw blades. The positive cutting angle of the teeth minimized the life of the tool. Between 1963 and 1969, professor Pahlitzsch and engineers Arno Willemeit and Horst Doepcke at the University of Braunschweig, developed new carbide tip geometry with a negative cutting angle and a pair of teeth which split the chip into three parts. With this development in tip geometry, it became economical to saw alloy steel billets. In 1969, Advanced Machine & Engineering Co. (AME) of Rockford, Illinois developed the first Billet Saw which used carbide tipped saw blades incorporating the "Braunschweig geometry". AME began to build these machines for the company Metalcut Inc., another Rockford based company. The machine was sold on the global market under the name Metalcut 12 and was exhibited at trade shows in Milan, Italy, and Chicago. Its cutting efficiency was eight times faster than band saws and four times faster than HSS circular cold saws and revolutionized the production sawing market.

In 1970 the US government defense department learned of the development of the new saw concept. Chamberlain Manufacturing Corporation, contracted by Frankford Arsenal, has conducted an evaluation of the Goellner carbide billet saw. Chamberlain issued a comprehensive technical report on May 29 1970. The report concluded that the new sawing concept was superior to the conventional band sawing, cold sawing and other billet severing methods in numerous objectives. Proclaimed advantages included faster cutting speeds, long blade life and improved quality of cutoff interfaces.

From 1972 to 1976 for his dissertation, Horst Doepcke, a scientific assistant at the Institute for Machine Tools and Manufacturing Engineering at the University of Braunschweig, developed a specific carbide cutting geometry for tubes which had every tooth splitting each chip into two. In 1984, Speedcut Inc. of Rockford, Illinois developed another type of carbide tooth geometry by the name of, "Notch Grind". This was used for steel billets and it would split the chip with one staggered groove per tooth. With the incorporation of this “Notch Grind” technology, saws became significantly faster than with the Braunschweig geometry. For several years after, various companies have been developing carbide saw blades with exchangeable carbide tips. These saw blades, so far, have not been proven economical for cutting steel.

== Types ==
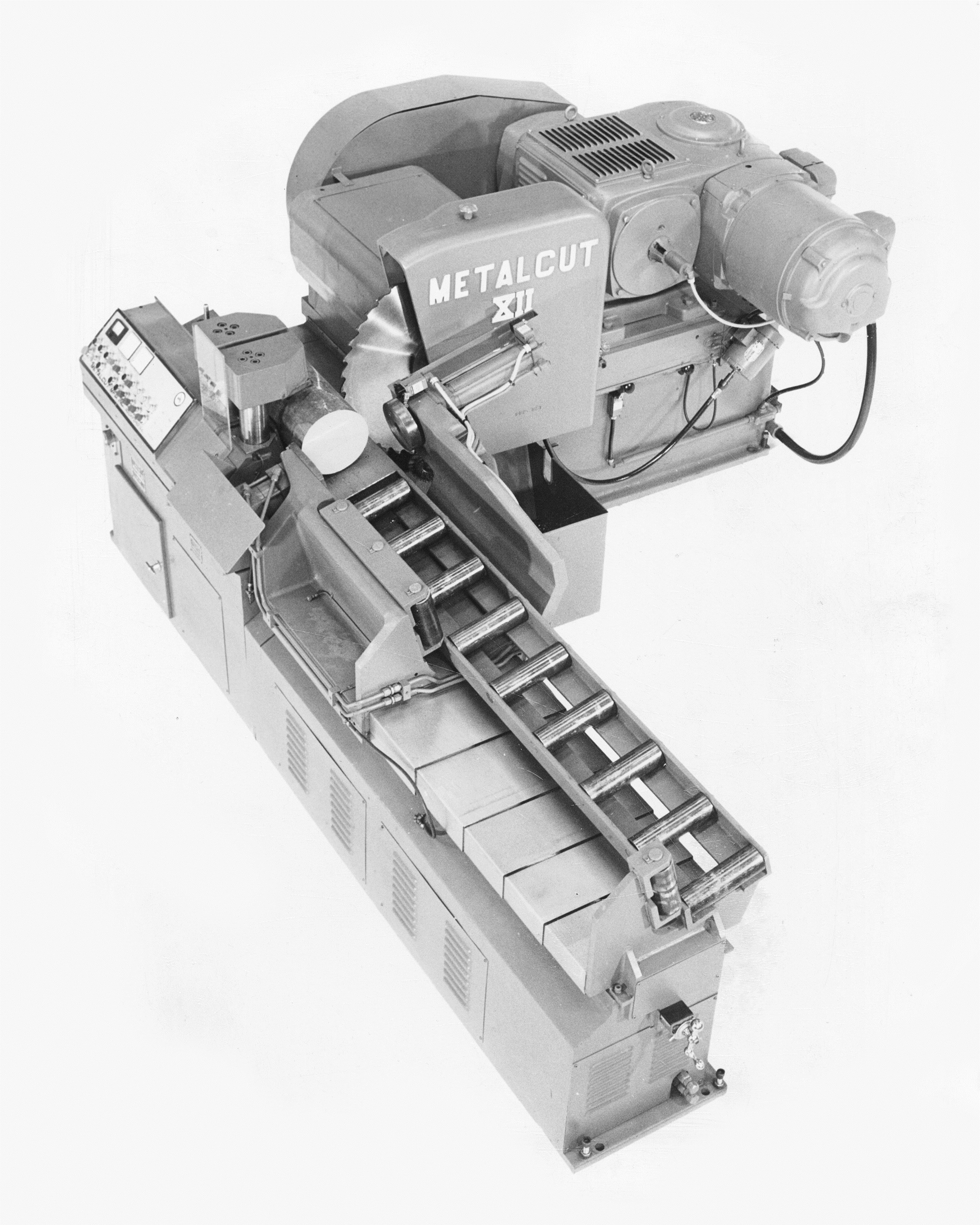
1969 Metalcut 12

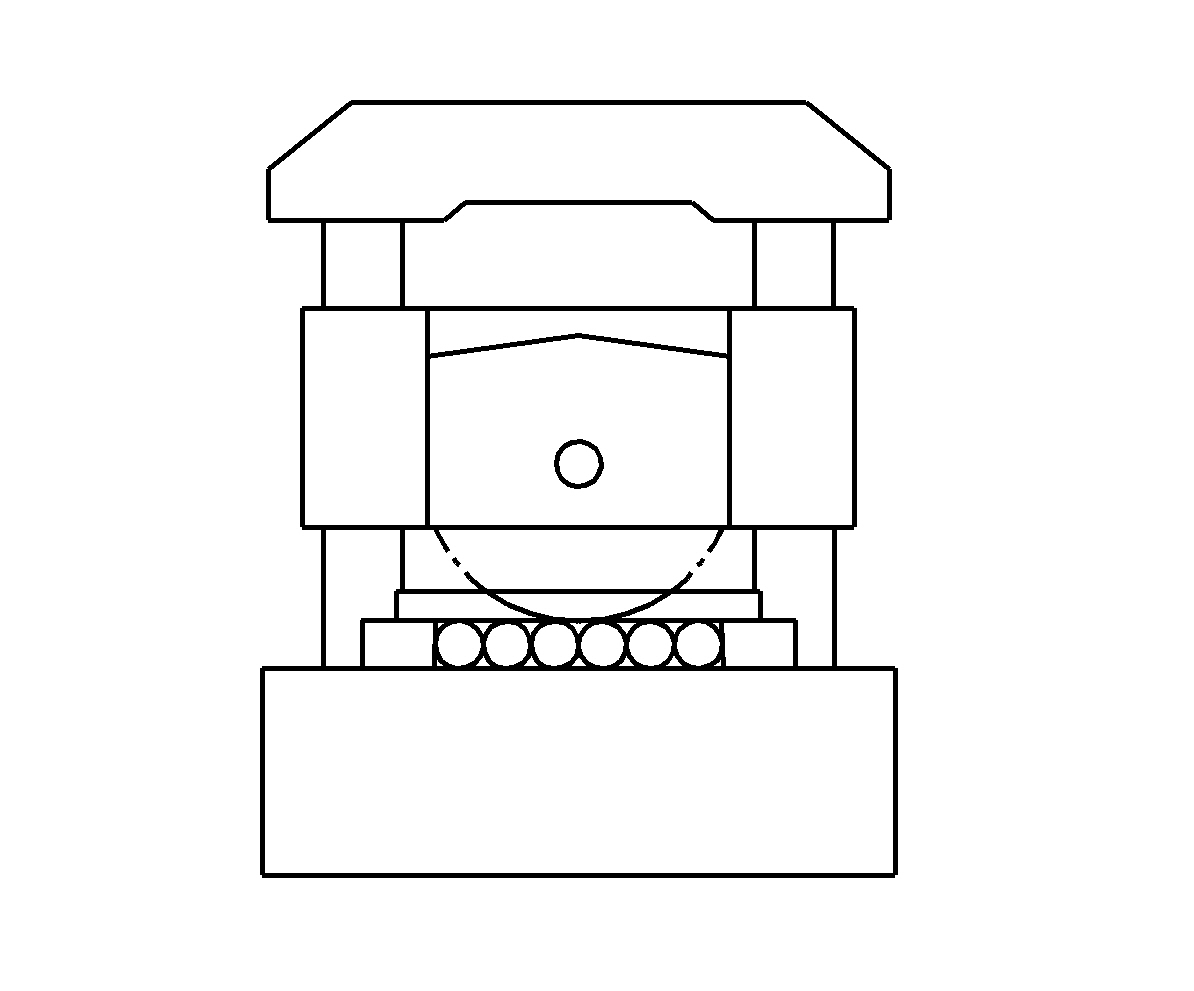
Ohler Double Column Vertical Saw with Round Ways

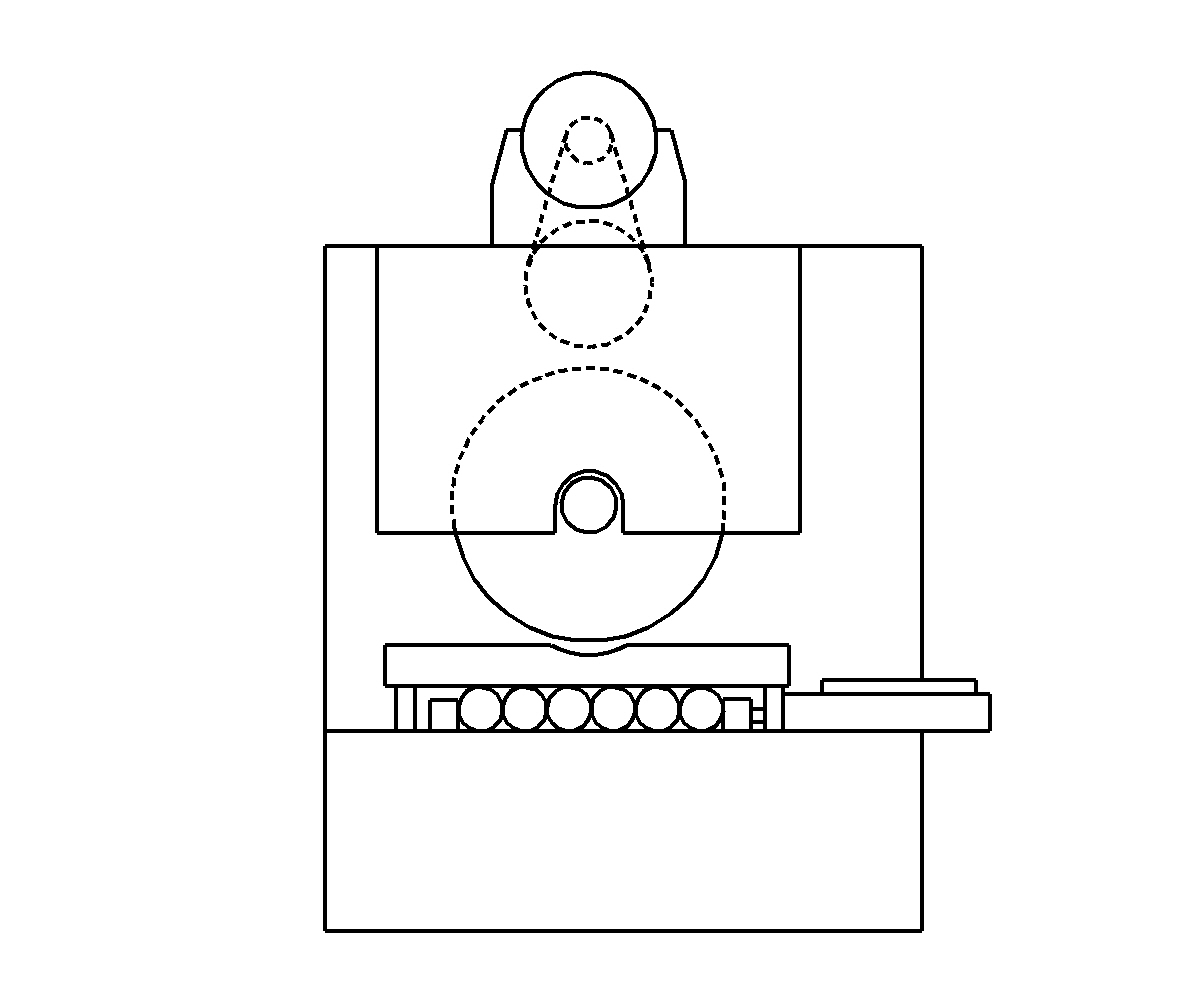
Typical Vertical Slide Layer Machine

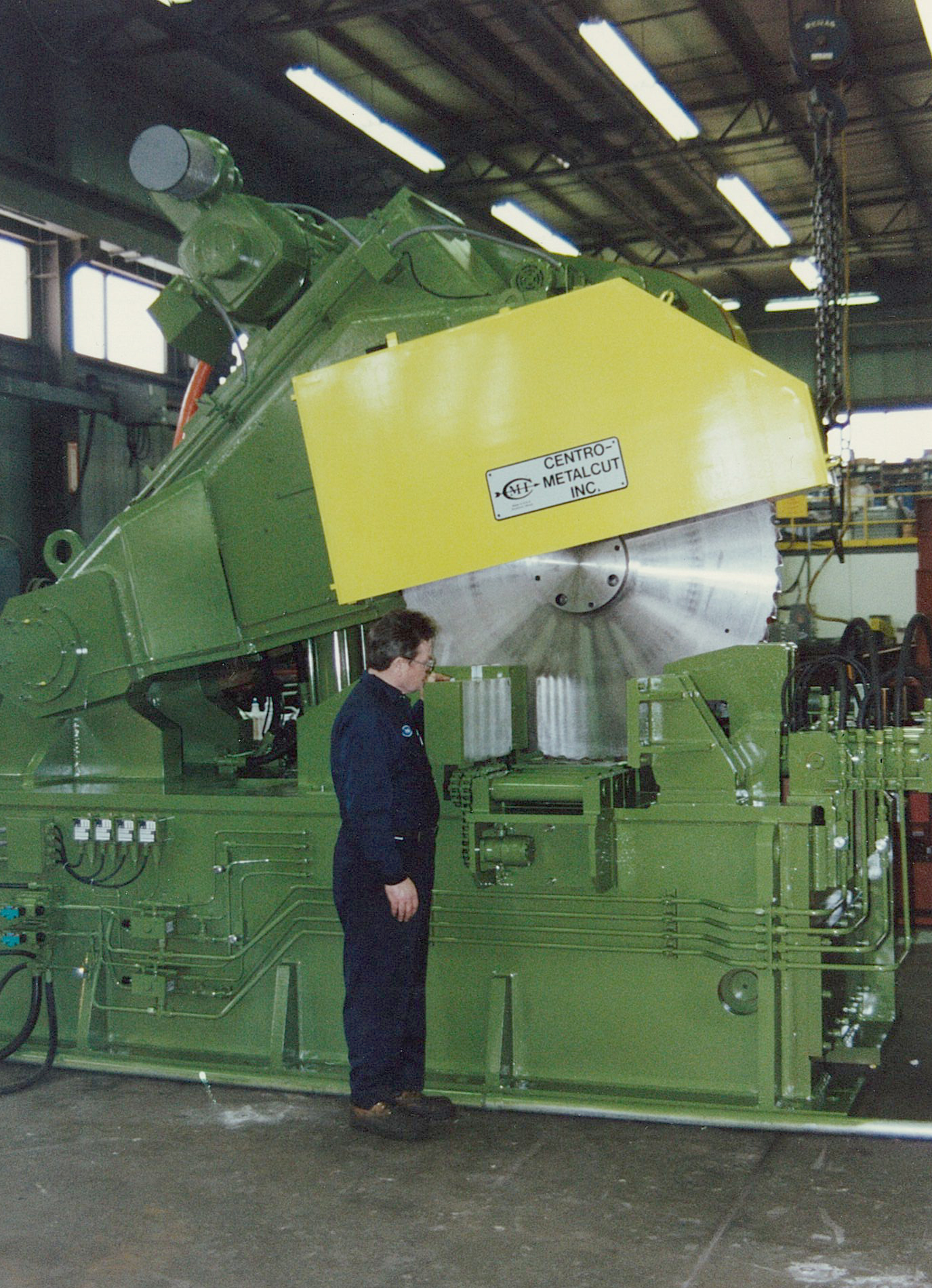
1979 Metalcut 24 pivot bar cutoff saw

=== Saws with horizontal slides ===
Horizontal slide saws are probably the most commonly used type of carbide saw. With this design the saw blade is mounted on the gearbox spindle, where it slides on horizontal ways and enters horizontally into the billet.

In 1969, the first horizontal carbide billet saw was developed by AME and built for Metalcut Inc. For the first time, Hennig telescopic steel way covers and steel aprons were used to protect the vital components of the saw from high velocity flying chips that are difficult to control.

=== Saws with vertical slides ===
The saw blade for this type of saw enters vertically into the material. These saws are often used as layer saws, whereby a multitude of tubes, profiles, or bars can be simultaneously cut horizontally.

In 1974, the first carbide saw with a vertical slide was developed by Arno Willemeit, the co-inventor of the Braunschweig tooth geometry. It was produced by the company Ohler in Remscheid, Germany. Framag, an Austrian company later took over the production of this type of machine and also built it as a layer saw. Ohler had previously built vertical HSS saws with double round ways and converted them later into carbide saws.

=== Carbide saws with inclined ways ===
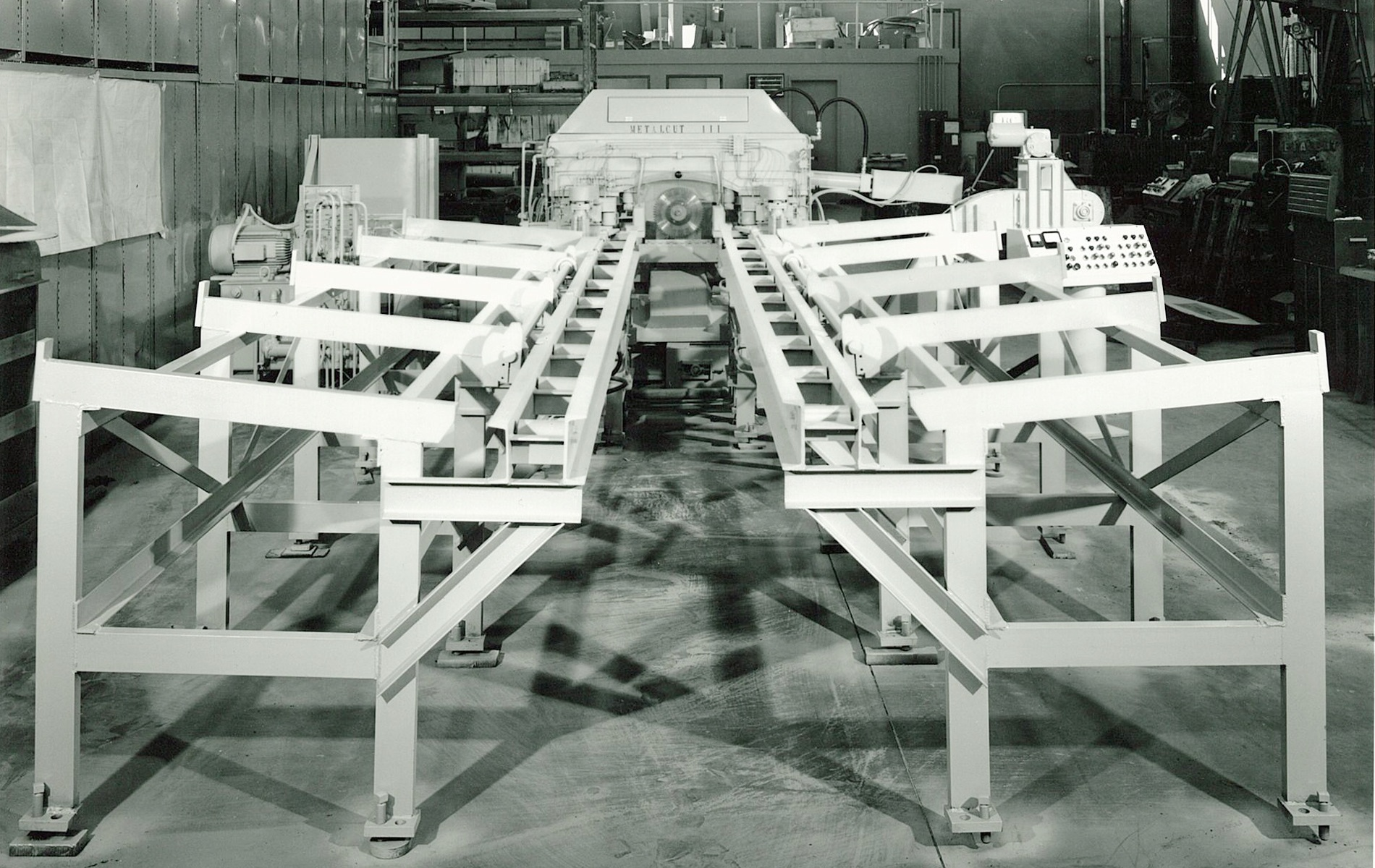
1973 Metalcut III dual pivot saw

These are more expensive than conventional horizontal slide saws. They are most effectively used for cutting railroad rails, because the saw blade enters optimally into the rail profile.

=== Pivot saws ===
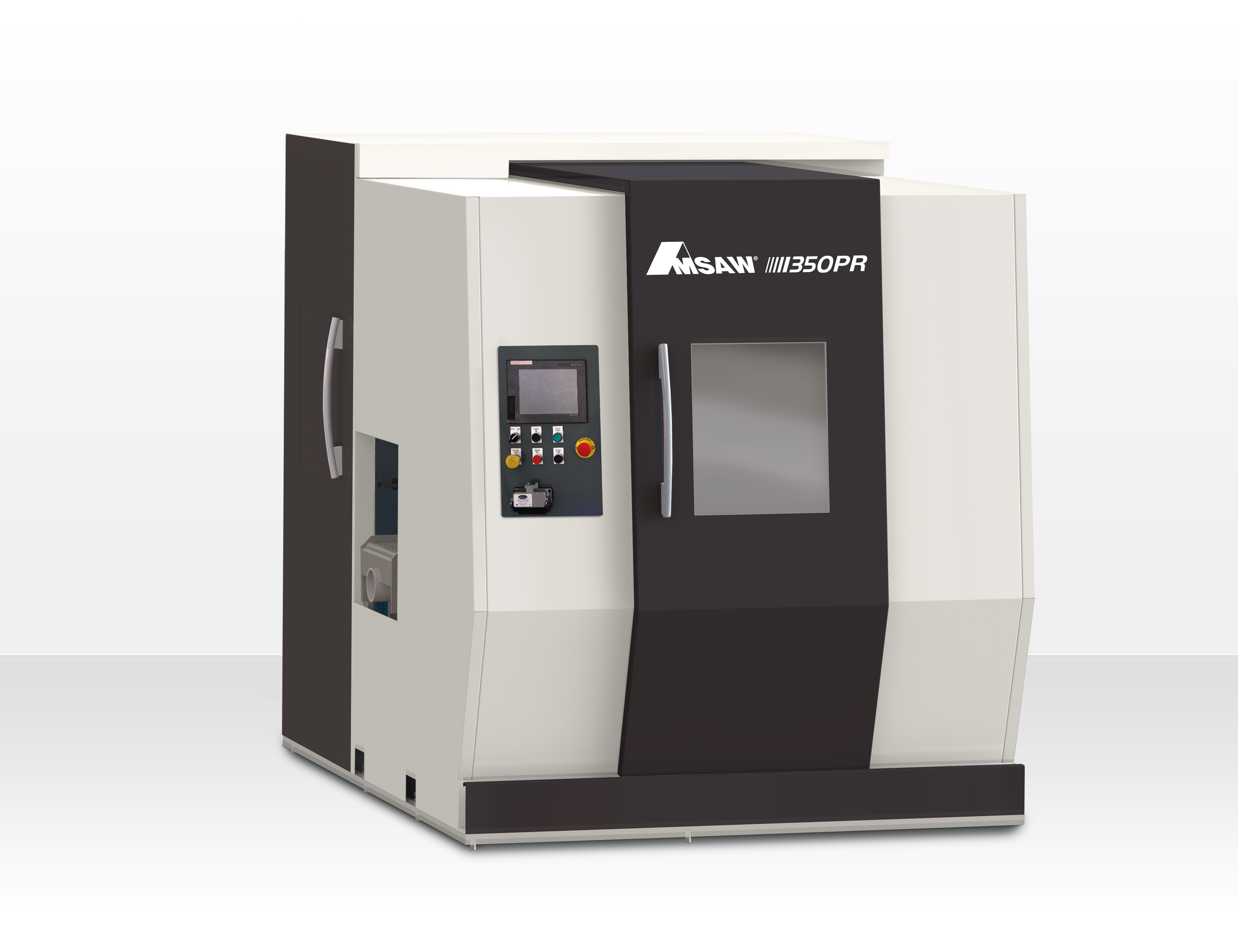
2011 AMSAW 350PR

Pivot saws were originally used as HSS saws for cutting small profiles and tubes. In the later 1970s these saws began to be used for larger steel profiles on construction projects (Kaltenbach).

In 1973, Metalcut developed the first high-efficiency carbide pivot saw for 75 mm (3 inches) bars, where the center of rotation of the gearbox was mounted to the floor plate. This saw cuts on both sides of the pivot axis, one bar each, and was more productive as a result.

In 1976, the company Carbide Cutoff Inc. (CCI) in Rockford, IL developed a larger production carbide saw of this kind in order to be able to compete against the horizontal slide saw from Metalcut Inc. This machine successfully cut billets up to 8 inches (200 mm) in diameter.

This pivot type saw was also used by Metalcut Inc., as either a layer saw or billet saw which cut billet-diameters of up to 600 mm (24 inches). The pivot is located above the machine bed and the saw blade enters vertically in an arch-shaped manner into the material, but does not have a closed force loop.

In 1994, AME developed a cost-effective pivot saw with the brand name AMSAW 200 for the US market. In 2011, AME of Rockford, IL, developed a high-efficiency carbide saw where the pivot axis of the gearbox is fixed on the lower end of the machine bed, for cutting 350 mm (14 inch) billets. The force is contained in a close loop and the machine is extremely stiff. In this machine the chip flow is also improved, as the chips are thrown directly onto the chip conveyor.

== Special models ==
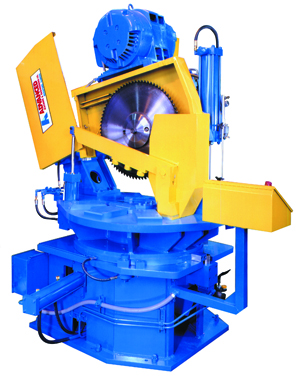
Miter Rail Saw

=== Plate saws ===
In 1963, Ingersoll Milling Machine Co. Rockford, Illinois developed a saw which cut plates made of high-strength carbon steel using carbide saw blades. The horizontal ways were mounted on a beam above the plate.

Later, the company Oliver Machinery Co. of Detroit, Michigan developed a plate saw where the gearbox slid underneath the plate on a machine bed and cut the plate from below.

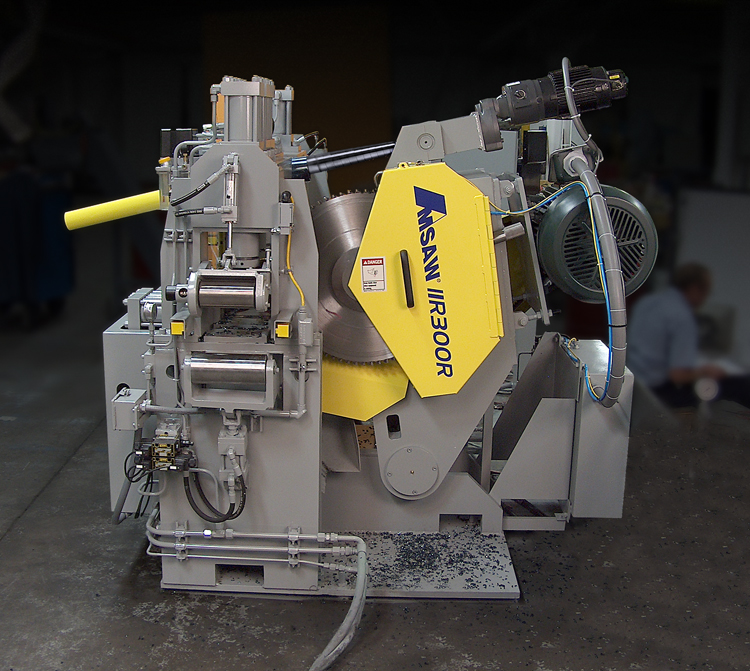

=== Railroad rail saws ===
In 1973, Metalcut developed the first carbide rail saw which was later produced by other companies including Wagner. In 1997, AME developed an economical rail saw under the brand name AMSAW 300-R, which is still widely used throughout the U.S. In 1999, AME built a special model of a carbide saw for miter-cutting railroad rails for frogs and switches. In 2011, AME develops a special model which is integrated as a double saw in a railroad car and used for repair work of railroad tracks in the USA. It replaced abrasive saws which had been used before. These abrasive saws were guilty of causing forest fires due to the hot chips and sparks. Consequently, these hazardous machines were replaced with AMSAW cold saws.

=== Layer saws ===
In 1974, Metalcut developed two layer saws which cut the ends of up to six "C" profiles. The profiles approached the saws horizontally, in layers. The first saw cut the front ends, the second the rear ones, whereby the latter was movable on tracks and which therefore cut different lengths. These machines were built as pivot saws and cut from the bottom up through the profiles.

In 1976, this pivot saw was also used for cutting tubes in layers.

Later, Wagner and Framag build similar saws with a vertical design.

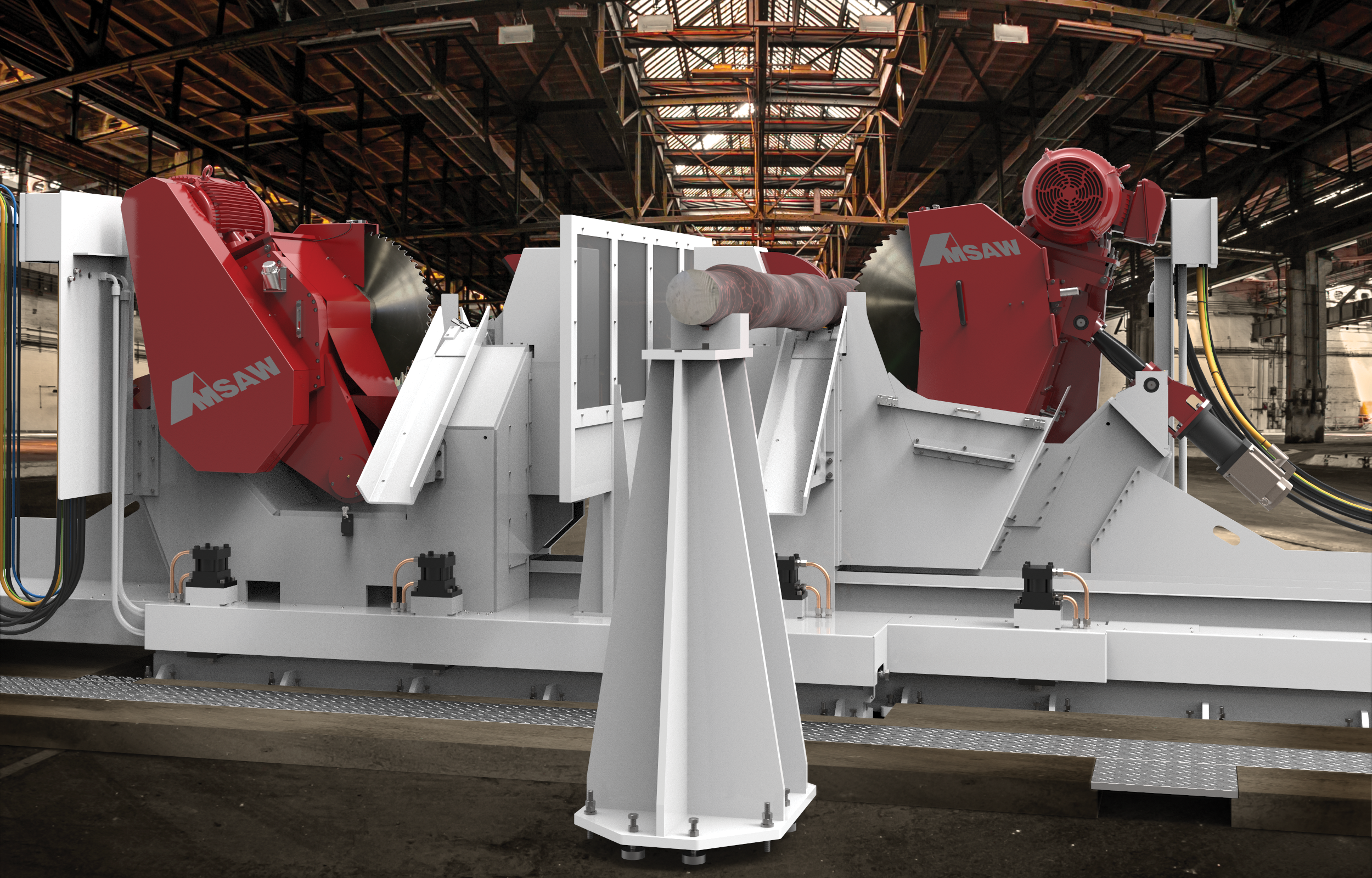

=== Carbide hot saws ===
In 2008, AME developed a carbide hot saw which cuts off the ends on hot-forged axles for the railroad industry.

=== Carbide ring saws ===
Thick-walled rings are hot-rolled and often have to be cut in slices. MFL Liezen, of Austria, developed such a saw which cut these rings from the inner diameter. AME Rockford, IL also offers a saw of this kind; however it cuts the rings from the outside.

== General design ==
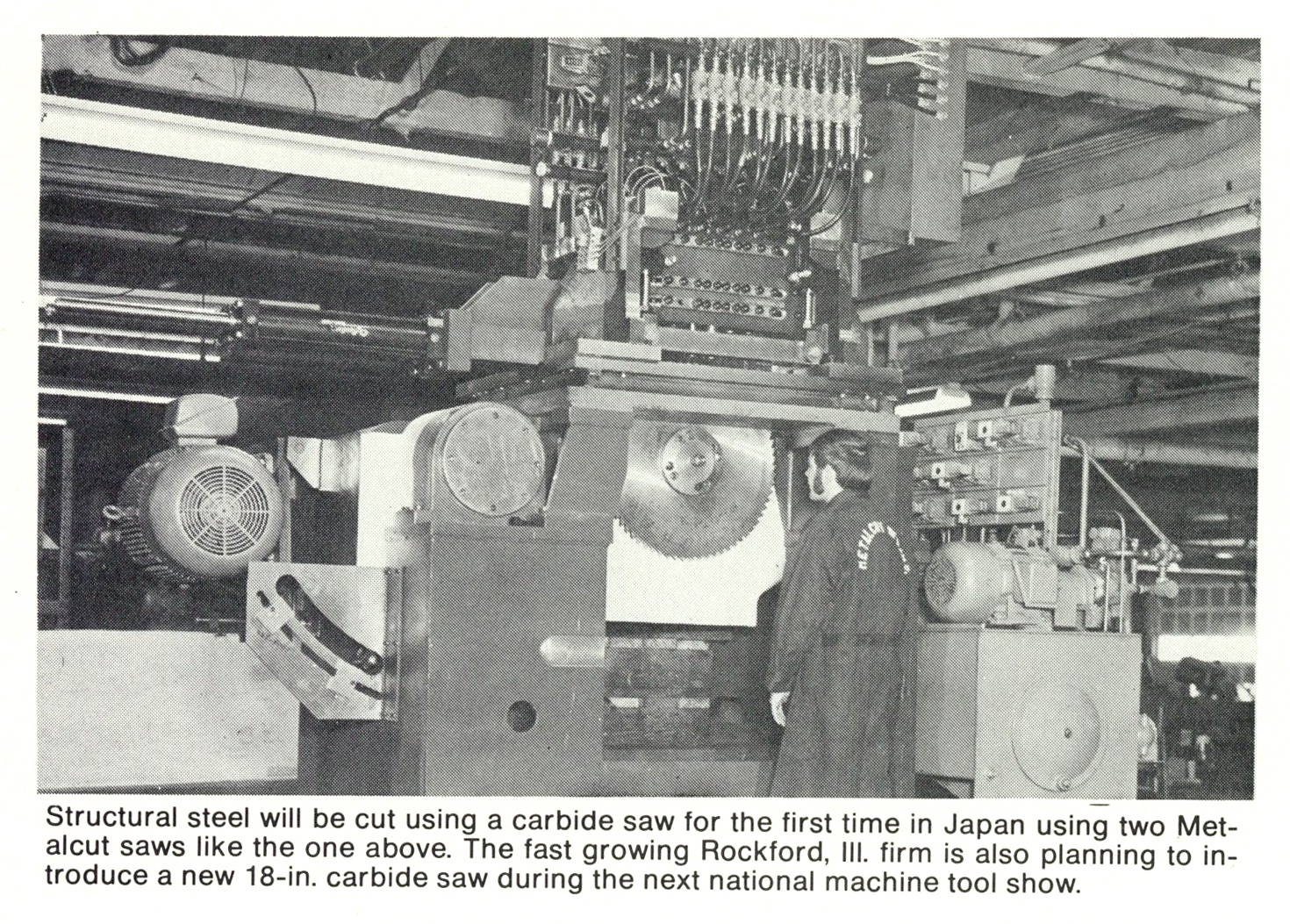
1974 Metalcut 12 pivot layer saw

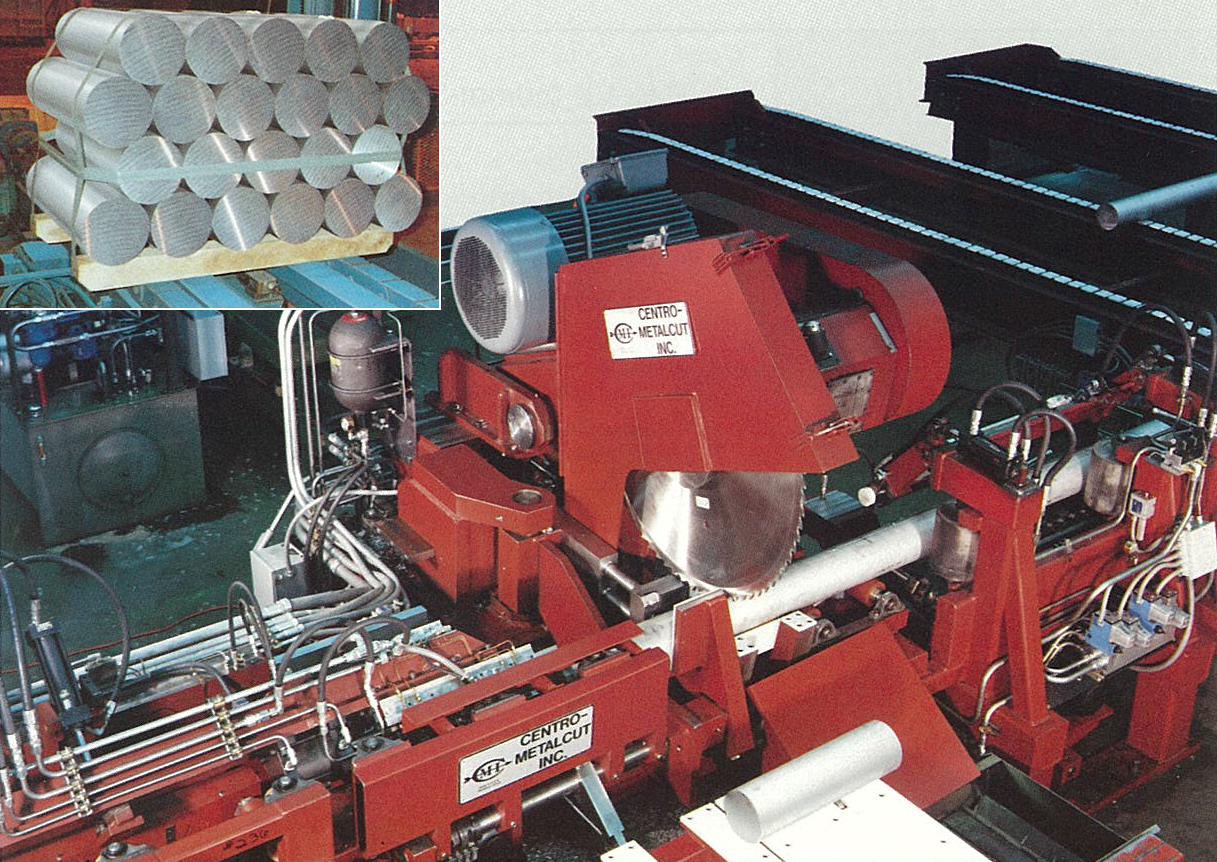
Metalcut XII-P

Carbide saws with ways (horizontal, vertical or tilted slide-arrangement) consist of a welded base made of solid steel plates which are sufficiently ribbed and often filled with vibration dampening material. This base absorbs the occurring forces and dampens vibrations. Case-hardened ways are bolted on the base where the gearbox slides.

The slide is guided by taper gibs with a minimum play, or hydraulically operated gibs which can be preloaded to eliminate play, in order to obtain the necessary rigidity. Recently, preloaded linear ways have also been used. Experts still debate, if preloaded box ways with low friction plastic lining are better vibration dampening than preloaded, hardened linear ways with hardened balls or rollers.

=== Feed system ===
The feed system consists of either a hydraulic cylinder or a ball screw and gear reducer, which is powered by a servo motor.

=== Gearbox ===
Most of the time, low backlash case-hardened gears mounted in ball-or-taper-roller bearings are used. Depending on the size of the saw blades, a maximum of five gear sets with a gear reduction of up to 40:1 can be used. Variable speed motors of up to 150 KW drive the gearbox directly or via timing or "V" belts. Many saws have the blade mounting flange integrated within the spindle. This is less expensive, but requires expensive maintenance when the blade mounting surfaces wear. However, some more innovative saws have removable drive hubs which are mounted rigidly, and can be easily replaced. Some saws also use flywheels on the input shaft of the gearbox to smooth the fluctuating torque.

=== Fixture ===
It commonly consists of two hydraulic clamping cylinders which clamp the material on both sides of the saw blade horizontally, vertically, or angularly. In order to improve the life of the saw blade, the material is separated from the blade on both sides before the saw blade is retracted from the cut.

=== Saw blade mounting ===
The saw blade must be firmly mounted to the driveshaft in order to transmit the massive amount of torque without vibration. A larger blade flange usually reduces the blade vibration, but requires a bigger blade diameter. In order to reduce the blade costs, several producers use smaller flanges in combination with blade stabilizers and can thereby reduce the tool costs.

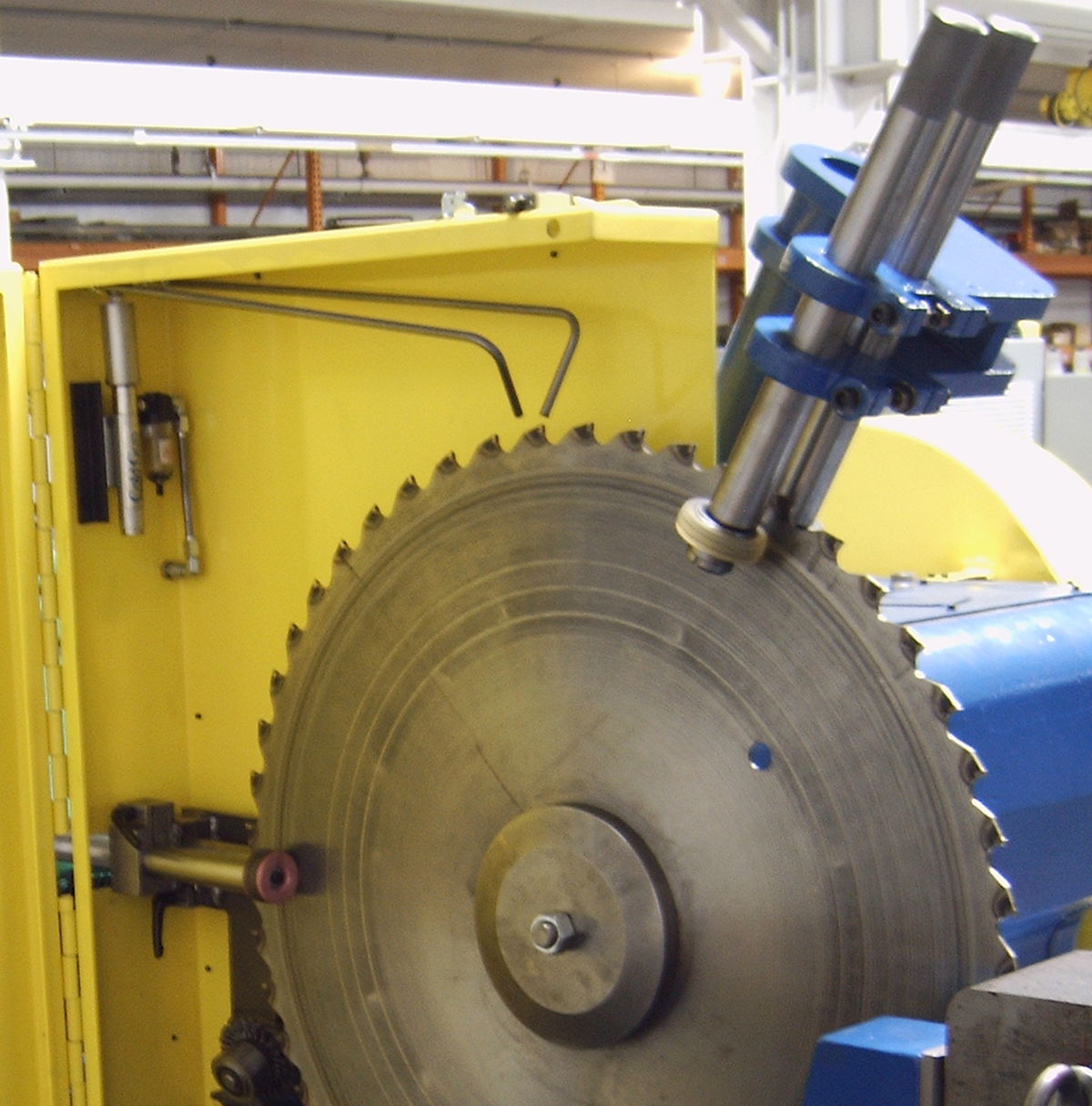
Metalcut Roller stabilizer

=== Blade stabilizers ===
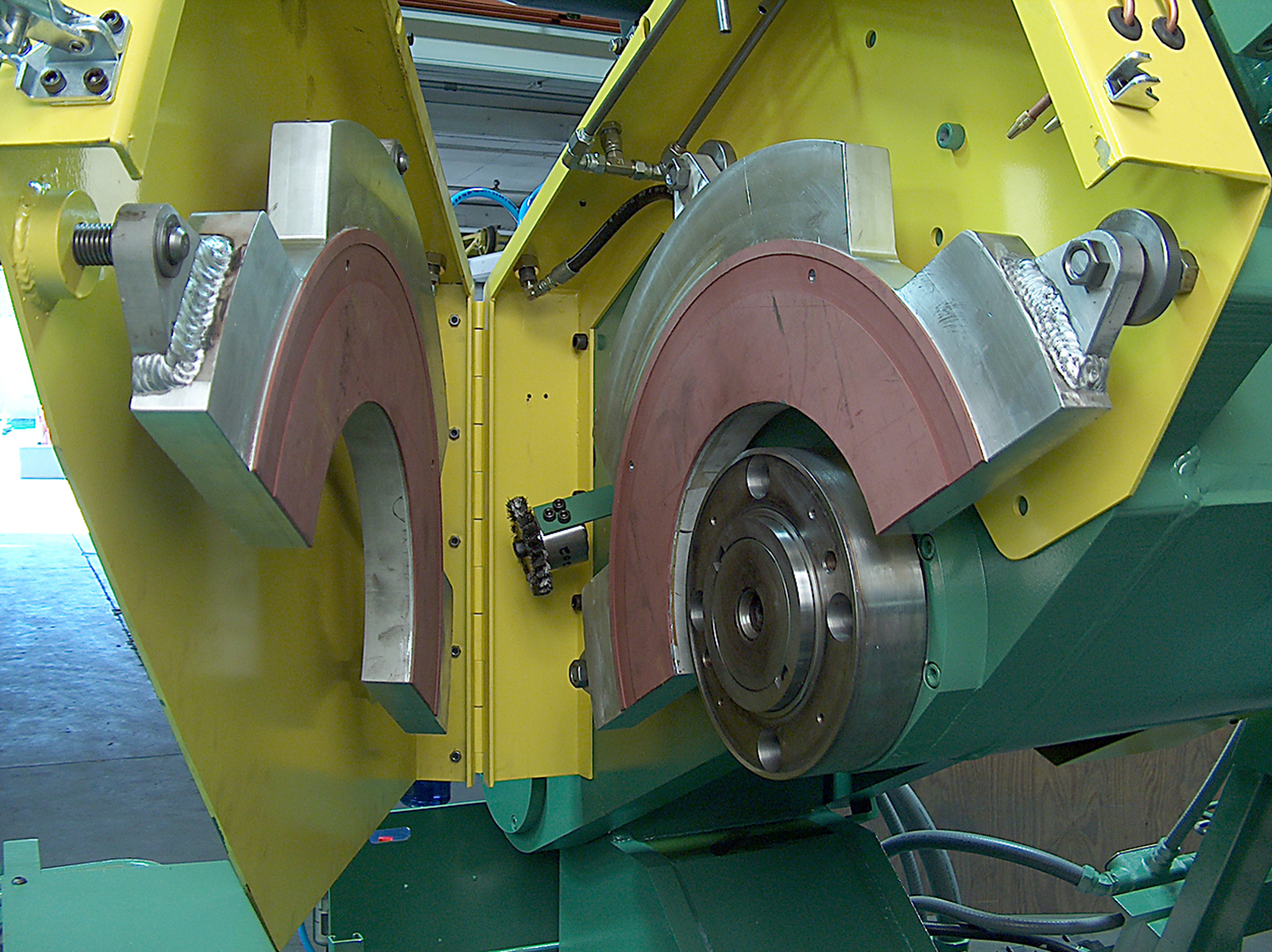
Amsaw Segmental stabilizer

Since carbide saw blades are circular, they are radially the stiffest elements of the power train in the direction of the feed, but very unstable perpendicular to the feed direction. Due to the thin blade body the blades must be stabilized to minimize the side vibration amplitudes. When the first experiments with carbide saws were made, a development engineer of Advanced Machine & Engineering in Rockford stabilized the blade by using a broomstick which he pushed against the vibrating blade, minimizing the vibrations. From this experience a blade stabilizer was developed using two plastic coated ball bearings mounted on eccentric shafts and supported by a welded bracket to the gearbox. Horst Doepcke, who saw this method during experiments carried out by Metalcut, also describes them in his dissertation “Sägen von Rohren mit hartmetallbestückten Kreissägeblättern”. Further Amsaw developments lead to segment stabilizers, whereby on both sides of the blade adjustable plastic-coated plates minimized the blade vibrations (AME). Other manufacturers later used similar slide elements as “vibration dampeners”. These erroneously labeled vibration dampeners did not however dampen the oscillations, but merely minimized the amplitudes. Mr. Doepke describes this function in detail in his dissertation. Recently the Advanced Machine & Engineering Company has developed a pair of front stabilizers for its AMSAW machines arranged close to the point at which the blade enters the material. These stabilizers hydraulically extend, when the carbide teeth have moved past the stabilizer tips before cutting and stabilize the blade which also help to guide the blade into the cut to improve the accuracy. Other forms of stabilizers are listed in German in the VDI Verlag Nr. 1999 by Dipl.-Ing. Rainer Liebrecht. This report especially addresses the effect of vibration on saw blades.

=== Measuring device ===
In general, there are two different types of measuring systems:

1. Measurement with gripper tongs: The billet is clamped with gripper tongs which slide on ways and are operated by a ball screw- servo motor combination.

2. Measurement with measuring stops: The billets are driven via roller conveyor toward an adjustable stop. This stop can be accurately positioned by a ball screw servo mechanism and usually incorporates a shock absorber to dampen the impact. This method is used for longer pieces.

=== Control ===
Automatic production saws are mostly operated by PLC.

== Blade diameter ==
A small diameter saw blade is less expensive and requires less torque to drive. A thinner saw blade is wasting less material and needs less energy to turn. Therefore, it is desired to use smaller diameter drive hubs for blade mounting and thinner blades to be able to saw larger diameter material with smaller diameter saw blades. These criteria however weaken the lateral stiffness of the blade and the blade may vibrate more due to the large diameter / blade thickness ratio.

== Gear backlash ==
The backlash of the gears, especially the spindle gear set, is also critical. The ratio between an 1800 mm (70”) diameter blade and the approximate 250 mm (10”) pitch diameter of the spindle gear is about 7/1. Thus, a tooth play of 0.025 mm (.001”) results in a 0.18 mm (.007”) lost motion on the tooth of the blade.

This large amount of lost motion added to the torsional windup of the gear train, when a tooth enters the cut and relaxes when it exits, induces torsional vibration and must be reduced to a minimum by using anti-backlash mechanisms or by grinding the gear sets to an absolute minimum play.

== Machine stiffness ==
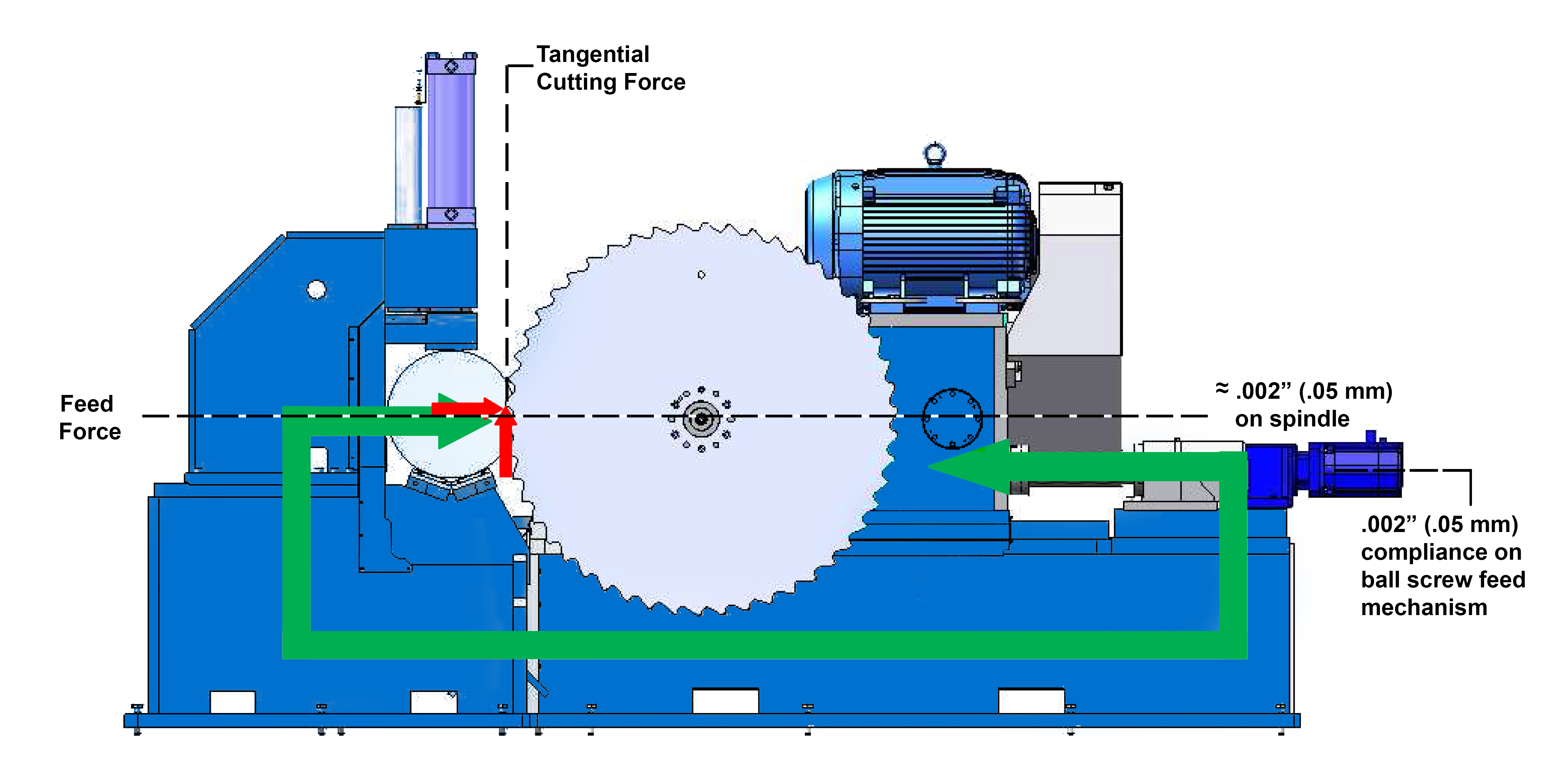
fig.2: Horizontal slide saw with open loop force flow

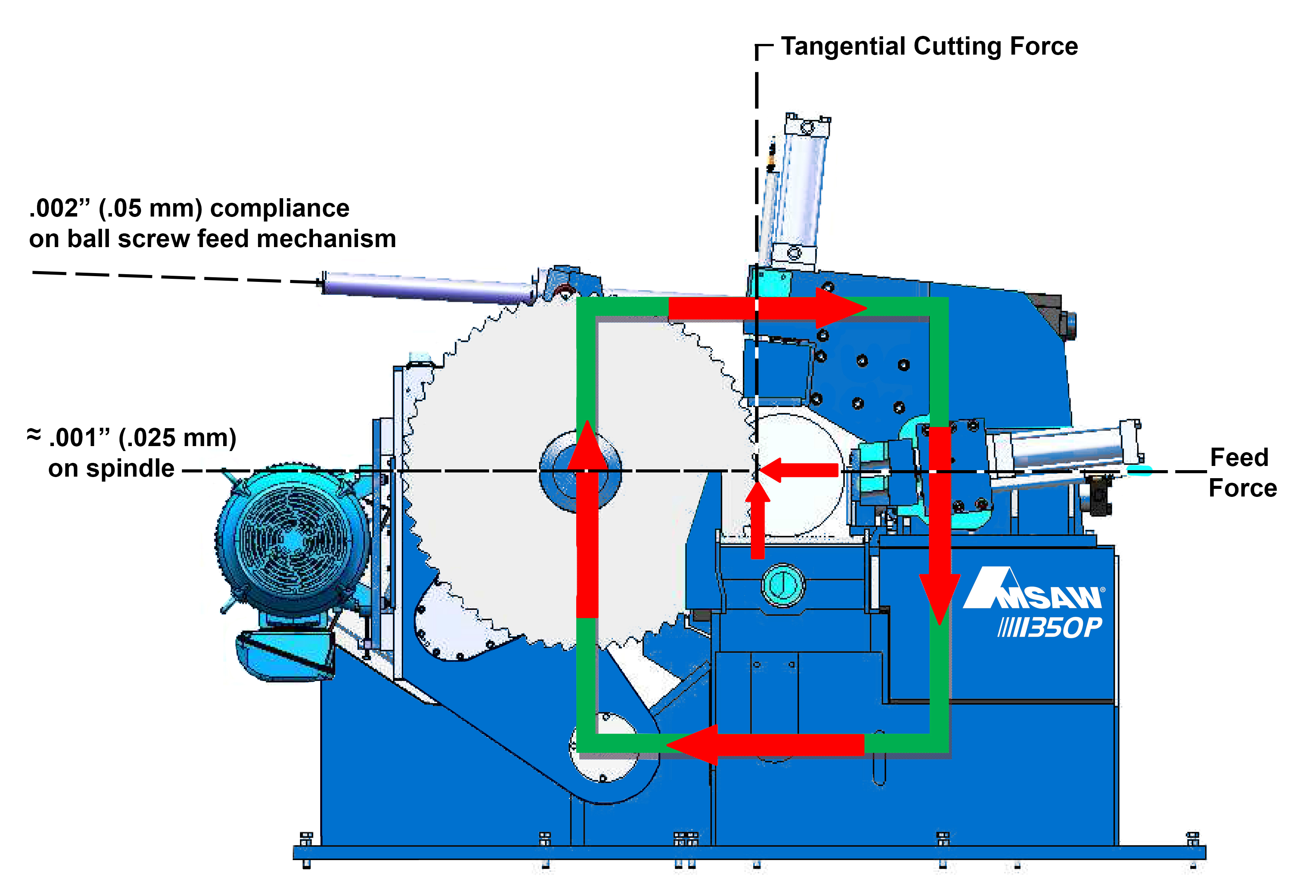
fig.1: pivot saw with a close loop force flow

When a circular carbide-tipped saw blade enters or exits the material, only one tooth is cutting. The fluctuation of the load, when the tooth enters and exits the cut, induces vibrations and requires a very stiff gear box and machine.

A pivot saw has the highest degree of stiffness, because the forces are arranged in a closed loop (fig.1). If we assume that the base of such a saw is very rigid, the force will flow from the pivot of the gearbox to the ball screw feed system in a closed loop, whereby the cutting force engages in the middle, approximately, between rotation point and ball screw. This arrangement substantially reduces the lost motion and compliance in the feed system. Furthermore, the ball screw drive which forces the blade into the cut is bolted to the fixture frame which again is clamped to the billet and gives this arrangement additional rigidity.

Saws with horizontal or tilted slides have an open loop force flow (fig.2) and maintain any lost motion and compliance of the feed system.

== Summary ==
Closed loop vertical slide saws are the stiffest, but also the most expensive machines. They require less space than horizontal or angular slide saws, but it is also more difficult to control the horizontal chip flow. They are also difficult to service.

Horizontal and angular slide type saws must be built heavier to maintain the same stiffness as vertical or pivot saws. The chip flow is downward and therefore better to control than vertical saws.

Horizontal cutting pivot saws are the most cost efficient machines. They require less parts and floor space and have favorable downward chip control. The closed loop system reduces compliance and hence can be built lighter, while maintaining a high amount of stiffness.
