= Abrasive saw =

Type of circular saw

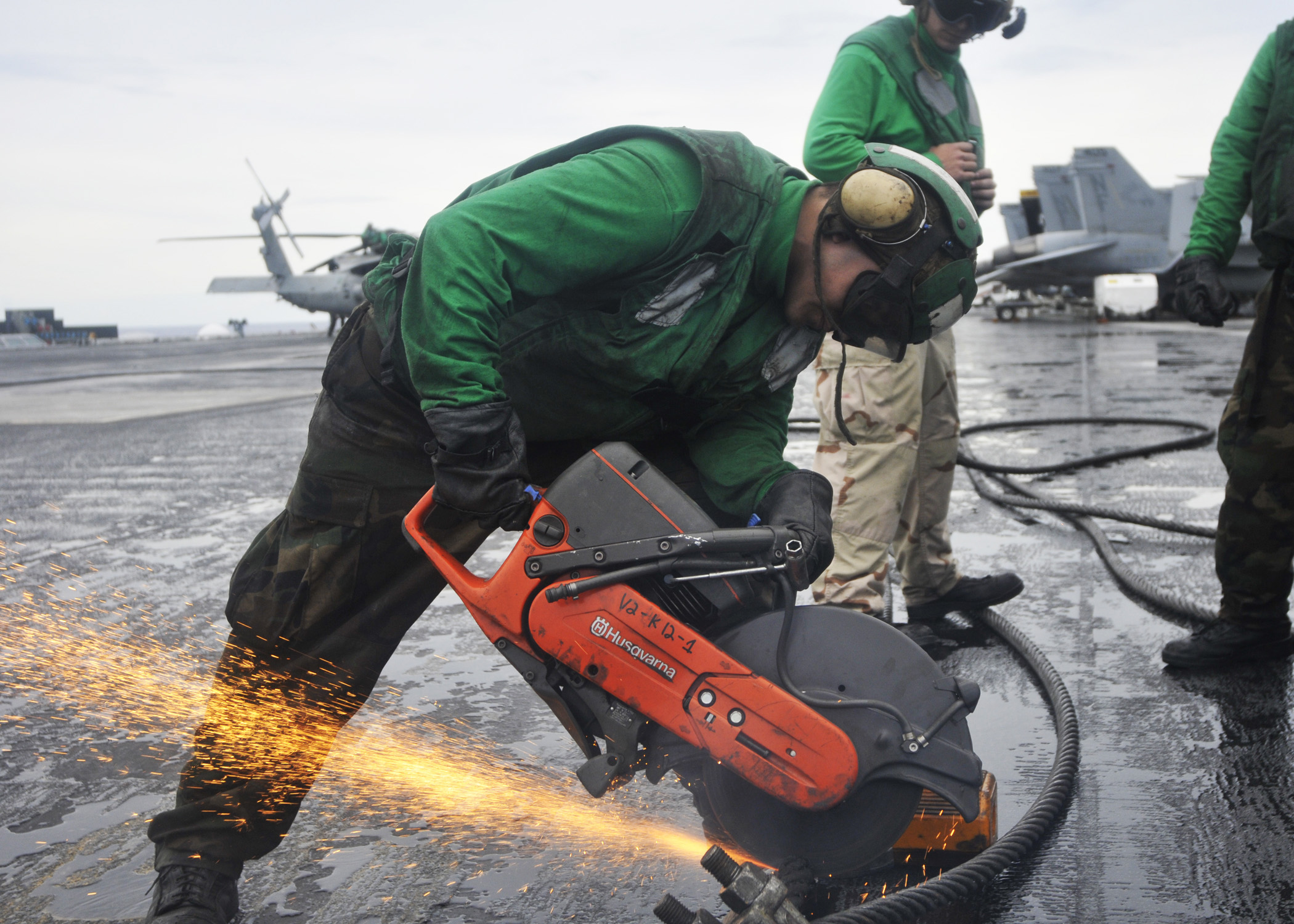
Cutting heavy steel cable with a Husqvarna freehand saw

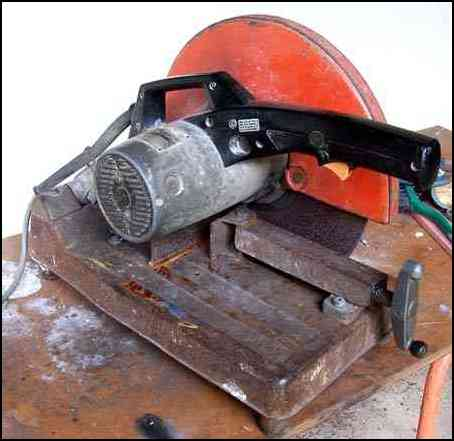
Steel cut-off saw for workshop use

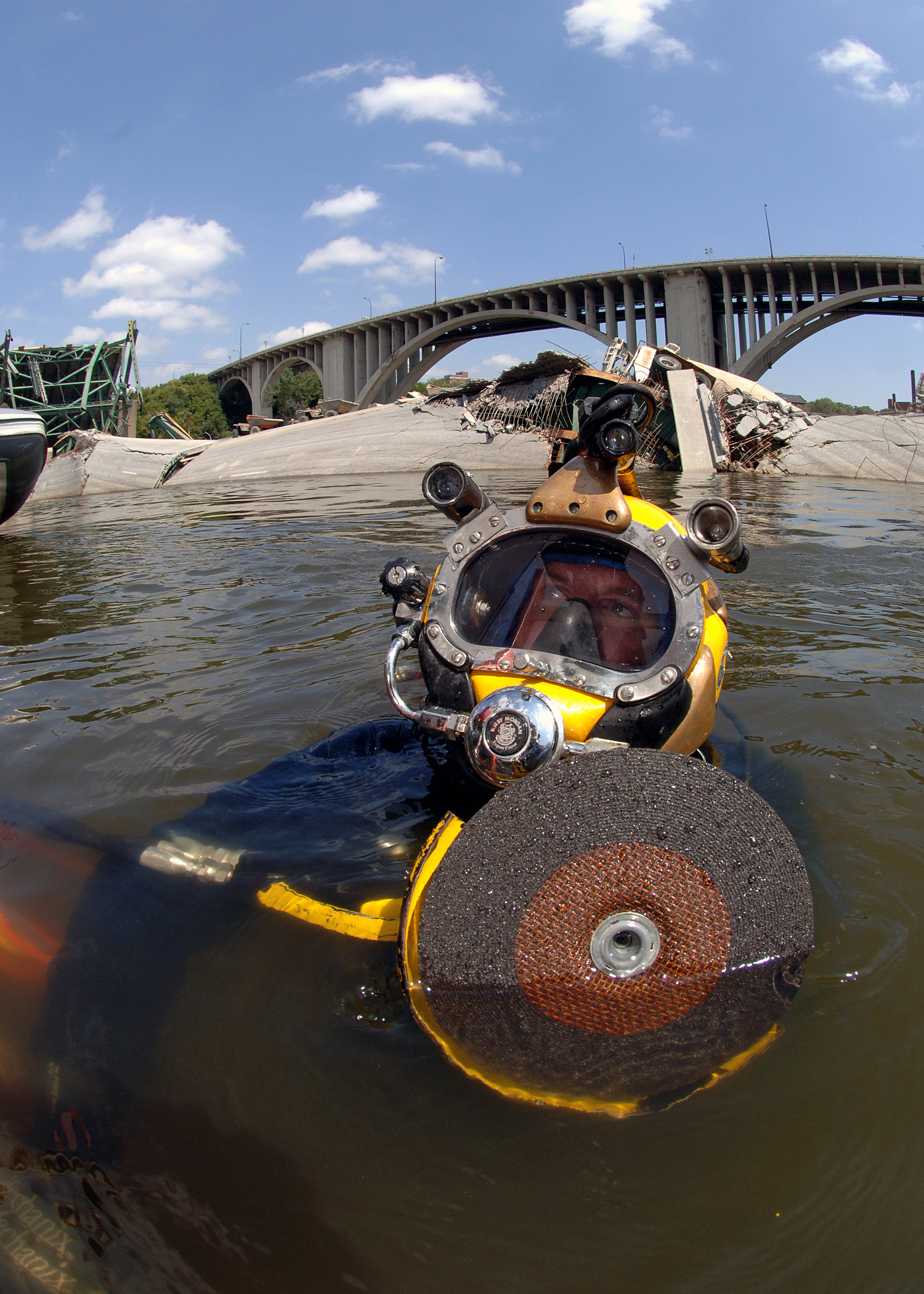
US Navy diver preparing to use an abrasive saw for underwater salvage

An abrasive saw, also known as a cut-off saw or chop saw, is a circular saw (a kind of power tool) which is typically used to cut hard materials, such as metals, tile, and concrete. The cutting action is performed by an abrasive disc, similar to a thin grinding wheel. Technically speaking this is not a saw, as it does not use regularly shaped edges (teeth) for cutting.

These saws are available in a number of configurations, including table top, free hand, and walk behind models. In the table top models, which are commonly used to cut tile and metal, the cutting wheel and motor are mounted on a pivoting arm attached to a fixed base plate. Table top saws are often electrically powered and generally have a built-in vise or other clamping arrangement. The free hand designs are typically used to cut concrete, asphalt, and pipe on construction sites. They are designed with the handles and motor near the operator, with the blade at the far end of the saw. Free hand saws do not feature a vise, because the materials being cut are larger and heavier. Walk-behind models, sometimes called flat saws are larger saws which use a stand or cart to cut into concrete floors as well as asphalt and concrete paving materials.

Abrasive saws typically use composite friction disk blades known as "cutoff wheels/blades" to abrasively cut through the steel. The blades are consumable items as they wear throughout the cut. The abrasive blades for these saws are typically 14 in (360 mm) in diameter and 7/64 in (2.8 mm) thick, though they can be thousandths of an inch thick and only 2" in diameter. Larger saws use 410 mm (16 in) diameter blades. Blades are available for steel and stainless steel. Abrasive saws can also use superabrasive (i.e., diamond and cubic boron nitride or CBN) blades, which last longer than conventional abrasive materials and do not generate as hazardous particulate matter. Superabrasive materials are more commonly used when cutting concrete, asphalt, and tile; however, they are also suitable for cutting ferrous metals.

A member of the Technisches Hilfswerk using an abrasive saw

Rubber-bonded abrasives are a niche but important sector of the abrasive cutoff wheel manufacturing space. These blades can be extremely thin and use specialized machines known as "Cutoff Machines". These machines use the extremely thin rubber-bonded wheels to reduce loss of material compared to a thicker-metal blade which would produce burring, lose more material, and cause inconsistent finishes. Rubber-bonded blades finish as they cut reducing the time it take to produce sections of materials such as Molybdenum, Inconel, Steel, Iron, Brass, and more. Many industries such as the aerospace industry and automotive industry use these wheels to produce fasteners and bolts with extremely precise measurements.

Since their introduction, portable cut-off saws have made many building site jobs easier. With these saws, lightweight steel fabrication previously performed in workshops using stationary power bandsaws or cold saws can be done on-site. Abrasive saws have replaced more expensive and hazardous acetylene torches in many applications, such as cutting rebar. In addition, these saws allow construction workers to cut through concrete, asphalt, and pipe on job sites in a more precise manner than is possible with heavy equipment.

== See also ==
- Diamond disc cutter
- Angle grinder
- Cold saw
- Miter box
- Ring saw

== Sources ==
- Madsen, David A. (2004). Print Reading for Engineering and Manufacturing Technology. Delmar Learning Blueprint Reading Series (2nd, Illustrated ed.). Cengage Learning. ISBN 1401851630.
