= Circular saw =

Power tool

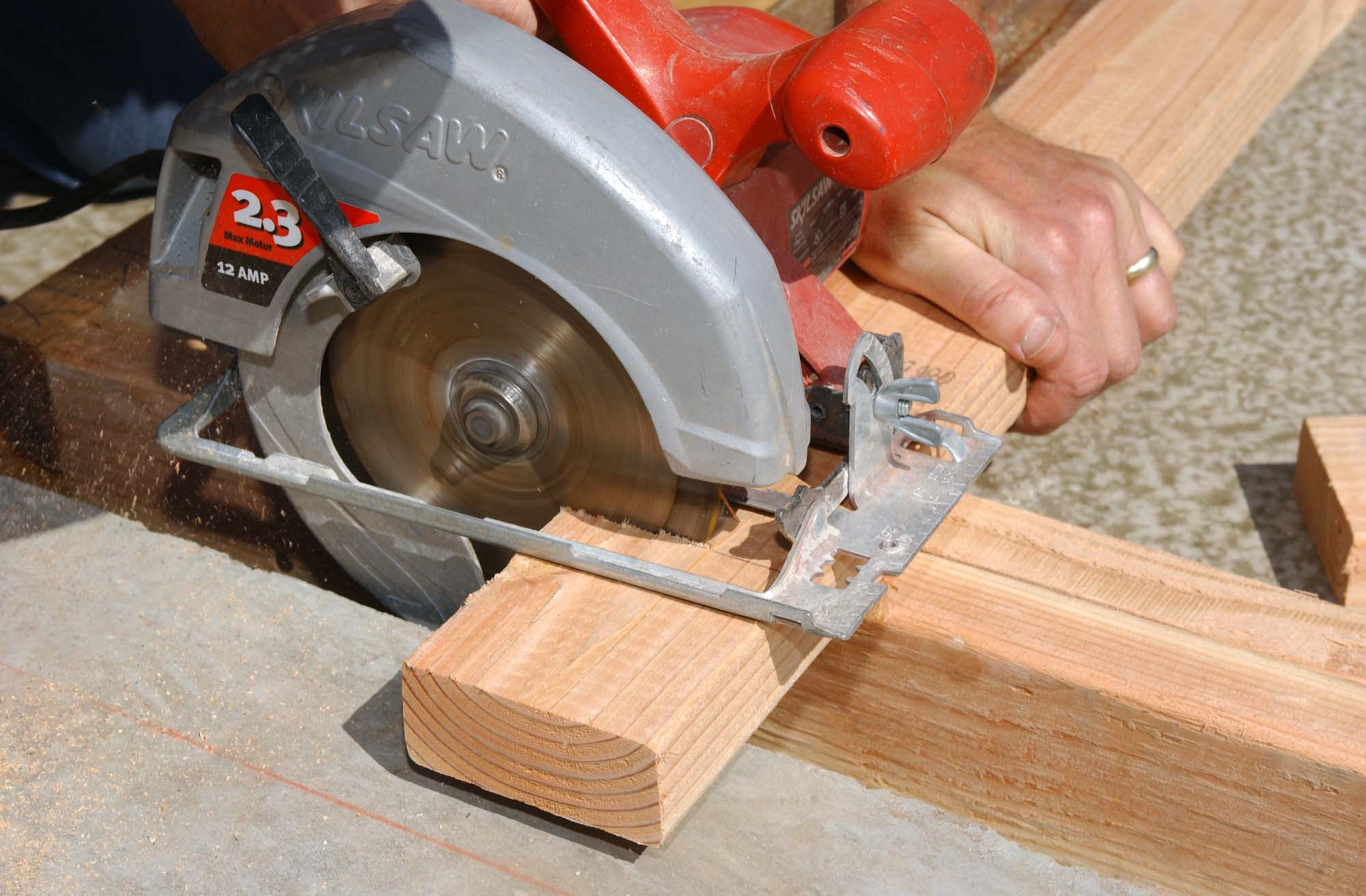
A hand-held circular saw is the most conventional circular saw.

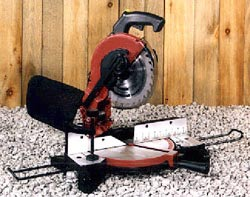
This miter saw is a circular saw mounted to swing to crosscut wood at an angle.

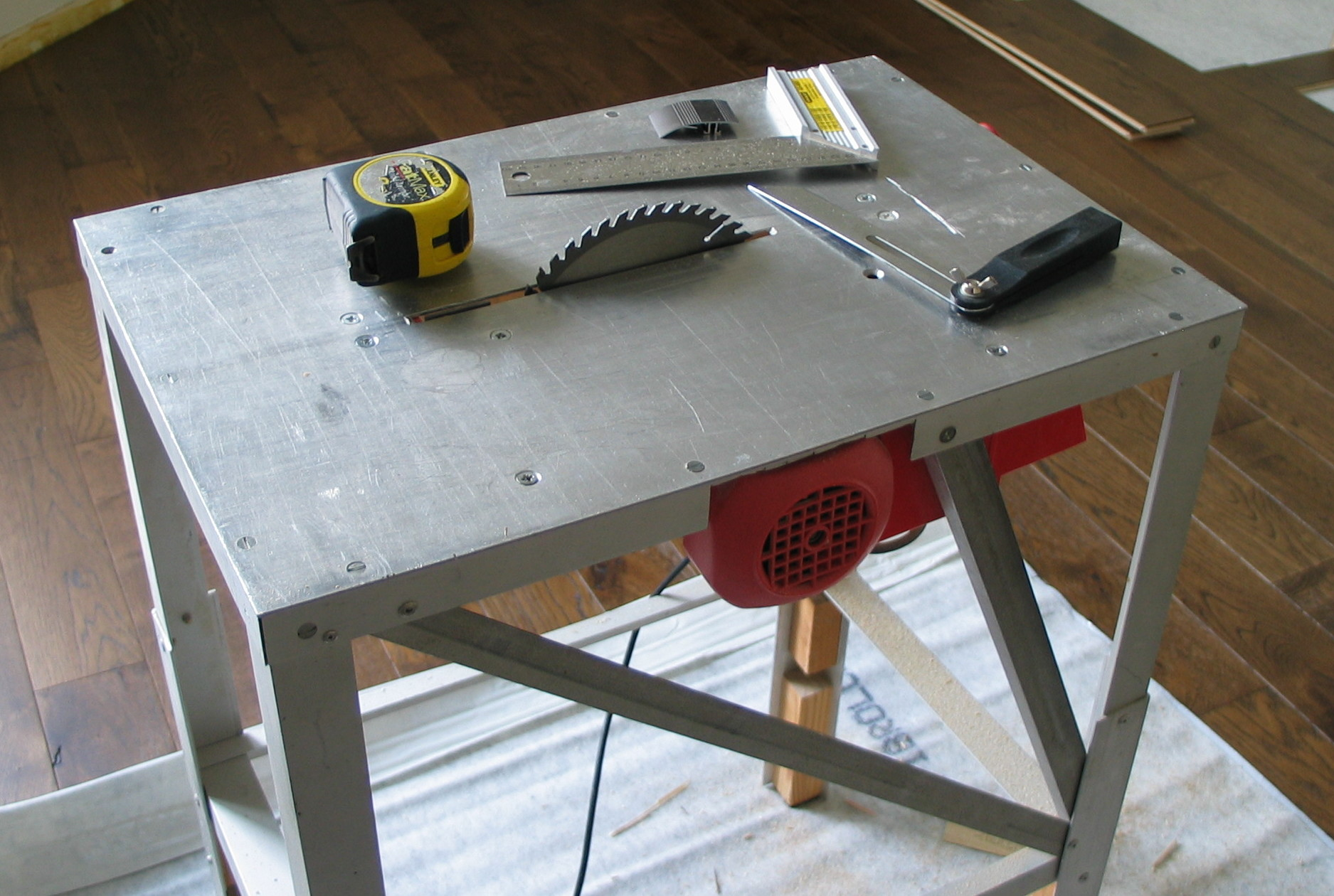
A table saw.

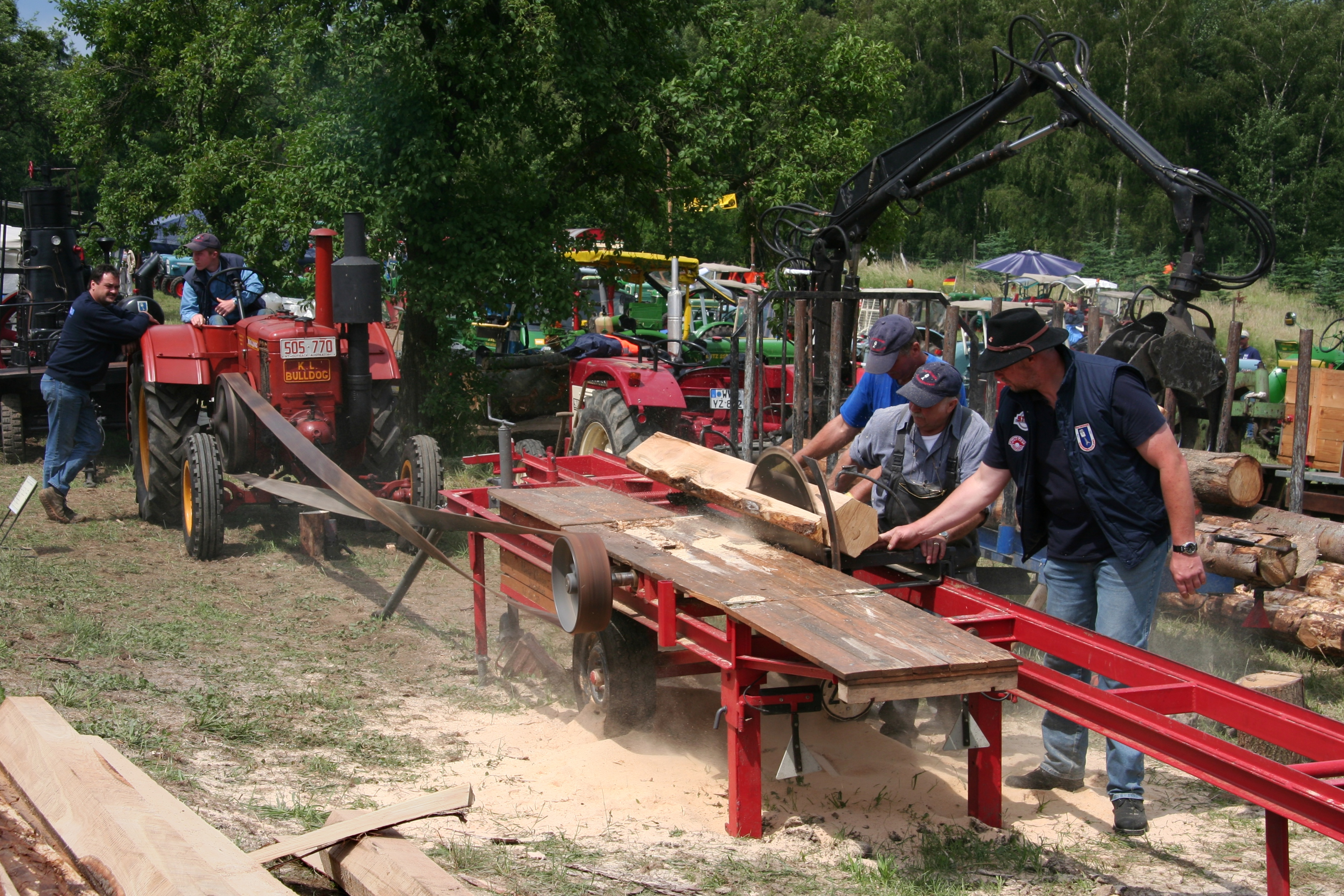
Tractor-driven circular saw

A circular saw or buzz saw is a power-saw using a toothed or abrasive disc or blade to cut different materials using a rotary motion spinning around an arbor. A hole saw and ring saw also use a rotary motion but are different from a circular saw. Circular saw may also be loosely used for the blade itself. Circular saws were invented in the late 18th century and were in common use in sawmills in the United States by the middle of the 19th century.

A circular saw is a tool for cutting many materials such as wood, masonry, plastic, or metal and may be hand-held or mounted to a machine. In woodworking the term circular saw refers specifically to the hand-held type and the table saw and chop saw are other common forms of circular saws. Skilsaw and Skil saw have become generic trademarks for conventional hand-held circular saws in the United States. Circular saw blades are specially designed for each particular material they are intended to cut and in cutting wood are specifically designed for making rip-cuts, cross-cuts, or a combination of both. Circular saws are commonly powered by electricity, but may be powered by a gasoline engine or a hydraulic motor which allows it to be fastened to heavy equipment, eliminating the need for a separate energy source.

== History ==
There is evidence for the prehistorical use of circular saws by people of Indus Valley Civilization during the Bronze Age. The same was excavated from the archeological site of Lothal, Gujarat.

The modern-day circular saw was invented around the end of the 18th century as a rip-saw to convert logs into lumber in sawmills, and various claims have been made as to who invented it. Before the design was invented, logs were sawn by hand using a pit saw or using powered saws in a sawmill using an up-and-down saw with a reciprocating motion. The rotary nature of the circular saw requires more power to operate but cuts faster because the teeth are in constant motion. The sound of the circular saw is different from the sound of an up-and-down saw and earned it the nickname buzz-saw.

Sawmills first used smaller diameter circular saws to resaw dimension lumber such as lath and wall studs and for edging boards. As the technology advanced large diameter saw blades began to be used for the head saws and to cut clapboards.

Claims to the invention of the circular saw include:

- A common claim is for a little-known sailmaker named Samuel Miller of Southampton, England, who obtained a patent in 1777 for a saw windmill. However, the specification for this only mentions the form of the saw incidentally, indicating that it was probably not his invention.
- Gervinus of Germany is often credited with inventing the circular saw in 1780.
- Walter Taylor of Southampton had the blockmaking contract for Portsmouth Dockyard. In about 1762, he built a saw mill where he roughed out the blocks. This was replaced by another mill in 1781. Descriptions of his machinery there in the 1790s show that he had circular saws. Taylor patented two other improvements to blockmaking but not the circular saw. This suggests either that he did not invent it or that he published his invention without patenting it (which would mean it was no longer patentable).
- Another claim is that it originated in the Netherlands in the sixteenth or seventeenth century.
- The use of a large circular saw in a saw mill is said to have been invented in 1813 by Tabitha Babbitt, a Shaker inventor, after she noted, while using her spinning wheel, the inefficiency of the traditional saw pits used by the sawyers in her community and sought an improvement. This claim is now mostly discredited.
- It is also said that Joseph Whitaker, Naturalist amassed the circular saw and had it manufactured in the Barringer, Manners and Wallis factory in Rock Valley, Mansfield, Nottinghamshire.

== Process ==
Typically, the material to be cut is securely clamped or held in a vise, and the saw is advanced slowly across it. In variants such as the table saw, the saw is fixed and the material to be cut is slowly moved into the saw blade. As each tooth in the blade strikes the material, it makes a small chip. The teeth guide the chip out of the workpiece, preventing it from binding the blade.

=== Characteristics ===
- Cutting is by teeth on the edge of a metal blade or by an abrasive wheel
- The cut has narrow kerf and relatively smooth surface finish
- Cuts are straight and relatively accurate
- The saw usually leaves burrs on the cut edge of metal and plastic (which should then be addressed with sand paper)
- Saw setting should be done geometrically

== Types of circular saws ==
In addition to hand-held circular saws (see below), different saws that use circular saw blades include:

- Abrasive saw
- Beam Saw
- Biscuit joiner
- Brushcutter
- Carbide saws
- Cold saw
- Concrete saw
- Flip over saw (the combination of a compound miter and table saw)
- Miter saw (chop saw, cut-off saw)
- Multi-tool (powertool)
- Panel saw
- Pendulum saw or swing saw
- Radial arm saw
- Sally saw
- Swingblade sawmill
- Table saw
- Track saw or plunge saw

== Sawmill blades ==
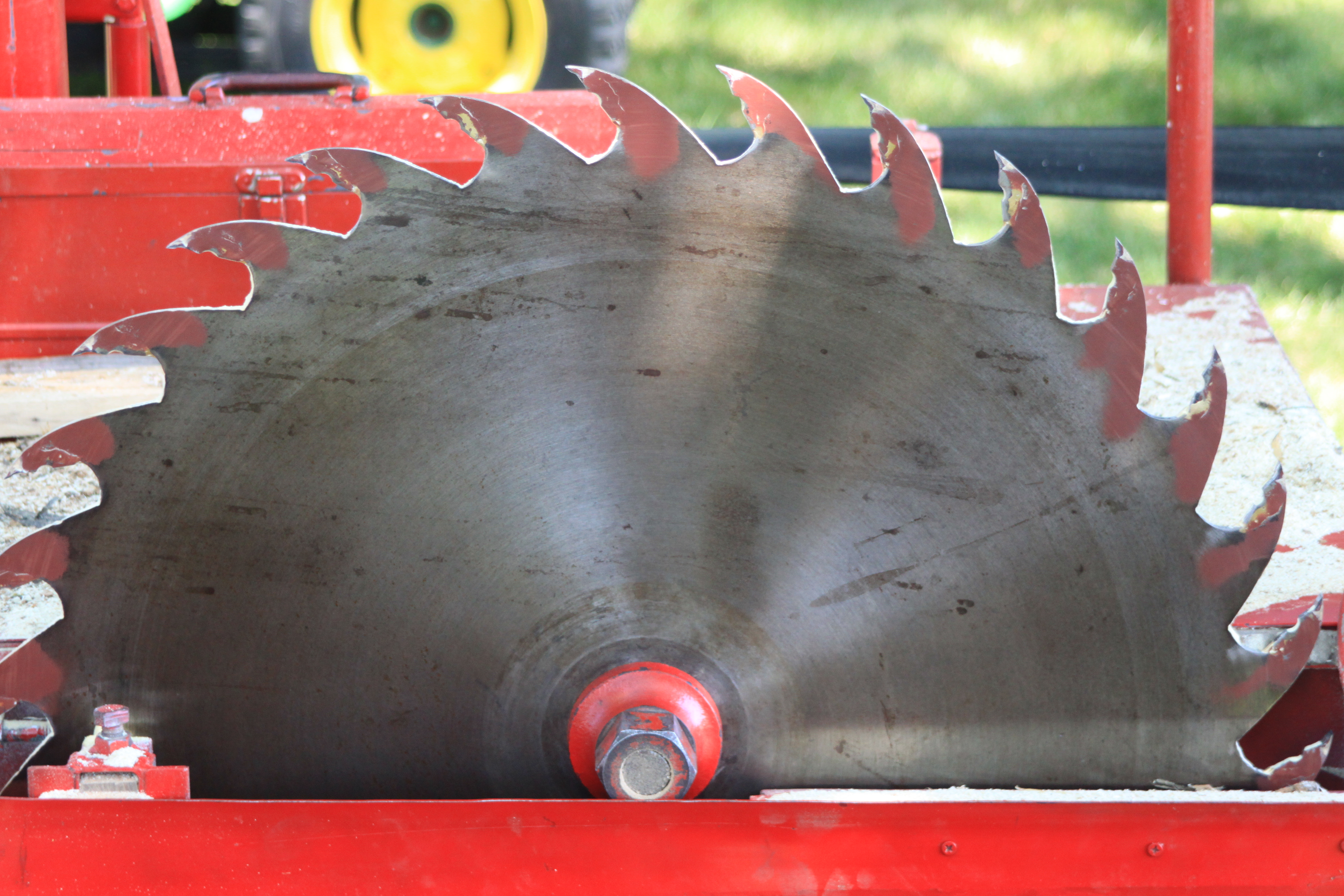
Portable sawmill circular saw blade about 60 cm (2.0 ft) diameter.

Originally, circular saws in mills had smaller blades and were used to resaw lumber after it passed through an "up and down" (muley or sash) saw leaving both vertical and circular saw marks on different sides of the same piece. These saws made it more efficient to cut small pieces such as lath. After 1813 or 1822 saw mills use large circular saws, up to 3 metres (9.8 ft) in diameter. Large saws demand more power than up-and-down saws and did not become practical for sawing timbers until they were powered by steam engines. They are either left or right-handed, depending on which side of the blade the plank falls away from. Benching determines which hand the saw is. Saws of this size typically have a shear pin hole, off axis, that breaks if the saw is overloaded and allows the saw to spin free. The most common version is the ITCO (insert tooth cut-off) which has replaceable teeth. Sawmill blades are also used as an alternative to a radial arm saw.

== Cordwood saws ==
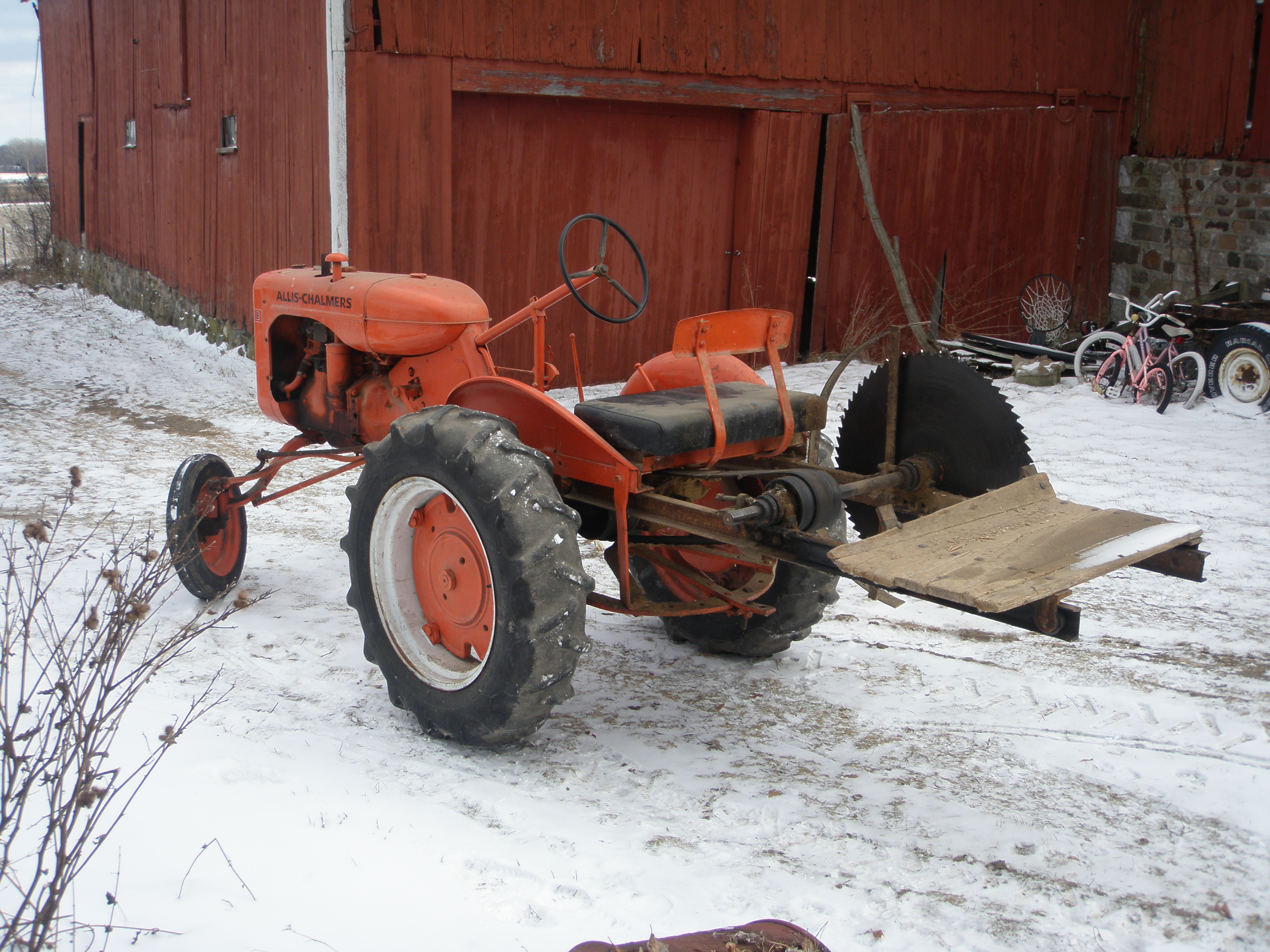
Allis-Chalmers B with a cordwood saw setup

Cordwood saws, also called buzz saws in some locales, use blade of a similar size to sawmills. Where a sawmill rips (cuts with the grain) a cordwood saw crosscuts (cuts across the grain). Cordwood saws can have a blade from 20 inches (510 mm) to more than 36 inches (910 mm) diameter depending on the power source and intended purpose. Cordwood saws are used to cut logs and slabs (sawmill waste) into firewood. The cubic meter and cord (unit) are common measurements of standing timber (by estimation) or rough logs. "Cordwood" means unsplit logs 4 feet (1.2 m) long. In the nineteenth and early twentieth centuries, farmers would supply householders in town with cordwood, which would then be re-sawn and split to a length and circumference suitable for woodburning heaters and ranges. Almost all these devices were designed to accept 16-inch (410 mm) sticks, conveniently a piece of cordwood cut into three equal lengths. Once a piece of cordwood had been re-sawn to three 16-inch pieces, it could easily be split to stovewood size with an ax.

Most cordwood saws consist of a frame, blade, mandrel, cradle, and power source. The cradle is a tilting or sliding guide that holds logs during the cutting process. Certain cordwood saws are run from a belt from a farm tractor power takeoff pulley. Others, mounted on a tractor's three-point hitch, connect to the rear power takeoff shaft. Self-powered models are equipped with small gasoline engines or even large electric motors as power sources. The mandrel is a shaft and set of bearings that support and transfer power to the blade. The frame is a structure that supports the cradle and blade at a convenient working height.

Cordwood saws were once very popular in rural America. They were used to cut smaller wood into firewood in an era when hand powered saws were the only other option. Logs too large for a cordwood saw were still cut by hand. Chainsaws have largely replaced cordwood saws for firewood preparation today. Still, some commercial firewood processors and others use cordwood saws to save wear and tear on their chainsaws. Most people consider cordwood saws unsafe and outdated technology.

== Hand-held circular saws for wood ==
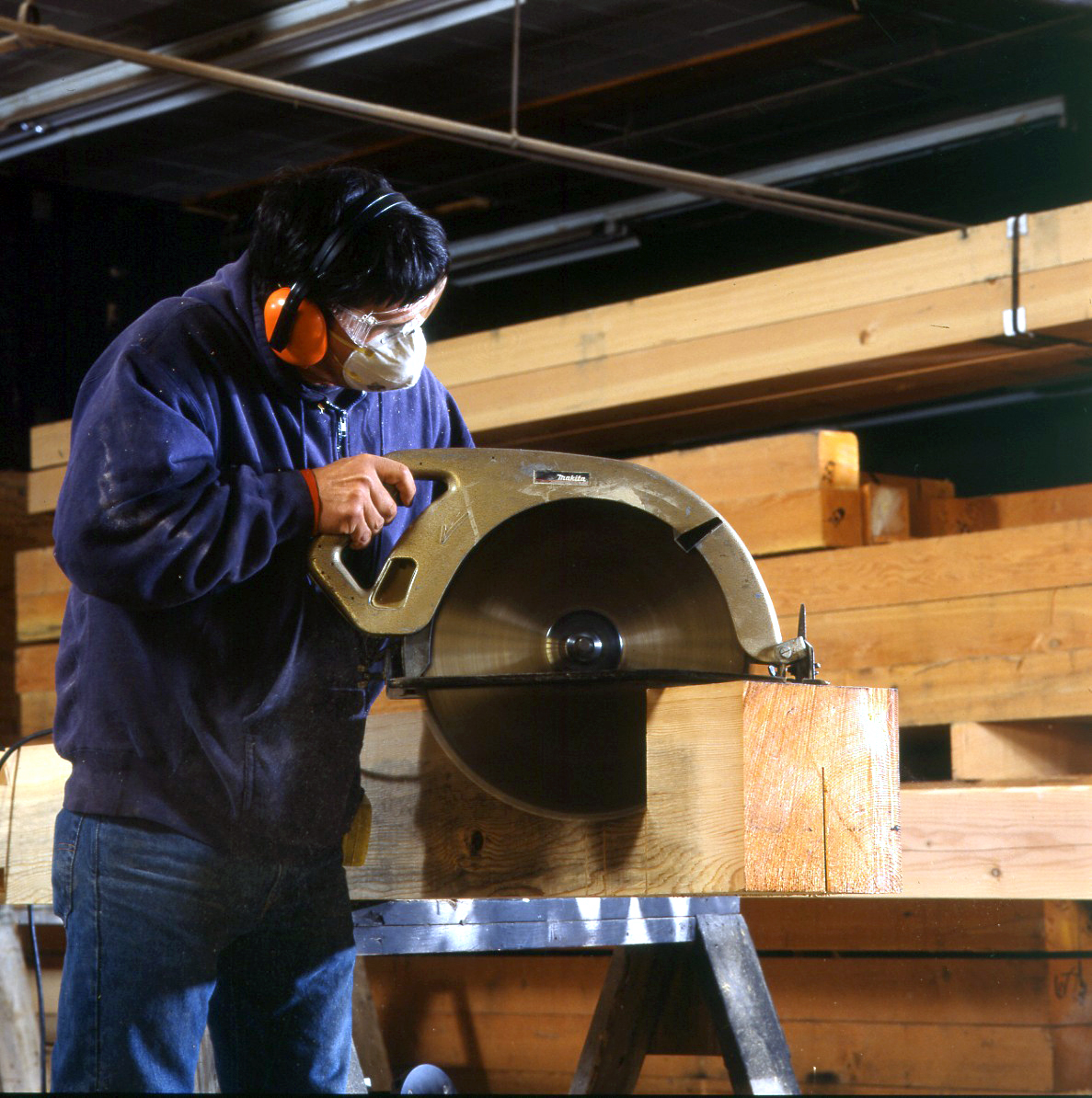
An unusually large hand-held circular saw for cutting timbers with a roughly 16 in (410 mm) blade.

In woodworking the term circular saw is most commonly used to refer to a hand-held, electric circular saw designed for cutting wood, but may be used for cutting other materials with different blades. Circular saws can be either left or right-handed, depending on the side of the blade where the motor sits. A left-handed saw is typically easier to use if held in the right hand, and contrariwise for the right-handed saw, because the user does not need to lean across the saw to see the cutting line.

Blades for cutting wood are almost universally tungsten carbide tipped (TCT), but high-speed steel (HSS) blades are also available. The saw base can be adjusted for depth of cut and can tilt up to 45° and sometimes 50° in relation to the blade. Adjusting the depth of cut helps minimize kickback. Different diameter blades are matched to each saw and are available ranging from 14 to 61 centimetres (5.5–24.0 in).

Saws can have two different types of linkages between the motor and the blade. In the type known colloquially as a sidewinder, the blade is mounted directly on the motor's driveshaft. In a worm-drive saw, the blade is driven by a perpendicularly mounted motor using worm gears, which give higher torque.

The worm-drive portable circular saw was invented in 1923 by Edmond Michel. In 1924 Michel formed a partnership with Joseph Sullivan, and together they started the Michel Electric Handsaw Company, with the sole purpose of manufacturing and marketing the saw invented by Michel. The company later renamed itself Skilsaw Inc. Portable circular saws are often still called Skilsaws or Skil saws. Its successor is still sold by Skil as the model 77. To get around the Skilsaw patents, Art Emmons of Porter-Cable invented the direct-drive sidewinder saw in 1928. Since the 2010s smaller cordless circular saws with rechargeable batteries have become popular.

== Cold saw for metal ==
Cold saw machines are circular saws that are used in many metal cutting operations. The saw blades used are quite large in diameter and operate at low rotational speeds, and linear feeds. There are three common types of blades used in circular saws; solid-tooth, segmental tooth, and the carbide inserted-tooth. The circular saw is typically fed into the workpiece horizontally, and as the saw advances into the material, it severs the material by producing narrow slots. The material is usually held in place during the cutting operation by means of a vise. The chips produced by cutting are carried away from the material by both the teeth of the blade as well as the coolant or other cutting fluid used.

== Abrasive saws ==
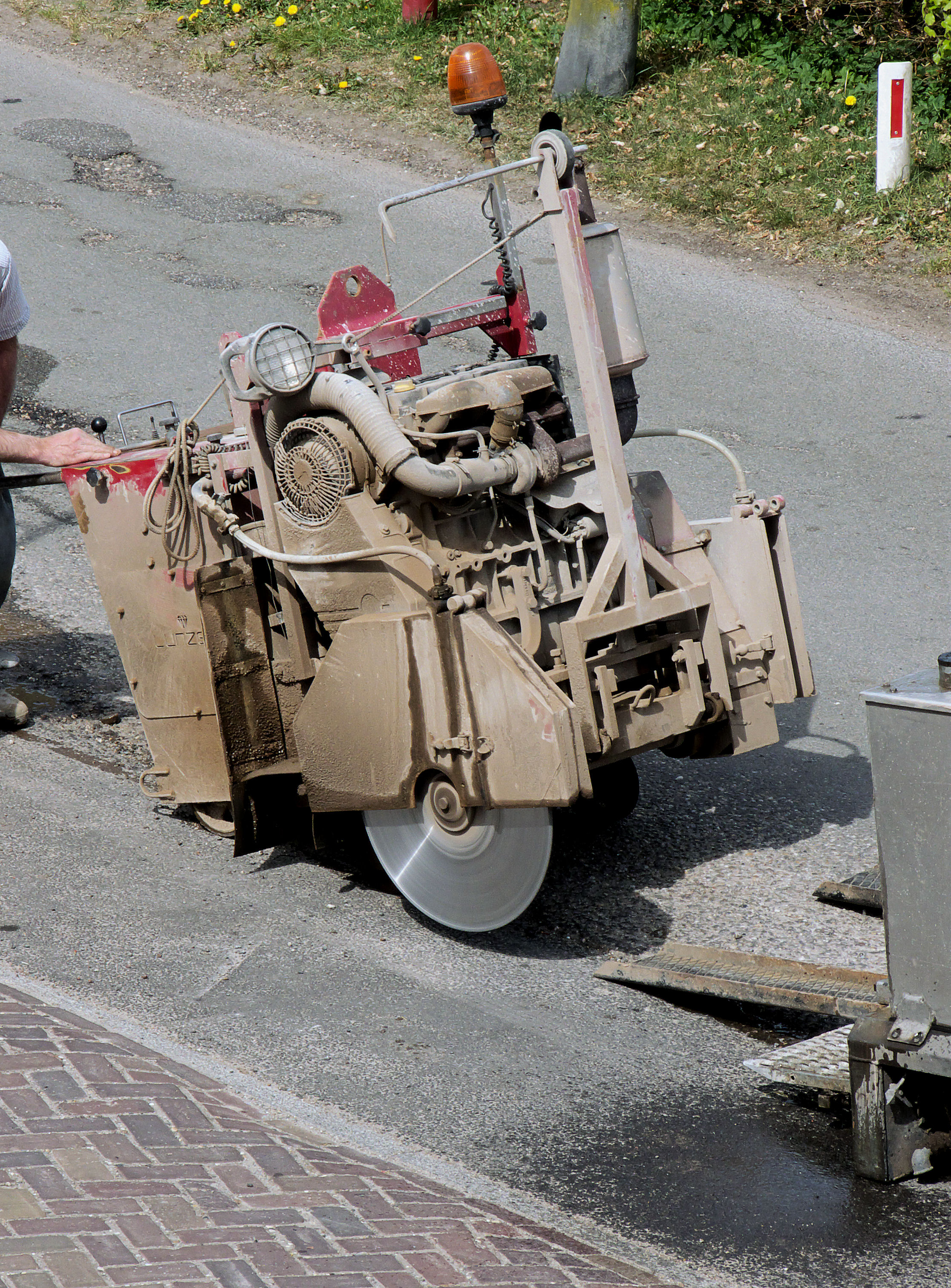
Circular saw with a diamond blade for cutting asphalt and concrete.

The rotary motion of a circular saw lends itself to cutting hard materials like concrete, asphalt, metal, tile, brick, and stone with an abrasive saw such as a tile saw. Diamond blades and cut off wheels are commonly used in these applications.

== See also ==
- Band saw
- Dado set
- Hewing
- Saw pit
- Water mill
- Wood splitting
