= Cummings Machine Works =

Cummings Machine Works was a Boston, Massachusetts based business. It was founded by Henry Havelock Cummings in 1881, when Cummings was 23 years old. The company was awarded a United States Defense Department contract to manufacture fixtures in March 1941. The contract amounted to $17,893. The company was among the firms which contributed to the building of the Boston Opera House, completed in 1909, supplying steelworks used in the construction of the stage.

Cummings Machine Works has been credited with the development of the sally saw. A patent filed in 1945, and assigned to the company, describes a saw with a circular blade. The blade could be rotated between horizontal and vertical, thus allowing a tree to be felled, limbed, and bucked with one saw. Other inventions included a hydraulic hospital bed, automatic doughnut machine, teardrop vehicle and Hookups.

The last owners were Robert M. Mustard Sr., president, and Lewis W. Mustard, treasurer. The last known address was 10 Melcher Street in Boston. It went out of business in 1958.
