= Sally saw =

Portable tool

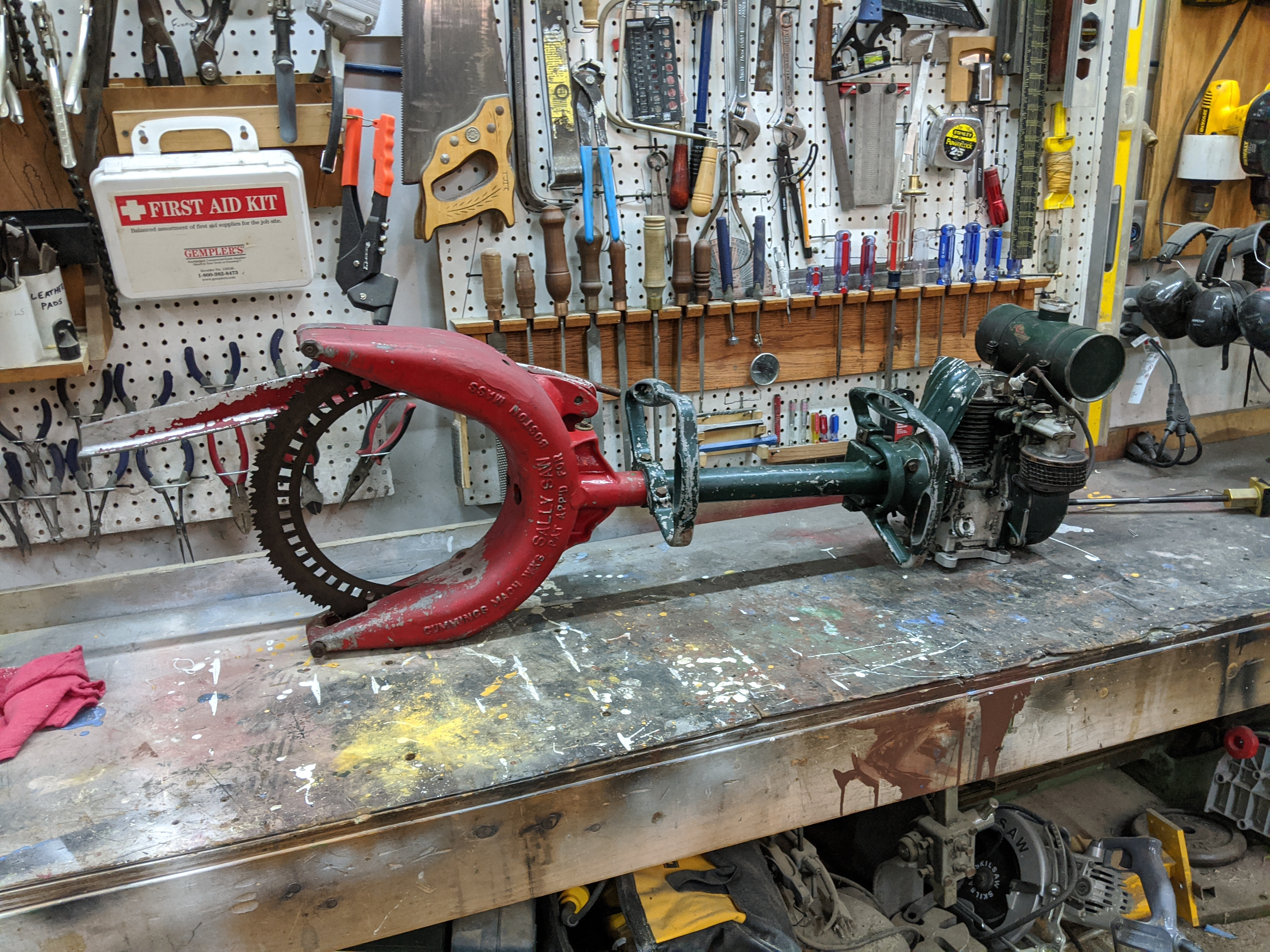
Sally Saw

A sally saw is a portable, motorized saw created by the Cummings Machine Works in 1945 for limbing and bucking trees. A sally saw comprises an engine, an annular saw blade driven by a gear adjacent to the rim, and a drive shaft. Like a String trimmer or Motorized Pole Saw, the drive shaft runs through a tube, which serves as the frame and grip area.
