= Allis-Chalmers Model B =

Utility tractor

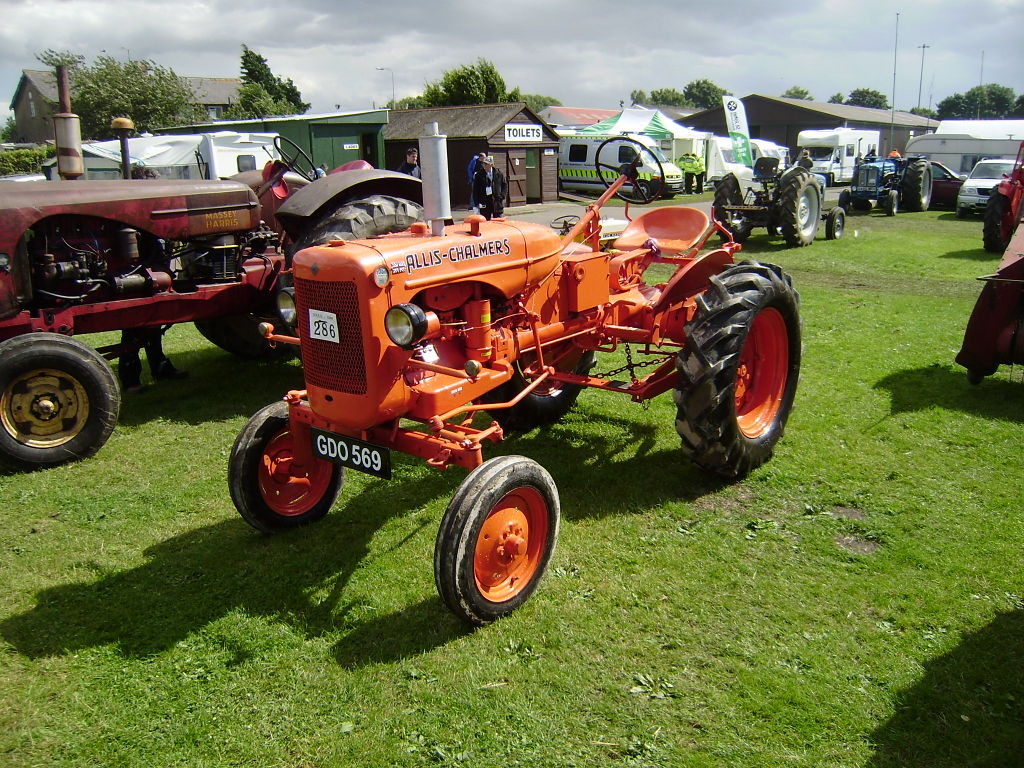
- An Allis-Chalmers Model B at a UK steam show
- Type: Row-crop agricultural tractor
- Manufacturer: Allis-Chalmers
- Production: 1938-1958
- Length: 110.25 in (280.0 cm)
- Height: 76.75 in (194.9 cm)
- Weight: 4,173 pounds (1,893 kg) (ballasted)
- Propulsion: Rear wheels
- Engine model: Allis-Chalmers CE and BE (main production)
- Gross power: 17 horsepower (13 kW)
- PTO power: 22.5 horsepower (16.8 kW) (belt)
- Drawbar power: 12.97 horsepower (9.67 kW)
- Drawbar pull: 1,473 pounds (668 kg)
- NTTL test: 302
- Succeeded by: Allis-Chalmers Model D10

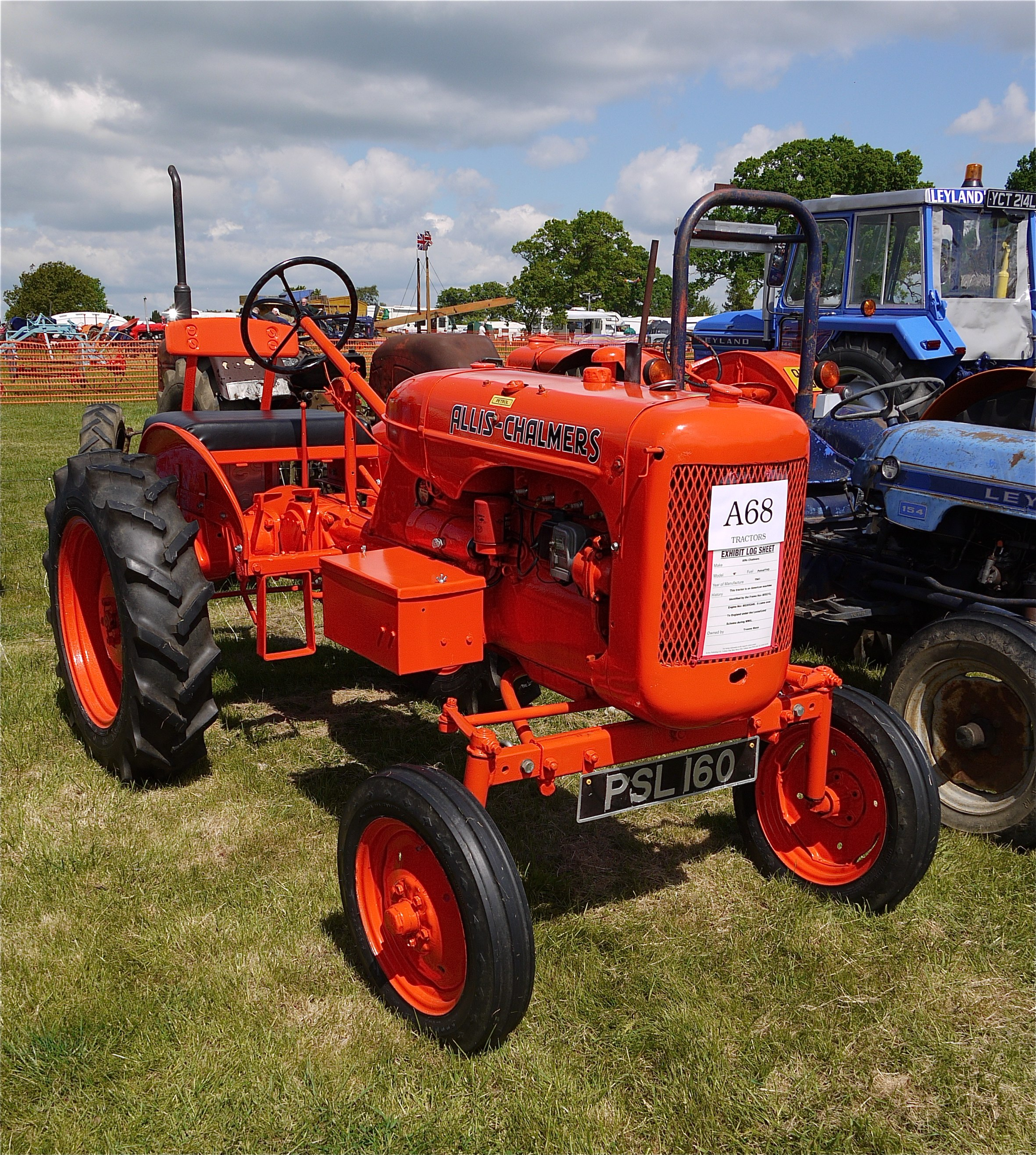
1941 Model B.

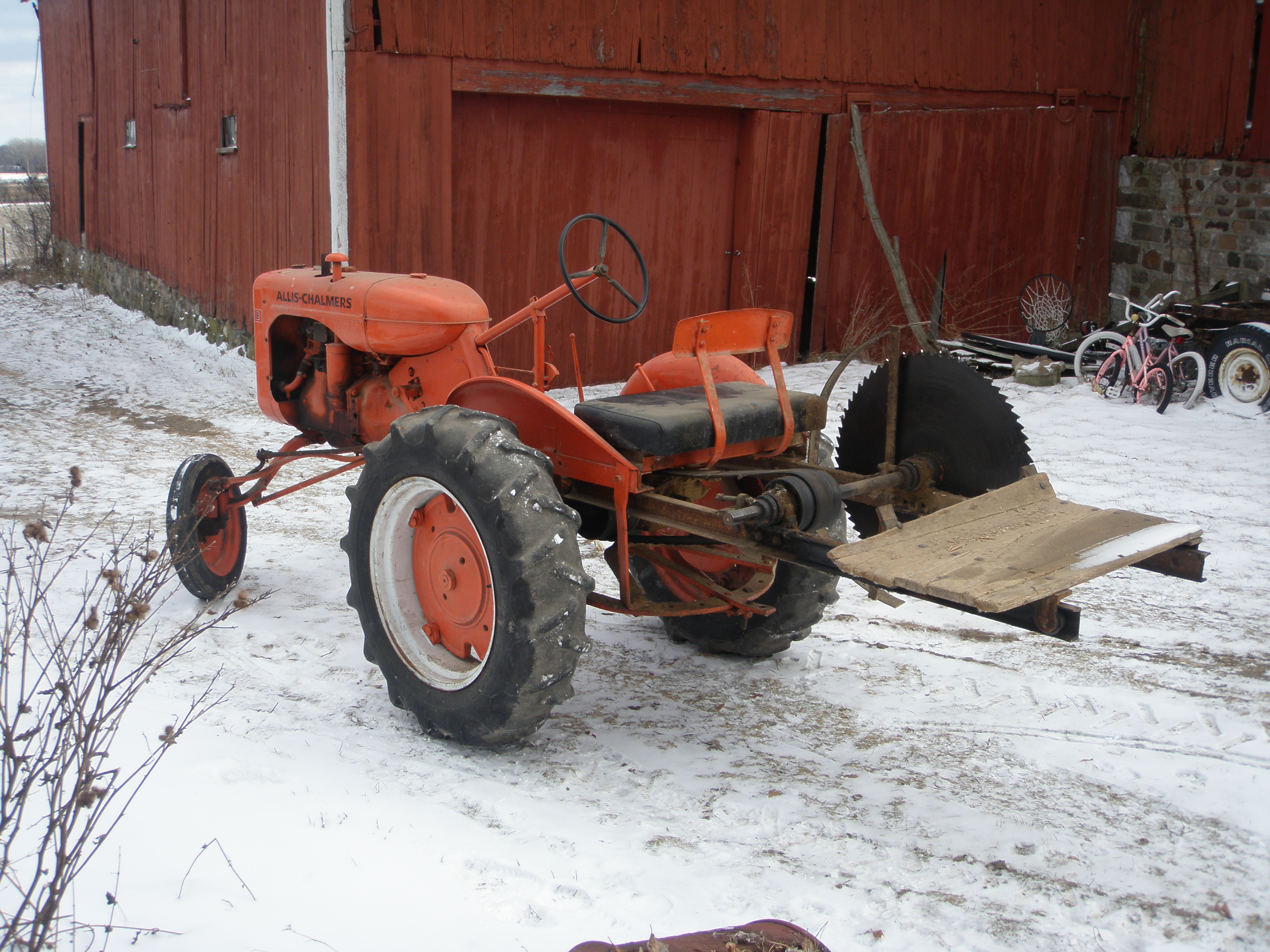
A Model B with a sawmill-style buzz saw.

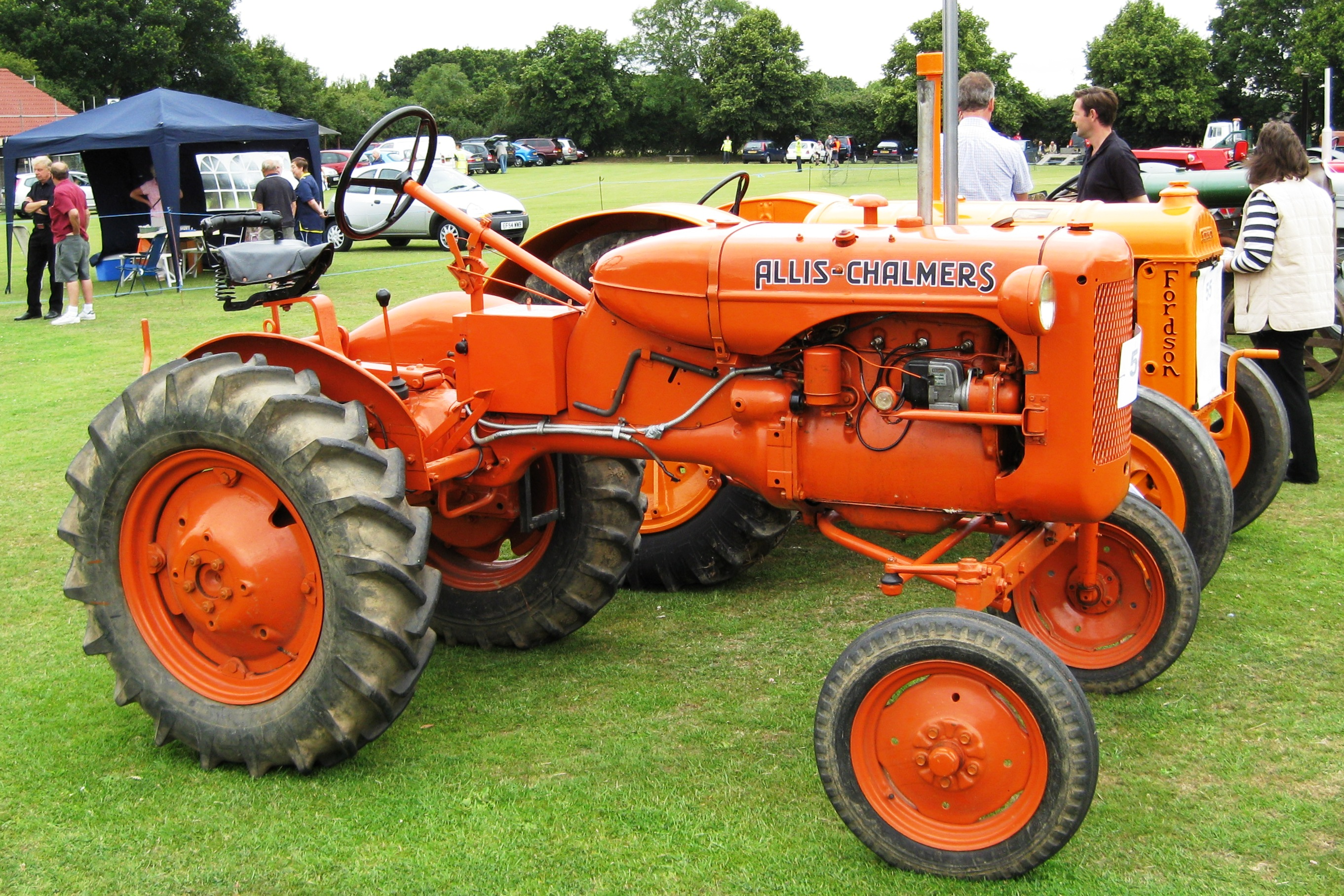
Another Model B, with a Fordson behind it.

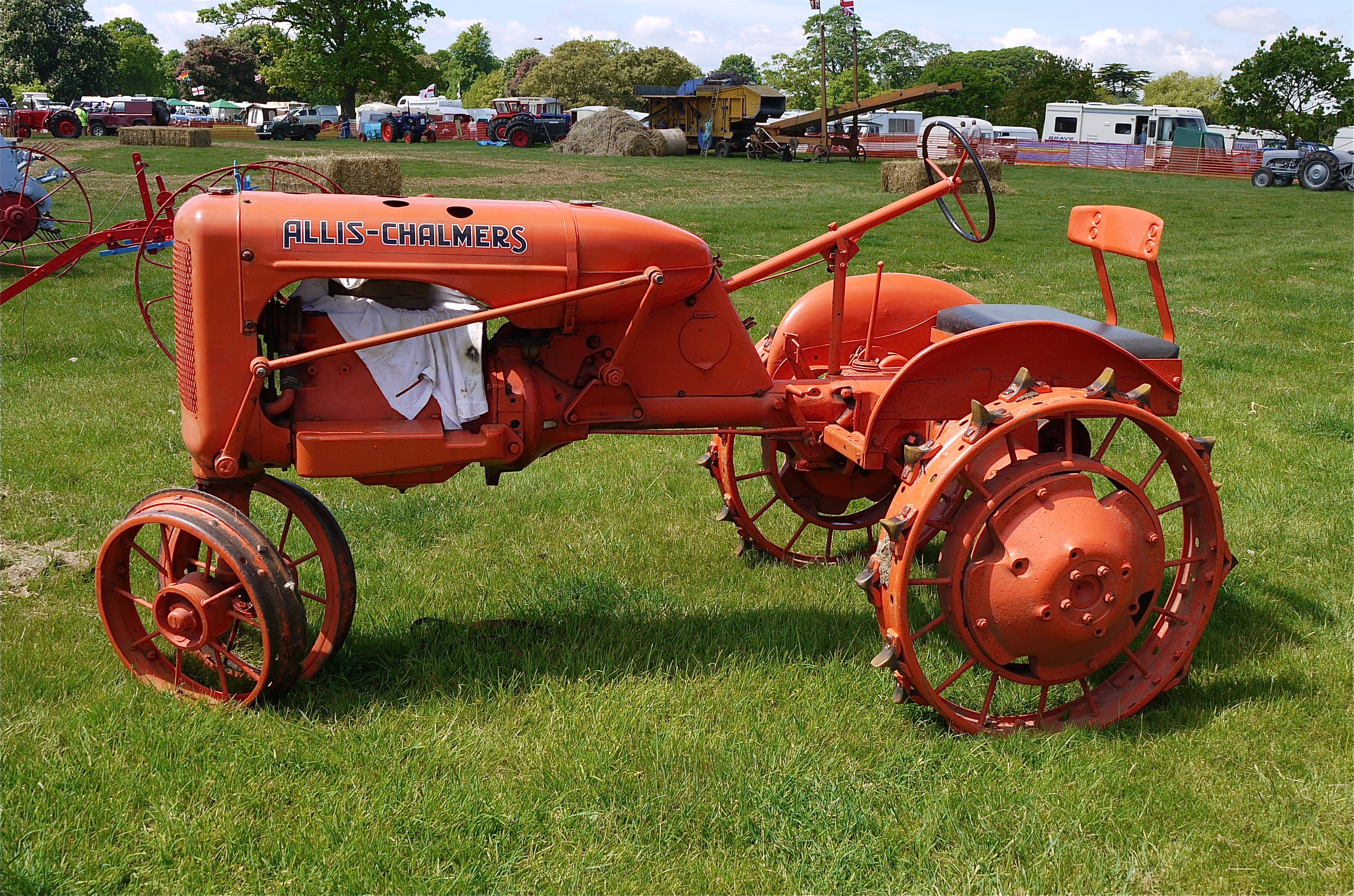
A Model B on steel—optional equipment that lowered the price. Most Bs were sold on rubber.

The Allis-Chalmers model B was a small agricultural tractor produced by the Allis-Chalmers manufacturing company from 1937 to 1957. With over 125,000 units produced, the model B became one of the best selling and longest-produced tractors for Allis-Chalmers. The B came in several different variations including the Asparagus B, Potato Special, and the IB industrial tractor, and gave rise to the larger Allis-Chalmers Model C. The Model B was styled by Brooks Stevens, an industrial designer and graphic designer.

== Description and production ==
In the early 1930s, Allis-Chalmers tractor division manager Harry Merritt's study of farm census figures showed that-they have a lot of potential in the field and even in the yard, of the nearly seven million farms in America, some four million were of 100 acres (0.40 km^{2}) or less. Furthermore, the million or so tractors used on American farms were generally unsuitably large for such acreage. Although the Fordson tractor and then the first-generation row-crop tractors, including the Farmall, Allis-Chalmers's own Model WC, and others, had been gaining significant market penetration and making mechanised agriculture ever more popular, Merritt concluded that there was a need for four million small, inexpensive tractors to fill the needs of the small farmers still using horses.

In common with other tractors of the time, the Model B received a styled body, designed by industrial designer Brooks Stevens.

The Model B was initially powered by a Waukesha 113-cubic-inch (1,850 cc) four-cylinder engine, then from 1938 by an Allis-Chalmers 116.1-cubic-inch (1,903 cc) engine. This was increased to 125.2 cubic inches (2,052 cc) in 1943, all with three-speed transmissions. The Model B was adapted for a variety of specialty crops, with variants including a high-clearance Asparagus Special and a narrow-track Potato Special. As a row-crop tractor the rear and wide front axles were adjustable. A standard tractor version, the IB, with fixed axles, was produced as an industrial tractor, often used as a mower.

A total of 120,783 Model Bs were built at Allis-Chalmers factories in West Allis, Wisconsin and in Southampton, England. Selling price in 1958 was about $1,500.

== Model RC ==
The Model RC was adapted from the Allis-Chalmers Model WC as a two-plow row-crop tractor using Model B components. It was an expensive stopgap, and in 1939 the more powerful Allis-Chalmers Model C was introduced, based on the Model B, as a more efficient upgrade.

== See also ==
- List of Allis-Chalmers tractors
- List of tractor manufacturers
