= Ring saw =

Bandsaw with a rigid circular blade

A ring saw is a form of bandsaw where the band is rigid, rather than flexible. This requires the band to be circular, rather than the bandsaw's usual oblong of straight runs between two (or three) guide wheels.

Ringsaw blades are abrasive rather than toothed. The brittleness of this abrasive coating, and the need to avoid flexure, is why they are made as rings rather than oval bands. As the ring is a circle of constant radius, the blade is not flexed or bent in operation. The blades themselves are not usually rigid and may be bent slightly in fitting, but are not designed to be flexed as they rotate.

Abrasive sawblades, as used in ringsaws, are mostly used in the working of art glass. They use a steel band or ring, coated with a diamond abrasive, attached by nickel electroplating. Abrasive saws are used for a range of hard, brittle materials, such as in mineralogy. Ceramic tiles may also be sawn.

The main form of ring saw uses a ring or wire that is like a flat disk. The non-cutting side of the blade is behind the cutting edge, so limits the depth of the cuts that may be made. (Note: This differs from the bandsaw, where the other part of the band is alongside the cutting edge, thus limits the width of cuts that may be made.) Wire-saws are coated with an abrasive on all sides and so may cut in any direction. With the ring behind the cutting edge, cuts in the main direction will treat the blade (in mechanical terms) as an arch, which is stiffer than a sideways force on a cylindrical blade. This geometry also gives a vertical cut in thick materials, although the cut must be kept straight and unlike a bandsaw, curves cannot be sawn if the material is thick. They may be used for mineralogy and slabbing.

Many makers of ringsaws offer a similar blade as a bandsaw too. The ringsaw blade in comparison may be made rigid, thus stronger and less flexible under cutting loads, giving a more accurate cut. Some make a particular feature of the ring saw's ability to cut forwards, backwards and sideways. As the bandsaw blade must be flexible enough to pass around the wheels, its blades are limited to cutting on the forward edge. The oblong bandsaw has a blade that is supported on two large wheels. (Note: The three-wheel bandsaw instead uses three small wheels. These offer limited contact and so suffer from many of the same problems as a ring saw.) The interval between the two wheels is supported by blade guides immediately behind the cutting zone. Ring saws do not have the same straight run of blade, nor the opportunity to support much of the blade as with the wheels of a bandsaw. A ring saw is thus a somewhat fragile machine and excess pressure on a thin blade is likely to damage it.

Abrasive saws are often water-cooled and most ring saws are designed to enable this, with water pumps or drip feeds, and catch trays.

== Concrete ring saws ==
Concrete and masonry-cutting 'ring' saws are a form of disk cutter and are unrelated to bandsaws. They do however also use a diamond abrasive.
