= Cold saw =

Type of circular saw

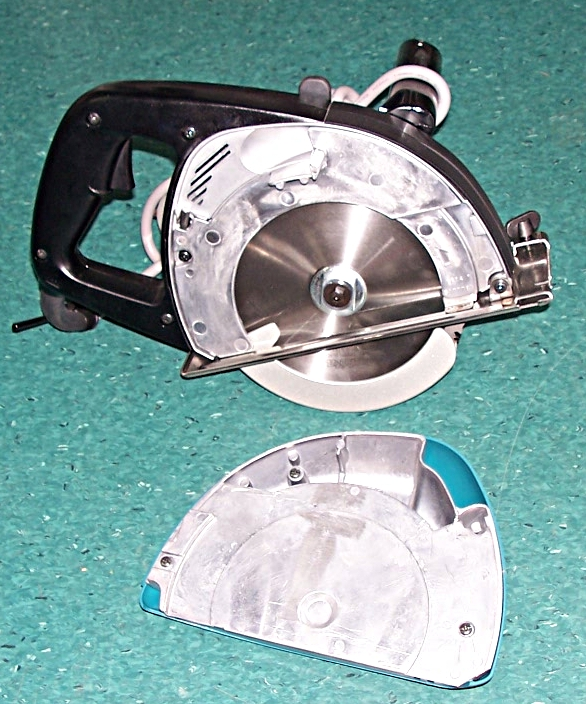
Portable cold saw with the chip catcher detached

A cold saw is a circular saw designed to cut metal which uses a toothed blade to transfer the heat generated by cutting to the chips created by the saw blade, allowing both the blade and material being cut to remain cool. This is in contrast to an abrasive saw, which abrades the metal and generates a great deal of heat absorbed by the material being cut and saw blade.

As metals expand when heated, abrasive cutting causes both the material being cut and blade to expand, resulting in increased effort to produce a cut and potential binding. This produces more heat through friction, resulting in increased blade wear and greater energy consumption.

Cold saws use either a solid high-speed steel (HSS) or tungsten carbide-tipped, resharpenable circular saw blade. They are equipped with an electric motor and often a gear reduction unit to reduce the saw blade's rotational speed while maintaining constant torque. This allows the HSS saw blade to feed at a constant rate with a very high chip load per tooth.

Cold saws are capable of machining most ferrous and non-ferrous alloys. Additional advantages include minimal burr production, fewer sparks, less discoloration and no dust. Saws designed to employ a flood coolant system to keep saw blade teeth cooled and lubricated may reduce sparks and discoloration completely. Saw blade type and number of teeth, cutting speed, and feed rate all must be appropriate to the type and size of material being cut, which must be mechanically clamped to prevent movement during the cutting process.

== Blades ==
Cold saw blades are circular metal cutting saw blades categorized into two types: solid HSS or tungsten carbide-tipped (TCT). Both types of blades are resharpenable and may be used many times before being discarded. Cold saw blades are used to cut metal using a relatively slow rotational speed, usually less than 5000 surface feet per minute (SFM) (25 m/s), and a high chip load per tooth, usually between .001"–.003" (0.025–0.08 mm) per tooth. These blades are driven by a high power motor and high-torque gear reduction unit or an AC vector drive. During the cutting process, the metal is released in a shearing action by the teeth as the blade turns and the feed mechanism moves the blade forward. They are called "cold saw blades" because they transfer all the energy and heat created during the cutting process to the chip. This enables the blade and the work material to remain cold.

=== Classification ===
The first type of cold saw blade, solid HSS, may be made from either M2 tool steel or M35 tool steel, alloyed with additional cobalt. Solid HSS saw blades are heat treated and hardened to 64/65 HRC for ferrous cutting applications and 58/60 HRC for non-ferrous cutting applications. This high hardness gives the cutting edges of the teeth a high resistance to heat and wear. However, this increased hardness also makes the blades brittle and not very resistant to shock. In order to produce a high quality HSS cold saw blade, it is necessary to start with very flat and properly tensioned raw material. The blades must be press quenched after hardening to prevent them from being warped. HSS saw blades are typically hollow ground for clearance during the cutting process. The term HSS doesn't necessarily mean what it implies. These blades are usually never run at surface speeds higher than 350 SFM. Solid HSS cold saw blades may be used for cutting many different shapes and types of metal including: tubes, extrusions, structural sections, billets, bars, ingots, castings, forgings etc. These blades may also be coated with special wear resistant coatings such as titanium nitride (TiN) or titanium aluminum nitride (TiAlN), but are more commonly used commercially with a black oxide coating aiding in better coolant distribution over the surface area of the cutting blade.

The second type of cold saw blade, tungsten carbide-tipped (TCT), are made with an alloy steel body and tungsten carbide inserts brazed to the tips of the teeth. These tips are ground on all surfaces to create tangential and radial clearance and provide the proper cutting and clearance angles on the teeth. The alloy body is generally made from a wear-resistant material such as a chrome vanadium steel, heat treated to 38/42 HRC. The tungsten carbide tips are capable of operating at much higher temperatures than solid HSS, therefore, TCT saw blades are usually run at much higher surface speeds. This allows carbide-tipped blades to cut at faster rates and still maintain an acceptable chip load per tooth. These blades are commonly used for cutting non-ferrous alloys, but have gained significant popularity for ferrous metal cutting applications in the last 10 years. The tungsten carbide inserts are extremely hard (98 HRC) and capable of very long wear life. However, they are less resistant to shock than solid HSS cold saw blades. Any vibration during the cutting process may severely damage the teeth. These cold saw blades need to be driven by a backlash free gear box and a constant feed mechanism like a ball-screw feed.

== Portable saws ==
Portable cold saws were primarily designed for sheet metal roofers in the building industry, and can cut up to 6 mm (0.24 in) thick mild steel. Cold saws, as opposed to abrasive saws, are used so that protective coatings are not damaged. They have a heavy duty aluminium catcher which is useful for capturing the swarf, and use cermet tipped blades.
