= Gleaner Manufacturing Company =

American farm equipment company

- Industry: Agricultural Equipment
- Founded: 1923
- Founder: Curtis Baldwin, Ernest Baldwin, George Baldwin
- Successor: Allis-Chalmers, AGCO
- Website: www.gleanercombines.com

The Gleaner Manufacturing Company (aka: Gleaner Combine Harvester Corp.) is an American manufacturer of combine harvesters. Gleaner (or Gleaner Baldwin) has been a popular brand of combine harvester particularly in the Midwestern United States for many decades, first as an independent firm, and later as a division of Allis-Chalmers. The Gleaner brand continues today under the ownership of AGCO.

== History ==
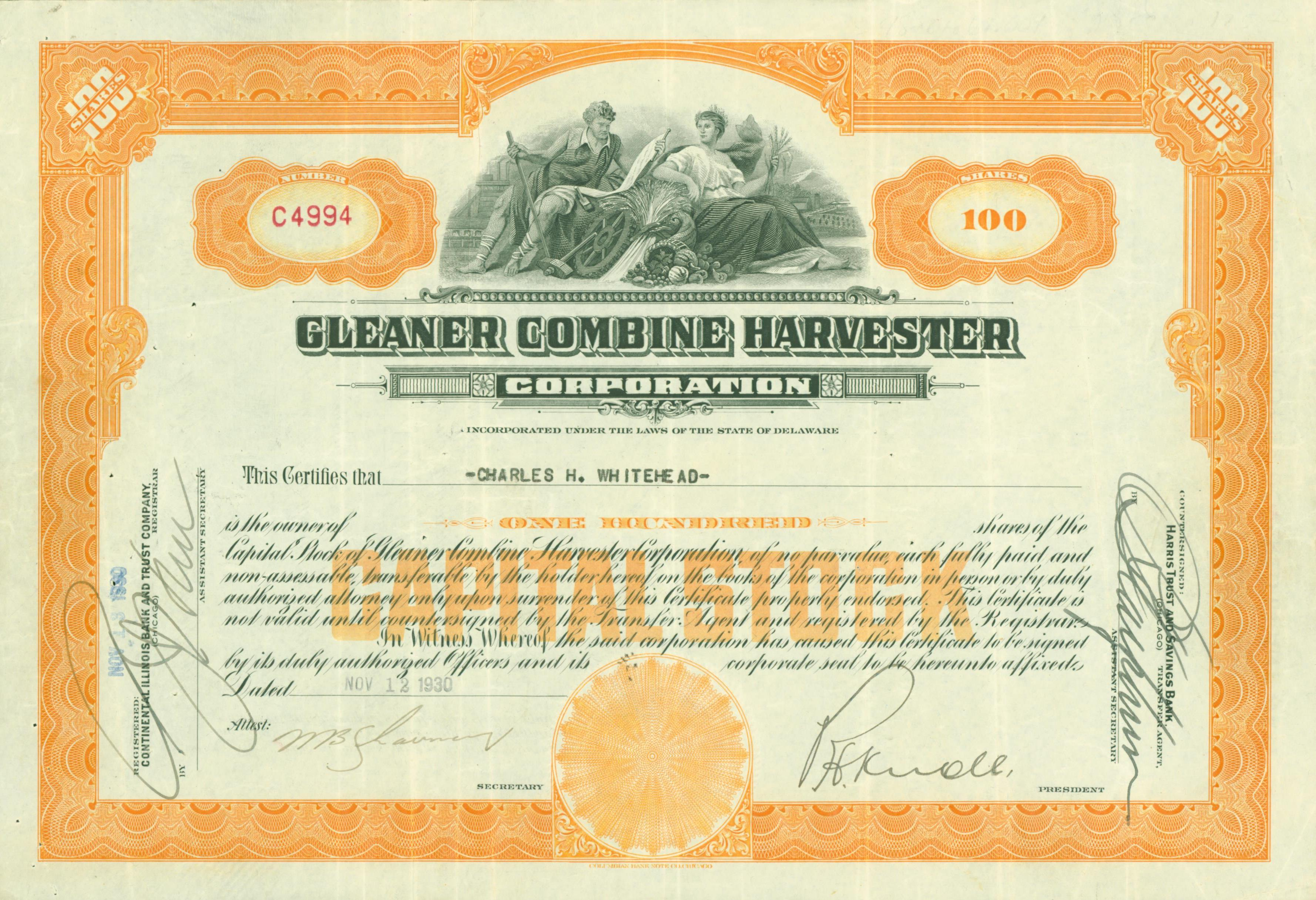
Share of the Gleaner Combine Harvester Corp., issued 12 November 1930

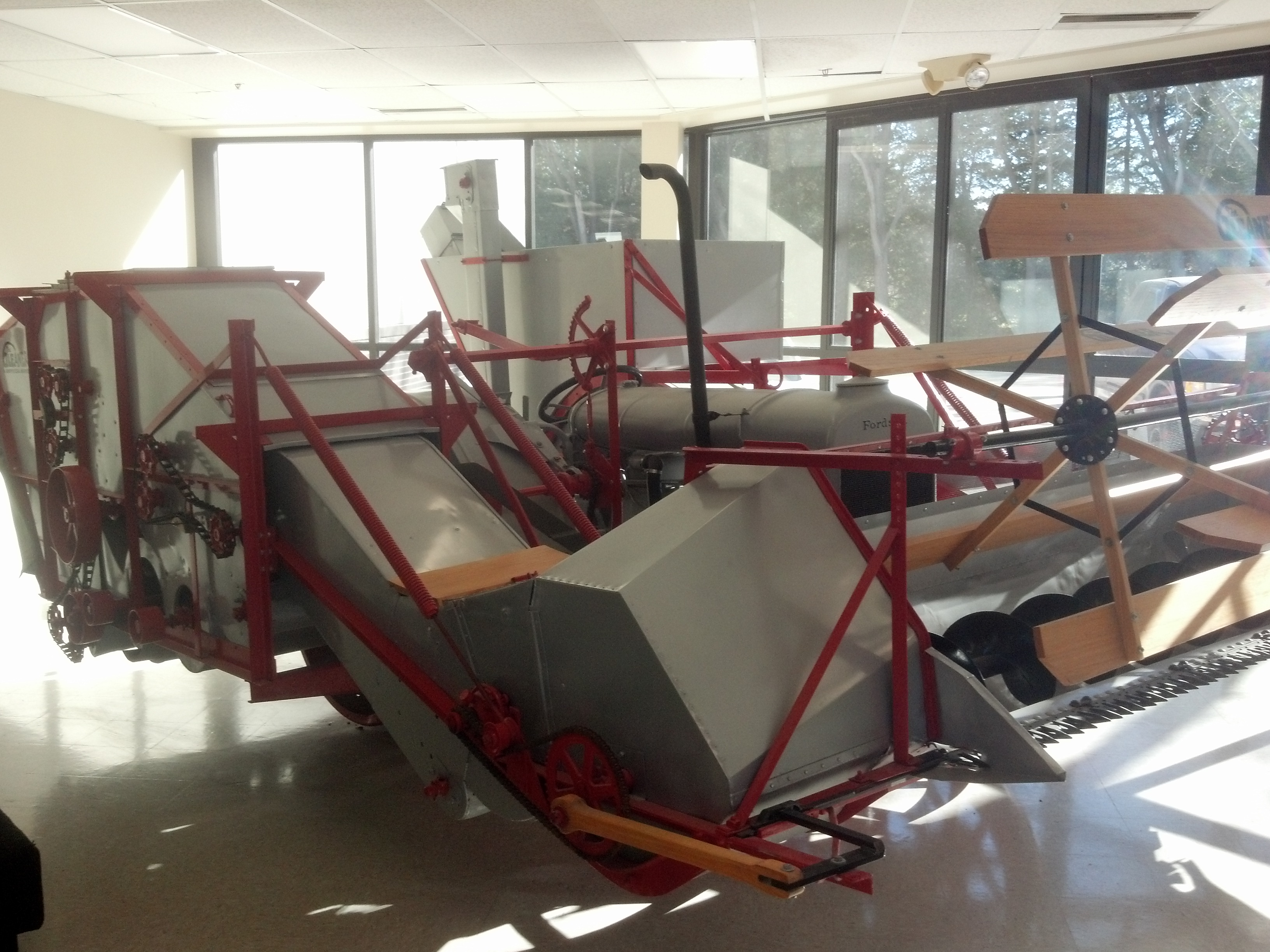
Gleaner Combine, produced between 1922-1927. The tractor on which it is mounted is partially visible.

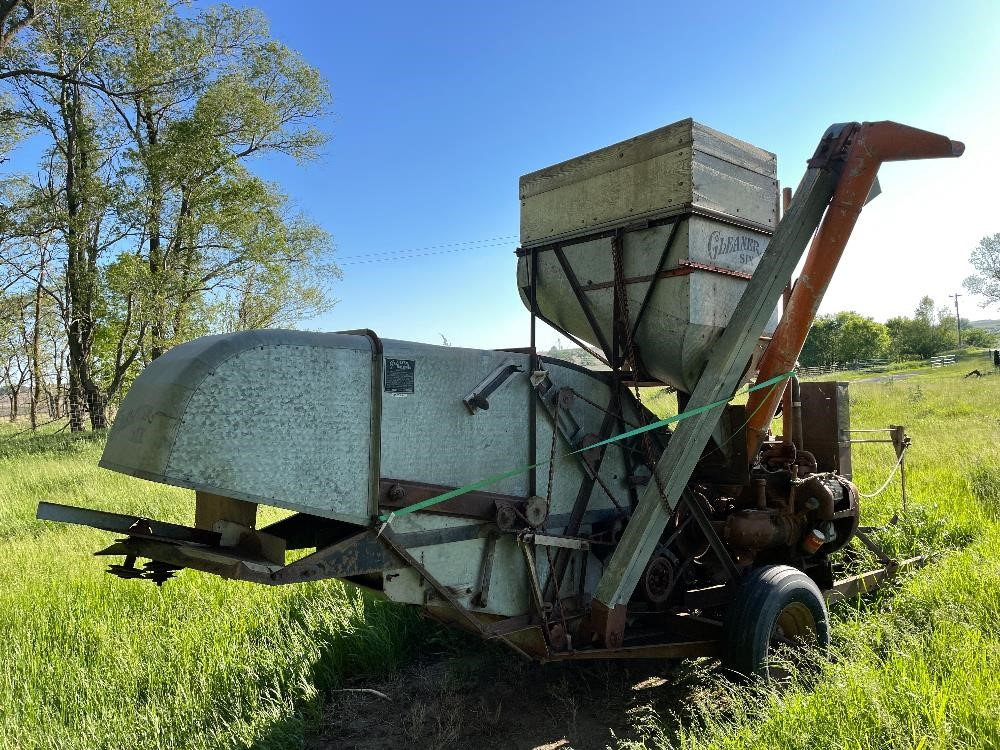
Gleaner Six - S Pull Type Combine

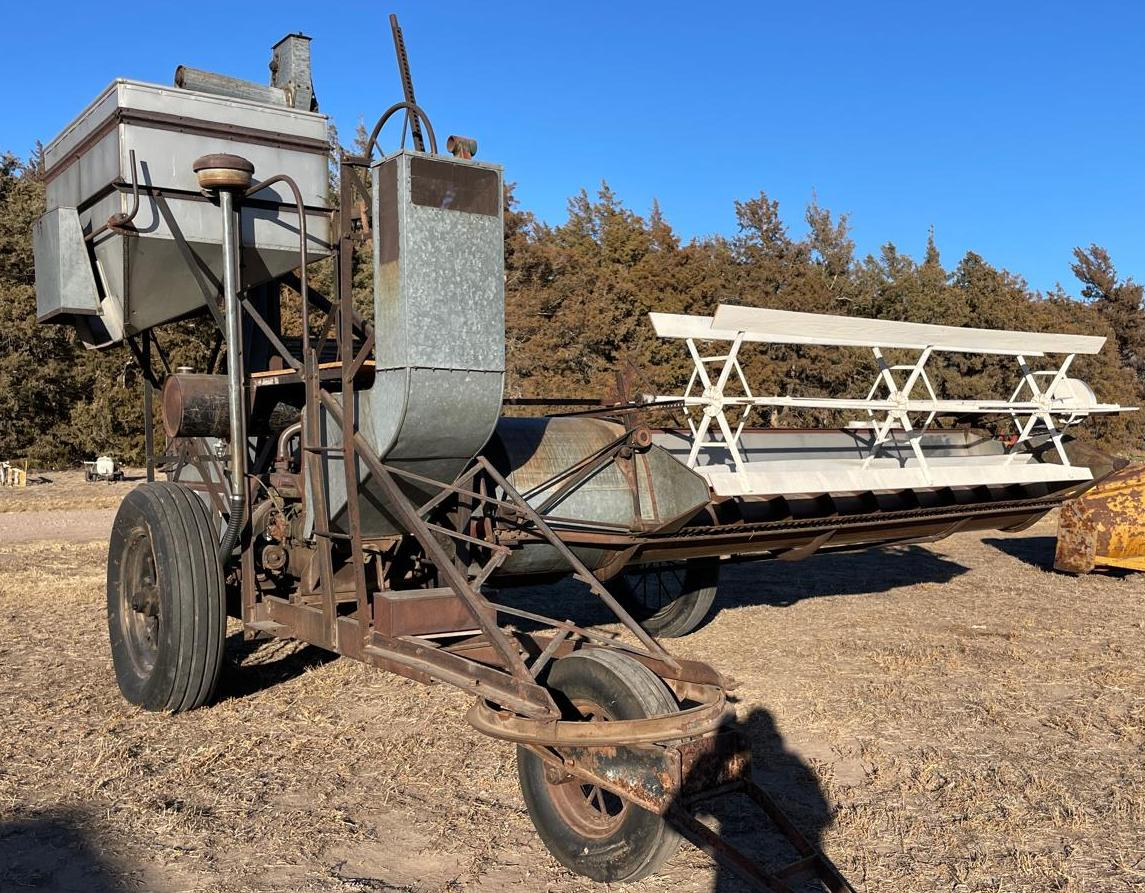
Gleaner Model E Pull-Type Combine

Gleaner combines date from 1923, when the Baldwin brothers of Nickerson, Kansas, created a high-quality and reliable self-propelled combine harvester. They decided to use the "Gleaner" name for their radically redesigned grain harvesting machine based on inspiration from "The Gleaners", an 1857 painting by Jean-François Millet. Gleaning is the act of collecting leftover crops from farm fields after they have been commercially harvested, or on fields where it is not economically profitable to harvest. In the broadest sense, it is the act of frugally recovering resources from low-yield contexts. Thus, with the Gleaner name, the company evoked a positive connotation in potential customers' minds, of a brand of harvester that would leave none of the grain behind. A combine harvester combines the reaping (plus or minus binding), threshing, and winnowing functions into one machine, hence the "combine" part of its name. To that list, the Baldwin brothers' Gleaner added self-propulsion. Earlier combines, the so-called pull-type or tractor-drawn combines, were towed by tractors.

=== First design ===
The original Gleaner design was mounted on a Fordson Model F. It had a retail price of USD $950 FOB at the factory in Nickerson. This design was manufactured between 1923 and 1928.

=== Pull-types ===
From 1928 until 1954, Gleaner produced pull-type combine harvesters of both large and small sizes. The large models were intended for throughput and were the favored types for customer harvesters, while the small models were made for smaller, single-farm operations. Early "Gleaner-Baldwin" combines used the Ford Model A engine. The Gleaner Baldwin Model A, built from 1930 to 1935, was so equipped, as were later Gleaner Models, the NA and NR, until 1938. The combine's Model A engine was mounted on a frame fitted for the radiator, and was coupled to a power take-off unit.

Large Pull-Type Models
Model	Cutting Width	Grain Bin Capacity	Total Separation Area	Years Manufactured	Engine HP
A	12 ft	50 Bushels (US)	4992 in^{2}	1929 - 1935	Ford 4 cyl. - 32 HP Rating
R	12 ft	50 Bushels (US)	4992 in^{2}	1929 - 1935	Ford 4 cyl. - 32 HP Rating
NA	12 ft	50 Bushels (US)	5248 in^{2}	1936 - 1939	Ford 4 cyl. - 32 HP Rating
NR	12 ft	50 Bushels (US)	5248 in^{2}	1936 - 1939	Ford 4 cyl. - 32 HP Rating
E	12 ft	50 Bushels (US) 1939 - 1942 40 Bushels (US) 1942 - 1946 45 Bushels (US) 1946 - 1951	5248 in^{2}	1939 - 1951	Ford Le Roi 4 cyl. - 32.5 HP Rating (1939 -1946) Hercules - 35 HP Rating (1947 - 1948) Ford 6 cyl/226 - 48 HP Rating (1948 -1951)
F	12 ft	50 Bushels (US) 1939 - 1942 40 Bushels (US) 1942 - 1946 45 Bushels (US) 1946 - 1951	5248 in^{2}	1939 - 1951	Ford Le Roi 4 cyl. - 32.5 HP Rating (1939 -1946) Hercules - 35 HP Rating (1947 - 1948) Ford 6 cyl/226 - 48 HP Rating (1948 -1951)
J	12 ft		5248 in^{2}	1939 - 1950	Ford Le Roi 4 cyl. - 32.5 HP Rating (1939 -1946) Hercules - 35 HP Rating (1947 - 1948) Ford 6 cyl/226 - 48 HP Rating (1948 -1951)
H	12 ft		5248 in^{2}	1939 - 1950	Ford Le Roi 4 cyl. - 32.5 HP Rating (1939 -1946) Hercules - 35 HP Rating (1947 - 1948) Ford 6 cyl/226 - 48 HP Rating (1948 -1951)

Small Pull-Type Models
Model	Cutting WIdth	Grain Bin Capacity	Threshing Cylinder type and Width	Cleaning System Type	Total Separation Area	Years Manufactured	Engine HP
T	6 ft	20 Bushels (US)	Rasp Bar - 18 inches Wide	Raddle Chain	2880 in^{2}	1937 - 1941	Wisconsin 4 cyl. - 12.5 HP Rating (1937 - 1940) Wisconsin 4 cyl - 16 HP Rating (1940-1941)
S	6 ft	20 Bushels (US)	Rasp Bar - 18 inches Wide	Straw Walker	3024 in^{2}	1937 -1941	Wisconsin 4 cyl - 20 HP Rating
Six - S	7 ft 2 in	22 Bushels (US)	Rasp Bar - 22 inches Wide	Straw Walker	3168 in^{2}	1942 - 1953	Wisconsin 4 cyl - 21.5 HP Rating
P- 80	7 ft 8 in (80 inches wide hence the P-80 namesake)	22 Bushels (US)	Rasp Bar - 22 inches Wide		3168 in^{2}	1954 - 1955	Wisconsin 4 cyl/108 - 25 HP Rating

=== First in self-propelled ===
The Gleaner was one of the pioneers in self-propelled combines. They were often considered the "Cadillac" of the industry because of this feature and because of their solid engineering. Buescher (1991) credited the design principally to one of the brothers, Curt Baldwin, and explained that it focused on the needs of custom cutters like the Baldwin brothers themselves: contractors who move north with the harvest season, providing harvesting services to farmers. It resulted in machines that were reliable and useful, which benefited not only custom cutters but anyone who bought a Gleaner. The short wheelbase and axle track allowed the combine to fit on a truck. The grain header did not need to be detached for transit, because it fit over the cab of the truck. Buescher said, "Since custom cutters didn't know where their next parts supply source would be, Baldwin designed his combine so that it wouldn't need parts." (Buescher's tongue-in-cheek point is that the machines were designed and built well so that need for repairs would be minimal.) The frame was "like a bridge" in its strength. The bearings were chosen with service in mind: large and good quality (to obviate failure) and of common sizes (so that the operator could carry a small stock of spares in his truck, and have the size needed when a replacement became necessary). The Gleaner's exterior sheet metal was galvanized (zinc plated), providing superior weather resistance. As Buescher said, "Baldwin reasoned that most of his combines would sit outdoors. Texas and Oklahoma dust storms have a way of peeling paint off of machinery." As a result of the silver color of the zinc plating, the Gleaner brand ended up having a distinctive color (just as Allis had Persian Orange, IH had red, and John Deere had green), despite the sheet metal not even having any paint.

=== 1930s ===
During the Great Depression, owing mostly to the collapse of the farm economy and the Dust Bowl, the Baldwins' company entered bankruptcy in the 1930s as equipment sales plummeted. William James Brace acquired the company with his son-in-law, George Reuland. The pair, along with other investors, brought the company back to profitability and maintained ownership until 1955. During World War II, the factory converted its production to war materiel.

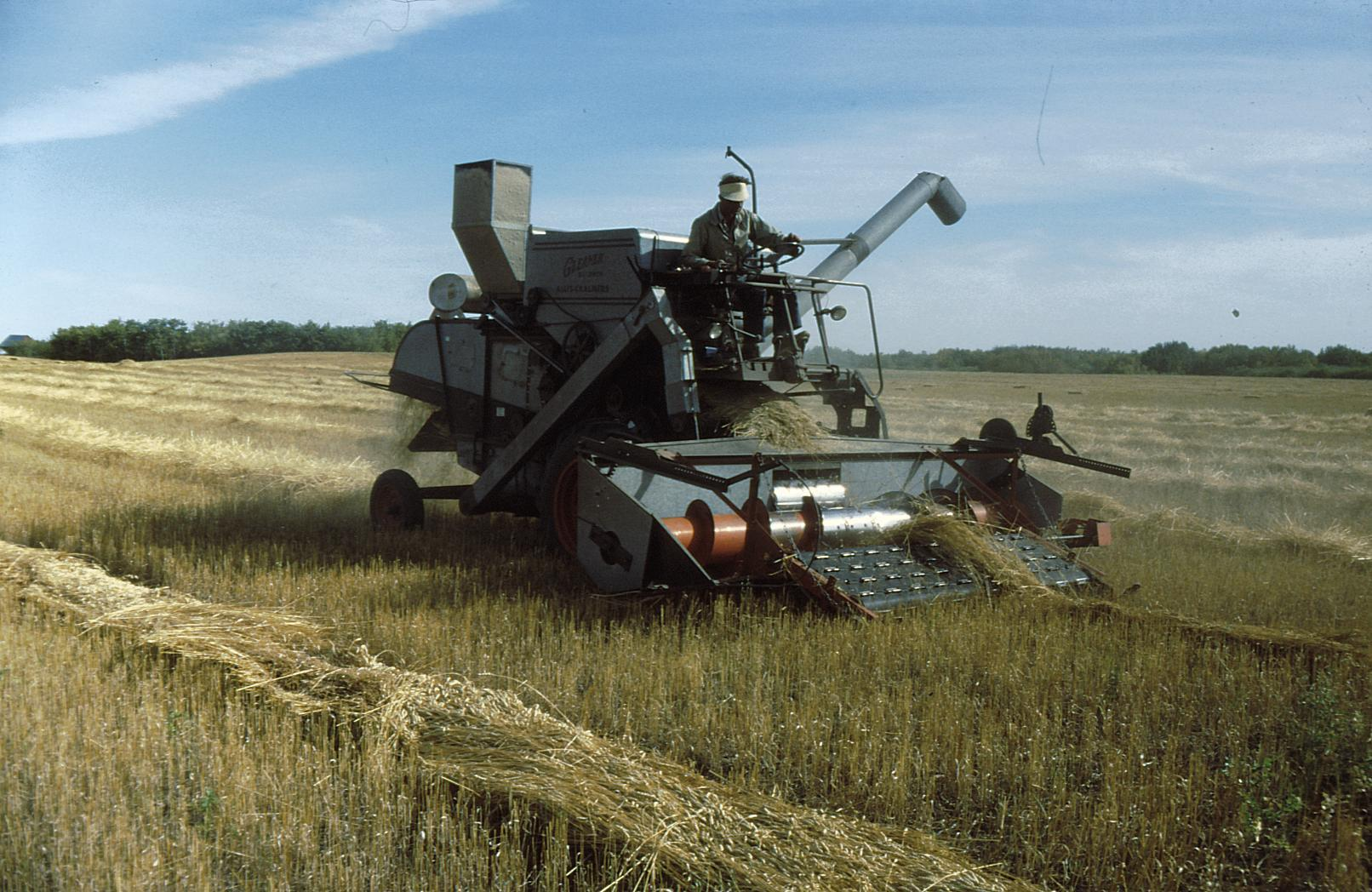
1965 Gleaner E harvester - Front View

=== 1940s and 1950s ===
By the late 1940s and early 1950s, other farm equipment manufacturers were offering increased competition to Gleaner, having introduced their own versions of self-propelled combines.

In 1955, Allis-Chalmers acquired Gleaner. This represented commercial renewal for Gleaner with the production and marketing success of various new models and technologies. It also represented a great gain for Allis-Chalmers. Allis was the market leader in pull-type (tractor-drawn) combines, with its All-Crop Harvester line. Acquiring Gleaner meant that it would also be a leader in self-propelled machines, and it would own two of the leading brands in combines. The Gleaner line augmented (and later superseded) the All-Crop Harvester line, and for several years Gleaner's profits made up nearly all of Allis-Chalmers' profit. Gleaners continued to be manufactured at the same factory, in Independence, Missouri, after the acquisition.

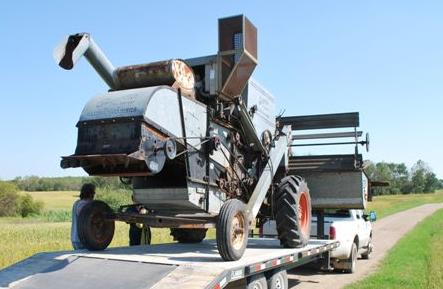
A 1965 Gleaner E displaying its ease of loading for over-the-road hauls

=== 1960s ===
From the start of this decade to its end, 8 different Gleaner models would be produced along with the company's first rice, tracked, and hillside machine variations. At the dawn of the 1960s the Model C self-propelled was made popular amongst custom harvest crews as it could be equipped with a 14 - 20 ft grain header or a 4 row corn head. This model had a down front threshing cylinder at 40 inches wide much like its predecessor model "A", but the cleaning area of the "C" was doubled in size in order to clean the increased grain throughput of the wider headers.

The model C also carried the specialized variations of "CR" for rice harvest, "CT" which was outfitted with steel tracks for very muddy conditions, and "CH" which was a hillside version made to market to grain farmers in the Pacific Northwest area of the United States known as the Palouse.

=== 1970s–1990 ===
In 1979, Gleaner released its first rotary combine, the N6. It was soon followed by the N5 and N7. The latter was the largest combine of its time, with grain and corn/row-crop headers as wide as 30 feet (9.1 m).

In 1985, Allis-Chalmers sold their farm machinery manufacturing business to Deutz AG and became known as Deutz-Allis, and in 1991 its North American operations became AGCO. Despite several ownership changes, the Gleaner brand never ceased to be produced or marketed. Between 1985 and 2000, Gleaner lost significant market share to other manufacturers with broader dealer bases and farm equipment product lines that had marketing and customer service advantages. Another problem for Gleaner was that some of their combines used the air-cooled Deutz engine, a departure from water-cooled engines predominantly found in most other industrial and agricultural applications.

=== 2000–present ===
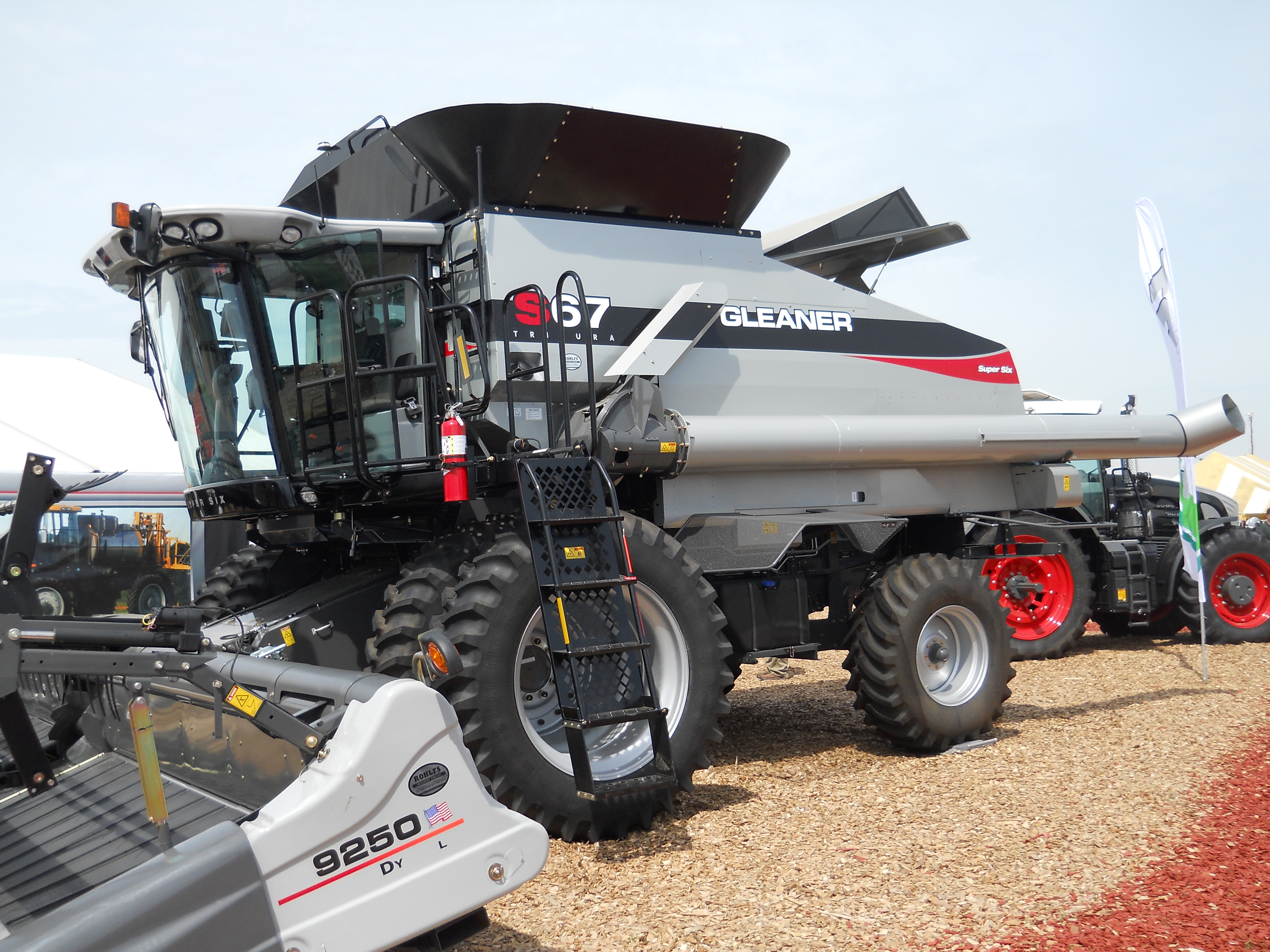
Gleaner S67 - Circa 2011

In 2000, AGCO moved the Gleaner manufacturing operations from Independence, Missouri to its Hesston, Kansas facility, which featured modernized manufacturing equipment and techniques. It also centralized the engineering and production functions into one location. The Hesston facility is 35 miles east of Nickerson, Kansas, where the Baldwin brothers started the Gleaner company in 1923.

For the period of 2007-2010, Gleaner offered the A5 and A6 models which featured an axial processor (rotor) rather than the signature transverse rotor. This was done as a marketing move by AGCO to use the strength of the Gleaner name to attract new customers to the axial machine which was more heavily produced as the Challenger 500x series and the Massey Ferguson 95xx series combines. The Gleaner A series production ceased after 2010 and the Challenger and Massey Ferguson machines ceased production in 2017.

In August of 2024, the company announced the release of the T-Series Gleaner which features a new transmission and final drives, a reversing system for the rotor processor, and new shielding enhancements to both sides of the machine.

== Firsts ==
Some of the firsts introduced by the Gleaner were: an auger that replaced canvas drapers, a rasp bar threshing cylinder instead of a spike-tooth arrangement, and a down-front cylinder that put threshing closer to the crop. In 1972 Gleaner was the first manufacturer to use electro-hydraulic controls, an innovation that other companies didn't offer until nearly two decades later. Gleaner was also the first in the industry to offer a 12 row corn head in 1979.

Gleaner also explored use of turbocharged diesel engines before the competition. Records from October 1962 list the 262-cubic-inch turbo-diesel engine as being available for the model "C".

Another Gleaner innovation was a "rock door" to protect the machine from damage due to stones that it might pick up while harvesting. If a Gleaner combine ingests a rock, the rock door simply pops open and drops the stone on the ground, preventing damage to the cylinder and concave bars, unlike other machines with a "rock trap" that the operator must periodically clean out or dump.

A current Gleaner and world first is that they created the first Class VIII transverse rotor combine. This happened when AGCO introduced the new Gleaner S88 series combine in 2014. Also during this year of manufacturing, a 7-cylinder 9.8L diesel engine, built by AGCO Sisu (Later AGCO POWER), was first used in the S78 and S88 models.

In 2016, with the release of the S9 series, came a completely new cab as well as the first use of a "fly-by-wire" hydrostatic transmission in a Gleaner combine, meaning the propulsion of the machine as controlled by operator no longer used a direct cable interface and was now achieved strictly by electronic feedback into a transmission control module.

In 2023, AGCO commemorated the 100th anniversary of the Gleaner combine with a special cenntenial edition paint scheme and badging for each S9 combine produced at the Hesston, Kansas plant.

== Today ==
Gleaners are still in production under AGCO. The Gleaner brand is marketed in North America, South America, and Australia.

The current models available for sale, still utilize the transverse rotor which was originally introduced in 1979.

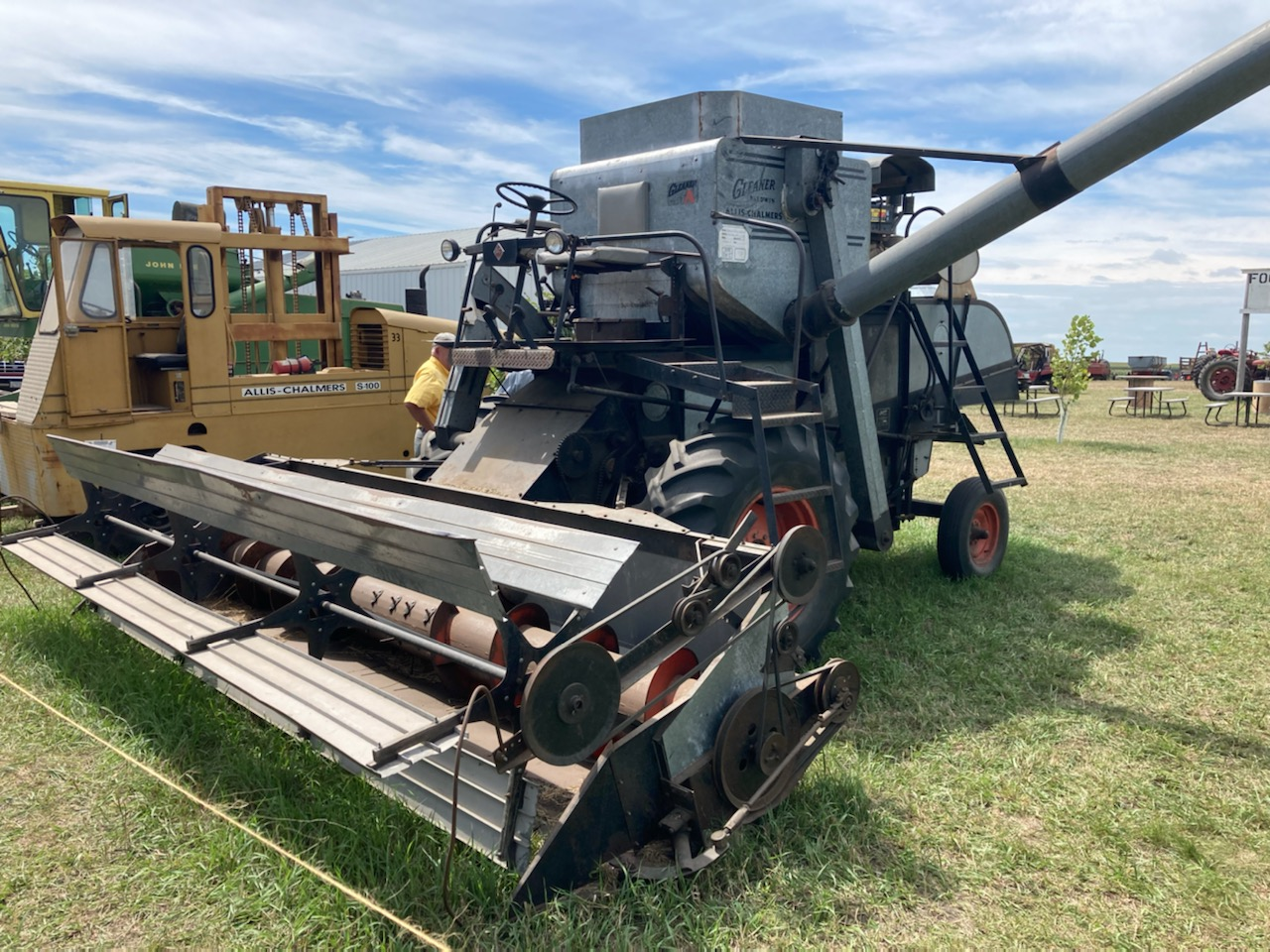
Gleaner Model A Combine

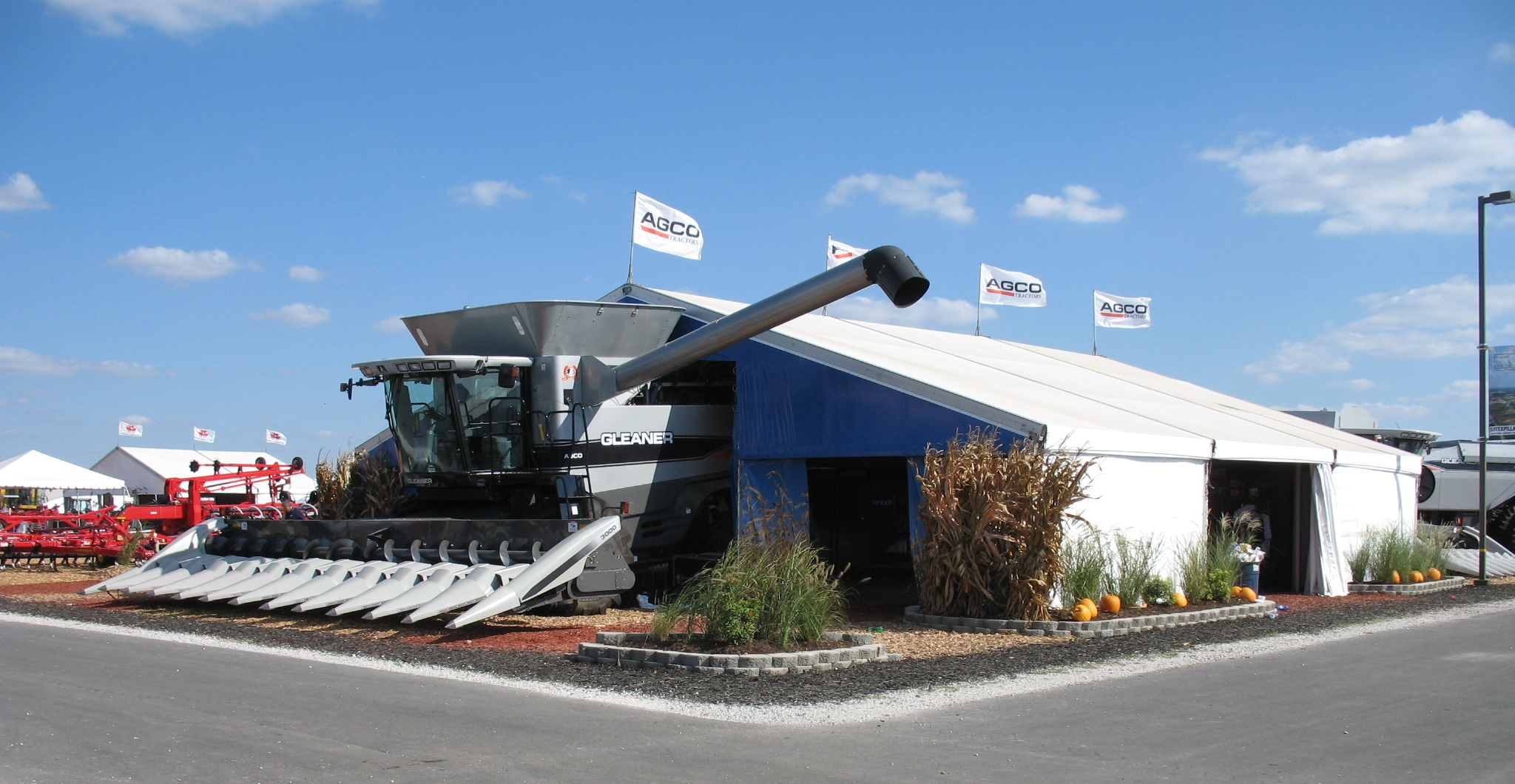
AGCO Gleaner combine at Farm Progress Show 2007

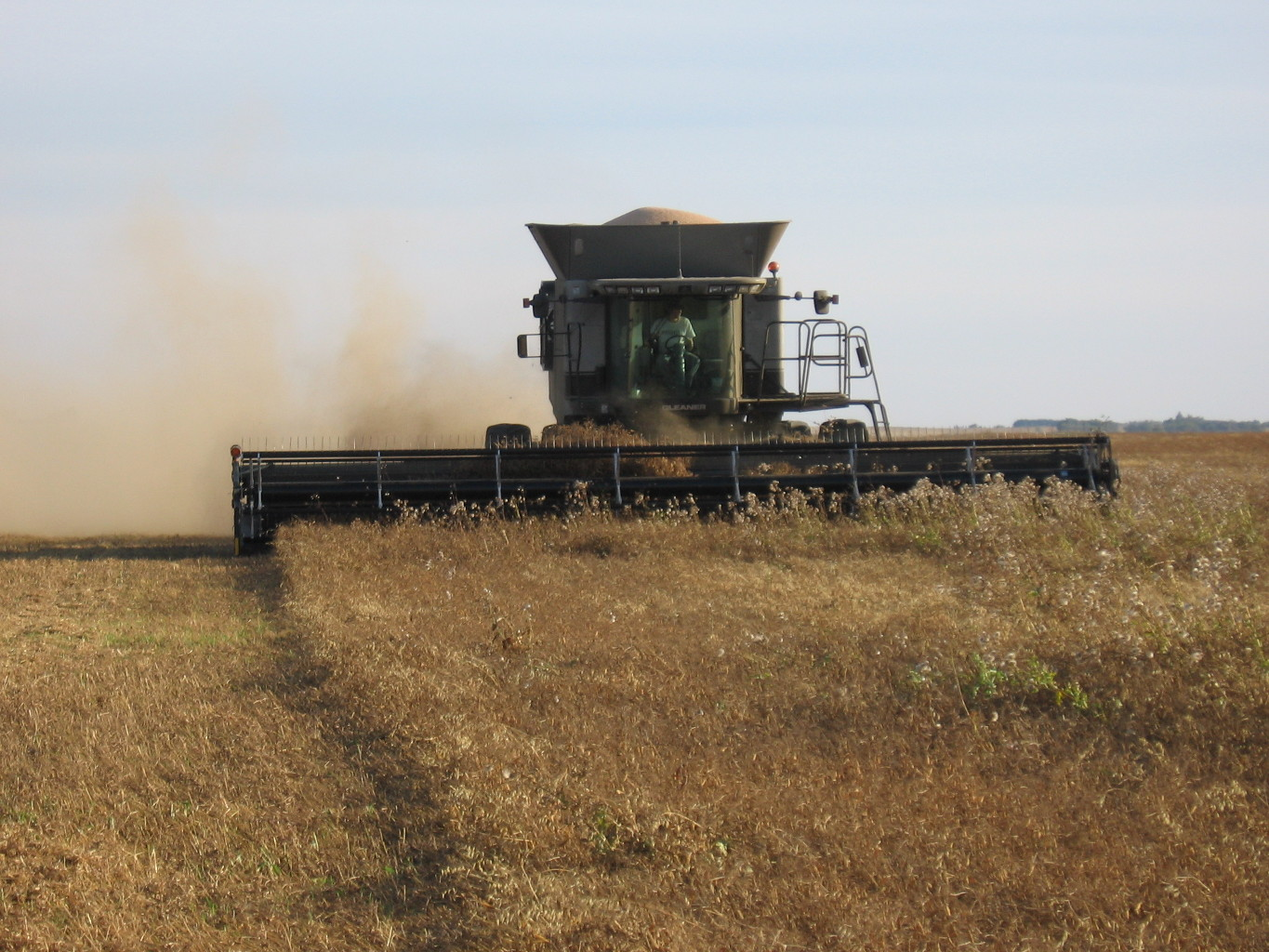
Gleaner A85 harvesting yellow peas

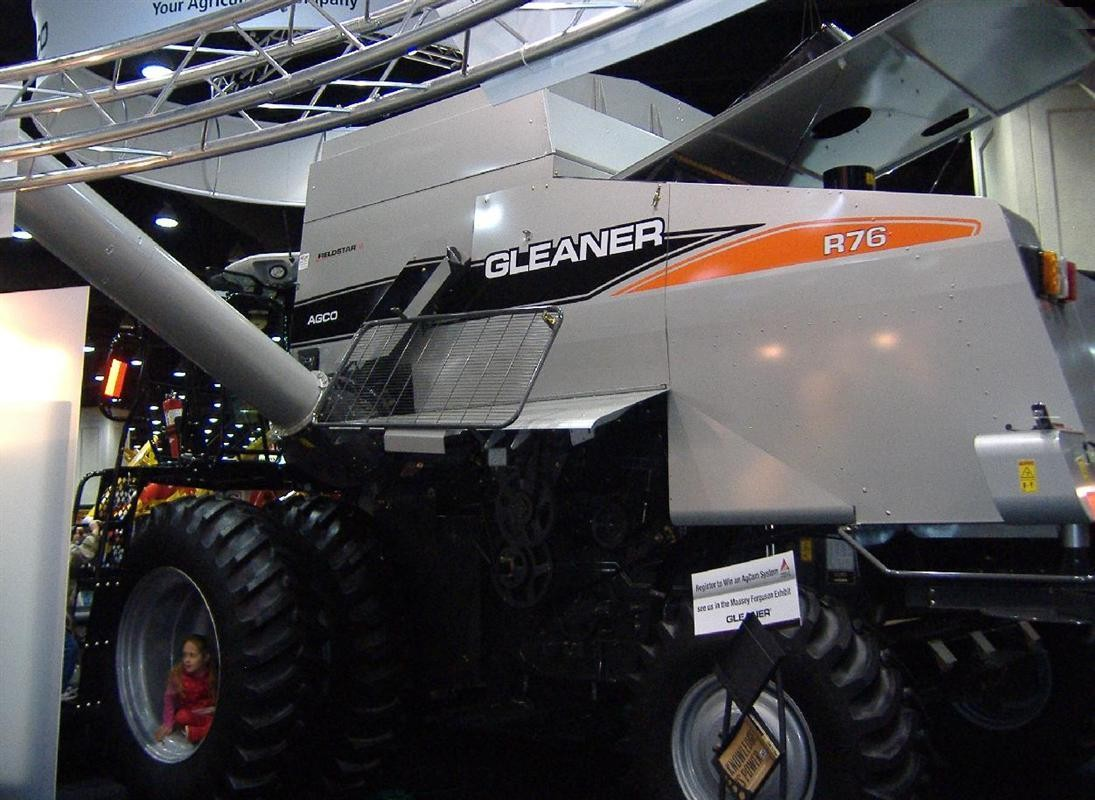
Gleaner Model R76

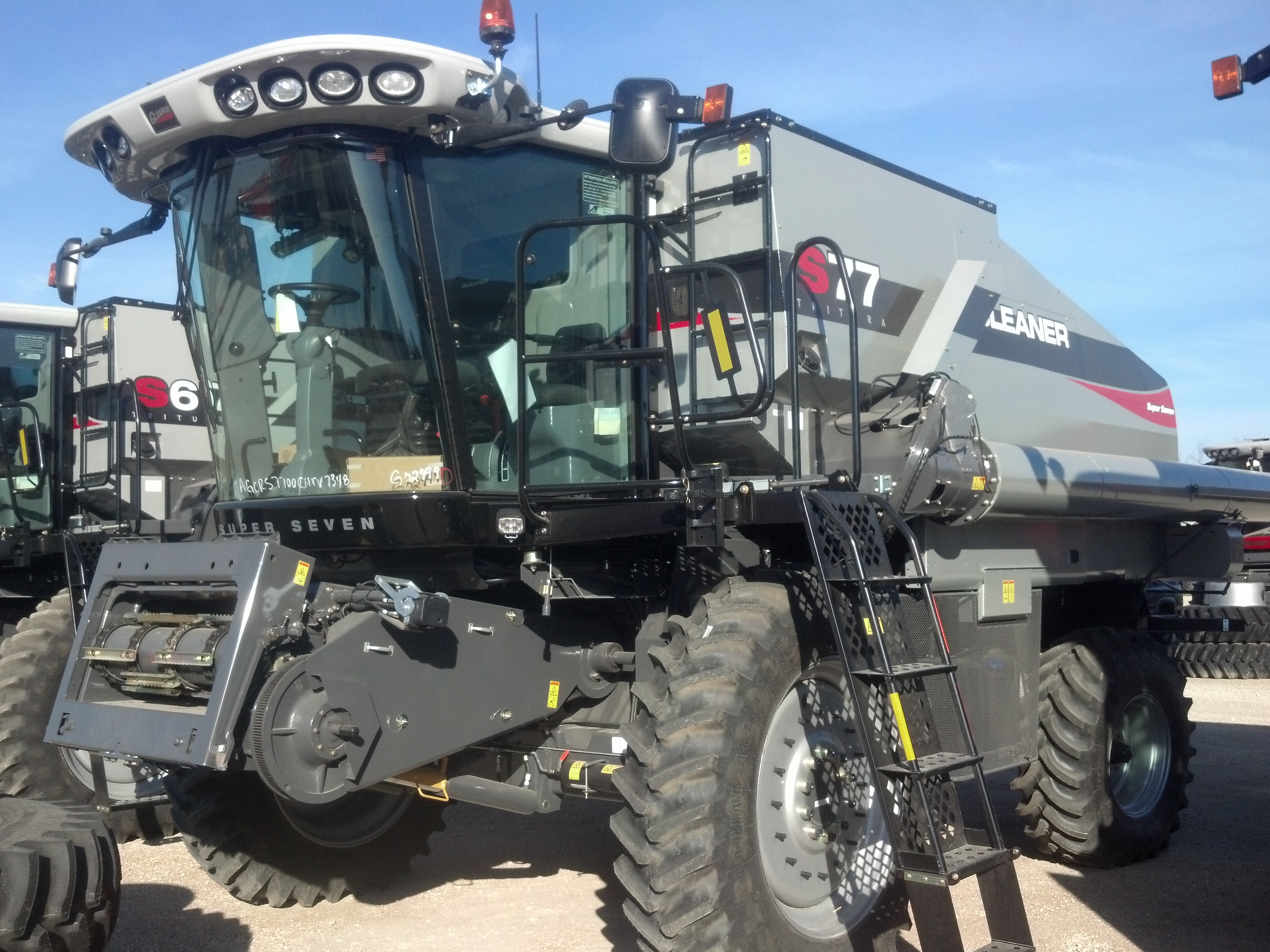
Gleaner S77 with Tritura Processor, 2012

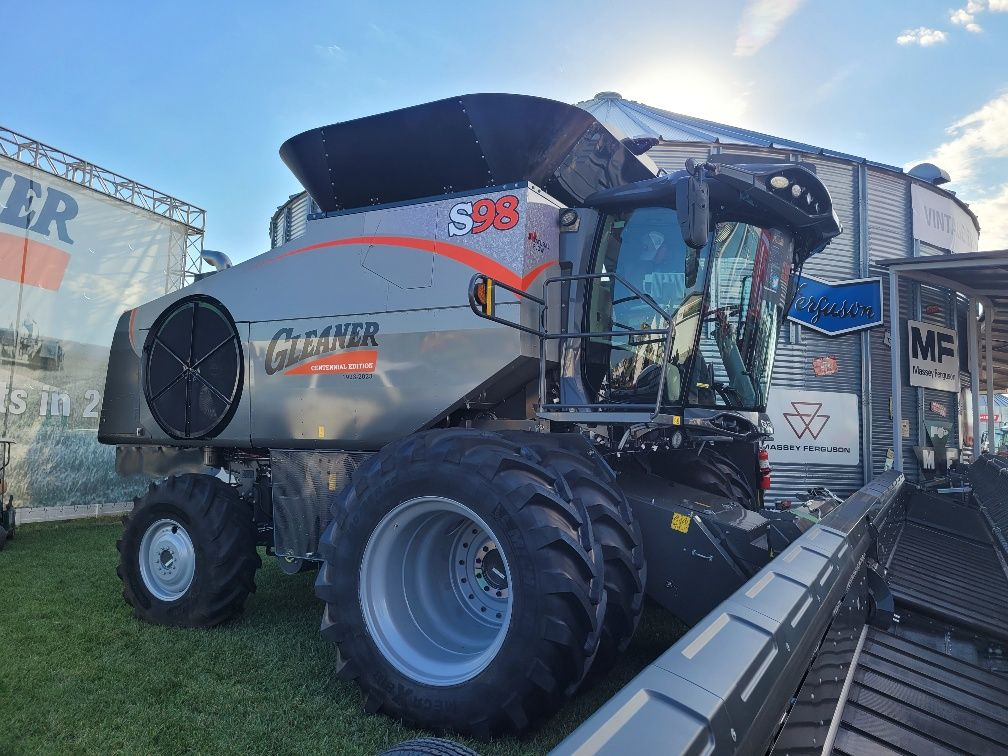
Gleaner S98 Centennial Edition, 2022

== Self-Propelled Models ==
Here is a list of Gleaner Combine models built from 1951 to present.

Model	Years Made	Grain Tank Size	Class	Engine	Rated Horsepower
Gleaner A	1951-1963	50 bushels	2	Ford 6 cyl/226 (1951-1952), Hercules 6 cyl/237 gas Engine (1953-1954), Allis-Chalmers gas 6 cyl/230 (1955-1963)	76 hp (A-C)
Gleaner T	1954	30 Bushels	1	Ford 4 cyl/172 cubic inch gas engine	45 hp
Gleaner AH (Hillside Special)	1959-1961	50 bushels	2	Allis-Chalmers gas 6 cyl/230	76 hp
Gleaner C	1960-1963	60 bushels	2	Allis-Chalmers gas 6 cyl/262 or Allis-Chalmers diesel 6 cyl/262 turbocharged diesel	93 hp
Gleaner E	1962-1967	40 bushels	1	Allis-Chalmers gas 4 cyl/226	63 hp
Gleaner C II	1964-1967	85 bushels	2	Allis-Chalmers gas 6 cyl/262	93 hp
Gleaner A II	1964-1967	55 bushels	2	Allis-Chalmers gas 6 cyl/230	76 hp
Gleaner E III	1968	63 bushels	2	Allis-Chalmers gas 4 cyl/226	63 hp
Gleaner K	1969-1976	66 bushels	2	GM gas 6 cyl/250 engine	78 hp
Gleaner F	1968-1976	120 bushels	3	A-C gas 6 cyl/262 (1968-1969), GM gas 6 cyl/292 (1970-1976) or A-C diesel Engine	93/84 hp
Gleaner G	1968-1972	100 bushels	N/A	A-C gas 6 cyl/301 (1968-1969), GM Gas V8/350 (1970-1972) or A-C diesel 6 cyl/301 Engine (1968-1972)	105/109 hp
Gleaner L	1972-1976	120 bushels	5	GM gas or A-C Diesel Engine	120/109 hp
Gleaner M	1973-1976	150 bushels	4	GM gas 8 cyl/350 or A-C diesel 6 cyl/301 Turbocharged engine	120/109 hp
Gleaner K2	1977-1981	68/96 bushels	2	GM gas 6 cyl/250 (1977-1981), or A-C diesel 4 cyl/200 Turbocharged engine (1978-1981)	85/72 hp
Gleaner F2	1977-1982	120 bushels	3	GM gas 6 cyl/292 (1977-1982) or A-C diesel 4 cyl/200 Turbocharged and Intercooled engine (1977-1982)	112/95 hp
Gleaner M2	1977-1982	165/180 bushels	4	Allis Chalmers Engine	130 hp
Gleaner L2	1977-1982	185/200 bushels	5	Allis Chalmers Engine	158 hp
Gleaner N5	1978-1985	200 bushels	5	Allis Chalmers Engine	190 hp
Gleaner N6	1978-1985	245 bushels	6	Allis-Chalmers Engine	240 hp
Gleaner N7	1978-1985	310 bushels	7	Allis-Chalmers Engine	270 hp
Gleaner F3	1983-1986	120 bushels	3	Allis-Chalmers diesel 4cyl/200 Turbocharged and Intercooled engine	95 hp
Gleaner M3	1983-1986	180 bushels	4	Allis-Chalmers Engine	145 hp
Gleaner L3	1983-1986	200 bushels	5	Allis-Chalmers Engine	158 hp
Gleaner R5	1986	230 bushels	5	Allis-Chalmers 6cyl/426 Engine	180 hp
Gleaner R6	1986	270 bushels	6	Allis-Chalmers 6cyl/426 Engine	220 hp
Gleaner R7	1986	300 bushels	7	Allis-Chalmers 6cyl/516 Engine	270 hp
Gleaner R40	1986-1992	230 bushels	4	Deutz 6.1L Air-Cooled Engine	155 hp
Gleaner R50	1986-1992	230 bushels	5	Deutz 6.1L Air-Cooled Engine	190 hp
Gleaner R60	1986-1992	270 bushels	6	Deutz 13.4L Air-Cooled Naturally Aspirated Engine	228 hp
Gleaner R70	1986-1992	300 bushels	7	Deutz 12.8L Air-Cooled, Twin Turbocharged Engine	270 hp
Gleaner L4	1990-1991	200 bushels	5	Cummins 5.9L Engine	175 hp
Gleaner R42	1992-1996	170 bushels	4	Deutz 6.1L Air-Cooled Engine	185 hp
Gleaner R52	1992-1996	225 bushels	5	Deutz 6.1L Air-Cooled Engine	230 hp
Gleaner R62	1992-1996	300 bushels	6	Deutz 12.8L Air-Cooled, Twin Turbocharged Engine	260 hp
Gleaner R72	1992-1996	300 bushels	7	Deutz 12.8L Air-Cooled, Twin Turbocharged Engine	300 hp
Gleaner R42 Updated	1996-2002	170 bushels	4	Cummins Engine	175 hp
Gleaner R52 Updated	1996-2002	225 bushels	5	Cummins 8.3L Engine	220 hp
Gleaner R62 Updated	1996-2002	300 bushels	6	Cummins 8.3L Engine	260 hp
Gleaner C62	1996-2002	300 bushels	6	Cummins 8.3L Engine	260 hp
Gleaner R72 Updated	1996-2002	330 bushels	7	Cummins 10.8L Engine	330 hp
Gleaner R55	2003-2006	250 bushels	5	Cummins Engine	230 hp
Gleaner R65	2003-2008	300 bushels	6	Cummins Engine (2003-2005) / AGCO 84 (2006-2008)	300 hp
Gleaner R75	2003-2008	330 bushels	7	Cummins Engine (2003-2005) / AGCO 84 (2006-2008)	350 hp
Gleaner R66	2008-2010	300 bushels	6	AGCO 84 Tier 3 Engine	300 hp
Gleaner R76	2008-2010	330 bushels	7	AGCO 84 Tier 3 Engine	350 hp
Gleaner A65	2007-2008	300 bushels	6	Cummins Engine	300 hp
Gleaner A75	2007-2008	300 bushels	7	Cummins Engine	350 hp
Gleaner A85	2007-2008	350 bushels	8	CAT C13 12.5L Engine	459 hp
Gleaner A66	2008-2010	300 bushels	6	AGCO 84 Tier 3 Engine	300 hp
Gleaner A76	2008-2010	300 bushels	7	AGCO 84 Tier 3 Engine	350 hp
Gleaner A86	2008-2010	350 bushels	8	CAT C13 12.5L Engine	425 hp
Gleaner S67	2011–2013	390 bushels	6	AGCO 84 Tier 4i Engine	314 hp
Gleaner S77	2011–2013	390 bushels	7	AGCO 84 Tier 4i Engine	370 hp
Gleaner S68	2014–2015	390 bushels	6	AGCO 84 Tier 4i Engine	322 hp
Gleaner S78	2014–2015	390 bushels	7	AGCO 98 Tier 4i Engine	375 hp
Gleaner S88	2014–2015	390 bushels	8	AGCO 98 Tier 4i Engine	430 hp
Gleaner S96	2016–2024	390 bushels	6	AGCO 84 Tier 4F Engine	322 hp
Gleaner S97	2016–2024	390 bushels	7	AGCO 98 Tier 4F Engine	375 hp
Gleaner S98	2016–2024	390 bushels	8	AGCO 98 Tier 4F Engine	430 hp
Gleaner T61	2025-Present	390 bushels	6	AGCO 84 Tier 4F Engine	344 hp
Gleaner T71	2025-Present	390 bushels	7	AGCO 98 Tier 4F Engine	397 hp
Gleaner T81	2025-Present	390 bushels	8	AGCO 98 Tier 4F Engine	452 hp

== Bibliography ==
- Buescher, Walter M. (1991), Plow Peddler, Macomb, Illinois, USA: Glenbridge Publishing, ISBN 978-0-944435-18-2. A memoir by a man who worked for Allis-Chalmers company for over 30 years as a sales representative and sales manager.
