= Claas Selbstfahrer =

Self-propelled combine harvester

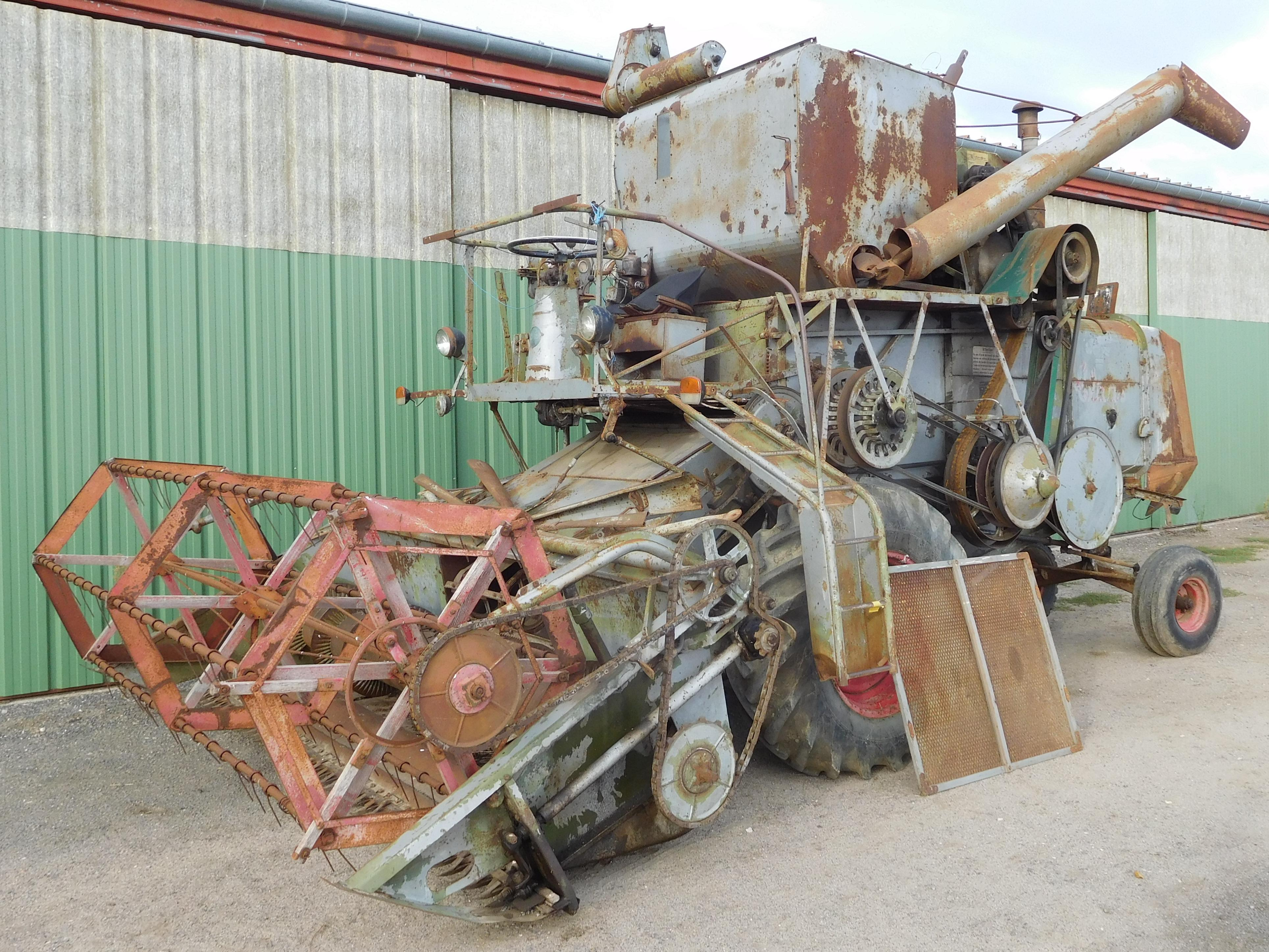
- Claas Selbstfahrer in a museum in France
- Type: Self-propelled combine harvester
- Manufacturer: Claas
- Production: 1952–1963
- Length: 7320 mm
- Width: 2950 mm
- Height: 3800 mm
- Weight: 4710 kg
- Propulsion: Tyres
- Engine model: Perkins 4.270 (Diesel, 4420 cm^{3}, 44 kW) Claas LD 40 (Diesel, 4700 cm^{3}, 44 kW) Unknown model (Otto, 41 kW)
- Succeeded by: Claas Matador Gigant

The Selbstfahrer is the first self-propelled combine harvester by Claas. In total, 19.465 units were produced from 1952 to 1963. The German name Selbstfahrer literally means Self-propeller and in the German agricultural language, it refers to a combine harvester or agricultural machine that can propel itself. Initially, the name of the Selbstfahrer was Hercules; due to an already registered trademark with the name Hercules, the combine harvester was renamed SF for Selbstfahrer in 1953. In contemporary brochures, the Selbstfahrer is called Claas Selbstfahrer Type S.F.55. It was targeted at agricultural contractors and large farms in Europe. In 1961, the Selbstfahrer was succeeded by the Matador. However, it was kept in production until 1963.

== Technical description ==
The Selbstfahrer is a self-propelled straw walker combine harvester. For the German market, the Selbstfahrer was offered with a 2600 mm cutter bar, in other countries, 3000 mm and 3600 mm cutter bars were offered as well. The cutter bars – designed for harvesting bent fruit – and the reel are adjustable vertically with a hydraulic system. The cutter bar is replaceable with a pickup-reel. The Selbstfahrer is usable as a stationary threshing machine as well.

The threshing drum with a width of 1250 mm and a diameter of 450 mm has six rasp bars, its rotational speed is infinitely adjustable between 650 min^{−1} and 1400 min^{−1}. The distance between the threshing drum and concave is finely adjustable. Four straw walkers with an overall width of 1250 mm and a total length of 2400 mm separate the remaining grain from the straw. The grain is cleaned twice with sieves measuring 920 mm × 1070 mm. An elevator transports the cleaned grain to a sorting cylinder on the roof. It sorts three quality grades of grain. For some fruit types, special sorting sieves were offered.

The sorted grain is sacked on the roof with a sack-filling machine, the sacks can either be put on the field or loaded over onto a trailer with a chute. The Selbstfahrer′s roof can store up to ¾ – 1 tonne of grain (15–20 sacks, 50 kg each). An unloading pipe was also available for the Selbstfahrer, grain can be unloaded with it while harvesting. A grain tank was offered by Claas too. Per hour, the Selbstfahrer can harvest up to 4 t of grain. The Selbstfahrer was offered with or without a straw baler.

Like later Claas combine harvesters, the Selbstfahrer has a three-speed-gearbox with an additional reverse gear. It also has a hydraulically controlled continuously variable transmission (CVT) that uses a belt to transfer the torque. The driving speed is adjustable within the three gears using the CVT. At maximum engine rotational speed, the top speed is 19 km/h in the third gear; the minimum speed is close to 0 km/h in the first gear. Only the front wheels are propelled, the tyres are filled with air.

The standard engine offered in the Selbstfahrer is a straight-six otto engine producing 41 kW. It is mounted on the roof to prevent the air intake from drawing in the threshing dust. The torque is transmitted to the gearbox with a single disc dry clutch. A straight-four diesel engine was offered as a factory option. At least two engine models were used: The Claas LD 40, a 4.7 L diesel and the Perkins 4.270, a 4.4 L diesel. Both engines produce 44 kW.

== Sources ==
- Claas-Selbstfahrer brochure, 1955
- Claas Mähdrescher S.F., 1956

== Bibliography ==
- Jürgen Hummel; Alexander Oertle; Jan Sternberg; Peter Felser, Mähdrescher: Geschichte und Technik (in German), Kempten: wk&f Kommunikation, p. 39, ISBN 978-3-8988-0417-2
