= Claas Matador Gigant =

Self-propelled combine harvester

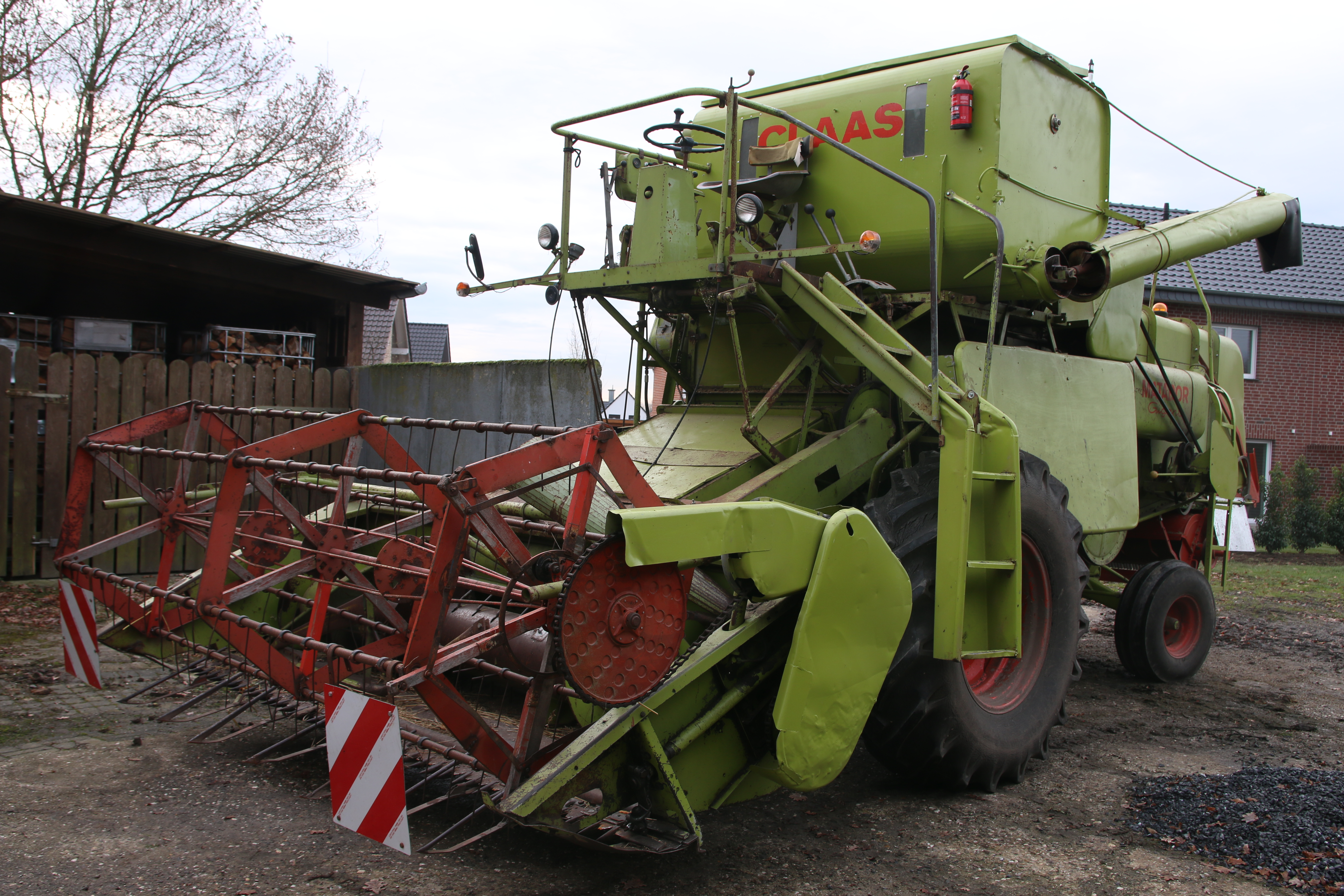
Claas Matador Gigant

The Matador Gigant, initially called Matador, is a self-propelled combine harvester produced by the German agricultural company Claas in Harsewinkel. The Matador Gigant is the largest combine harvester of the Matador series, the smaller Matador Standard was introduced afterwards. Approximately 35,000 units of the Matador series combine harvester were made from 1961 to 1969.

== Concept and production ==
The Matador succeeded the Selbstfahrer, which went into series production in 1953. Like the Selbstfahrer, the Matador was targeted at agricultural contractors and large farms with an arable area of more than 40 ha (0.15 sq mi). On average, the threshing rate amounts to 3,300 kg/h (7,300 lb/h). Within one hour, the Matador Gigant can harvest up to 0.5–1.1 ha (6,000–13,200 sq yd) when moving at speeds of 2–4.5 km/h (1.2–2.8 mph). Its average fuel consumption is 9.6 L/h (2.5 US gal/h); the fuel tank has a capacity of 150 L (39.6 US gal). Back in 1963, Claas sold the Matador Gigant for DM 34,130. Most of the produced combine harvesters were exported.

For the series production of the Matador Gigant, Claas made structural alterations to the production line in Harsewinkel, the harvesters were now assembled diagonally to let transport vehicles cross the production line. At the end of the production line, the harvesters were tested in three steps. Smaller combine harvesters were produced on a separate production line.

== Technical specifications ==
Matador Gigant
Grain tank volume	Standard: 2.155 m^{3} (76.1 cu ft); With extender: 2.690 m^{3} (95.0 cu ft)
Straw walker area	4.5 m^{2} (48.4 sq ft)
Sieve area	3.15 m^{2} (33.9 sq ft)
Threshing drum	1,250 mm × 450 mm (4.1 ft × 1.5 ft)
Cutter width	Standard: 3 m (10 ft); Optional: 2.6 m (8.5 ft); 3.6 m (12 ft); 4.2 m (14 ft); 6 m (20 ft)
Engine	Perkins 6.354 (Diesel, 354 in^{3} (5,801 cm^{3}), 86 hp (64 kW)) Ford 590 E (Diesel, 330 in^{3} (5,408 cm^{3}), 86 hp (64 kW))
Speed range	1.56–19.85 km/h (0.97–12.33 mph)
Length	9,830 mm (387.0 in)
Width	4,200 mm (165.4 in)
Height	3,530 mm (139.0 in)
Mass	5,360 kg (11,817 lb)

== Bibliography ==
- Operating manual Claas Matador Gigant. Late 1960s
- Manfred Baedecker, Ralf Lenge: Die Claas Mähdrescher Story. 2nd Edition. Landwirtschaftsverlag, Hiltrup 2003, ISBN 978-3-7843-3053-2, p. 64–67.
- Claas Matador Gigant brochure. July 1965
