= List of Allis-Chalmers tractors =

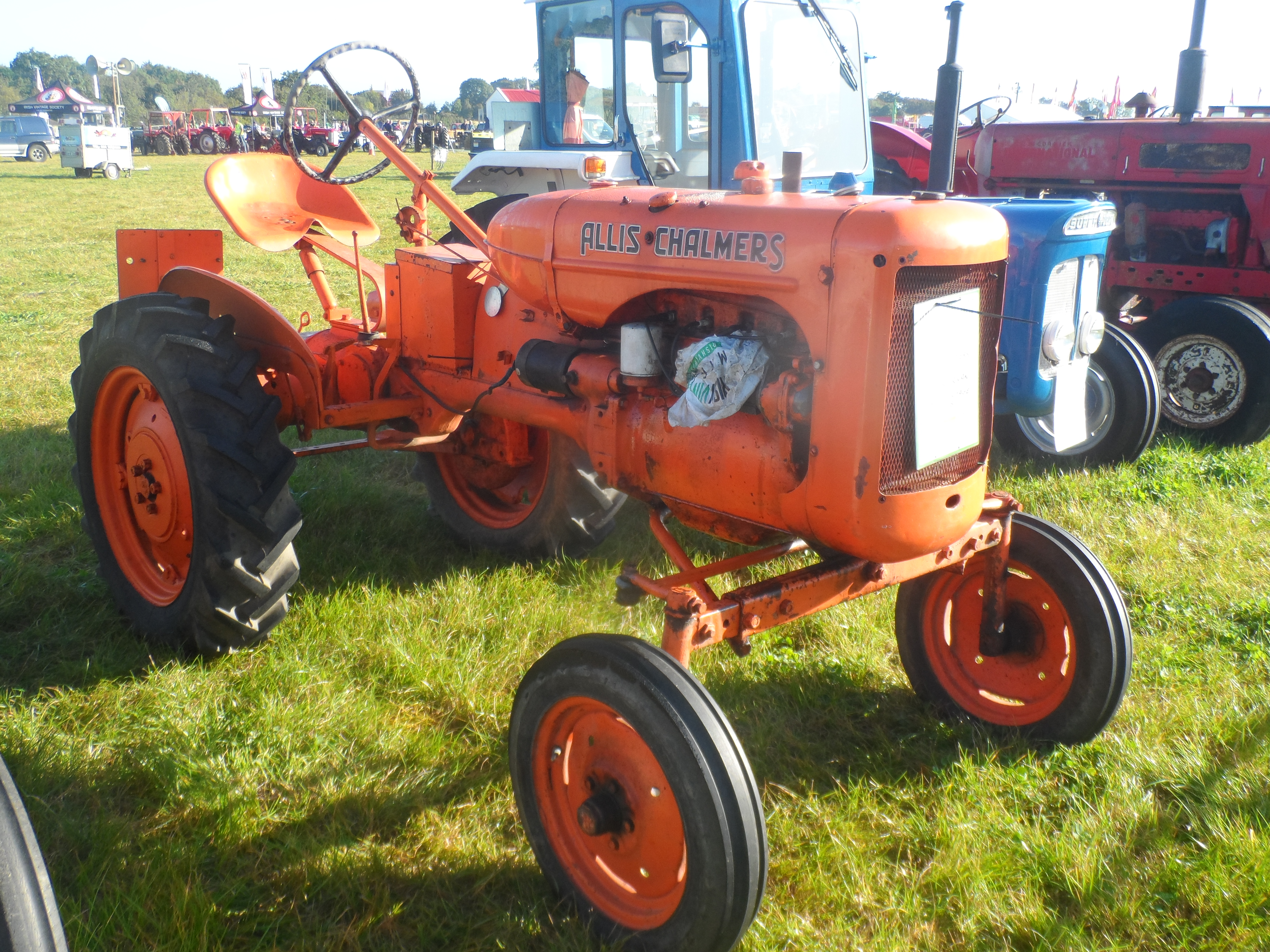
An Allis-Chalmers tractor

This is a list of farm and industrial tractors produced by Allis-Chalmers Corporation, as well as tractors that were produced by other manufacturers and then sold under the Allis-Chalmers brand name.

For clarity, tractors are listed by series and separated by major models as needed.

== Tractors (wheeled) ==
- Lawn/garden tractor series
  - B-Series
    - B-1
    - B-7 (prototype only 3 built)
    - B-10 (early, 9 hp)
    - Big Ten
    - B-10 (late, 10 hp)
    - B-12
    - B-110
    - B-112
    - B-206
    - B-207
    - B-208
    - B-208S
    - B-210
    - B-212
    - HB-112
    - HB-212
  - Numbered series
    - Homesteader
    - 310
    - 310D
    - 312
    - 312D
    - 312H
    - 314H
    - 410S
    - 414S
    - 416S
    - 416H
    - 608 LTD
    - 610
    - 611 LT
    - 614
    - 616
    - 620
    - 710
    - 712
    - 712S
    - 714
    - 716
    - 718H
    - 720
    - T-811
    - 808 GT
    - 810 GT
    - 816 GT
    - 912
    - 914
    - 916
    - 917
    - 919
    - 920
- Allis-Chalmers 4W series

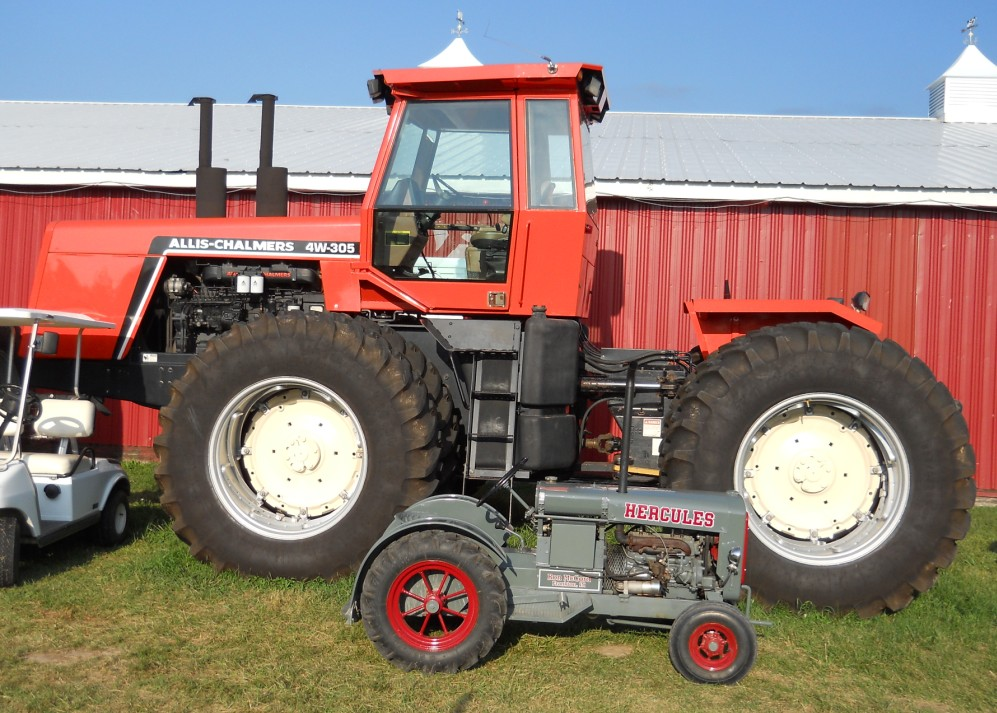
4W-305, the largest Allis-Chalmers tractor made

4W-220 (1981-1984) (articulated)
4W-305 (1981-1985) (articulated)

- Allis-Chalmers 100 series

160 (1969-1973): Also known as One-Sixty; imported from Renault (France)
170 (1967-1973): Also known as One-Seventy
175 (1970-1980)
180 (1967-1973): Also known as One-Eighty
185 (1970-1981)
190 (1964-1973): Also known as One-Ninety
190XT
200 (1972-1975)
210
220 (1969-1973): Also known as Two-Twenty
440 (1972-1976): Built by Steiger

- Allis-Chalmers 5000 series

5015 (1982-1985): Imported from Toyosha (Japan)
5020 (1977-1985): Imported from Toyosha (Japan)
5030 (1978-1985): Imported from Toyosha (Japan)
5040 (1975-1980): Imported from UTB (Romania)
5045 (1981): Imported from Fiat (Italy)
5050 (1976-1983): Imported from Fiat (Italy)

- Allis-Chalmers 6000 series

6040 (1974): Imported from Renault (France)
6060 (1980-1984)
6070 (1984-1985)
6080 (1980-1985)
6140 (1982-1985): Imported from Toyosha (Japan)

- Allis-Chalmers 7000 series

7000 (1975-1979)
7010 (1979-1981)
7020 (1977-1981)
7030 (1973-1974)
7040 (1974-1977)
7045 (1977-1981)
7050 (1973-1974)
7060 (1974-1981)
7080 (1974-1981)
7580 4WD (1976-1981) (articulated)

- Allis-Chalmers 8000 series

8010 (1981-1985)
8030 (1981-1985)
8050 (1981-1985)
8070 (1981-1985)
8550 (1977-1981)

- Allis-Chalmers B series

Model B (1937-1957)
Model IB (1945-1958)

- Allis-Chalmers C series

Model C (1940-1950)
Model CA (1950-1958)

- Allis-Chalmers D series

Model D10 (1959-1968; Series I, II and III)
Model D12 (1959-1968; Series I, II and III)
Model D14 (1957-1960)
Model D15 (1960-1968; Series I and II)
Model D17 (1957-1967; Series I, II, III and IV)
Model D19 (1961-1964)
Model D21 (1963-1969; Series I and II)

- Allis-Chalmers I series: Industrial tractors

Model I40 (1964-1966)
Model I60 (1965-1966)
Model I400 (1966-1968)
Model I600 (1966-1968)

- Allis-Chalmers Model 6-12 (1918–1923)
- Allis-Chalmers Model 10-10 (1914–1923)
- Allis-Chalmers Model A (1936–1942)
- Allis-Chalmers Model E (1918–1936): Also known as Model 15-30, 18-30, 20-35, 25-40, 30-60 (The 30-60 is a rare variation of the 25-40 also known as the "Thresherman's Special")
- Allis-Chalmers Model ED40 (1964):200 imported from Allis-Chalmers International (United Kingdom Essendine factory) through Canadian dealerships.
- Allis-Chalmers Model G (1948–1955)
- Allis-Chalmers Model L (1920–1927): Also known as Model 12-20, 15-25
- Allis-Chalmers Model T16 "Sugar Babe"
- Allis-Chalmers U Series
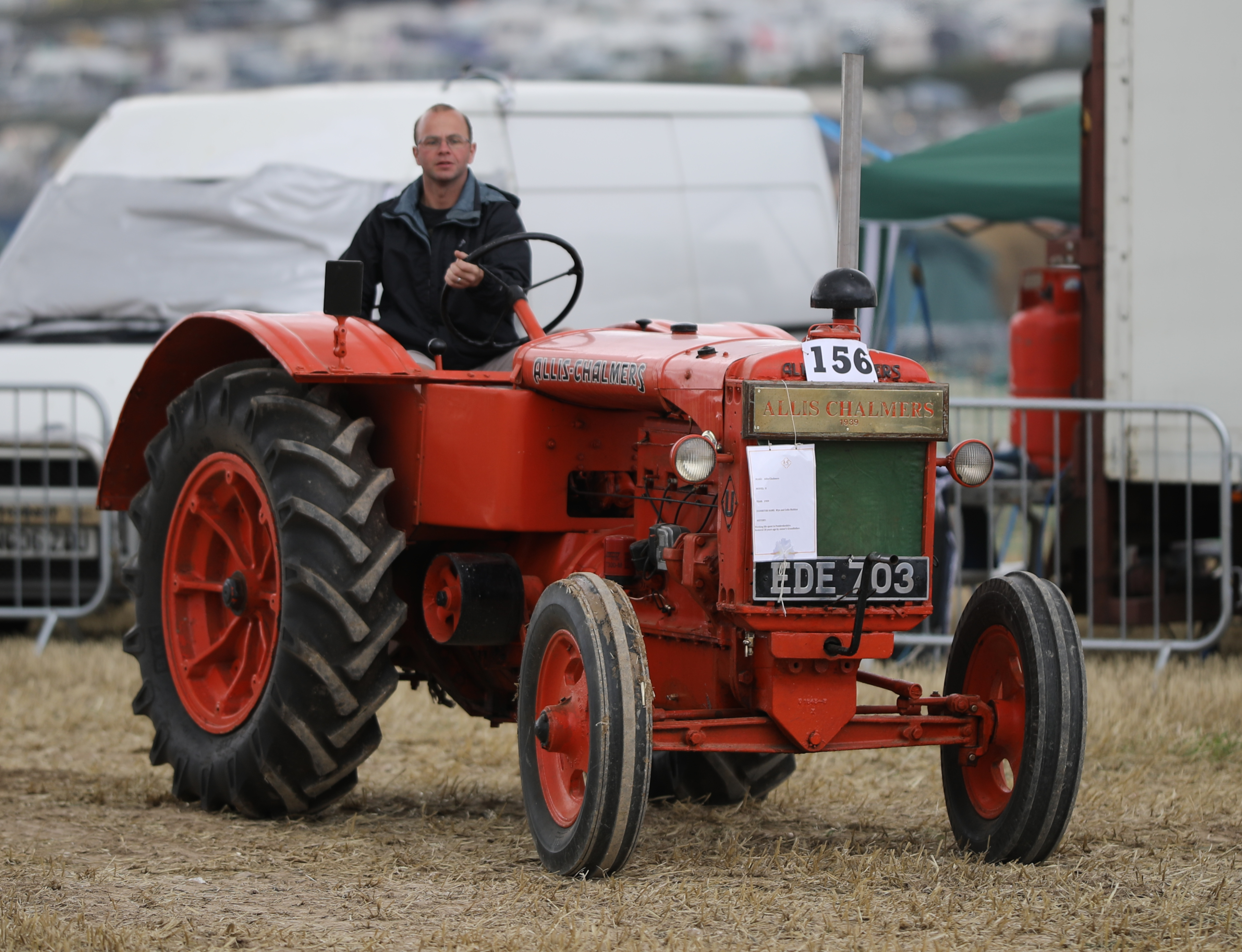
  1939 Allis-Chalmers U tractor

Model U (1929-1952): Also known as United
Model UC (1930-1953): Also known as All-Crop or Cultivator
Model UI (1937-1947)

- Allis-Chalmers W series

Model WC (1933-1948)
Model WD (1948-1953)
Model WD45 (1953-1957)
Model WF (1937-1951)
Model RC (1938-1941)

After the second world war Allis Chalmers operated factories in the United Kingdom at Totton (to 1949) in Totton Hampshire and Essendine in Rutland. Formerly the Minneapolis-Moline factory.

Model EB (1950-1955) British built model B with a straight front axle. EB serial numbers from Essendine works began at EB-4001. Some 2000 were assembled at the Totton, Southampton facility between 1947/9 from imported CKD kits but using US serial numbers locally stamped with an additional E prefix. Theoretically there may be duplication of serial numbers with later English production tractors.

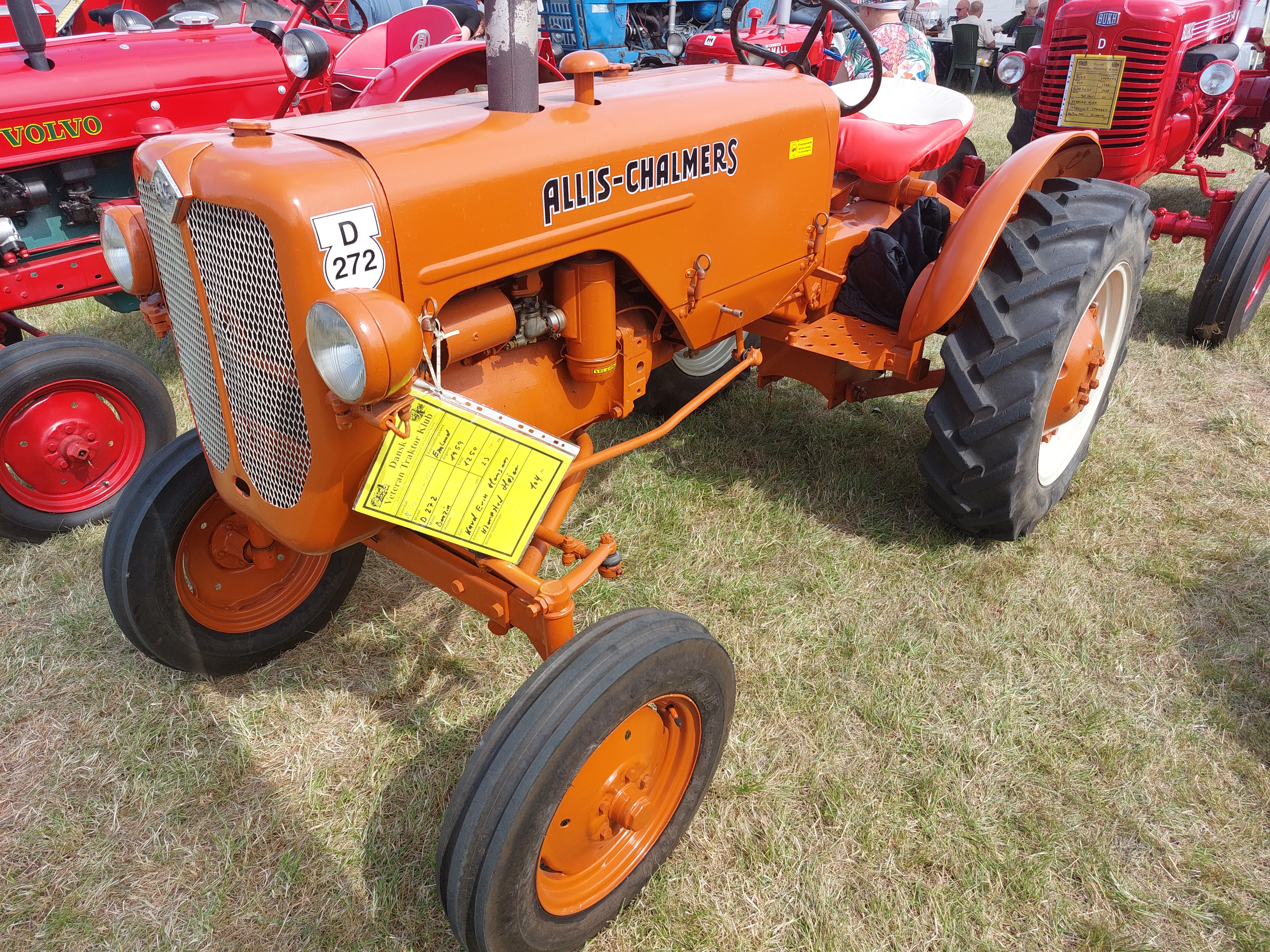
1959 Allis-Chalmers D272

Model D270 (1954-1957)
Model D272 (1957-1960)
Model ED40 (1960-1968)

== Tractors (tracked) ==
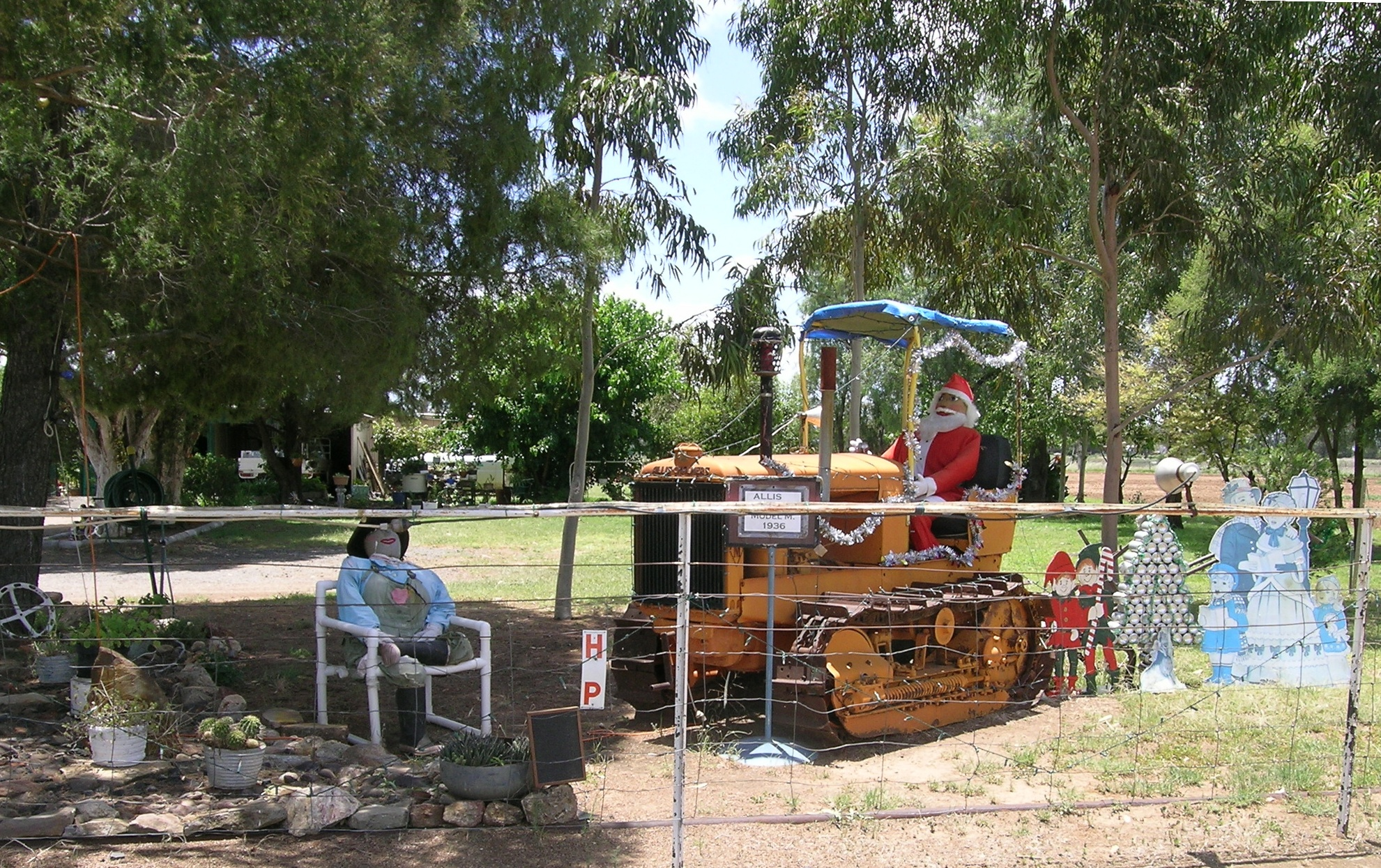
A 1936 Allis-Chalmers tractor decorated for Christmas, Boggabri, NSW

- Allis-Chalmers HD series

Model H3 (1960-1968)
Model HD3 (1942)
Model HD3 (1960-1968)
Model HD4 (1965-1969?)
Model HD5 (1946-1955)
Model HD6 (1955-1974)
Model HD7 (1940-1950)
Model HD9 (1950-1955)
Model HD10 (1940-1950)
Model HD11 (1955-1975?)
Model HD14 (1939-1947)
Model HD15 (1950-1955)
Model HD16 (1955-1975?)
Model HD19 (1947-1950)
Model HD20 (1951-1954)
Model HD21 (1954-1975)
Model HD31
Model HD41 (1969-1974)

- Allis-Chalmers K series

Model K (1929-1941) formerly Monarch 35
Model KO (1934-1943)

- Allis-Chalmers L series

Model L (1931-1942)
Model LD (1939)
Model LO (1934)

- Allis-Chalmers Model M (1932–1942)
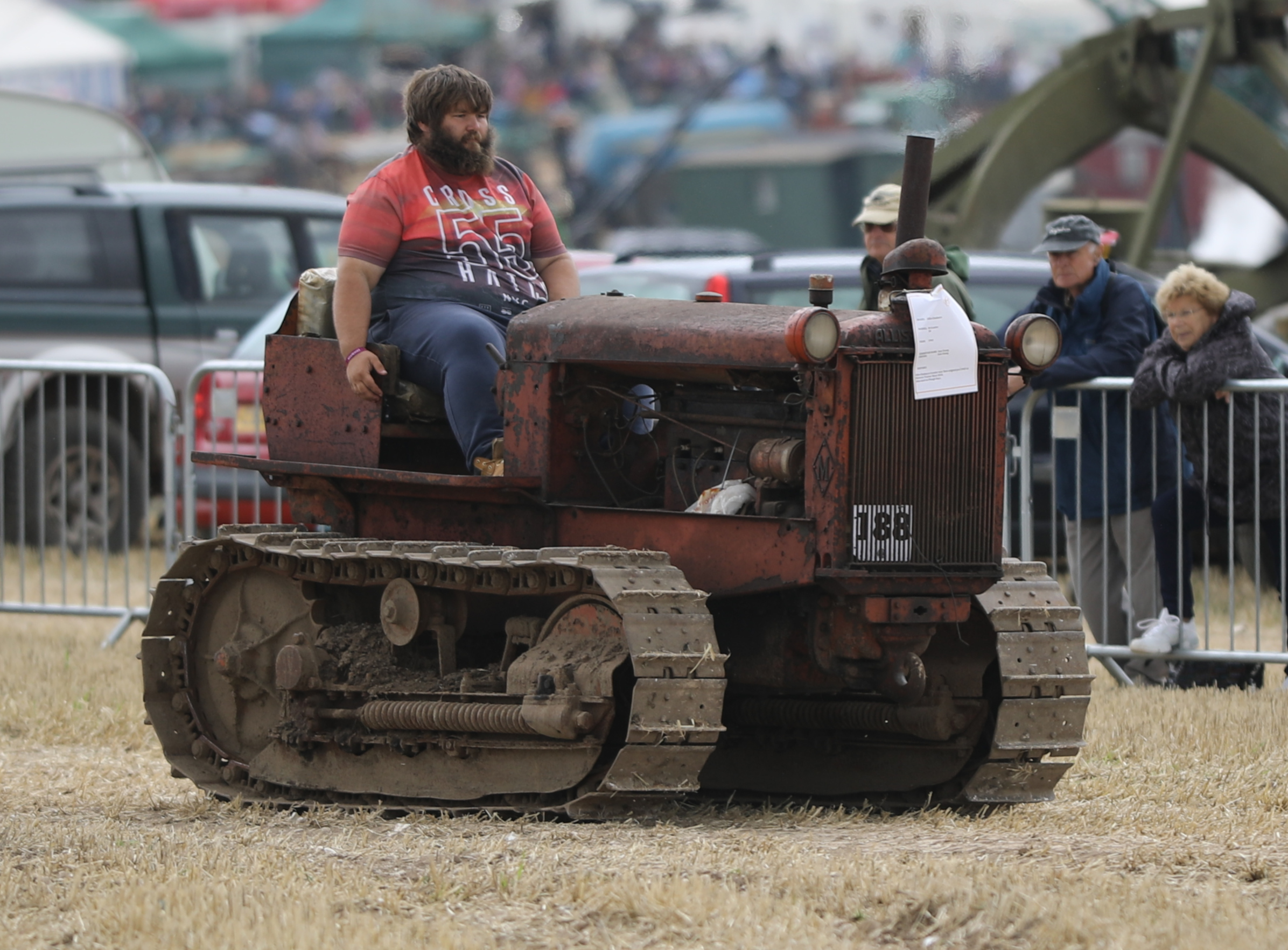
  1942 model M
- Allis-Chalmers Monarch Series: formerly built by Monarch Tractor Corporation

Monarch Model F (1926-1931)
Monarch Model G (1926-1927)
Monarch Model H (1927-1931)

- Allis-Chalmers S series

Model S (1937-1942)
Model SO (1937-1942)

== Harvesters ==
- Gleaner C
- Gleaner E
- Gleaner E-III
- Gleaner G
- Gleaner K
- Gleaner L2
- Gleaner M
- Gleaner A85

=== All-Crop harvesters ===
- All-Crop 40
- All-Crop 60
- All-Crop 66
- All-Crop 72
- All-Crop 90
- All-Crop 100

== Military production ==
- M1 tractor medium model HD7W
- M1 tractor heavy model HD10W
- M4 tractor high-speed 18-ton artillery tractor manufactured from 1943.
- M6 tractor high-speed 38-ton (artillery tractor)
- M7 snow tractor
- M19 snow trailer, 1-ton
- M50 Ontos – a light anti-tank vehicle, 297 units produced from 1955 to 1957.

== Other related equipment ==
- Allis-Chalmers Speed Patrol: road grading and maintenance tractors

Speed Patrol model H (1932–1933)
Speed Patrol model 42 (1933–1940)
Speed Patrol model 54 (1934–1940)

== Prototype models ==
- Allis-Chalmers fuel-cell tractor (1959)
- Allis-Chalmers model D (ca. 1944–1945): not related to later production D series
- Allis-Chalmers model F (ca. 1947)
- Allis-Chalmers model H (ca. 1942–1945): Four-wheel-drive tractor, based on Bonham Power Horse design

== See also ==
- List of Allis-Chalmers engines
