= Allis-Chalmers Model 6-12 =

Farm tractor produced by Allis-Chalmers

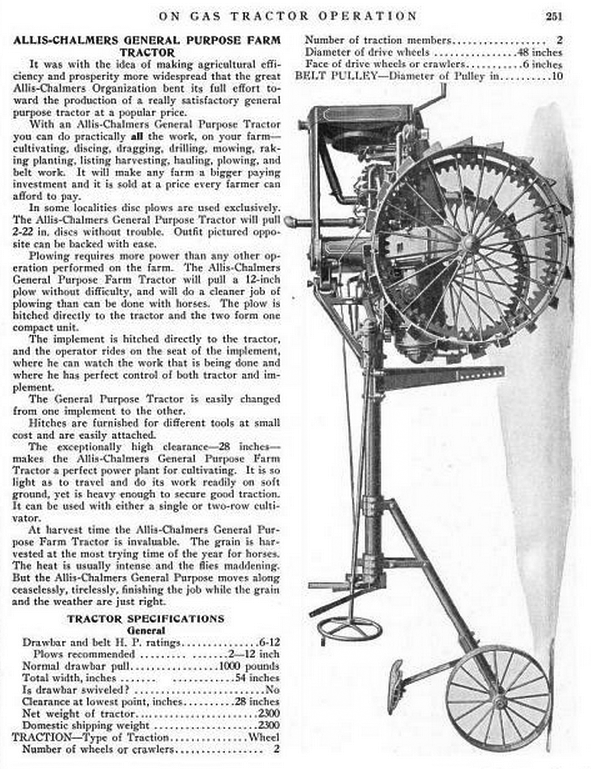
Allis-Chalmers 6-12 tractor, 1920.

The Allis-Chalmers Model 6-12 was a farm tractor produced by Allis-Chalmers between 1918 and 1923. Like many other tractors of the era, its model name came from its horsepower ratings, with 6-12 (or 6/12) meaning 6 hp at the drawbar and 12 hp at the belt pulley.

The Allis 6-12 was an early attempt at a lightweight, versatile, low-cost, general-purpose tractor that would be suitable for all of the work on a farm, including not only traction work (such as ploughing and harrowing) and belt work (such as threshing and sawing) but also cultivating. Like other two-wheel tractors, it used its implement to provide the rear axle to make up a four-wheel articulated unit, with the operator riding the implement.

The Allis 6-12 entered the market at a time when the mechanization of agriculture was underway but was far from complete. Tractors had not yet managed to completely replace the horse team for all farm tasks. The product category of row-crop tractors as we know them today had not yet been developed, and the Allis 6-12 had a very attractive value proposition. Unfortunately that proposition was also suspiciously similar to that of the Moline Universal tractor, which had been on the market for about 2 years before the Allis 6-12 appeared. Moline Plow considered the Allis 6-12 a patent-infringing copy. The late 1910s were a period when various two-wheeled and three-wheeled tractors were on the U.S. market. Moline Plow had by no means invented such configurations. However, the Allis 6-12 was especially similar to the Moline Universal, lending credibility to Moline Plow's assertion that it was a copy.

Both the Allis 6-12 and the Moline Universal ended production in 1923. By then, not only had an economic recession and resulting tractor price war damaged such companies' finances, but also, the tractor market was evolving. Going forward, newer four-wheel designs (such as the Farmall), which would become what we now call the row-crop tractor category, would be the focus of the light farm tractor market. Two-wheel tractors would continue to have a place in agriculture both in the U.S. and around the world, but they would no longer compete in the same market segment as the larger four-wheel row-crop designs. However, the Allis-Chalmers Model G, introduced two decades later, was an interesting design that in some respects echoed the concept of the 6-12, albeit now "facing the other way", with the implement leading and the motorized drive unit now pushing rather than pulling.

== See also ==
- List of Allis-Chalmers tractors
- List of Allis-Chalmers engines

== Bibliography ==
- Adams, Harry W., ed. (1920), Adams' Common Sense Instruction On Gas Tractor Operation: A Book For Tractor Operators Who Desire To Know The Most Efficient Methods Of Maintaining A Tractor At Its Highest Working Power. With Contributions From Many Of The Leading Tractor And Accessory Manufacturers Of The United States, Minneapolis, Minnesota, USA: Jensen Printing Company.
- Sanders, Ralph W. (1996), Vintage farm tractors: the ultimate tribute to classic tractors, Stillwater, Minnesota, USA: Town Square Books, ISBN 978-0896582804.
