= Allis-Chalmers 190XT =

Allis-Chalmers One-Ninety XT
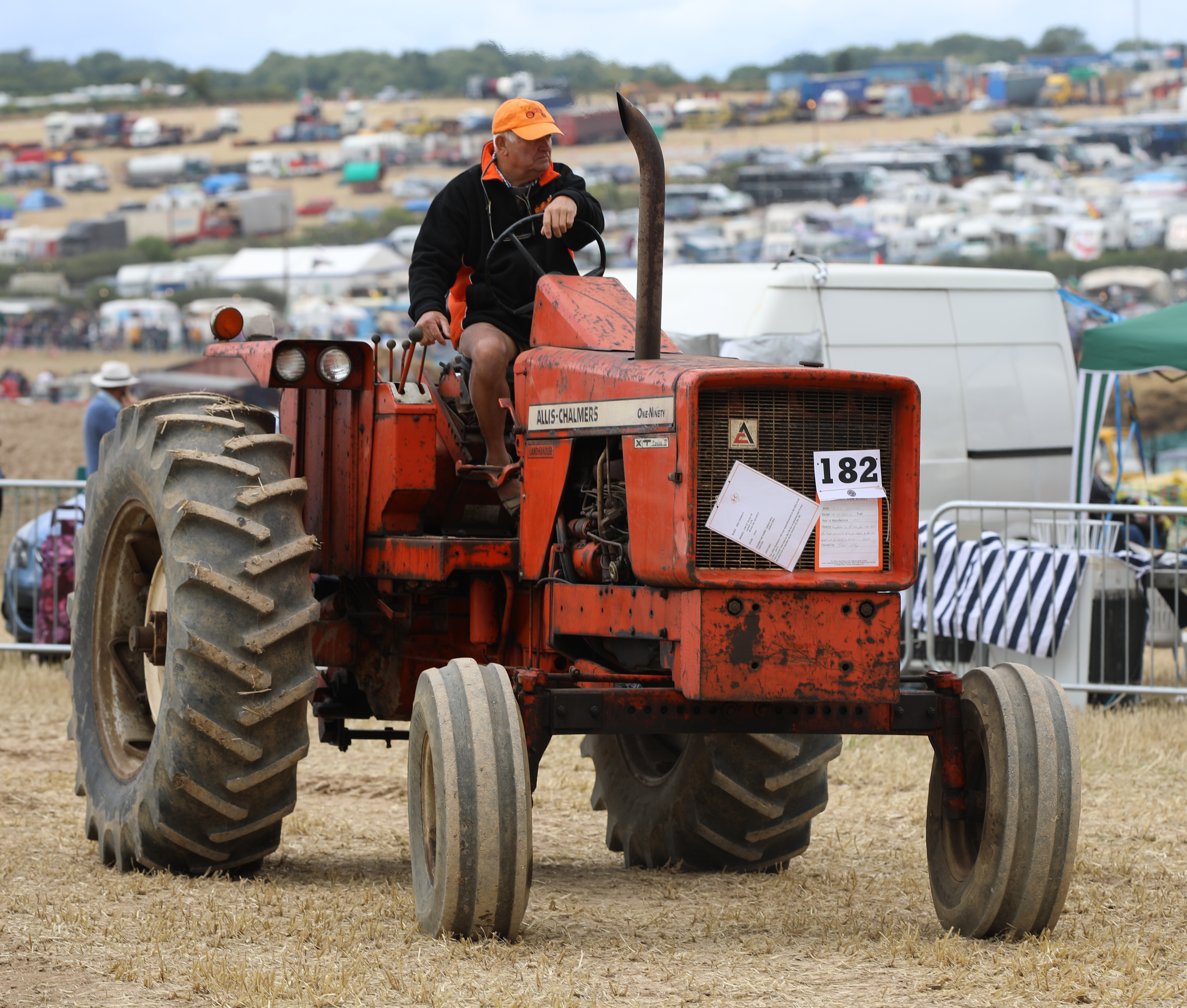

Overview
- Type: Agricultural tractor
- Manufacturer: Allis-Chalmers
- Production: 1964-1971

Powertrain
- Propulsion: Wheels

Dimensions
- Curb weight: 7,675–11,300 lb (3,481–5,126 kg)

The Allis-Chalmers One-Ninety XT, also known as the 190XT, is a row crop tractor produced by Allis-Chalmers from 1964 to 1971. The tractors are powered by diesel fuel, gasoline, or LP gas (though few of the latter two were made). As its model number implies, it was based on the Allis-Chalmers D19 from the D Series, though it featured many alterations and improvements over the D19. The only difference between the 190 and the 190XT is the addition of a turbocharger on the 190XT diesels. Gasoline-run 190XT's also have a G2800 engine as opposed to the 190's G2500 engine. The stock 190XT is rated at about 93 PTO horsepower.

The original price of the tractor was US$8,672. The 190XT was notable for being able to outperform the 103 horsepower Allis-Chalmers D21, until the D21 was turbocharged in 1965. In 1965, cabs were introduced to the 190XT's.

== Details ==
The 190XT had a six cylinder engine and a 3.875 by 4.25 inch bore/stroke. Its displacement was 301 cubic inches and its rated RPMs were 2200. It was tested at 94 power take off and 79 drawbar (haulage) horsepower. The tractor's engine was a new design and, for the time, offered excellent performance for its displacement. Its main transmission, basically a carryover from the D19, had 4 forward and 1 reverse gear and was not synchronized. The 190XT had a power director like the D Series, but it could smoothly shift on the go just like the D series. The main transmission could not be shifted while the PTO was engaged and turning, and as such, the 190 did not offer true live PTO. The tractor could be started and stopped using the power director, but the tractor could not, for example, shuttle from forward to reverse without first stopping the PTO. The power director did split each gear allowing for a total of 8 forward speeds and 2 reverse speeds.

Because it used many D19-size components in its powertrain, it was intended to be at-most a 100-horsepower tractor. However, many of them had their injection pump turned up, pushing them to 120 horsepower or more. This led to various powertrain failures, especially in earlier models due to a light rear end design. An improved design was introduced and many tractors were updated with the heavier duty rear end. Also, the 190's transmission did not tolerate grinding during gear shifting well, and as a result this led to many tractors with transmissions that would not stay in certain gears.

The 190XT was gradually improved and made more powerful, becoming the 190XT Series III and eventually the Model 200. When operated as intended by the manufacturer, the 190 XT was a reliable tractor. However, this meant accepting its limitations.

Despite stiff market competition from the John Deere 4020 and others, Allis did sell many 190XT tractors, and there are many still working today. Over 20,000 were built, which is much higher than most newer Allis-Chalmers post D-Series.

== See also ==
- List of Allis-Chalmers tractors
- List of Allis-Chalmers engines
