= Allis-Chalmers D series =

Line of tractors

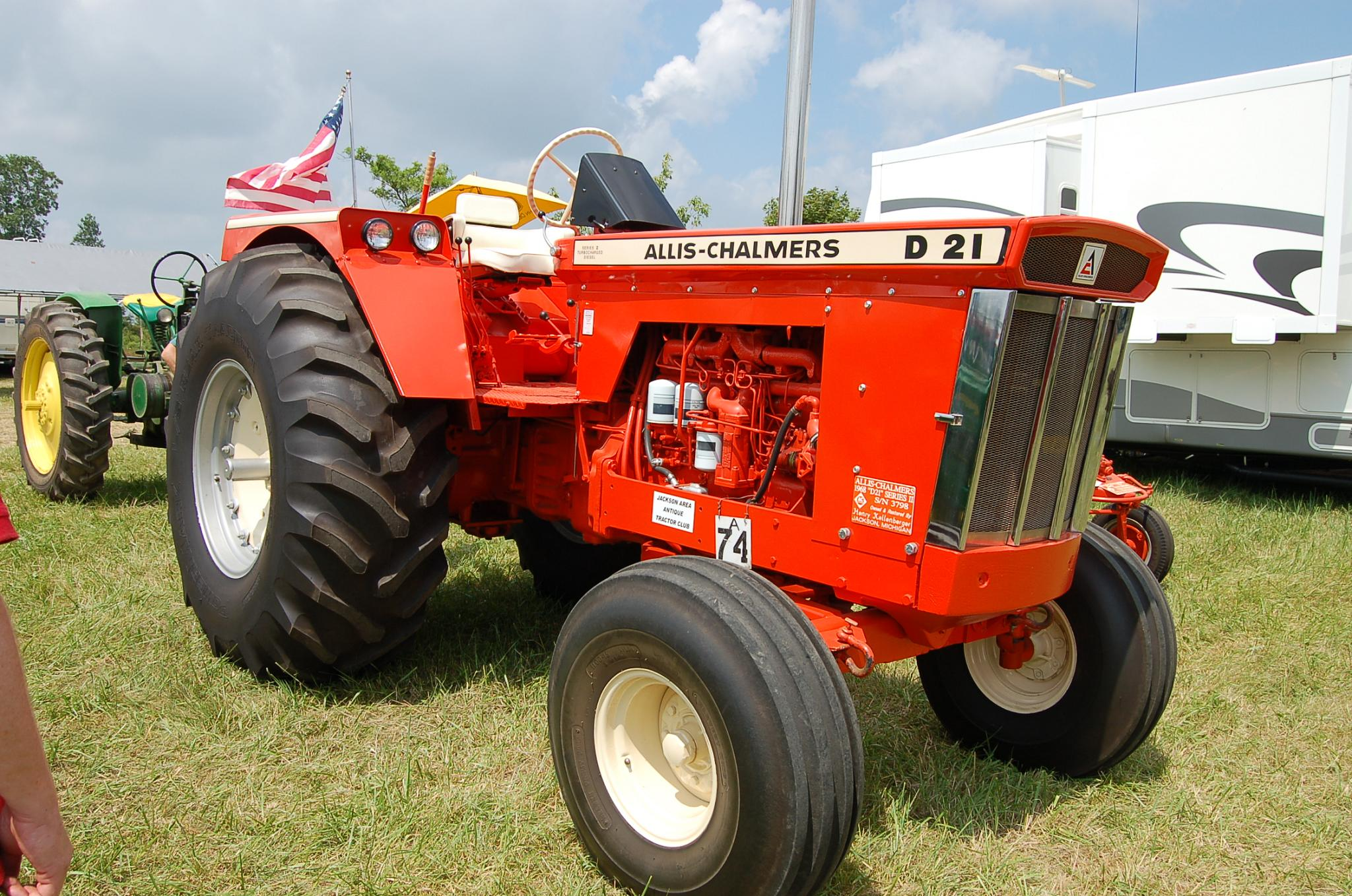
An Allis-Chalmers D21, the largest in the D Series

The Allis-Chalmers D series is a line of tractors made by the Allis-Chalmers Manufacturing Company from 1957 to 1969.

== D-series development ==
An industry trend toward higher horsepower tractors caused Allis-Chalmers to develop the all-new D series to replace earlier tractor lines. These tractors featured three-point hitches, power steering and diesel engine options. Low-compression fuel options for kerosene and distillate were dropped.

Most of the D-series tractors, except for the D21, had hand-operated, shift-on-the-go oil clutches, commonly referred to as a hand clutch. Allis-Chalmers marketed this arrangement as the "Power Director". This clutch was in low range when pulled back, neutral in the middle, and high range when pushed forward. It could also be ordered as a forward-reverser, called the "Shuttle Clutch". This hand clutch also exists on the D21, but it was not meant for shifting on the go.

=== D14 ===
Allis-Chalmers Model D14
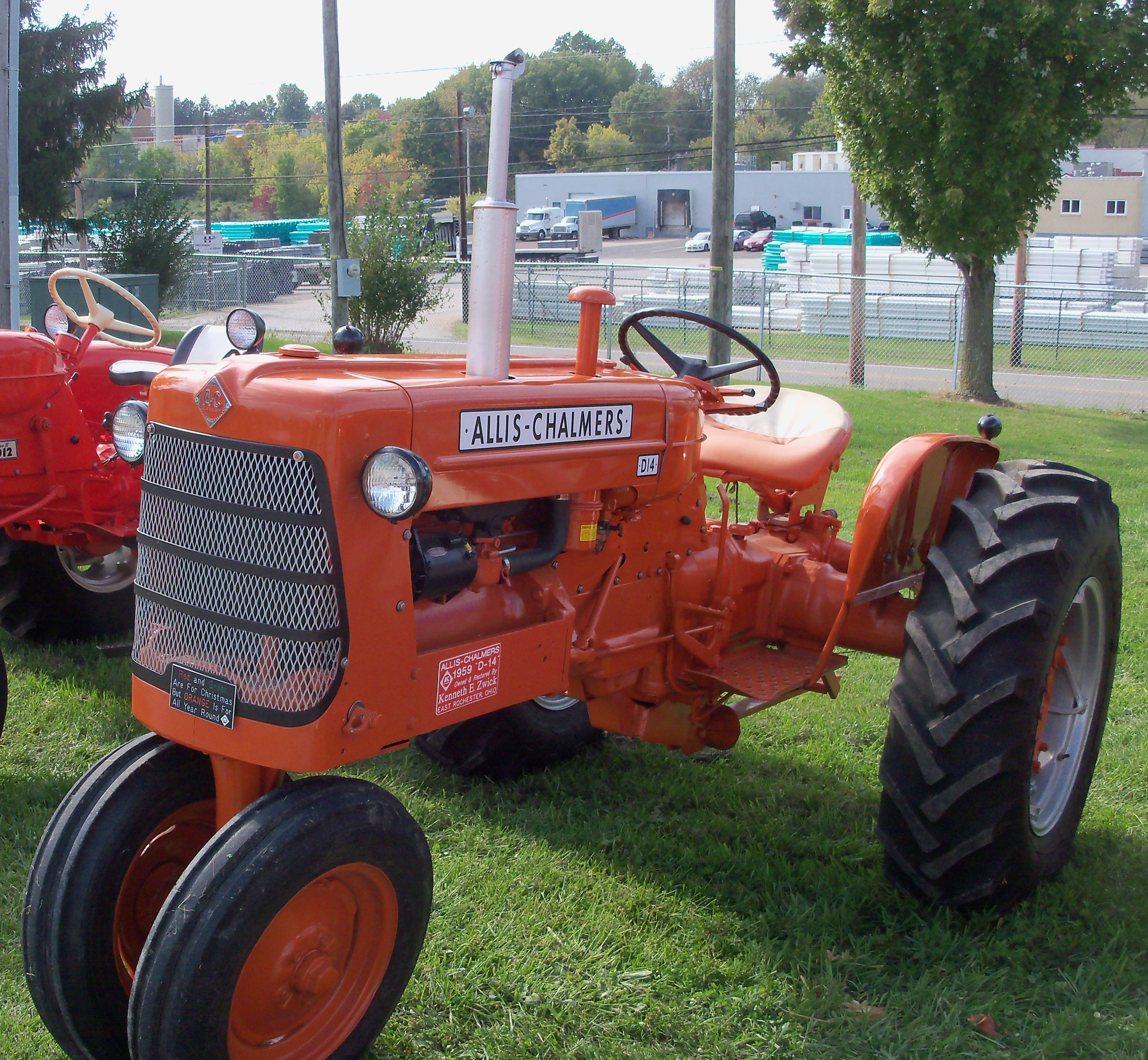
- Allis-Chalmers D14
- Type: Row-crop agricultural tractor
- Manufacturer: Allis-Chalmers
- Production: 1957-1960
- Weight: 4,173 pounds (1,893 kg)
- Propulsion: Rear wheels
- Engine model: Allis-Chalmers 149 cubic inches (2,440 cc) four-cylinder
- Gross power: 37 horsepower (28 kW)
- PTO power: 34.08 horsepower (25.41 kW) (belt)
- Drawbar power: 30.91 horsepower (23.05 kW)
- Drawbar pull: 4,847 pounds (2,199 kg)
- NTTL test: 645
- Preceded by: Allis-Chalmers Model C
- Succeeded by: Allis-Chalmers D15, then 170

The D14 was the first D-series model, introduced in 1957 as an all-new tractor. The engine was a new 149-cubic-inch (2,440 cc) Allis-Chalmers Power-Crater four-cylinder engine, available in gasoline and LP gas fuels. The engine was coupled to a four-speed transmission with a transfer case, giving a total of eight forward gears and two reverse. High-clearance and rice cultivation models were produced, and orchard shield kits were available. An adjustable wide front axle branded "Roll-Shift" was introduced with this model, which also offered a narrow front wheel pair and single wheel options. The D14 had a 14-US-gallon (53 L) gas fuel capacity, and 22.3-US-gallon (84 L) propane fuel capacity. The D14 was made from 1957 to 1960, when it was replaced by the D-15. 17,474 units were made.

=== D15 ===
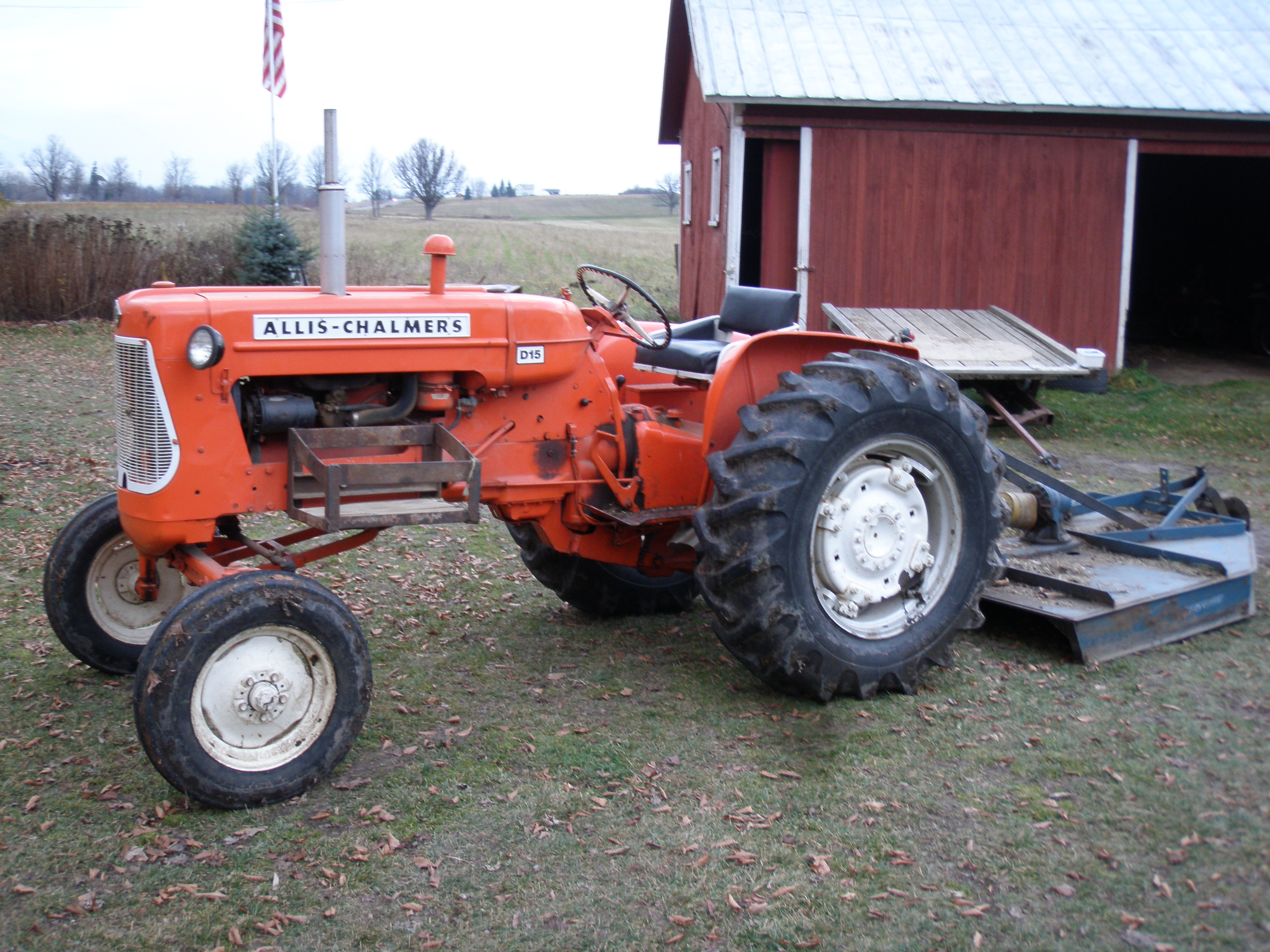
D15

The D15 succeeded the D14 in the Allis-Chalmers lineup from 1960 to 1968. The early D15 was essentially the same as the D14 with the same engine but a higher compression ratio and increased RPMs. The option of power steering was also made available. At serial number 9001 a larger engine was introduced, as well as a few other minor improvements. The D15 had a 16-US-gallon (61 L) fuel capacity for gas and diesel, and a 15.75-US-gallon (59.6 L) capacity for LP gas. Dual and single front wheels and an adjustable front row-crop axle were offered. 17,434 units were built during their production from 1960 to 1969, with a price of $3,000 in 1967.

The D15 Series II was introduced in 1963 with new 165-cubic-inch (2,700 cc) engines in diesel, gasoline and LPG, with about 15 more power for the gasoline and LPG models. Diesel was unchanged. Headlights were moved from the grille to the fenders.

The introduction of the Renault-built Model 160 ended the D15 Series II in 1969.

=== D17 ===
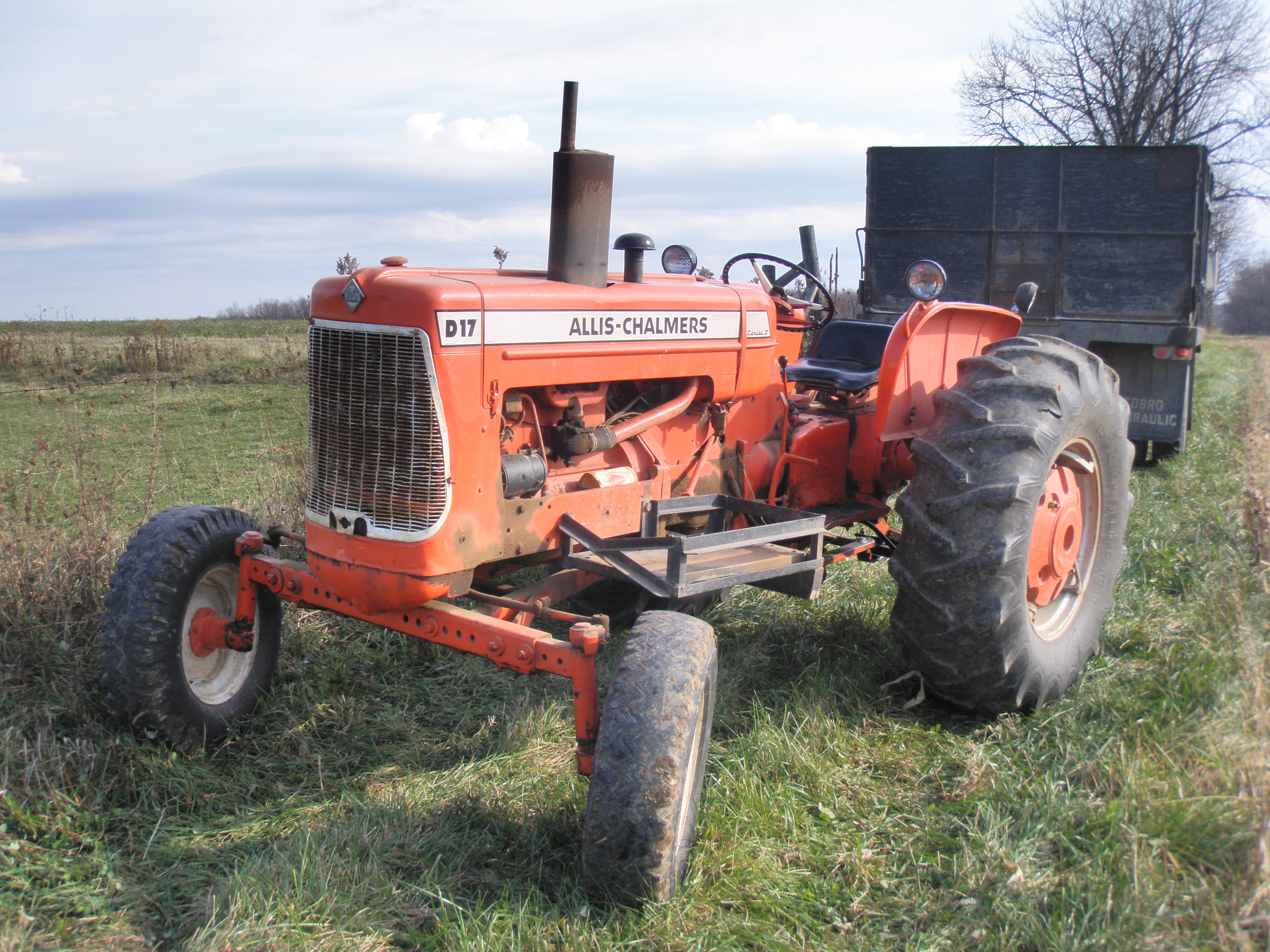
D17

In October 1957, the D-17 was introduced, followed by the D10 and the D12 in 1959, in which year Allis-Chalmers made as many as 50 model configurations of the D10, 12, 14, and 17.

The Model D17 was developed as a replacement for the WD45 as a four-plow tractor. The D17's styling closely followed the smaller D14. It was made in gas, diesel, and LPG versions, its 226-cubic-inch (3,700 cc) engine turned 2,000 rpm, and was tested at 52.6 horsepower (39.2 kW) belt and 46 horsepower (34 kW) drawbar. Adjustable wide front, narrow dual and single front wheel options were offered, as well as a high-clearance model with a single front wheel. Wheatland models with full rear fenders and orchard models with orchard shielding were developed as well. An even taller high-clearance version was offered for sugar cane work. Later years were designated Series II through Series IV, with minimal changes. 62,867 D-17s were produced during their 10-year run. The diesel D17 had a six-cylinder engine with 262 cubic inches (4,290 cc) and weighed about 4,660 pounds (2,110 kg). The Allis-Chalmers 170 replaced the D17 in 1968.

=== D10 ===
Allis-Chalmers Model D10
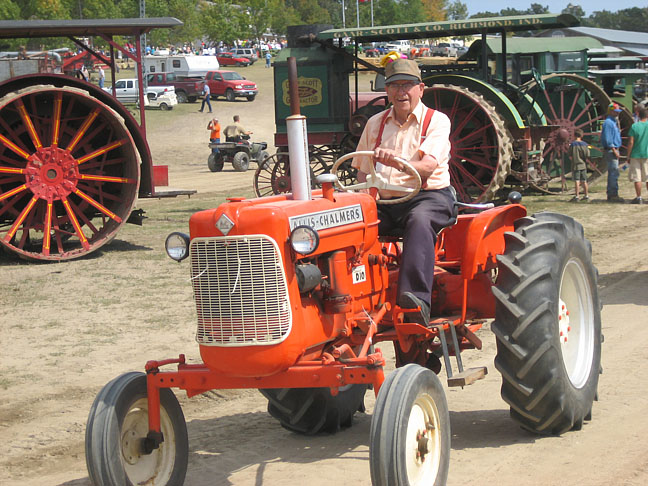
- Allis-Chalmers D10
- Type: Row-crop agricultural tractor
- Manufacturer: Allis-Chalmers
- Production: 1959-1967
- Weight: 4,173 pounds (1,893 kg)
- Propulsion: Rear wheels
- Engine model: Allis-Chalmers 138.7 cubic inches (2,273 cc) four-cylinder
- Gross power: 31 horsepower (23 kW)
- PTO power: 28.51 horsepower (21.26 kW)
- Drawbar power: 27.73 horsepower (20.68 kW)
- Drawbar pull: 3,555 pounds (1,613 kg)
- NTTL test: 724
- Preceded by: Allis-Chalmers Model B and CA
- Succeeded by: Allis-Chalmers D12, then 170

The D10 replaced the Model B and were not made with narrow front-ends. Their wide front ends were adjustable. Both models (D10 and D12) were tested at 28.5 belt and 25.8 drawbar horsepower and had 138.7 cubic inches (2,273 cc) engines; the only difference between the two was that the D12 had longer front-axle sleeves and a wider front axle adjustment for wider rows. 5,304 D10s were made from 1959 to 1967.

=== D12 ===
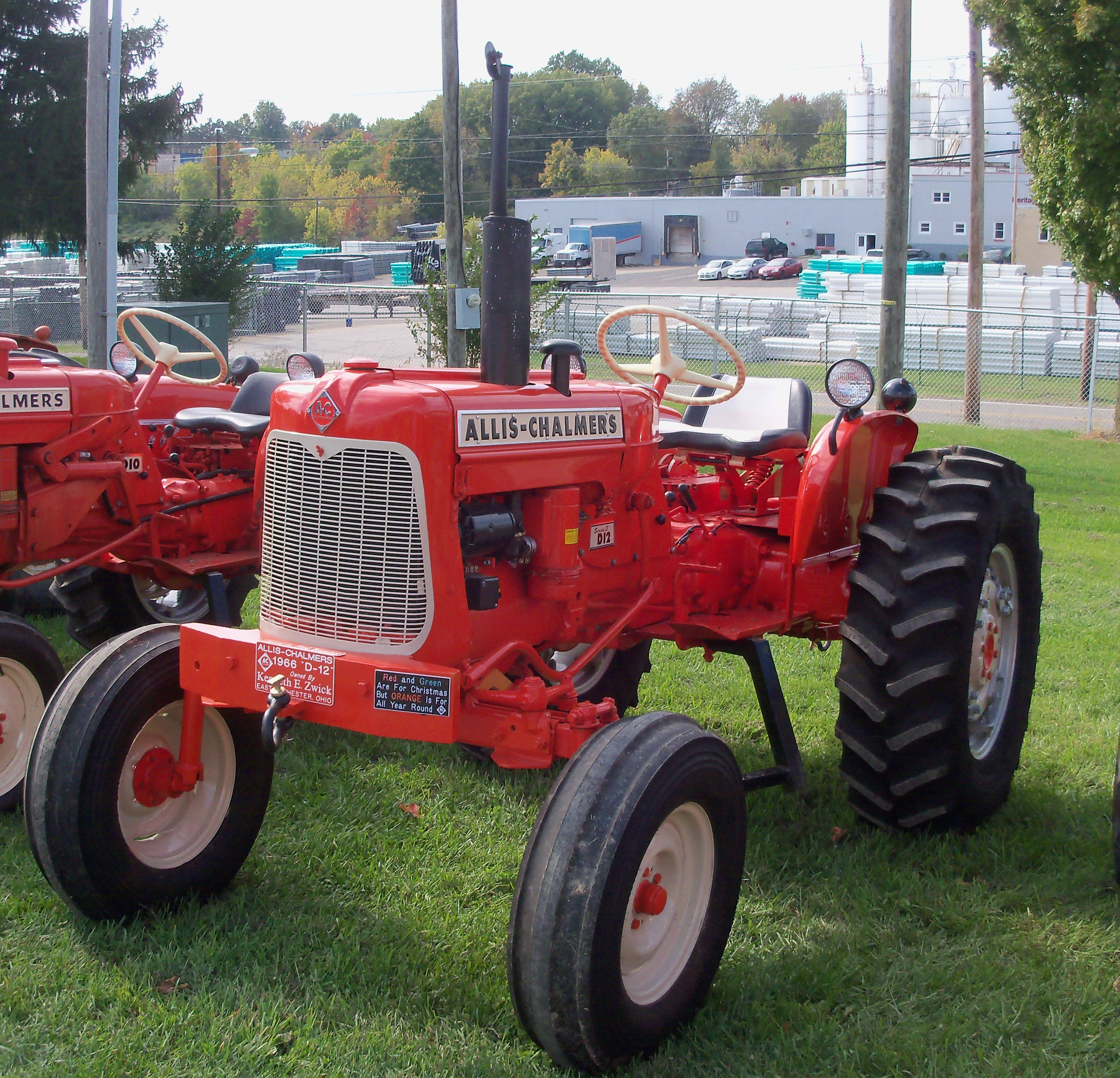
1966 D 12 series II

The D12 replaced the Model CA in 1959. 4,070 D12's were made in their 10-year run from 1959 to 1968. The D12 had a 138.7 cubic inches (2,273 cc), four-cylinder, 31 horsepower (23 kW) gasoline engine that was tested in Nebraska at 29.43 drawbar horsepower (21.95 kW).

=== D19 ===
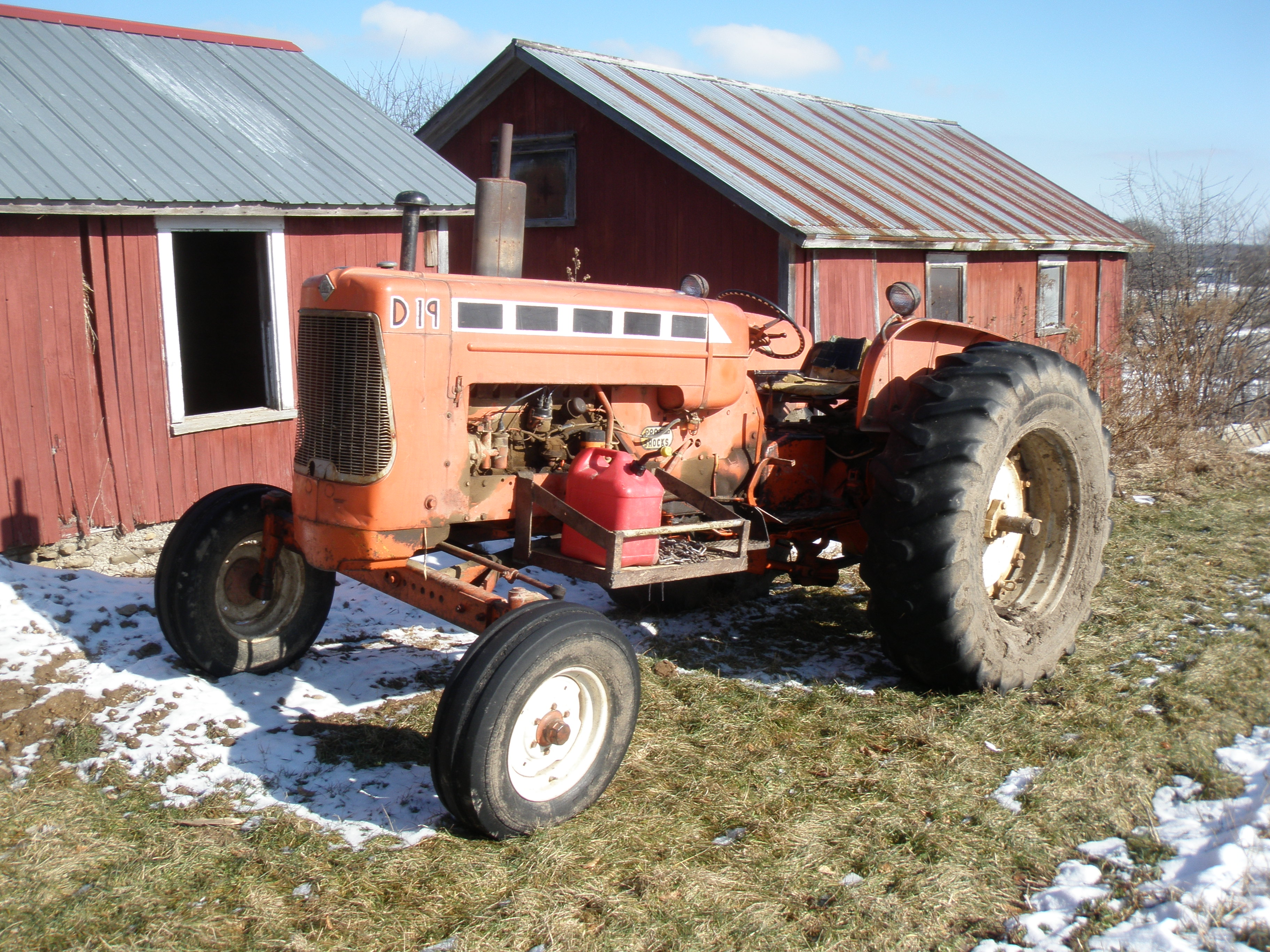

The D19 was introduced in 1961 to suit the needs of larger farmers. It was the first D-series tractor besides the diesel D17 to have a six-cylinder engine. Its horsepower was: 71.54 hp (53.35 kW) gas; 66.19 hp (49.36 kW) propane, and 66.92 hp (49.90 kW) diesel. Its displacement was 262 cubic inches (4,290 cc). The diesel model was the first in the industry to come standard with a turbocharger, boosting both horsepower and fuel economy. 10,591 units were built, and they weighed 6,650 to 6,840 pounds (3,020 to 3,100 kg). The D19 was manufactured until 1964. D19s were known for running smoothly and fairly quietly.

The D19 was popular among larger farmers in the 1960s, who had a higher acreage to manpower ratio than ever before. The D19 was able to pull a five bottom plow. It also came in a high-crop version with over three feet (37 inches [940 mm]) of ground clearance.

=== D21 ===
The D21 was introduced in 1963, and was the largest of the D series, as well as the first Allis-Chalmers tractor to exceed 100 horsepower and the largest row crop tractor available in the industry; rated at 103 horsepower (77 kW) with a 7.0 litres (430 cu in) engine. The D21 was styled significantly different than the other D series with full fenders, a large platform, and a rear-mounted fuel tank which held 52 US gallons (200 L), allowing an average of 10 hours of field work. The D21 was not turbocharged until 1965, which pushed its horsepower up to about 128 hp (95 kW) as it remained the largest row crop tractor available. This gave the D21 over 15,000 pounds (6,800 kg) of pull, making it the largest tractor Allis-Chalmers had ever made, as well as the most expensive at around 10,000 dollars.

Before this move to turbo, the D21 series I found itself outmoded by the Allis-Chalmers 190XT, which could be turned up to produce more power than the D21. The D21 was replaced in 1970 by the Model 210 and Two-Twenty, also with a 7 litres (427 cu in) engine, which was rated at 122.4 and 135.95 horsepower (91.27 and 101.38 kW) respectively. The D21 was a favorite for tractor pullers and still makes good showings at the pulls today.

== See also ==
- List of Allis-Chalmers tractors
- List of Allis-Chalmers engines
