= Gleaner A85 =

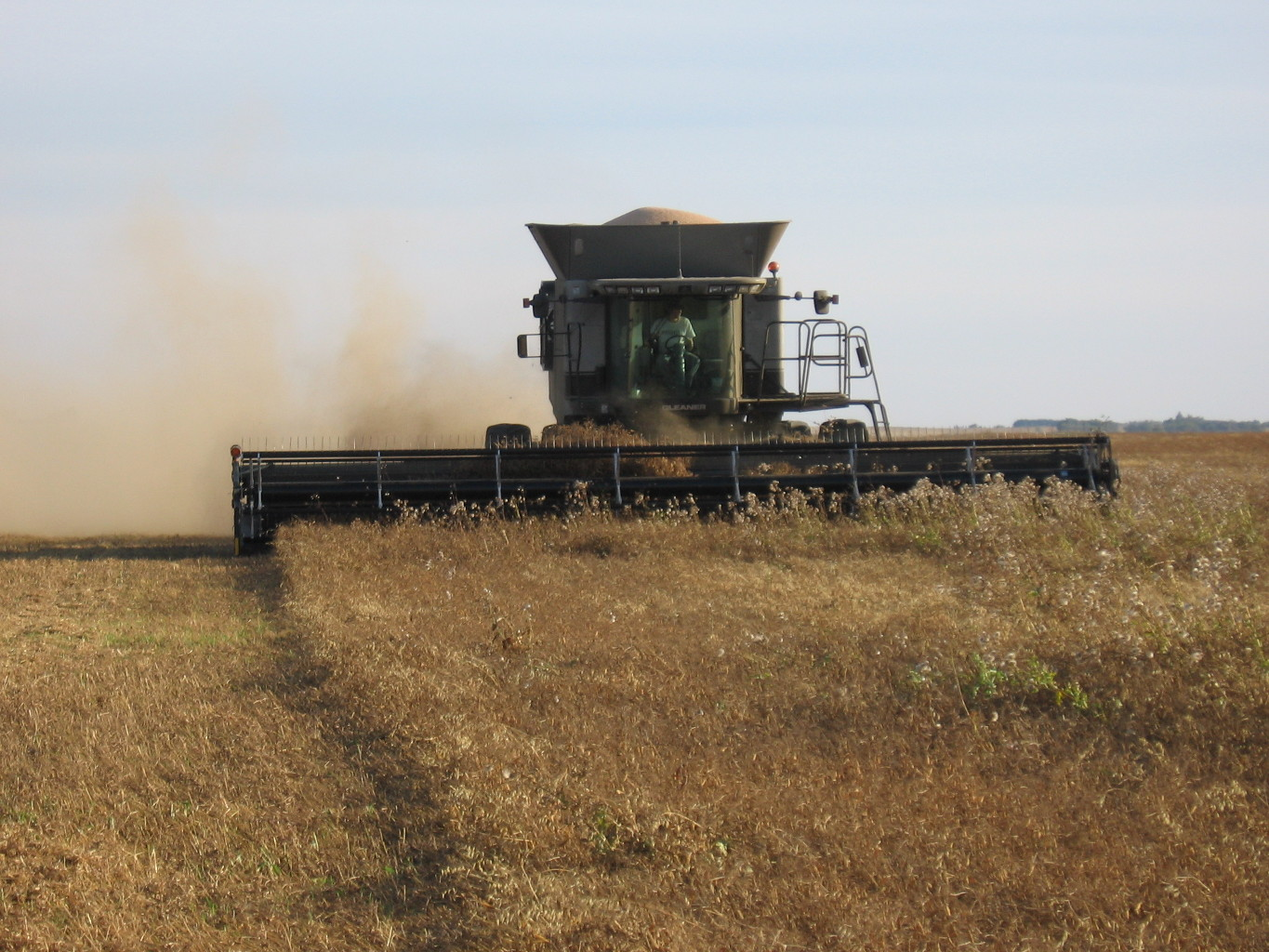
Allis-Chalmers GLEANER A85

The A85 is a Class 8 combine harvester made by Gleaner Manufacturing Company, a division of AGCO. The A85 is the largest Gleaner has made, with a 350-US-bushel (12,000 L; 2,800 US dry gal; 2,700 imp gal) bin capacity, which it can unload in less than 90 seconds; unloading 4.5 US bsh (160 L; 36 US dry gal; 35 imp gal) per second. The A85 was produced from 2006 to 2008.

The A85's engine is a 763 cubic inches (12.50 L) inline 6-cylinder 459 horsepower (342 kW) turbocharged Caterpillar diesel C13 engine copupled to a 4-speed hydrostatic rotor drive train.

== See also ==
- Gleaner Manufacturing Company
- Gleaner E
- AGCO
