= Caterpillar C13 =

Overview
- Manufacturer: Caterpillar Incorporated

Layout
- Configuration: I6
- Displacement: 12,500 cubic centimetres (760 cu in)
- Cylinder bore: 130 millimetres (5.1 in)
- Piston stroke: 157 millimetres (6.2 in)
- Compression ratio: 17:1

RPM range
- Idle speed: 650
- Max. engine speed: 2800

Combustion
- Turbocharger: single with non-ACERT engines, sequential twin turbochargers used with ACERT engines
- Fuel system: unit injection (see management)
- Management: electronic (ACERT) with mechanical failsafe
- Fuel type: diesel
- Oil system: wet sump
- Cooling system: water cooled

Output
- Power output: 387 kilowatts (519 hp) (marine/military rating)
- Torque output: 1,075-1,756 lb-ft

Dimensions
- Dry weight: 1.35 tonnes (1.33 long tons; 1.49 short tons)

Chronology
- Predecessor: Caterpillar C12
- Successor: Caterpillar C13D

The Caterpillar C13 is an inline-6 diesel internal combustion engine made by Caterpillar. The engine has 12.5 litres (760 cu in) displacement and 5.12 in × 6.18 in (130 mm × 157 mm) cylinders (bore × stroke). Engine ratings were available from 380 to 525 hp (285 to 390 kW) at 2100 RPM. The peak torque occurs at an engine speed of 1200 RPM.

The engine weighs over one ton at 2,610 lb (1,180 kg). The Cat C13 is often used in Class 8 trucks and highway coaches. It is also used in large agricultural equipment and fire trucks, where it is rated at a higher horsepower.

== Sample applications ==
- Caterpillar 345C L excavator
- Caterpillar 730 articulated dump truck and chassis
- Caterpillar 730 EJ articulated dump truck
- Caterpillar 735 articulated dump truck and chassis
- Freightliner Century Class truck
- Gleaner A85 combine harvester
- Harimau tank
- Sisu E13TP military truck
- Kenworth W900 truck

== See also ==
- Caterpillar C27
