= Allis-Chalmers Model WC =

Tractor made by Allis-Chalmers

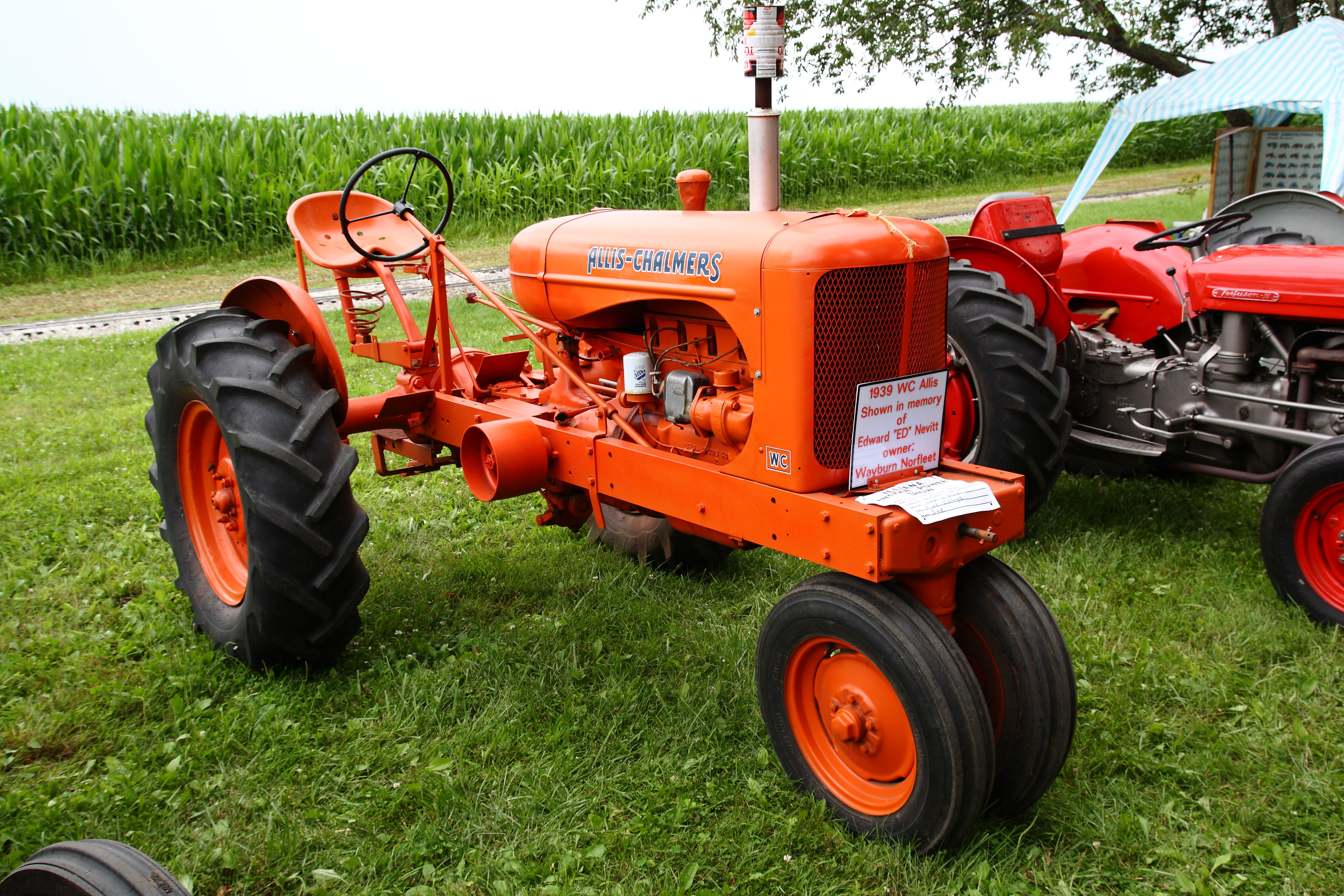
A 1939 Model WC.

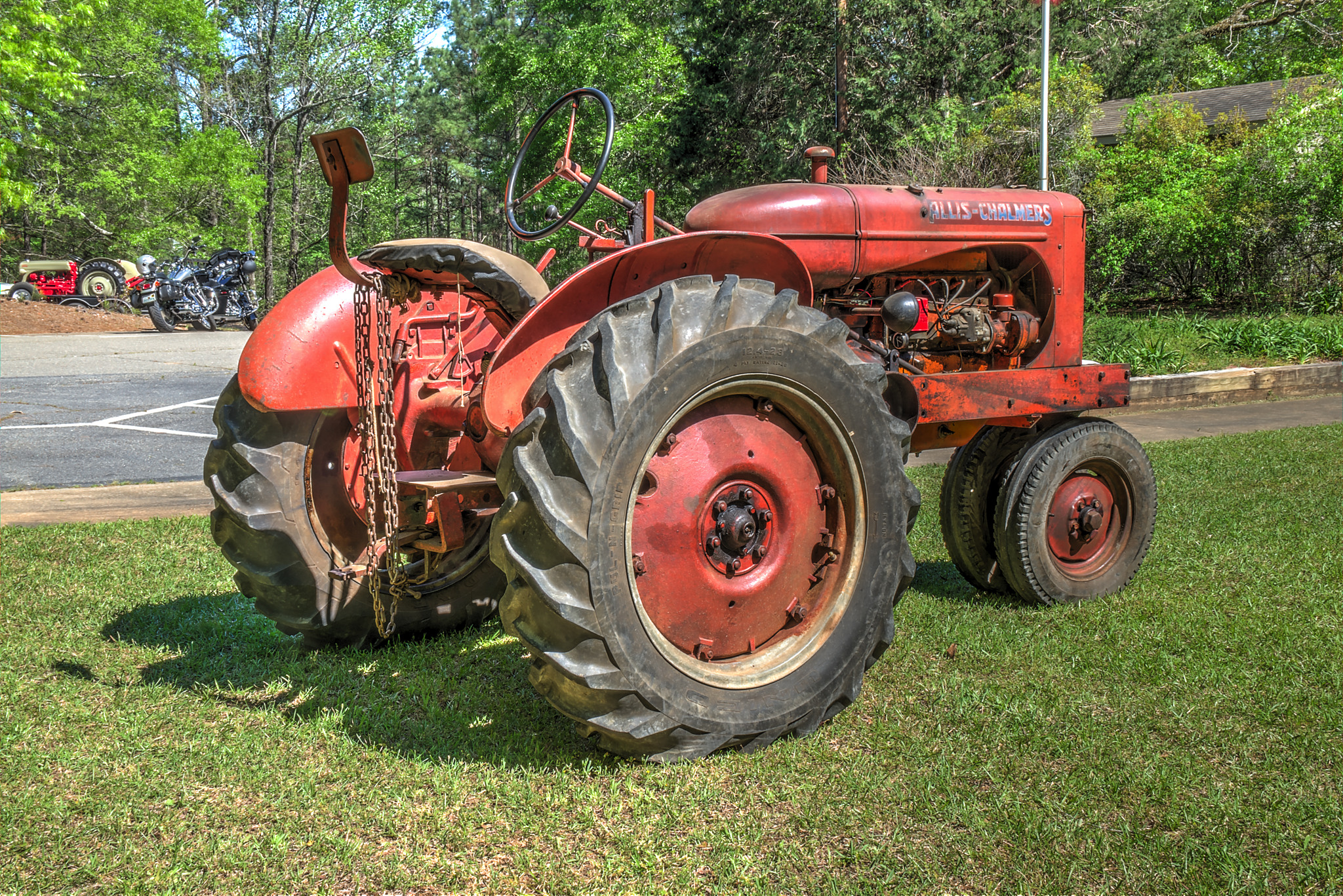
1942 Model WC at Jarrell Plantation

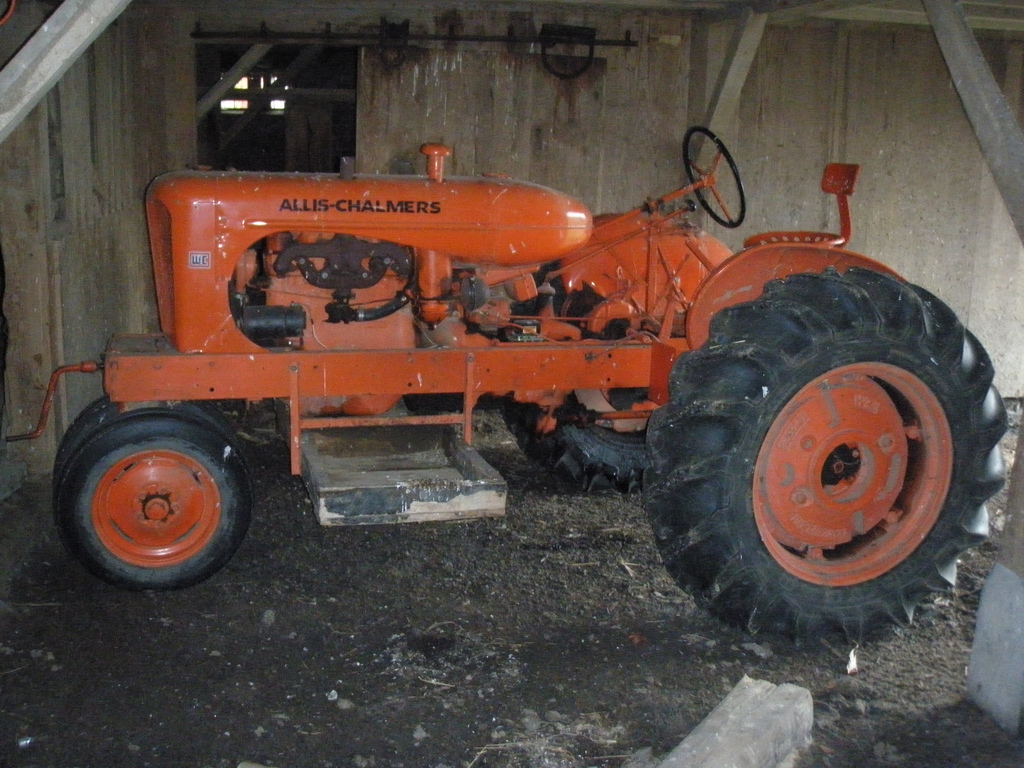
A 1947 Model WC.

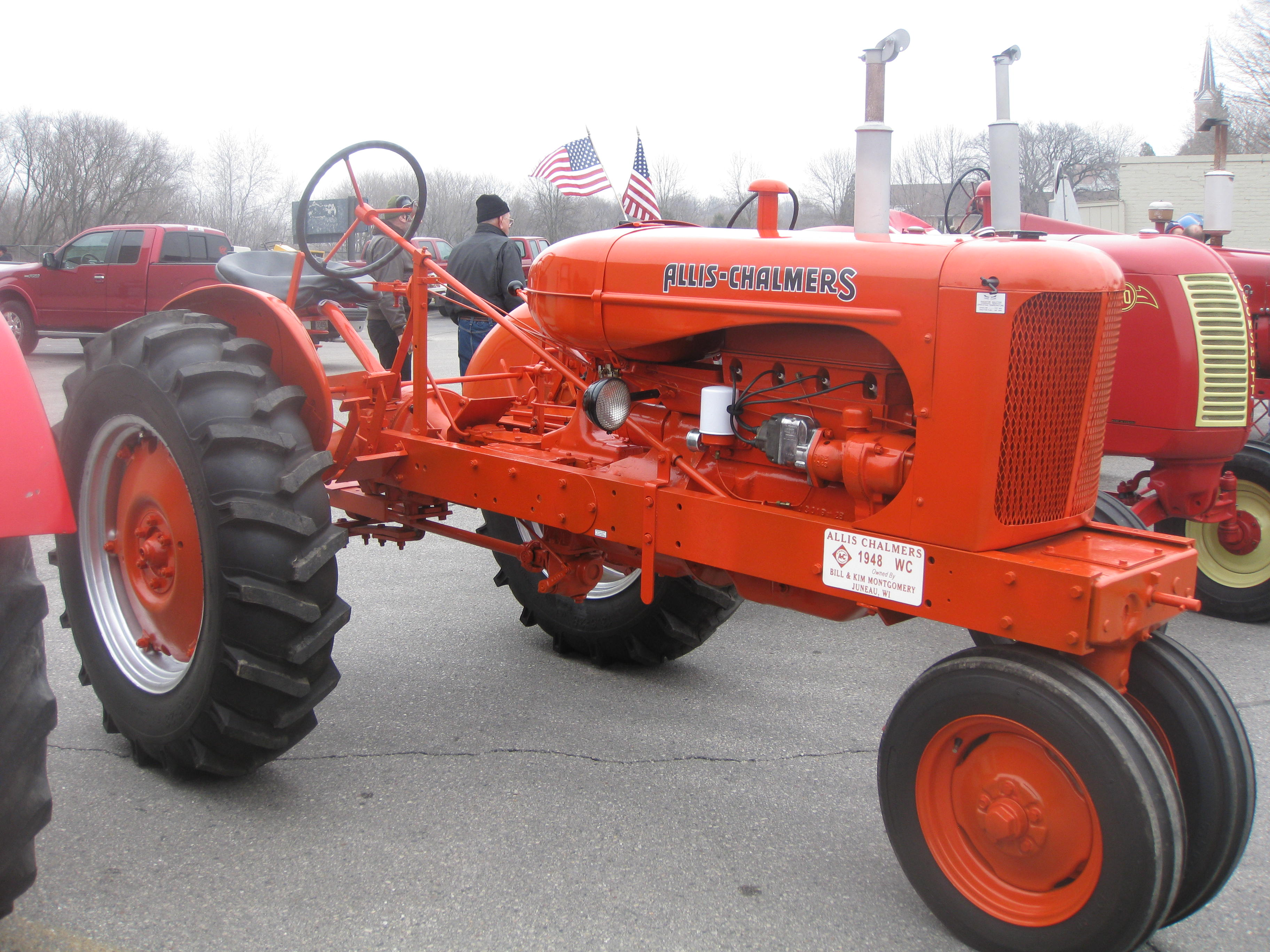
A 1948 Model WC.

The Model WC was a tractor made by Allis-Chalmers from 1933 to 1948. The WC was designed from its start as a nimble, low-cost, but well-powered row-crop tractor that would make the best use of pneumatic rubber tires, which Allis-Chalmers had just introduced to agriculture in 1932. A successful model at the historical height of row-crop tractor demand, the WC was the best-selling tractor model that Allis-Chalmers ever built.

The WC was the Model W variant tailored to cultivating, thus the W + C (for "cultivating") name. Other W variants, such as the WD and WF, followed later (in lower numbers).

The WC was popular in the Great Depression for its good value, affordable price, and frugal design elements. Two factors that lowered its cost of manufacture, and thus its sales price, were that it was made partially from off-the-shelf components, and that its steel channel iron frame eliminated the need for large, heavy castings for the transmission and rear end (as were often used in tractors of the era). Its power was ample for the time and class, allowing it to pull a two-bottom plow.

== Production and pricing ==
With its minimalist design and low price, about 178,000 WCs were made from 1934 to 1948. The WC was assembled at the West Allis, Wisconsin, plant, near Milwaukee. In 1934, the WC was listed at US$825 on rubber (standard), US$675 on steel (optional). By 1936, the prices were US$960 and US$785, respectively. The tractor could also be ordered as "air front", meaning rubber tires in front and steel wheels in back.

== Features and configurations ==
=== Engine ===
The WC had a 201 cubic inches (3,290 cc), inline-four engine. Like most tractors of the era, the WC offered multifuel capability, running on gasoline, kerosene, or alcohol, and featured a small auxiliary fuel tank in addition to the larger main fuel tank, so that the tractor could be started on gasoline when cold and, once warmed up, switched to kerosene or alcohol.

The engine's 4 in (100 mm) bore and 4 in (100 mm) stroke made it one of the first tractor engines (to Buescher's knowledge, the first) to be square or oversquare, that is, to have an equal or shorter stroke than bore. The WC engine tested at 22 horsepower at the drawbar and 30 at the belt. Its "snappy governor […] seemed to sense a heavy load, even before the load arrived."

Ignition was by magneto.

=== Rubber tires ===
The WC was the first farm tractor to have rubber tires as standard equipment, and the first tractor tested on rubber in the Nebraska tractor tests. The pneumatic-rubber-tire-on-steel-wheel combination was more expensive to make than a steel wheel with cleats. To make rubber tires standard equipment while also keeping the cost of the tractor low, the WC's designers, C.E. Frudden and Walter Strehlow, gave the WC drop gearing at the rear (bull-gear-with-pinion final drives), which allowed row-crop ground clearance while having smaller-diameter drive wheels. Drop gearing had appeared many times before on earlier tractors, but never yet for this new reason—to minimize the amount of rubber needed for the tires.

=== Front axle options ===
Like other row-crop tractors from various makers, the WC could be ordered in both tricycle (narrow tread) and wide tread (that is, wide front track) versions, with the tricycle configuration by far the most popular. The tractor could be ordered as "air front", meaning rubber tires in front and steel wheels in back.

=== Electric starter and lights ===
In 1939 Harry Merritt, an Allis-Chalmers executive, decided that, with over 90 percent of WCs selling with the optional electric starter and lights, these features would henceforth be standard equipment. Thus the WC became one of the earliest farm tractors (to Buescher's knowledge, the first) to have starter and lights as standard equipment.

=== Other options ===
A belt pulley was standard equipment on the WC, while a power take-off (PTO) and a mechanical power lift for the cultivator were optional. In 1936 the PTO option's list price was USD $50, the power lift option's, $35.

The PTO was necessary if the buyer was planning to use the WC to pull the Allis-Chalmers All-Crop Harvester, a pull-type combine. The combination of a WC tractor pulling an All-Crop Harvester combine was a huge commercial success for Allis from the mid-1930s through mid-1940s.

=== Design changes ===
Various design changes occurred over the model's lifespan:

- The prototypes were built with Waukesha engines. Mass production began with the WC's own in-house 4"x4" engine design.
- As in the rest of the farm tractor industry, the mid through late 1930s was the time when Allis-Chalmers's tractors went from "unstyled" to "styled". The major manufacturers hired industrial designers (in Allis's case, Brooks Stevens) to style their tractors with streamlined sheet metal (and in some cases revised operator controls with better usability). In 1938, the WC was styled and was given a larger radiator and tires.
- In 1939, electric starter and lights went from optional to standard.

== Drawbacks ==
The WC, with many good features and various first-to-market attributes, had at least a few drawbacks. Its clutch was not particularly well designed, and, like other tractors of the 1920s through mid-1930s, it lacked usability in the design of its brake controls, with a hand lever on each side of the tractor, which meant that applying the brakes took the operator's hands away from other controls. Other tractors had foot pedals on both sides, but that meant that the clutch and left brake could not be operated simultaneously. The solution came in the late 30s, when various brands moved both brake pedals to the right foot.

== See also ==
- List of Allis-Chalmers tractors

== Bibliography ==
- Buescher, Walter M. (1991), Plow Peddler, Macomb, Illinois, USA: Glenbridge Publishing, ISBN 978-0-944435-18-2. A memoir by a man who worked for Allis-Chalmers company for over 30 years as a sales representative and sales manager.
- Sanders, Ralph W. (1996), Vintage farm tractors: the ultimate tribute to classic tractors, Stillwater, Minnesota, USA: Town Square Books, ISBN 978-0896582804.
