= Allis-Chalmers Model C =

Row crop tractor

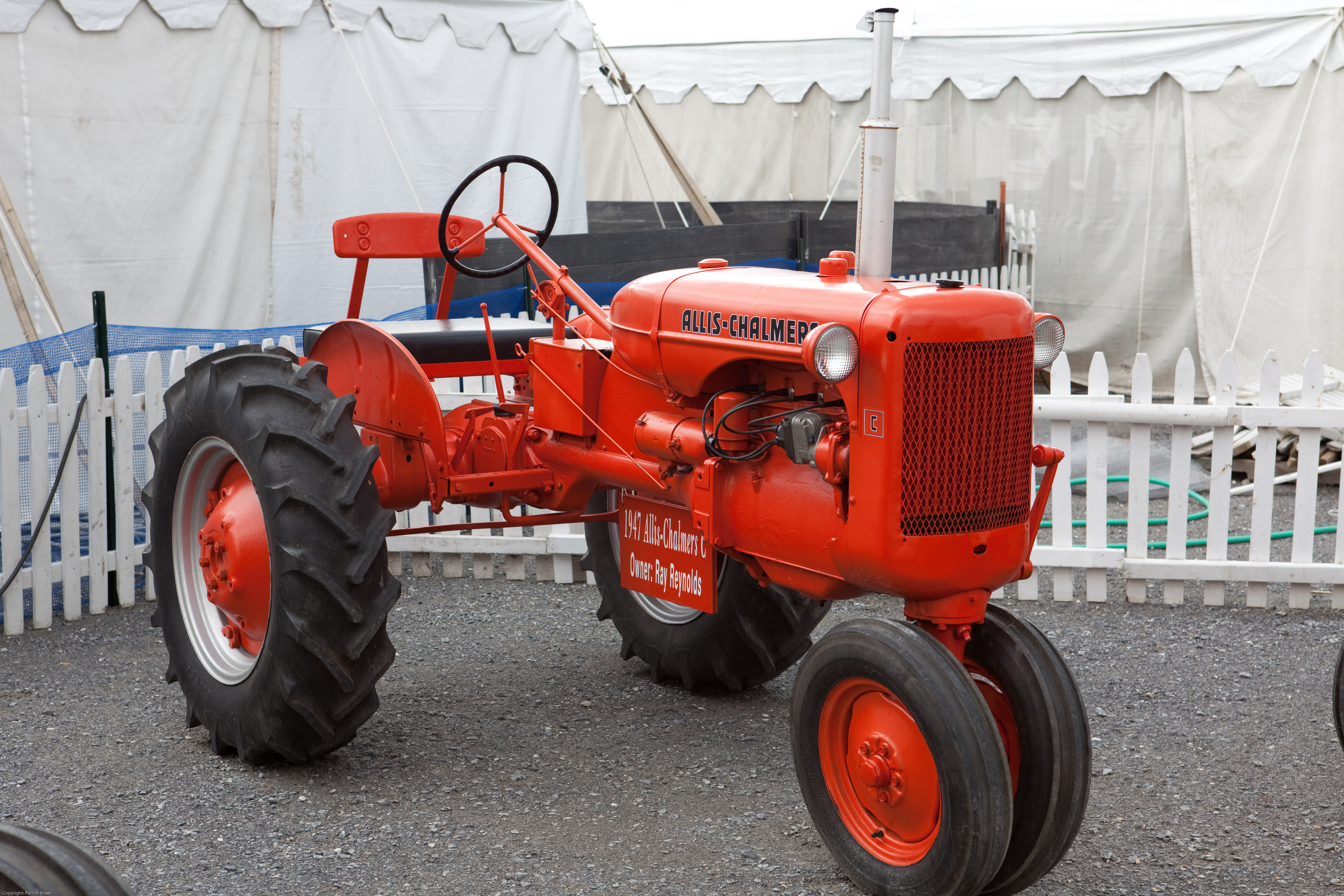
- 1947 Allis-Chalmers C
- Type: Row-crop agricultural tractor
- Manufacturer: Allis-Chalmers
- Production: 1940-1949
- Length: 110.25 in (280.0 cm)
- Height: 76.75 in (194.9 cm)
- Weight: 2,500 pounds (1,100 kg) (base)
- Propulsion: Rear wheels
- Engine model: Allis-Chalmers CE
- Gross power: 21 horsepower (16 kW)
- PTO power: 23.3 horsepower (17.4 kW) (belt)
- Drawbar power: 18.4 horsepower (13.7 kW)
- Drawbar pull: 2,368 pounds (1,074 kg)
- NTTL test: 363
- Succeeded by: Allis-Chalmers Model CA

The Allis-Chalmers Model C was a small row-crop tractor manufactured by Allis-Chalmers from 1940 to 1949. It was developed from the smaller Allis-Chalmers Model B.

== Description and production ==
The Model B was too small to work two crop rows at once. Allis-Chalmers briefly adapted the Allis-Chalmers Model WC as the RC from 1938 to 1941, but it proved expensive, so the B was adapted with wider wheel spacing options, a larger engine, and additional fuel options. The Model C used the RC's 125-cubic-inch (2,050 cc) Allis-Chalmers 4-cylinder engine, with gasoline and distillate fuel options. The C inherited the B's three-speed transmission, power take-off and hydraulics.

84,020 Model Cs were built at the Allis-Chalmers plant in West Allis, Wisconsin. In 1949 a Model C sold for about $1,200.

== Model CA ==
Starting in 1949, the Model C was replaced by the Model CA, with greater power, allowing it to be rated as a two-plow tractor. The engine remained the same, but turned at a higher RPM and had a higher degree or compression, yielding 11 percent more power. It was provided with a new four-speed transmission, and power assist rear wheel adjustment was introduced. The CA was produced with single and narrow dual wheel front ends, and an adjustable wide front axle.

39,499 CAs were produced at West Allis until 1958, with a 1958 price of about $1,900.
