= All-Crop harvester =

The All-Crop harvester or All-Crop combine was a tractor-drawn, PTO-driven (except the All-Crop 100 and the All-Crop SP100) combine harvesters made by Allis-Chalmers from the mid-1930s to the early 1960s. Aside from small grains, these harvesters were able to harvest some flowers, as well as various grasses and legume crops for seed.

The first combines under that name, the All-Crop 60, had a 60-inch, sickle-bar cutting head, and the popular Model 66 had a 66-inch cutting head.

Many of these units are still in working condition, and they are well known for their dependability and low maintenance; however, as they are quite small machines (and now very old), they are not practical on today's large farms. They were superseded by the Allis-Chalmers Gleaner combine harvesters.

== All-Crop 40 ==
Specifically designed for the Allis Chalmers Model B and C tractors, this model had a 38-inch cut and could harvest approximately one acre per hour. Produced from 1938 to 1940; only about 15,000 made.

== All-Crop 60 ==
Five foot (60-inch) cut; replaced flat belt with Texrope V-belt system. Produced from 1935 to 1949, with over 100,000 produced, this was by far the most popular All-Crop model. Harry C. Merritt and Charles J. Scranton each earned the prestigious Cyrus Hall McCormick Medal of the American Society of Agricultural Engineers for their work on the design of this machine.

== All-Crop 60A ==
Introduced in 1950 as a slightly improved Model 60, this model was only made until 1952, with about 75,000 built.

== All-Crop 66 ==
Introduced in 1953 as successor to the 60A, this model featured a 6-inch greater cut than its predecessor. It was on this model that Allis-Chalmers introduced their "Big-Bin" model, which held 25 versus 18 bushels. Produced for six years, 72,839 of this model were built.

== All-Crop 72 ==
On this model, a new header design was implemented; an auger feed instead of a canvas conveyor. Produced from 1959 to 1969, approximately 75,000 of these were built.

== All-Crop 90 ==
The largest pull-type All-Crop, this model had a seven and a half foot header and was matched to the Allis-Chalmers D-series tractors. Produced from 1957 to 1960, about 7,540 units of this model produced.

== All-Crop 100 ==
Powered by an Allis W-226 engine, the 100 could be equipped with a 9-foot or 12-foot header. Weighing in at 6,760 lbs, 4,500 units of this machine were produced from 1953 to 1957. It was replaced by the Super 100 model in 1958.

== All-Crop SP100 ==
Essentially the same as the All-Crop 100, the Super 100 had a few more luxuries. It was replaced by the Gleaner series when Allis acquired the Gleaner Harvester Corp. Built only in 1958, there were approximately 1,000 of these machines produced.
