= Allis-Chalmers ED40 =

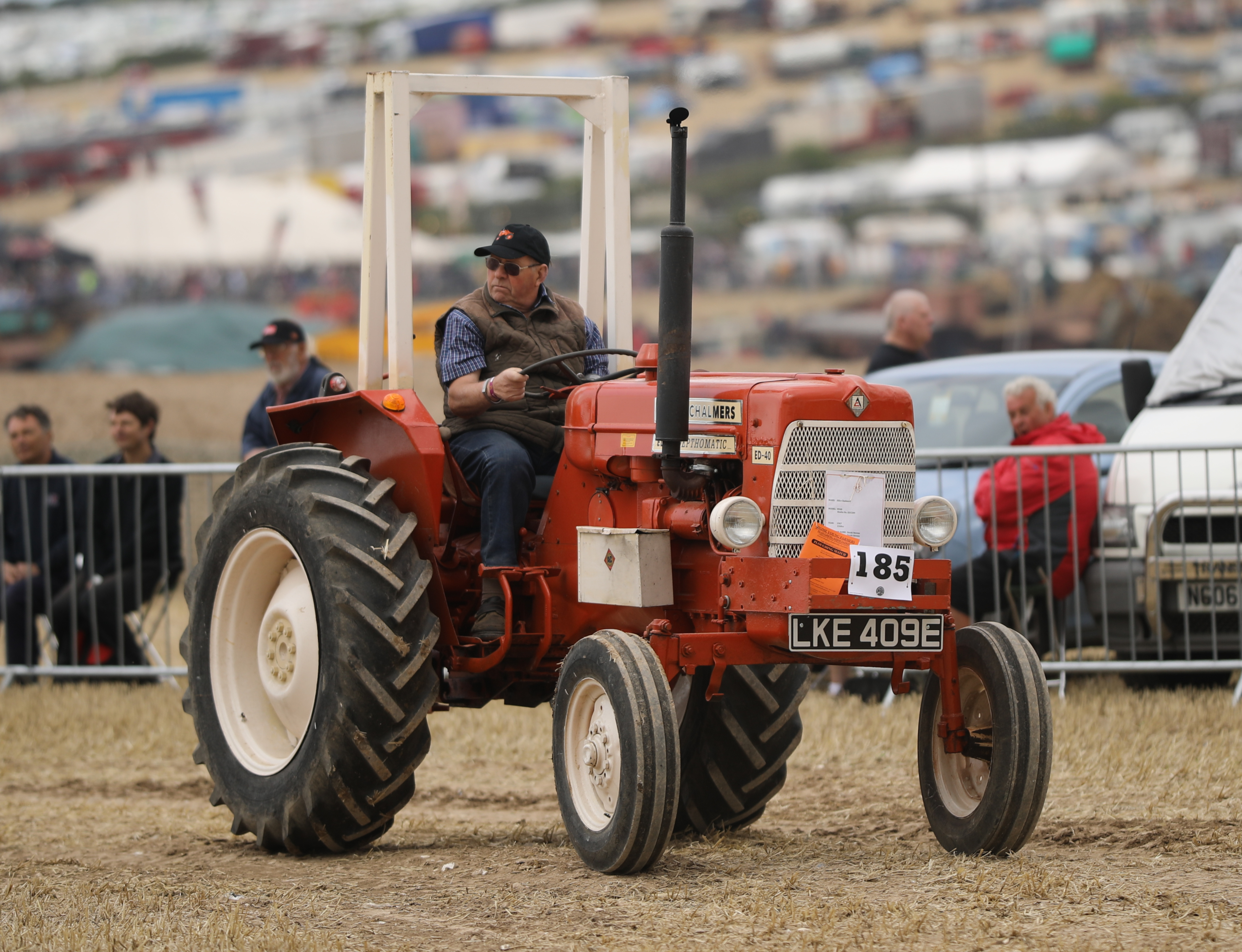
A 1967 Allis Chalmers ED40

The Allis-Chalmers ED 40 tractor was the last model made by the UK subsidiary of the American Allis-Chalmers Corporation before the plant at Essendine, Rutland, was closed in 1985. Introduced at the Smithfield Show, London in 1960, it retained all the features that rowcrop farmers required but in a manner that made it a universal farm tractor. Only diesel power was available from a four-cylinder ohv of 137.89 cu.ins. indirect injection engine made by the Standard Motor Co, Coventry (the same engine as used in the earlier Coventry built Massey Ferguson 35 tractors). As the name may imply, the tractor had about 40 horsepower.

Transmission was 8 speed through a single clutch with the option of the Allis-Chalmers half shaft clutch to achieve 'live' power take-off. Converging three point linkage was powered by an engine mounted hydraulic pump giving hydraulic power whenever the engine was running regardless of transmission status. A hydraulic weight transfer system was built in to increase traction and a simple mechanical depth stop was provided on the earlier machines. Later machines, introduced mid-1963 and called 'Depthomatic' had a draught and position control system. Other modifications and options included improved gear ratios; a pick-up hitch; an increase in power through higher maximum revs and revised battery arrangement. An option on both models was the patent Allis-Chalmers PAVT rear wheels (Power Adjusted Variable Track), a system adopted by other manufacturers after patents expired. Production ended in 1968 and quite a few are still in use on farms in 2011. A few ED40s were exported to the USA. It's hard to say exactly how many made it to the US, but it seems most of them ended up in the Mid-Atlantic and South Eastern regions.
