= Allis-Chalmers Model G =

Small implement carrier tractor

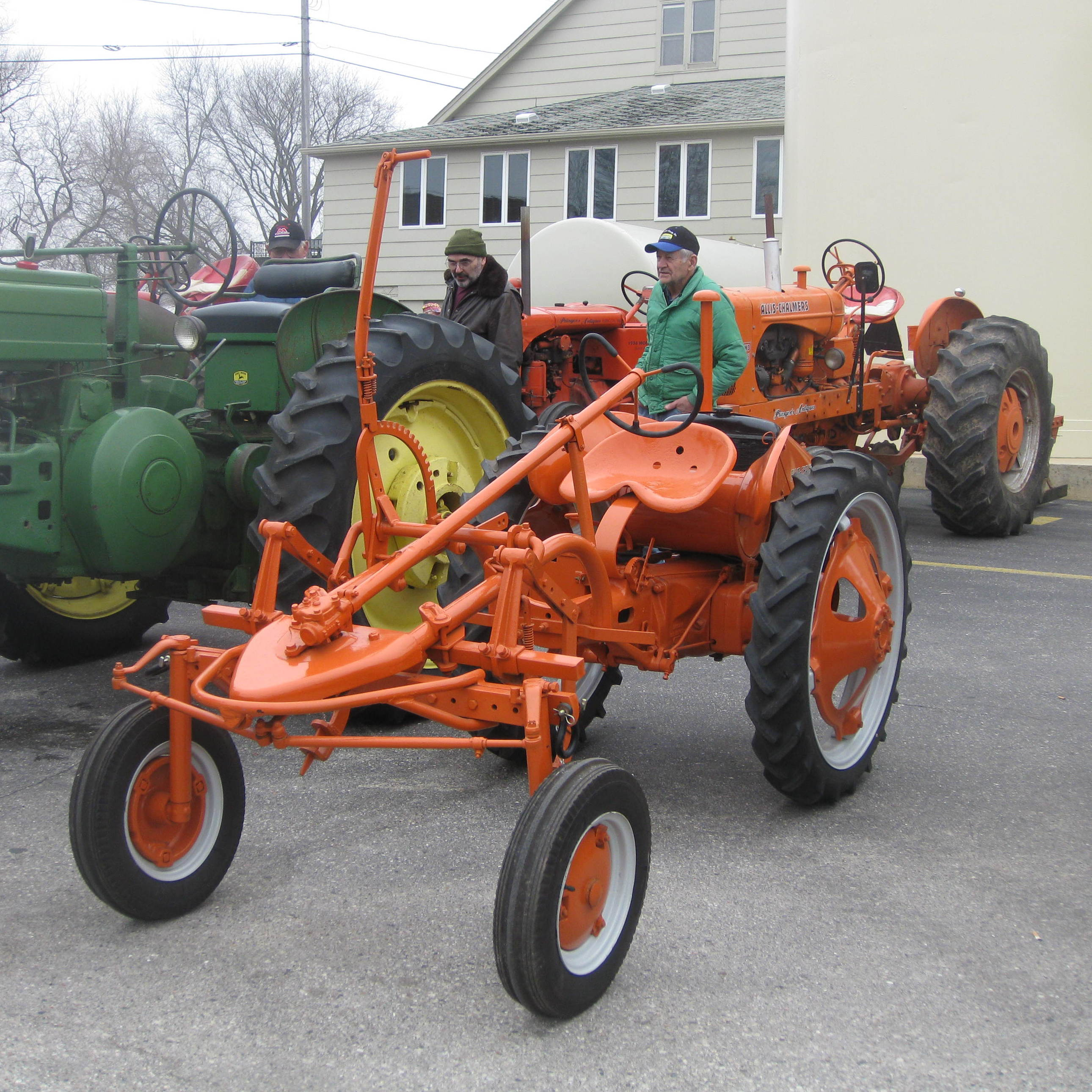
Front view of an Allis Chalmers G

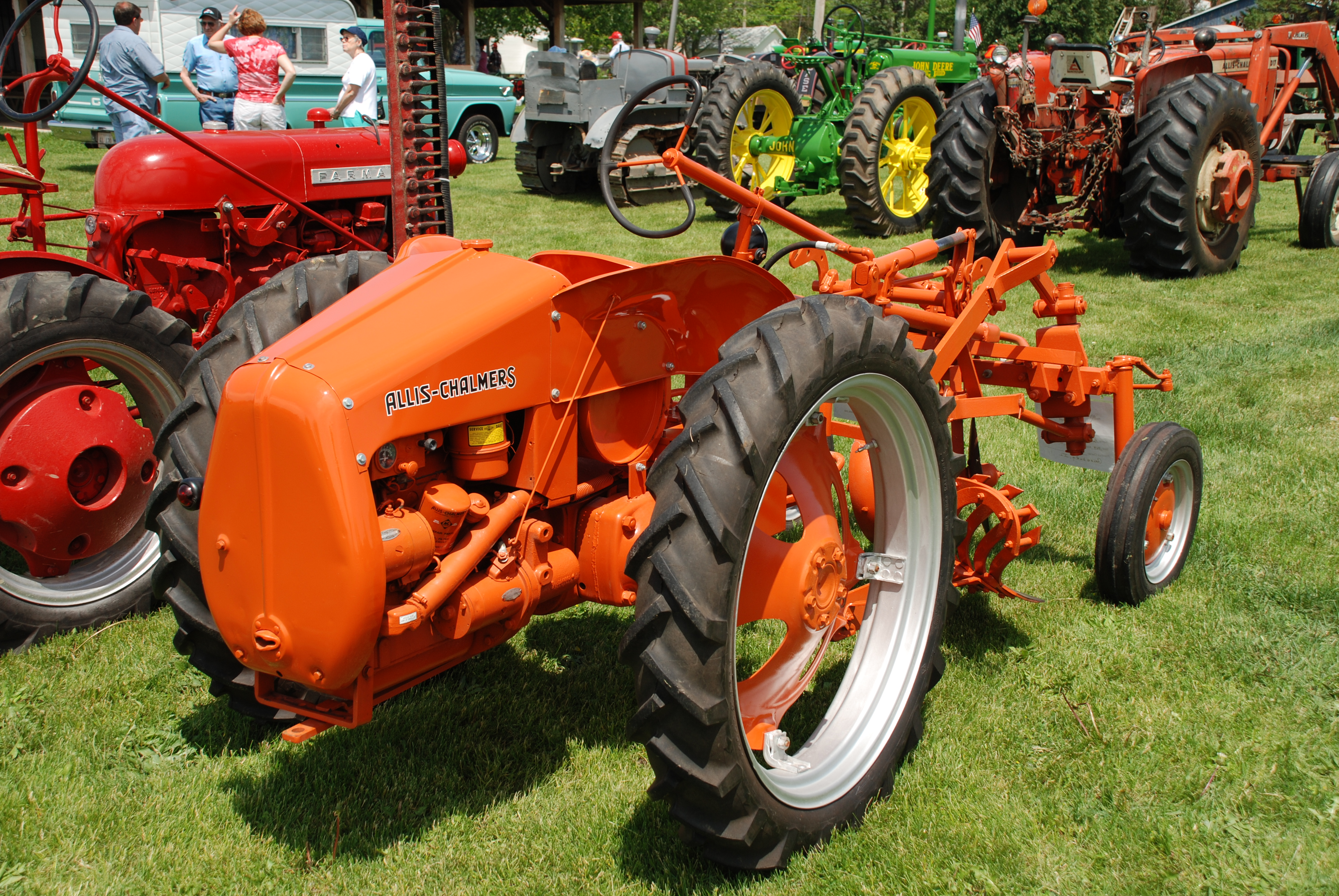
Rear view of an Allis Chalmers G

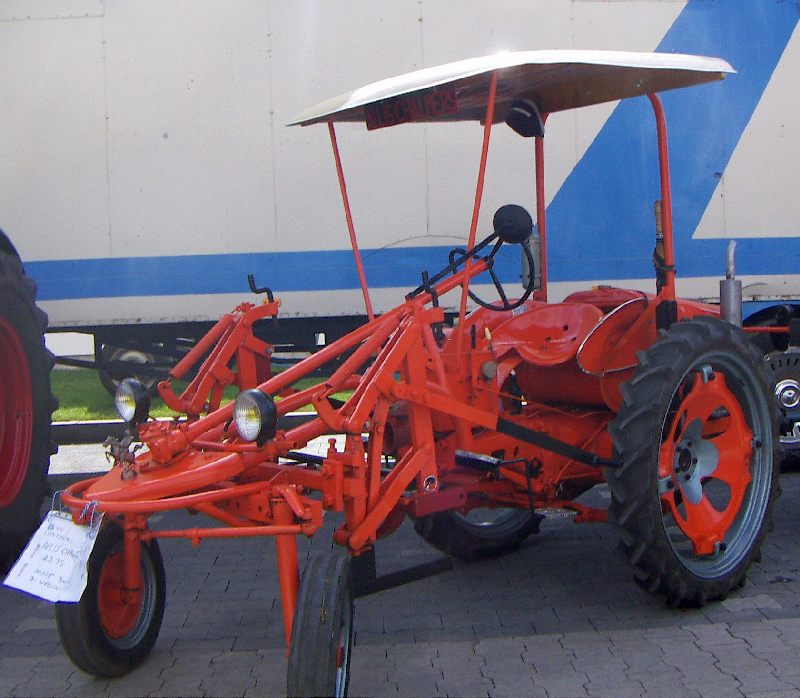
Allis-Chalmers Model GRV, an orchard/vineyard variant of the Model G built in France, 1958.

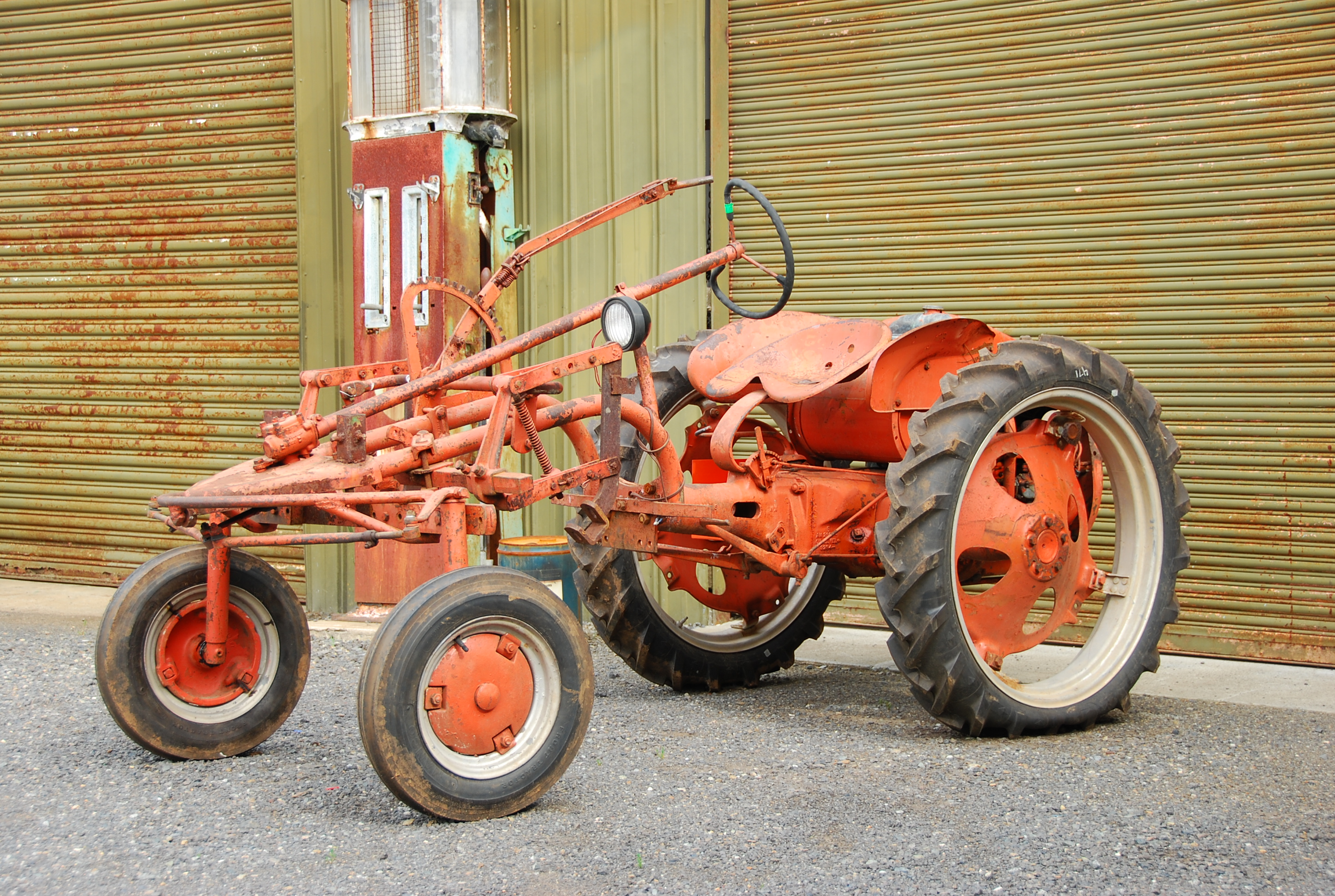
Another G.

The Model G is a small implement carrier tractor that was made by the Allis-Chalmers Manufacturing Company. At the time of its introduction the Model G was unique for its rear-mounted, Continental N62 engine. It was a four-cylinder engine with a 2 3/8 by 3 1/2 inches (60 mm × 89 mm) bore and stroke. The Model G was designed for small farms and vegetable gardeners, and a line of implements specifically designed for it, including ploughs, planters, and cultivators. The design of the Model G allowed for a great view of the belly-mounted implements.

== Details ==
The Model G was manufactured solely in the factory in Gadsden, Alabama, from 1948 to 1955. 29,976 units were built, which is less than Allis-Chalmers had originally hoped for. The Model G had a 5 gallon fuel tank, weighed 1,285 pounds, and was rated at 10 drawbar horsepower (Tested at 10.33 belt and 9.04 drawbar). The engine had a displacement of 62 cubic inches and was rated at 1800 RPM. The transmission was a non-synchronized three-speed with reverse. An additional 'creeper' forward gear was standard equipment as well.

== Electric conversions ==
The unique design of the Model G lends itself extremely well to electric vehicle conversion; a small DC electric motor replaces the original engine and bolts directly to the transmission housing through a commercially available adapter plate. A contactor and electronic motor controller are typically mounted to the same plate. Batteries are mounted in a box above the motor, where they are easily accessible for routine maintenance. The overall weight distribution mimics the tail-heavy design of the original tractor power train, which requires a visible nose counterweight. Over 100 Allis Chalmers model G tractors are known to have been converted as of 2009. In 2018, students from the University of Nebraska-Lincoln partnered with Tuff-bilt Tractors (based on the model G) to build an electric Tuff-bilt prototype. The original prototype "flying beet" conversion, which was partially funded by a USDA SARE grant, is still in use at the Huguenot Farms in New Paltz, NY, USA.

== Other Tractors Based on the "G" ==
In the mid-1950s, David Brown Ltd. introduced a tractor in the UK that was based on the Allis-Chalmers G. The VAD12/V, or 2D as it was better known, used the tubular frame to act as an air receiver for the compressed air implement lifting system. The 2D never sold in large numbers and was discontinued in favor of other models.

Tuff-bilt Tractors has been producing a modern version of the Allis-Chalmers G since 2007. In 2014, Cleber, LLC in Alabama began producing a tractor based on the Allis-Chalmers G known as the Oggún. An Ohio company known as Tilmor is also working on a tractor based on the "G."
