= Gleaner E =

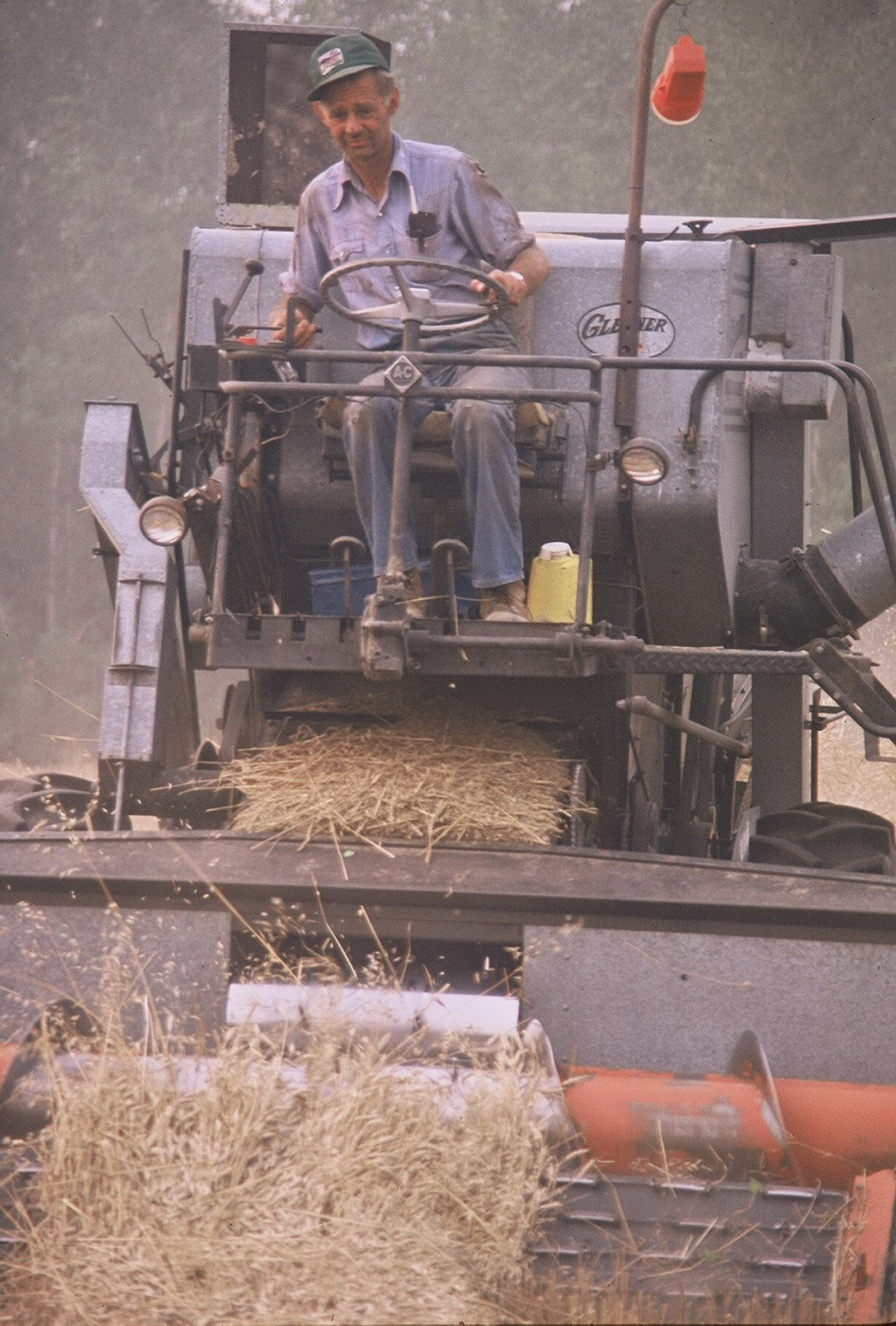
1965 Allis-Chalmers Gleaner E Combine Harvester

The Gleaner E was a self-propelled combine harvester manufactured by the Gleaner Manufacturing Company while part of the Allis-Chalmers Manufacturing Company in the 1960s. 17,300 machines were manufactured in total from 1962 to 1969.

These harvesters utilized a 65 hp (49 kW) 226 cubic inch (3.7 Litre) 4-cylinder gasoline powered internal combustion engine.

In 1969, the Gleaner E was replaced by the Gleaner K, which was nearly identical to the E III model but powered by a larger 250 cu in (4.1 Litre) General Motors 6-cylinder gasoline engine. An Allis Chalmers four cylinder diesel engine was offered as optional equipment on later K2 models after 1976. Gleaner K models were produced by Allis Chalmers until 1982 and remain popular with small scale farmers in the United States due to their simplicity, ease of maintenance, and their small size compared to modern harvesters. They are also widely used by agricultural researchers to harvest small test plots because, unlike larger harvesters, they can easily be transported between plots on a flatbed trailer towed by a heavy duty pickup truck.

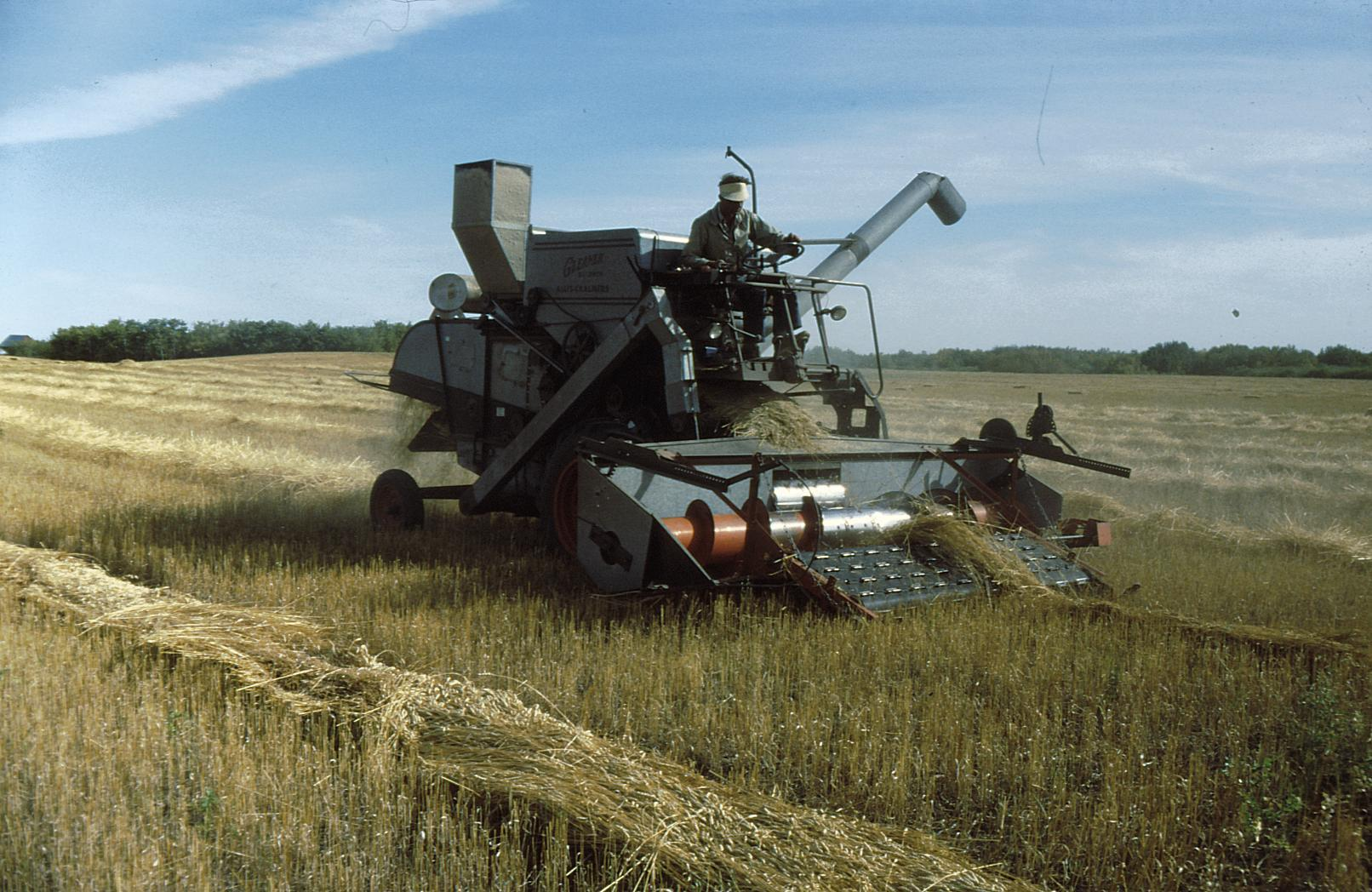

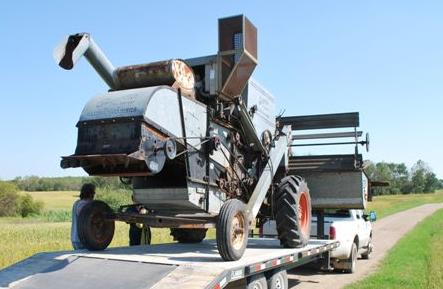
