= List of Allis-Chalmers engines =

This is a list of internal combustion engines produced by the former Allis-Chalmers Corporation Engine Division for use in their lines of tractors, combine harvesters, other agricultural equipment, engine-generators, and other industrial plant.

Allis-Chalmers purchased the Buda Engine Co. in 1953 and took over their well-established line of products. Since Buda was merged entirely into A-C as part of their new Engine Division, its operations became known simply as the "Harvey plant" and all of its production after 1953 was under the Allis-Chalmers name.

The very earliest A-C tractors, up to the mid-1930s, used engines built by outside suppliers (LeRoi, Midwest, Waukesha and Continental were common). Those engines are not included in this list. In a later reversal of this practice, the Engine Division eventually served as a third-party supplier to other makers of farm and industrial machinery, most notably Cockshutt and LeRoi.

Allis-Chalmers (and Buda) produced heavy-duty engine designs that were built to handle a variety of fuel types (generally gasoline, diesel fuel, or liquefied propane gas). The types of fuel each engine could burn are listed where appropriate; further information on fuel types for each engine can be found in the individual engine articles.

In addition, the company spent considerable resources on developing fuel cell technology which was way ahead of its time and was never released to production.

== Inline four-cylinder ==
- 153 Series (153in^{3}; gasoline or diesel)
- 175 Series (175in^{3}; diesel)
- 182 Series (182in^{3}; gasoline or diesel)
- 344 Series (344in^{3}; diesel)
- 433 Series (200in^{3}; gasoline or diesel)
- B Series (116 or 125in^{3}; gasoline)
- E Series (460, 510, or 563in^{3}; gasoline or diesel)
- G Series (138, 149, or 160in^{3}; gasoline or propane)
- W Series (201 or 226in^{3}; gasoline or propane)

== Inline six-cylinder ==
- 230 Series (230in^{3}; gasoline or diesel)
- 262 Series (262in^{3}; gasoline, propane or diesel)
- 273 Series (273in^{3}; gasoline or diesel)
- 649 Series (301in^{3}; gasoline, propane or diesel)
- 670 Series (426in^{3}; diesel)
- 685 Series (516in^{3}; diesel)
- 6120 Series (731in^{3}; diesel)
- 6138 Series (844in^{3}; gasoline or diesel)
- 25000 Series (diesel)

== V8 cylinder ==
- V8 Series (1358in^{3}; diesel)

== V12 cylinder ==
- V12 Series (2035in^{3}; diesel)

== See also ==
- Allis-Chalmers
- Gleaner -- A-C's line of combine harvesters, purchased in 1955
- List of Allis-Chalmers tractors
- Buda Engine Co.
