= John Deere =

American agricultural and industrial auto manufacturing corporation

Deere & Company

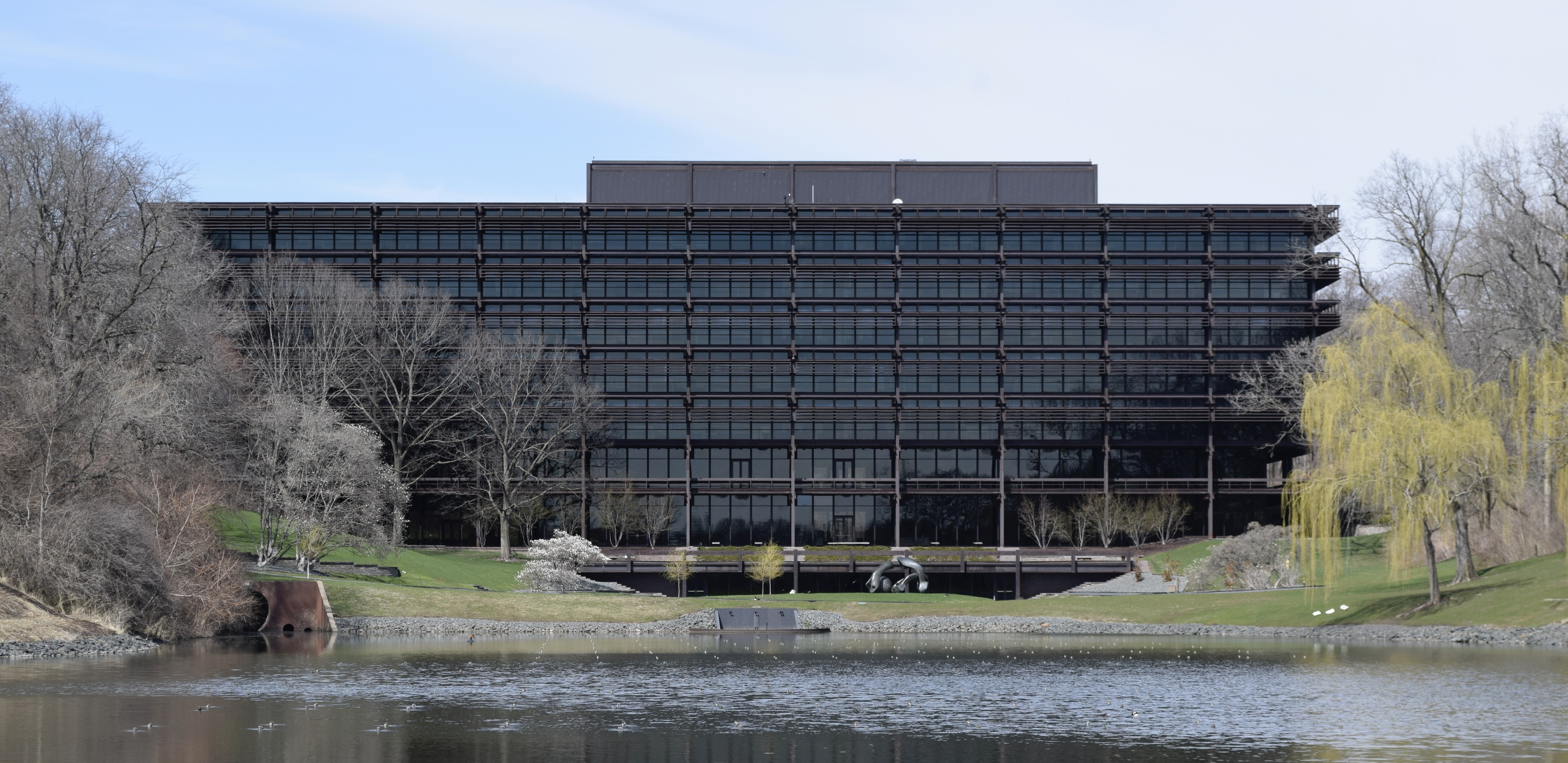
- John Deere World Headquarters in Moline, Illinois
- Type: Public
- Traded as: NYSE: DE; S&P 100 component; S&P 500 component
- Industry: Agricultural machinery; Heavy equipment
- Founded: 1837; 189 years ago, in Grand Detour, Illinois, U.S.
- Founder: John Deere
- Headquarters: One John Deere Place, Moline, Illinois, U.S.
- Area served: Worldwide
- Key people: John C. May (chairman, CEO & president)
- Products: Tractors; Combine harvesters; Forage harvesters; Sugarcane harvesters; Seed drills; Field sprayers; FEL attachments; Telescopic handlers; Backhoes; Excavators; Loaders; Graders; Feller bunchers; Forwarders; Log Loaders; Skidders; Diesel engines
- Services: Financial services
- Revenue: ▼US$45.7 billion (2025)
- Operating income: ▼US$6.26 billion (2025)
- Net income: ▼US$5.03 billion (2025)
- Total assets: ▼US$106 billion (2025)
- Total equity: ▲US$25.9 billion (2025)
- Number of employees: 73,100 (2025)
- Subsidiaries: Nortrax, Vapormatic, Hagie, Monosem, Blue River Technology, Harvest Profit, Navcom Technology, OnGolf, Lesco, Unimil, John Deere Financial, Bear Flag Robotics
- Website: deere.com
- Footnotes; Financials as of November 2, 2025.

Deere & Company (doing business as John Deere) (/ˈdʒɒnˈdɪər/), is an American corporation that manufactures agricultural machinery, heavy equipment, forestry machinery, diesel engines, drivetrains (axles, transmissions, gearboxes) used in heavy equipment and lawn care equipment. It also provides financial services and other related activities.

Deere & Company is listed on the New York Stock Exchange under the symbol DE. The company's slogan is "Nothing Runs Like a Deere", and its logo is a leaping deer with the words "John Deere". It has used logos incorporating a leaping deer for over 155 years. It is headquartered in Moline, Illinois.

It ranked No. 84 in the 2022 Fortune 500 list of the largest United States corporations. Its tractor series include D series, E series, Specialty Tractors, Super Heavy Duty Tractors, and JDLink.

== History ==
=== 19th century ===
In 1836 Deere & Company began when John Deere, born in Rutland, Vermont, United States, on February 7, 1804, moved to Grand Detour, Illinois to escape bankruptcy in Vermont. Already an established blacksmith, Deere opened a 1,378-square-foot (128 m^{2}) shop in Grand Detour in 1837, which allowed him to serve as a general repairman in the village, and a manufacturer of tools such as pitchforks and shovels. An item that set him apart was the self-scouring steel plow, which was pioneered in 1837 when John Deere fashioned a Scottish steel saw blade into a plow.

Prior to Deere's steel plow, most farmers used iron or wooden plows to which the rich Midwestern soil stuck, so they had to be cleaned frequently. Deere created a highly polished steel surface that allowed the soil to slide easily. This tool addressed the difficulty of tilling the Prairie State's soil and greatly aided migration into the American Great Plains in the 19th and early 20th centuries.

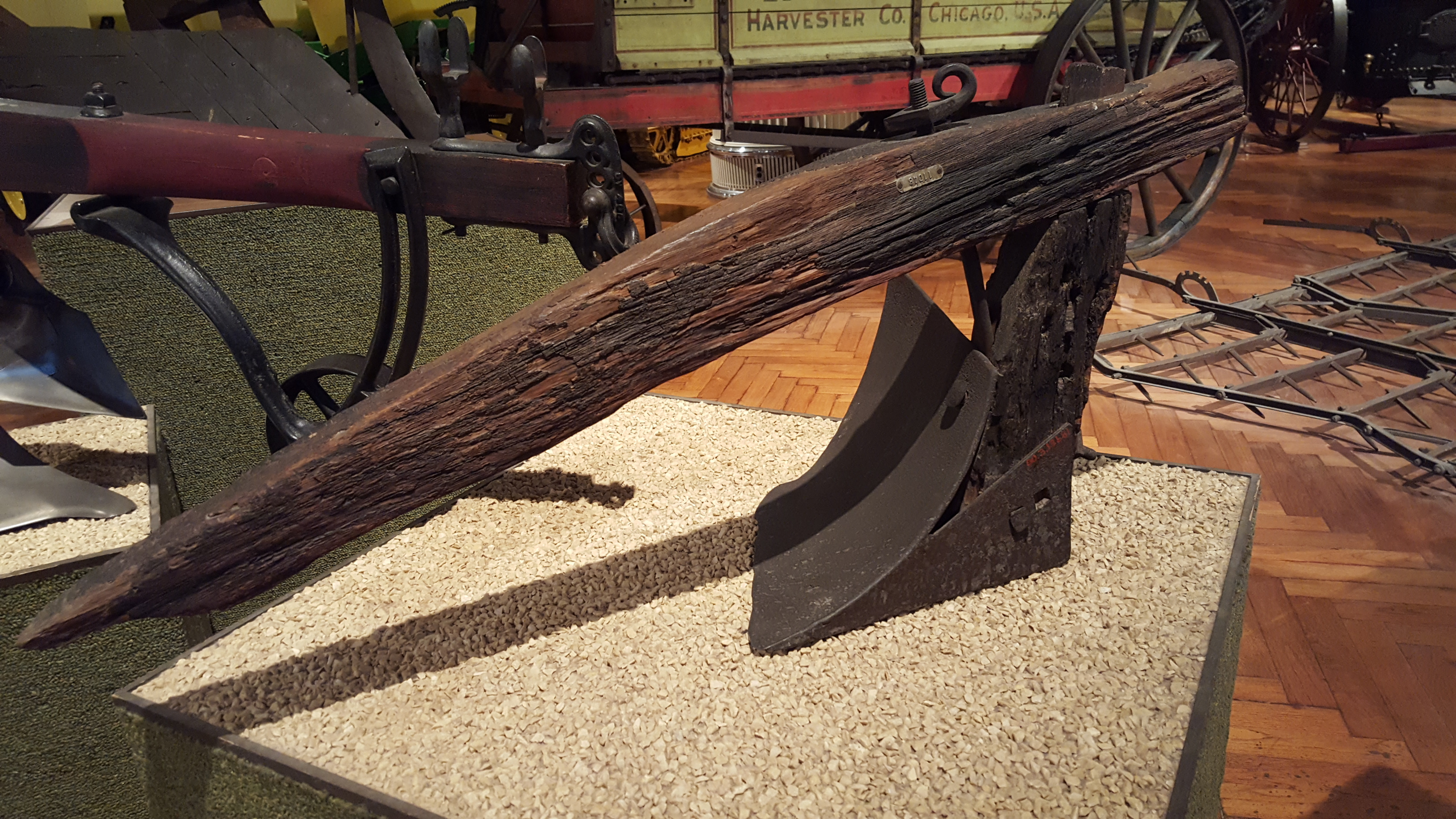
John Deere plow c. 1845

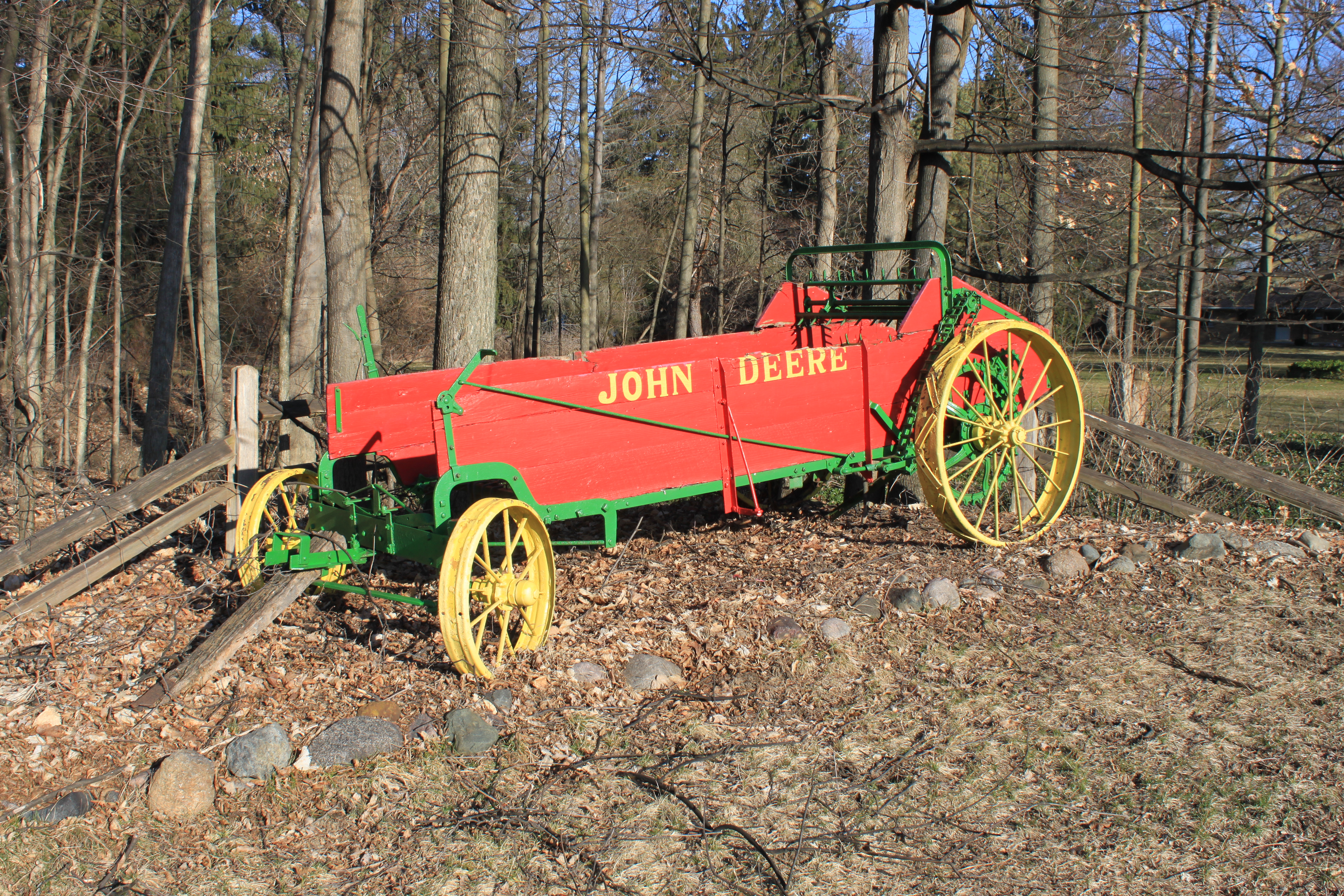
Horse-drawn manure spreader

In early 1843, Deere entered a business partnership with Leonard Andrus and purchased land for the construction of a new, two-story factory along the Rock River in Illinois. It used water power to operate machineries. This factory, named the "L. Andrus Plough Manufacturer", produced about 100 plows in 1842, and around 400 plows during the next year. Deere's partnership with Andrus ended in 1848, and Deere relocated to Moline, Illinois, to have access to the railroad and the Mississippi River. There, Deere formed a partnership with Robert Tate and built a 1,440-square-foot (134 m^{2}) factory the same year. John Gould was later brought in to manage the accounts. Production rose quickly, and by 1849, the Deere, Tate & Gould Company was producing over 200 plows a month. A two-story addition to the plant was built, allowing further production.

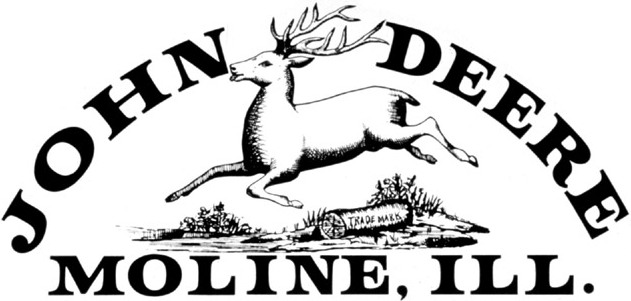
Company logo used between 1876 and 1912

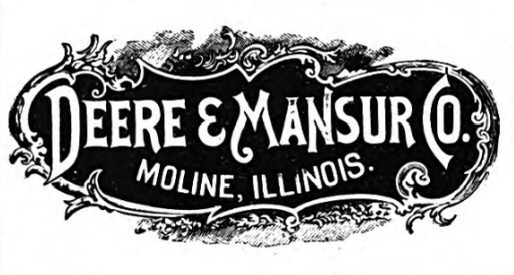
Deere & Mansur Co. logo (1901)

Deere bought out Tate and Gould's interests in the company in 1853, and was joined in the business by his son Charles Deere. At that time, the company was manufacturing a variety of farm equipment products in addition to plows, including wagons, corn planters, and cultivators. In 1857, the company's production totals reached almost 1,120 implements per month. In 1858, a nationwide financial recession took a toll on the company. During this period, the company announced its work on a steam engine that will pull its plow but the product did not materialize. To prevent bankruptcy, the company was reorganized and Deere turned over his interests in the business to his son-in-law, Christopher Webber, and his son, Charles Deere, who would take on most of his father's managerial roles. John Deere served as president of the company until his retirement in April 1886, but died one month later in May 1886 in Moline, Illinois. The company was reorganized again in 1868 when it was incorporated as Deere & Company. While the company's original stockholders were Charles Deere, Stephen Velie, George Vinton, and John Deere, Charles effectively ran the company. In 1869, Charles began to introduce marketing centers and independent retail dealers to advance the company's sales nationwide. This same year, Deere & Company won "Best and Greatest Display of Plows in Variety" at the 17th Annual Illinois State Fair, for which it won $10 and a silver medal.

The core focus remained on the agricultural implements, but John Deere also made a few bicycles in the 1890s.

=== 20th century ===
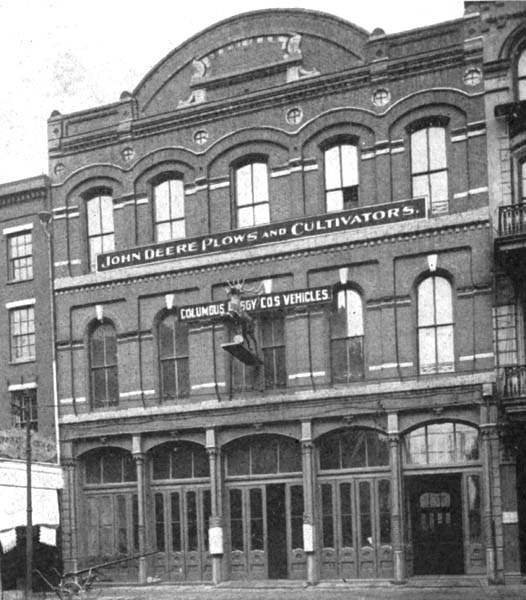
John Deere Plow & Cultivators Co.'s New Orleans House, 1903

Increased competition during the early 1900s from the new International Harvester Company led the company to expand its offerings in the implement business, but the production of gasoline tractors came to define Deere & Company's operations during the 20th century.

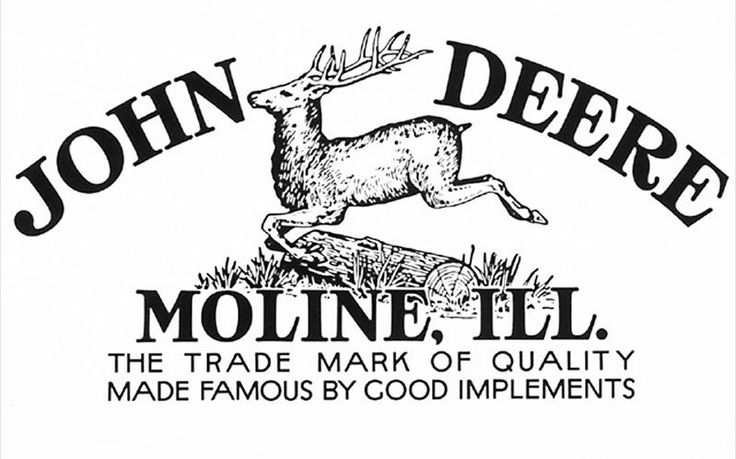
Company logo used between 1912 and 1936

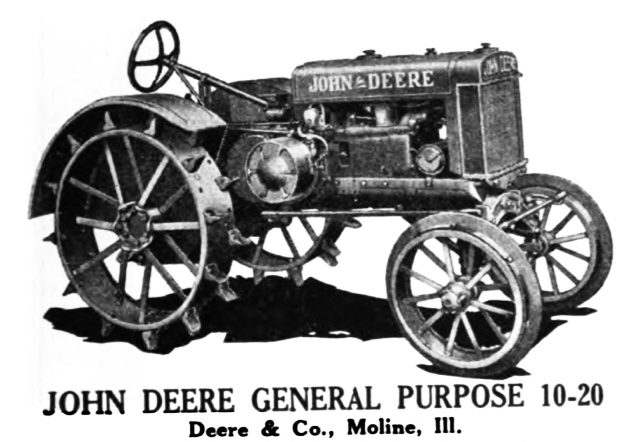
John Deere General Purpose 10-20 (1928-1935)

In 1912, Deere & Company president William Butterworth (Charles' son-in-law), who had replaced Charles Deere after his death in 1907, began the company's expansion into the tractor business. Deere & Company briefly experimented with its own tractor models, the most successful of which was the Dain All-Wheel-Drive, but in the end decided to continue its foray into the tractor business by purchasing the Waterloo Gasoline Engine Company in 1918, which manufactured the popular Waterloo Boy tractor at its facilities in Waterloo, Iowa. Deere & Company continued to sell tractors under the Waterloo Boy name until 1923, when the John Deere Model D was introduced. The company continues to manufacture a large percentage of its tractors in Waterloo, Iowa, namely the 7R, 8R, and 9R series.

The company produced its first combine harvester, the John Deere No. 2, in 1927. This featured improvements and modifications to Model D such as higher power level due to increased cylinder bore. A year later, this innovation was followed up by the introduction of John Deere No. 1, a smaller machine that was more popular with customers. By 1929, the No. 1 and No. 2 were replaced by newer, lighter-weight harvesters. In the 1930s, John Deere and other farm equipment manufacturers began developing hillside harvesting technology. Harvesters now had the ability to effectively use their combines to harvest grain on hillsides with up to a 50% slope gradient.

On an episode of the Travel Channel series Made in America that profiled Deere & Company, host John Ratzenberger stated that the company never repossessed any equipment from American farmers during the Great Depression.

During World War II, the great-grandson of John Deere, Charles Deere Wiman, was president of the company, but he accepted a commission as a colonel in the U.S. Army. Burton F. Peek was hired as president during this period. Before Wiman returned to work at the company in late 1944, he directed the farm machinery and equipment division of the War Production Board. In addition to farm machinery, John Deere manufactured military tractors, and transmissions for the M3 tank. They also made aircraft parts, ammunition, and mobile laundry units to support the war effort.

In 1947, John Deere introduced its first self-propelled combine, model 55. It was soon followed by the smaller models 40 and 45, the larger model 95, and an even larger model 105 was introduced in the 1960s. In the mid-1950s, Deere introduced an attachable corn head, allowing corn producers to use their combine to pick, shell, and clean corn in one smooth operation.

In 1956, Deere & Company bought-out the German tractor manufacturer, Heinrich Lanz AG (see Lanz Bulldog).

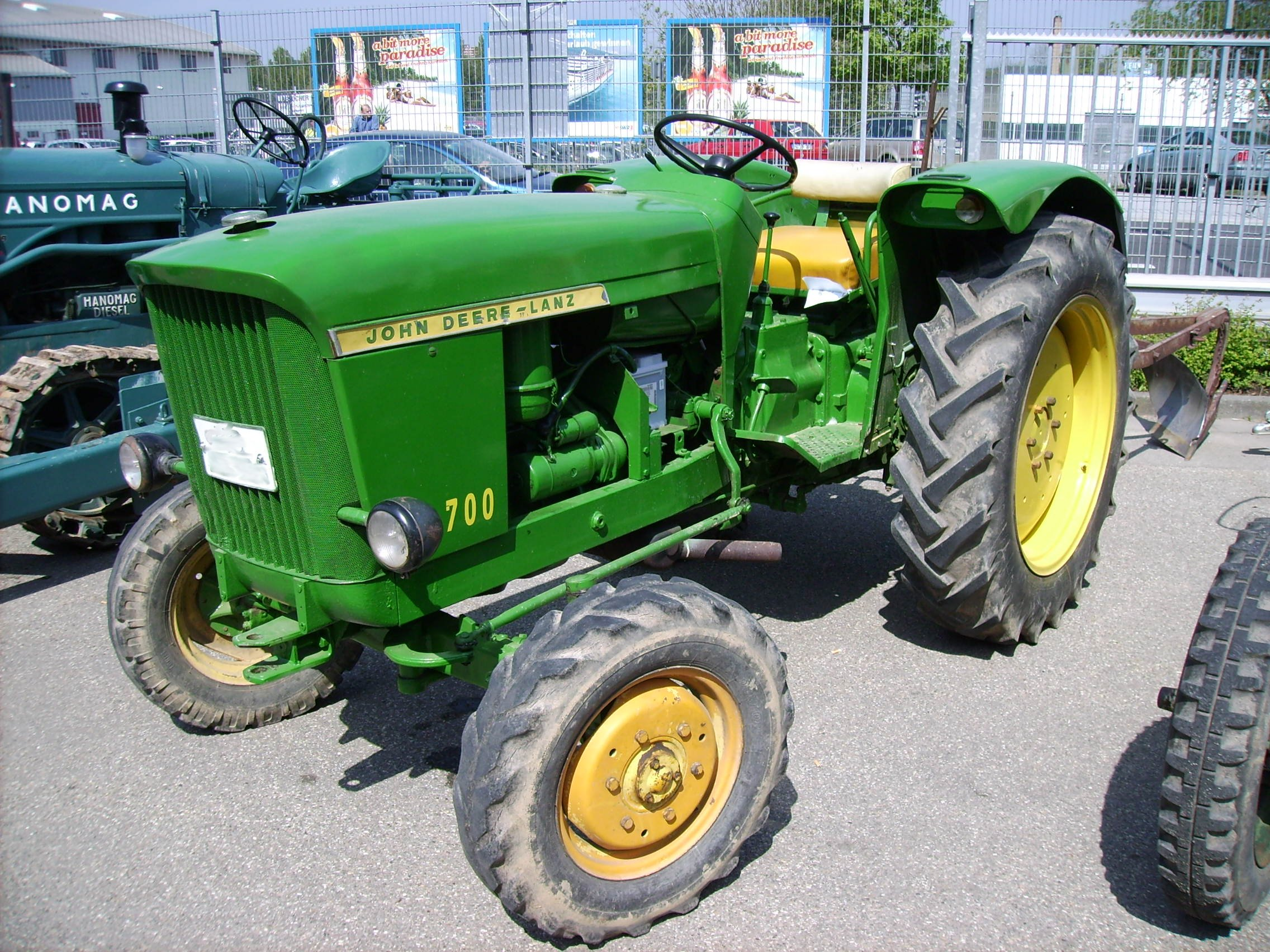
A John Deere-Lanz 700 tractor

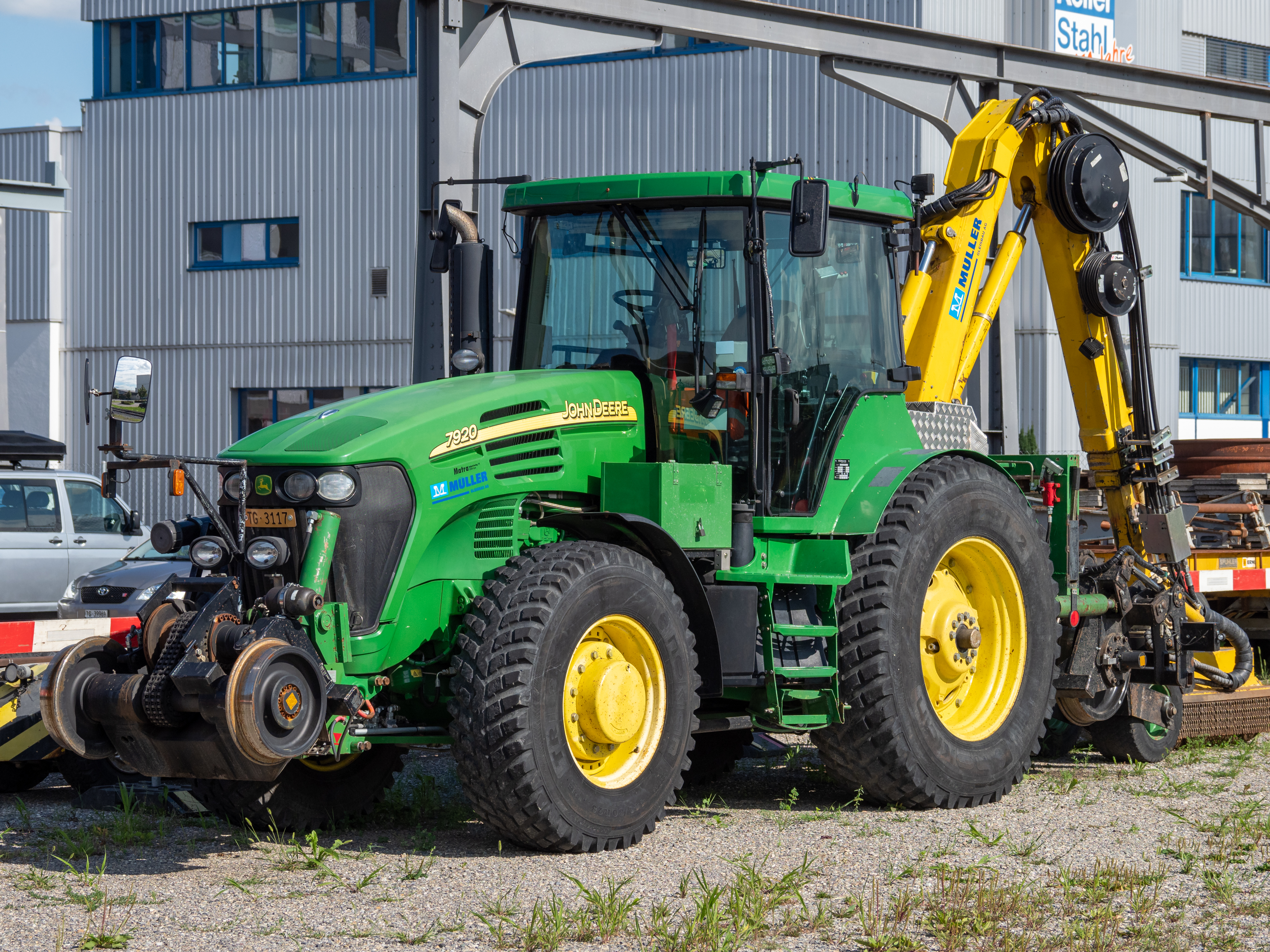
John Deere 7920 used by a track construction company

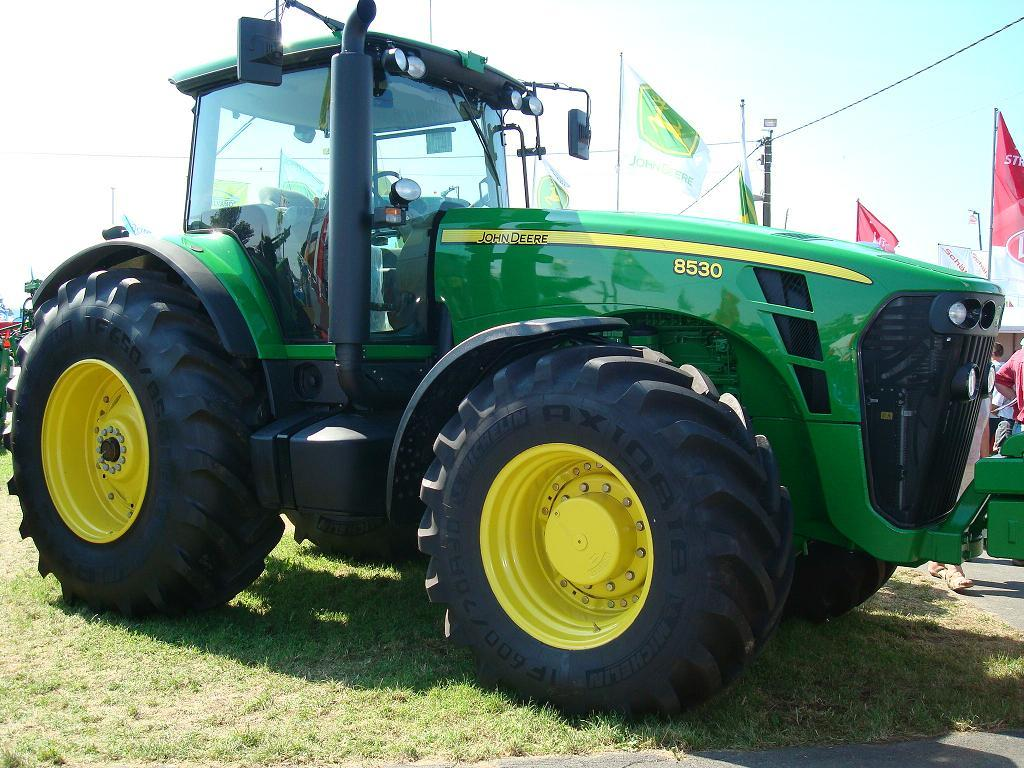
The John Deere 8530

In the last months of 1958, John Deere constructed a factory in northern Rosario, Argentina. In Argentina, the make was managed by Agar Cross & Co. John Deere made the following models of tractors in Argentina: 445, 730; the models of the series 20 like 1420, 2420, 3420, 4420; the models of the serie 30 like 2330, 2530, 2730, 3330, 3530, 4530; the models of the serie 40 like 2140, 3140 / 3140 DT, 3440, 3540 and the last made in Baigorria of the serie 50 like 2850, 3350, 3550 until 1994. Seventeen years later, (in 2011) the Argentinian plant returns the assembly of tractors with the following models: 5036C, 5045D (45 HP) Serie 5D, 5045E (45 HP) Serie 5E, 5065E (65 HP) Serie 5E, 5075E (75 HP) Serie 5E, 5425N (77 HP) Serie 5000, 5725 (92 HP) Serie 5025, 5725HC (92 HP) Serie 5025, 5090E, 5090EH, 5076EF, 6110J, 6130J, 6145J and 6165J.

Plus, in 2012, added in SKD/CKD format, the assembly of combine harvesters 9570 STS Serie 70, 9470 STS, 9670 STS and 9770 STS.

Also, with the green line, the Argentinian facility made some backhoe loaders and motor graders like 570 A/B, 544 A/B, 507, 308, 200 and the 627, 727 model tractors.

In 1960, John Deere first began selling the "10" series of tractors. John Deere announced them in an extravagant fashion, hosting a large event at the Dallas Memorial Auditorium and the Texas State Fairgrounds. Attendance was reported at 6000 guests. The 10 series used new four and six cylinder engines and were designed to be more ergonomic, and easier to service.

The 4010 was rated at 80 horsepower in 1960, but tested at 84 horsepower during testing trials, making it one of the most powerful two-wheel-drive farm tractors at that time. The 4010 was the predecessor to the 4020, which is widely regarded as the most popular tractor ever produced by John Deere, and perhaps any tractor manufacturer in the United States. Although the 4020, which was available with Deere's optional Power Shift, enjoyed greater popularity, the 4010 moved John Deere into the modern era of farm tractor technology and design following its successful history as a tractor manufacturer that was by the late 1950s experiencing waning market share due to its outdated technology.

In addition to the advanced engine technology, the "10" series tractors offered many other upgrades from the older two-cylinder models they replaced, including significantly higher horsepower-to-weight ratio, advanced hydraulics, more convenient and comfortable operator stations, and many other improvements. Of the "10" series John Deere tractors introduced in 1960, the 4010 was by far the most popular, with more than 58,000 units sold from 1960 to 1963. The success of the "10" series John Deere tractors, led by the 4010, helped propel John Deere from a 23% market share in 1959 to 34% by 1964 when the 4020 was introduced, making it the top manufacturer of farm equipment in the United States.

In 1972, Deere introduced its new Generation II 'Sound Idea Tractors', the 4030, 4230, 4430, and 4630. While these tractors were mechanically similar to the New Generation tractors they replaced, and the 4230, 4430, and 4630 used a 404-cubic-inch displacement engine like the 4020, they featured redesigned sheet metal and most importantly they were available with an optional completely integrated operator's cab that John Deere called the Sound Gard body. This insulated cab that included a roll-over protective structure had a distinctive rounded windshield and came equipped with heat and air conditioning, as well as speakers for an optional radio. An 8-track tape player was also available as an option. The 5020 was replaced by the very similar 6030 and continued in production with New Generation styling until 1977 when the 30 Series tractors were replaced by Deere's 'Iron Horses' series that included the 90-hp 4040, 110-hp 4240, 130-hp 4440, 150-HP 4640, and 180-hp 4840. The 4240, 4440, 4640, and 4840 featured a new 466-cubic-inch displacement engine, and improvements to the cab including an optional hydraulic seat for a smoother ride. The Sound Gard body and 8-speed Power Shift transmission were standard equipment on the 4840.

In 1983, Deere introduced the 4050, 4250, 4450, 4650, and 4850. These tractors were essentially the same machines as the Iron Horses they replaced, but with significant upgrades. They offered a new 15-speed PowerShift transmission and were available with an optional mechanical front-wheel drive featuring caster action for better traction and a tighter turning radius. They also featured cosmetic upgrades, including a new light brown cab interior, instead of the black interior on previous models. These tractors were followed in the late 80s by the mechanically similar 55 and 60 series tractors before they were replaced by Deere's completely redesigned 7000 and 8000 series tractors in the early 1990s.

In the 1962 Illinois Manufacturers Directory (50th-anniversary edition), John Deere, listed as Deere and Company, claimed a total workforce of 35,000, of which 9,000 were in Illinois. The corporate headquarters were located at 1325 Third Ave. in Moline, Illinois, with six manufacturing plants located around that city and a seventh plant in Hoopeston, Illinois. The six plants in Moline were listed as:

- John Deere Harvester Works at 1100 13th Ave., East Moline, where 3,000 employees made agricultural implements
- John Deere Industrial Equipment Works at 301 Third Ave., Moline, where 500 employees made earth-moving equipment
- John Deere Malleable Works at 1335-13th Street, East Moline, where 600 employees made malleable and nodular iron castings
- John Deere Planter Works at 501 Third Ave., Moline, where 1,000 employees made agricultural implements
- John Deere Plow Works at 1225 Third Ave., Moline, where 1,100 employees made agricultural implements
- John Deere Spreader Works at 1209-13th Ave., Moline where 800 employees made agricultural implements

The John Deere Vermilion Works was located at North Sixth Ave., Hoopeston, Illinois, where 140 employees were listed as making iron work and implement parts. Moline, with 42,705 residents in 1962, had the local 7,000 employees of John Deere represent 16% of the city's entire population.

In 1969, John Deere followed its New Generation tractors of the 1960s with a New Generation of combines. These included the 3300, 4400, 6600, and 7700. These models were also the first to come with Quik-Tatch header mounting capabilities as standard equipment. In the 1980s, these combines were followed by the 4420, 6620, 7720, and 8820 that were essentially updated and improved versions of the previous models with larger capacity, a better cab, and easier maintenance and service. The 4420 was discontinued in 1984 and replaced by the 4425 combines imported from Germany, and the 6620, 7720, and 8820 received the Titan II updates.

In 1989, Deere replaced the 6620, 7720, and 8820 with a new line of completely redesigned 'Maximizer' combines that included the 9400, 9500, and 9600 walker combines. These combines featured a center-mounted cab, rear-mounted engine, and more comforts in the cab. Also in 1989, Deere was inducted into the National Inventors Hall of Fame. In 1997, Deere celebrated 50 years of self-propelled combine production, and the 1997 models featured a 50th-anniversary decal. In 1998, the 9410, 9510, and 9610 were introduced. These were essentially the same machines, but with minor upgrades. Deere dealers offered '10 series' upgrades to owners of older 9000 series Maximizer combines. In 1999, Deere introduced the 50 series Maximizer combines. These machines featured significant cosmetic upgrades including a more streamlined appearance, improved ergonomics in the cab, PTO shaft-style header hook-up, and the larger models were available as rotary machines which were a complete departure from the combines that Deere had built in the past.

In the late 1970s, International Harvester had pioneered rotary combines with their Axial flow machines and were soon followed by other manufacturers, but Deere continued to build only conventional walker combines through the 1980s and 1990s. In 1999, John Deere introduced the Single-Tine Separation (STS) system on its 9550, 9650, and 9750 combines, representing a step forward in rotary combine technology. The STS system uses less horsepower and improves material handling.

=== 21st century ===
In 2014, the Smithsonian Museum named John Deere's original plough design as one of the objects that changed American history.

As of 2018, Deere & Company employed about 67,000 people worldwide, of which half are in the United States and Canada, and is the largest agriculture machinery company in the world. In August 2014, the company announced it was indefinitely laying off 600 of its workers at plants in Illinois, Iowa, and Kansas due to less demand for its products. Inside the United States, the company's primary locations are its World Headquarters in Moline, Illinois, and manufacturing factories in central and southeastern United States. As of 2016, the company experiments with an electric farm tractor.

The logo of the leaping deer has been used by this company for over 155 years. Over the years, the logo has had minor changes and pieces removed. The "John Deere Moline, Ill." trademark (USPTO Serial No. 71055630), covering plows and a range of farm implements, was filed on April 8, 1911, and registered on September 10, 1912. Some of the older style logos have the deer leaping over a log. The company uses different logo colors for agricultural vs. construction products. The company's agricultural products are identifiable by a distinctive shade of green paint, with the inside border being yellow. By contrast, the construction products are identifiable by a shade of black with the deer being yellow, and the inside border also being yellow.

In September 2017, Deere & Company signed a definitive agreement to acquire Blue River Technology, which is based in Sunnyvale, California, and is applying machine learning to agriculture. Blue River has designed and integrated computer vision and machine learning technology that will enable growers to reduce the use of herbicides by spraying only where weeds are present.

In 2018, Deere and 90 Fortune 500 companies "paid an effective federal tax rate of 0% or less" as a result of Donald Trump's Tax Cuts and Jobs Act of 2017.

In August 2019, it was announced that Samuel R. Allen would step down as CEO and president of John Deere. John May, president of the Worldwide Agriculture and Turf and Integrated Solutions divisions replaced him in November 2019.

In October 2021, about 10,000 employees, unionized with the United Auto Workers, went on strike following an impasse in contract negotiations.

In January 2022, the company introduced a self-driving tractor at the annual Consumer Electronics Show, designed for large-scale farming as opposed to existing comparable tractors designed for small-scale agriculture. It was part of a larger effort to develop so-called smart machines to make farming faster and more efficient than it would be relying on human labor, including through software, which would mean higher margins. The company said it wanted to "connect 1.5 million machines in service and a half billion acres in use to its cloud-based John Deere Operations Center."

In June 2022, Deere announced it would cease production of its model 3710 moldboard plow but would continue to offer its model 995 reversible plow.

In July 2024, Deere announced it would lay off 600 employees in its Midwest facilities and is considering moving the production of some components to Mexico. Donald Trump said he would impose 200% tariffs on Mexican-made equipment. The company announced more layoffs in August 2025, citing economic factors and decreased demand.

== Non-serviceability by owners or third parties ==
Late model John Deere farm equipment has been criticized for being impossible to be serviced or repaired by owners or third parties. Only John Deere has access to computer code required for this and to accept non John-Deere replacement parts. Remote locking by the manufacturer may also be possible. This effectively makes the equipment unusable without the continued involvement of John Deere. It was reported that during the 2022 Russian invasion of Ukraine, Russian troops stole Ukrainian farm equipment and took it back to Russia, but that the dealers who owned the equipment locked it remotely.

John Deere's license covering the internal software on tractor control computers does not allow users or independent mechanics to modify the software. This prevents repairs by farmers and creates a monopoly for John Deere dealerships. John Deere claims user repair is forbidden by the Digital Millennium Copyright Act, through bypassing of digital rights management. Groups including the Electronic Frontier Foundation have criticised this activity, being contrary to the right to repair. Some farmers use Ukrainian versions of John Deere software to circumvent restrictions on repair. In February 2022, the US Senate introduced a bill to allow farmers to perform their own repairs. As of April 2022, right-to-repair bills had been introduced in 26 states.

In January 2023, John Deere signed a memorandum of understanding (MOU) with the American Farm Bureau Federation (AFBF) in which the company agreed to allow farmers and independent repair shops to purchase access to John Deere software, manuals, and other information needed to fix John Deere equipment. Walter Schweitzer, President of the Montana Farmers Union, expressed skepticism about the agreement, pointing out that the private-sector MOU lacks a legal enforcement mechanism and allows the company to pull out of the MOU if any right-to-repair legislation is enacted. As part of the MOU, the AFBF agreed to encourage state farm bureaus to "refrain from introducing, promoting, or supporting federal or state 'Right to Repair' legislation that imposes obligations beyond the commitments in this MOU."

The issue addressed by the MOU is still a problem for users of John Deere farm equipment in other countries such as Australia, where agricultural machinery is not covered by Australia's first right to repair law, a federal statute providing for mandatory data sharing in the automotive sector. In Australia, agricultural industry bodies have been and are lobbying for right to repair laws covering agricultural machinery. In November 2024, Australia's federal and state treasurers entered into a 10-year intergovernmental agreement on national competition policy that the federal treasurer, Jim Chalmers, has said was "an important first step towards delivering broader 'right to repair' reforms ... especially in agriculture and farming".

=== Legal issues concerning repair policies ===
In June 2022, 13 lawsuits from farms and farmers, alleging that John Deere and its affiliated dealerships had unlawfully conspired to monopolize and restrain the market for repair and maintenance services of John Deere equipment, were consolidated in federal court in Illinois. In February 2023, the United States Department of Justice filed a "statement of interest" in the case opposing a motion by John Deere to dismiss the case, arguing that restrictions on repair can harm both consumers and the public. In November 2023, U.S. District Judge Iain Johnston denied John Deere's motion to dismiss the case, finding that the plaintiffs' complaint "is chock-full of factual allegations to support" the conclusion that "Deere has the ultimate control of the repair services market" for John Deere equipment. In April 2026, John Deere agreed to settle the class action lawsuit; while admitting no wrongdoing, Deere agreed to pay $99 million into a fund that would allow farms and individuals who paid John Deere dealers for equipment repairs to recoup between 26% and 53% of overcharge damages, with Deere also agreeing to provide "the digital tools required for the maintenance, diagnosis, and repair" of John Deere farm equipment for 10 years.

In January 2025, the Federal Trade Commission (FTC) filed an antitrust lawsuit against Deere over the company's restrictive repair policies. In its lawsuit, the FTC argued that Deere inflated repair costs for farmers by preventing independent shops from repairing Deere equipment. The FTC was joined in its lawsuit by five US states including Michigan and Wisconsin.

In July 2026, the FTC lawsuit concluded with a settlement, and requires Deere to make repair services available to independent repair shops and owners of Deere equipment. Deere was required to pay $1 million in legal fees to the involved states, and is subject to compliance oversight for the next 10 years. Deere is required to make available "on fair and reasonable terms" any resources it currently makes available to its dealers, and any future materials distributed to over 50% of its dealers, including fault code diagnosis and removal, technical manuals and troubleshooting information, and previously software-locked features like pairing new components and restarting a machine after emissions-related shutdowns. The "fair and reasonable terms" are more clearly defined than the $99 million lawsuit filed in 2022, which now defines pricing by what authorized Deere dealers pay for tools and repair components. The U.S. Public Interest Research Group (PIRG) senior right to repair campaign director Nathan Proctor stated that the FTC's settlement was "much better than the deal secured in [the Illinois] class action lawsuit".

== Products ==
John Deere manufactures a wide range of products, often with several models of each.

=== Agricultural equipment ===
Agricultural products include, including tractors, combine harvesters, cotton harvesters, balers, planters/seeders, silage machines, sprayers, spreaders, dry machines, and grain carts.

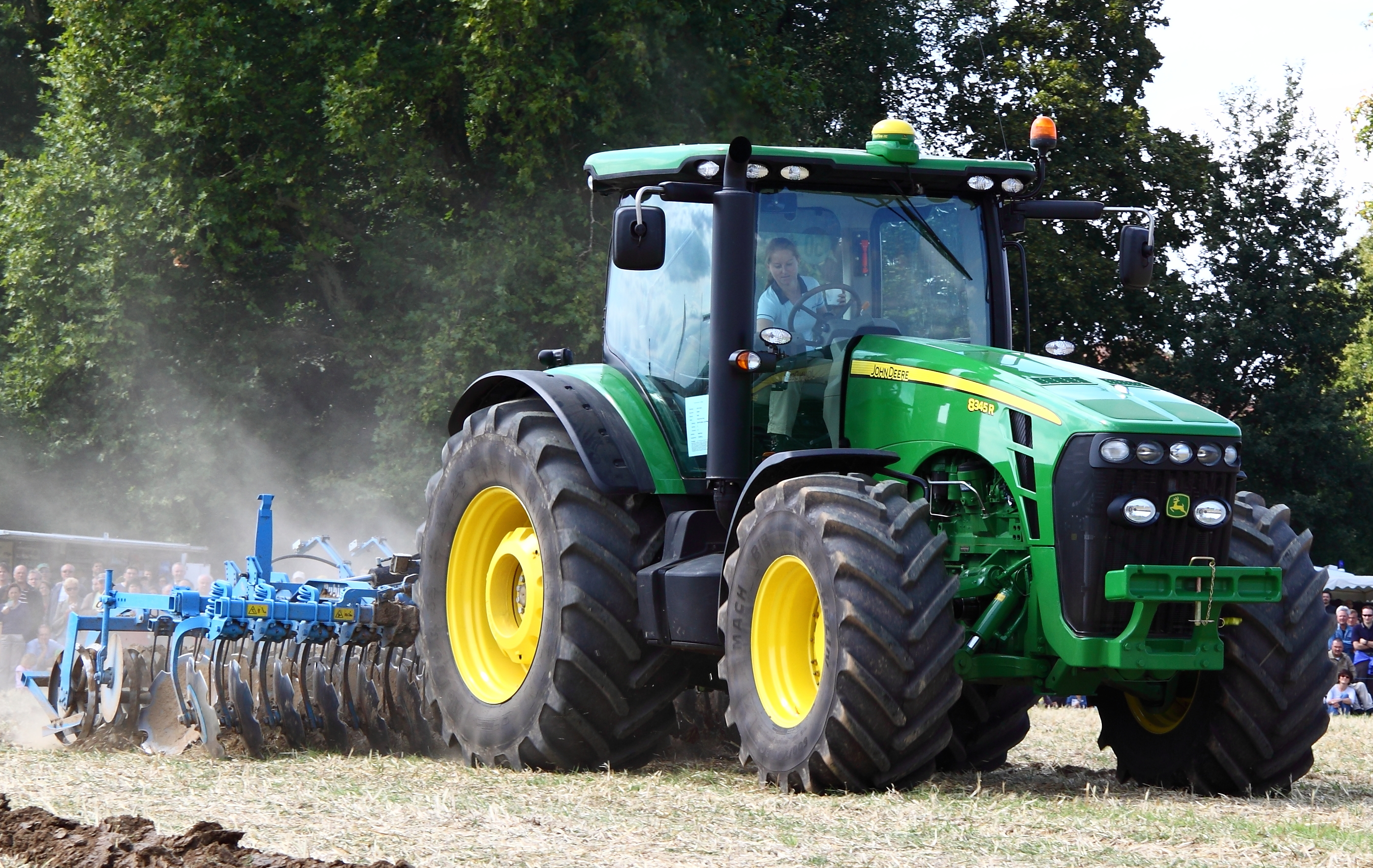
Tractor

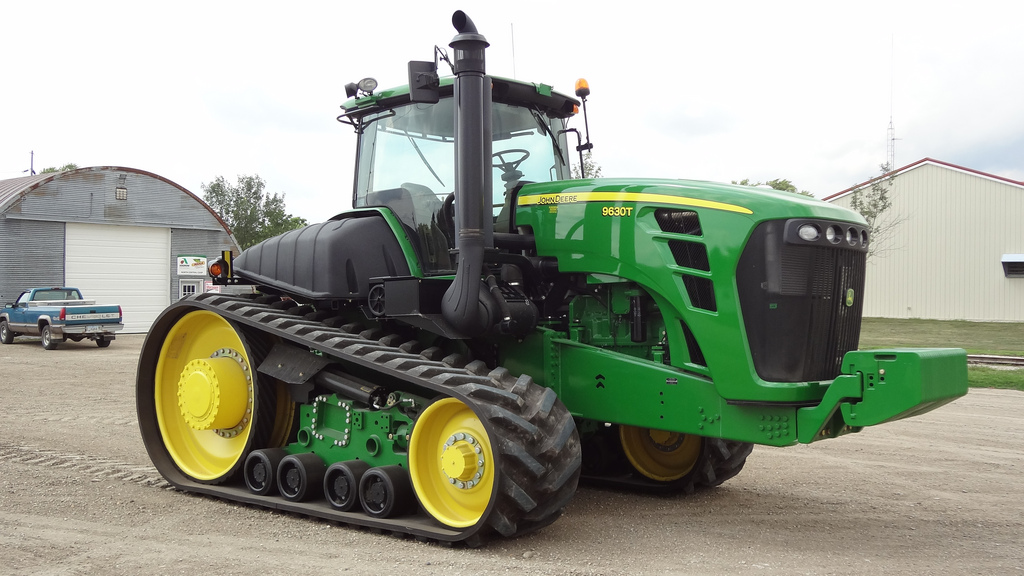
Tracked tractor (9630T)

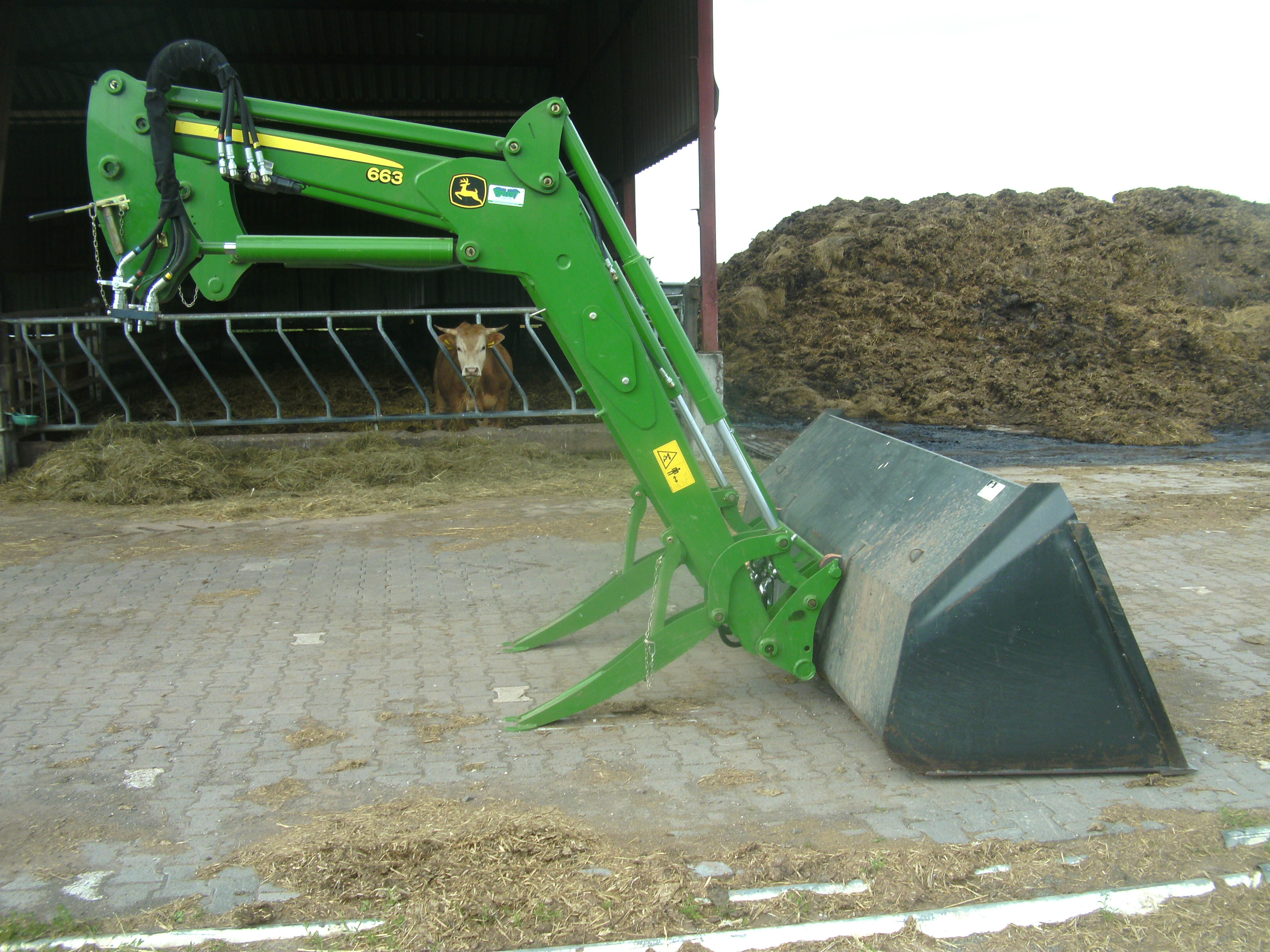
FEL attachment

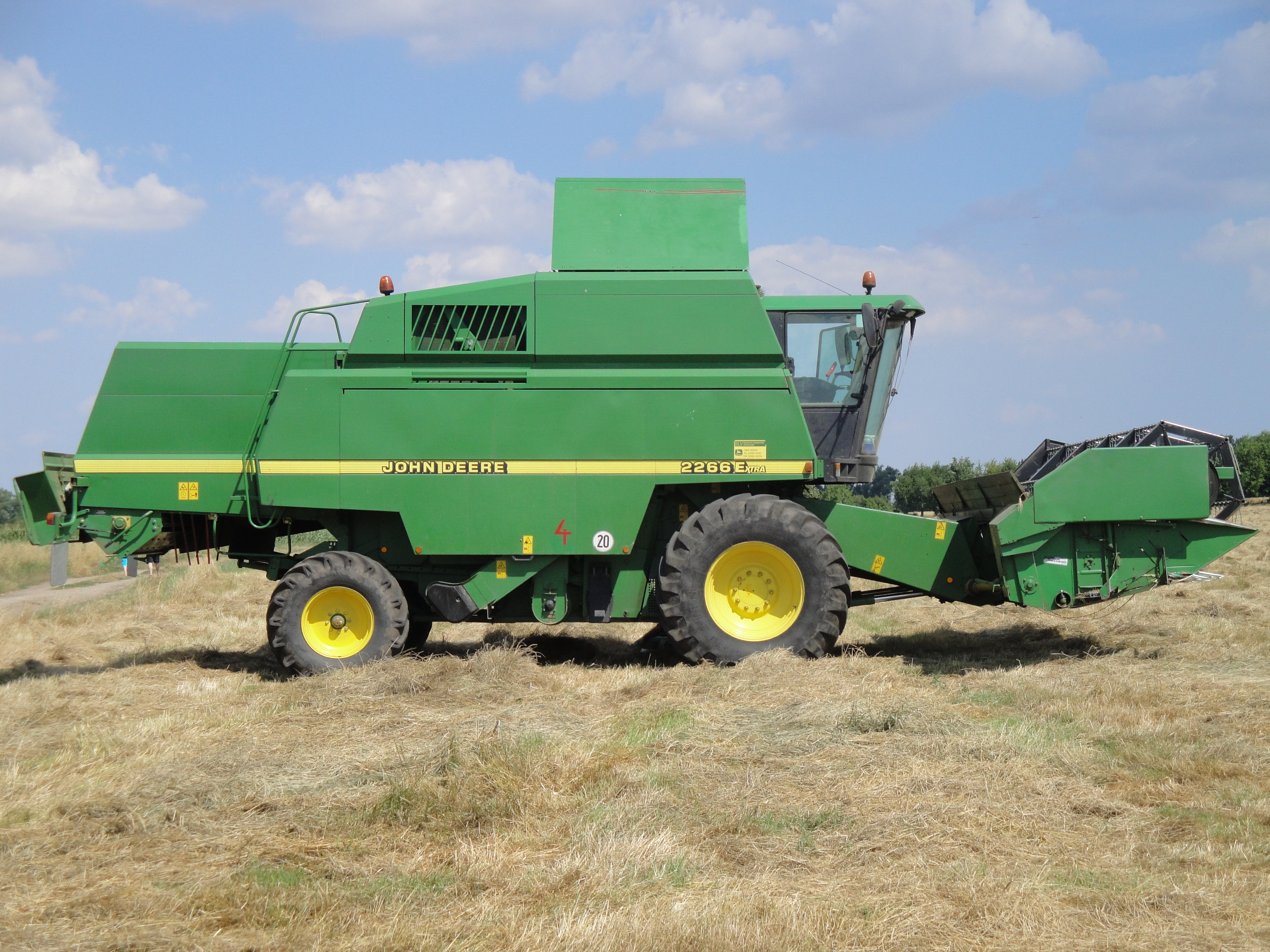
Combine harvester

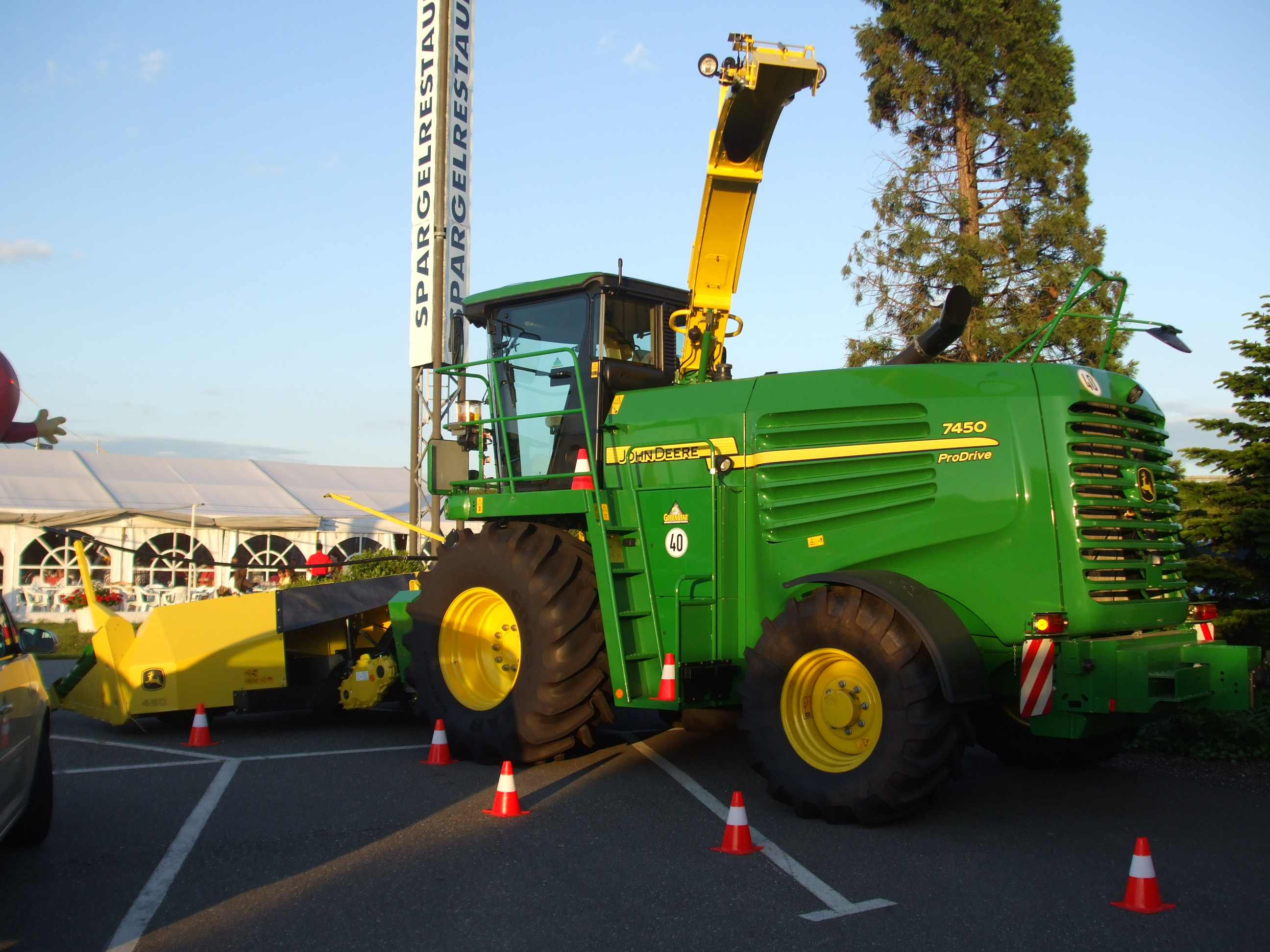
Forage harvester

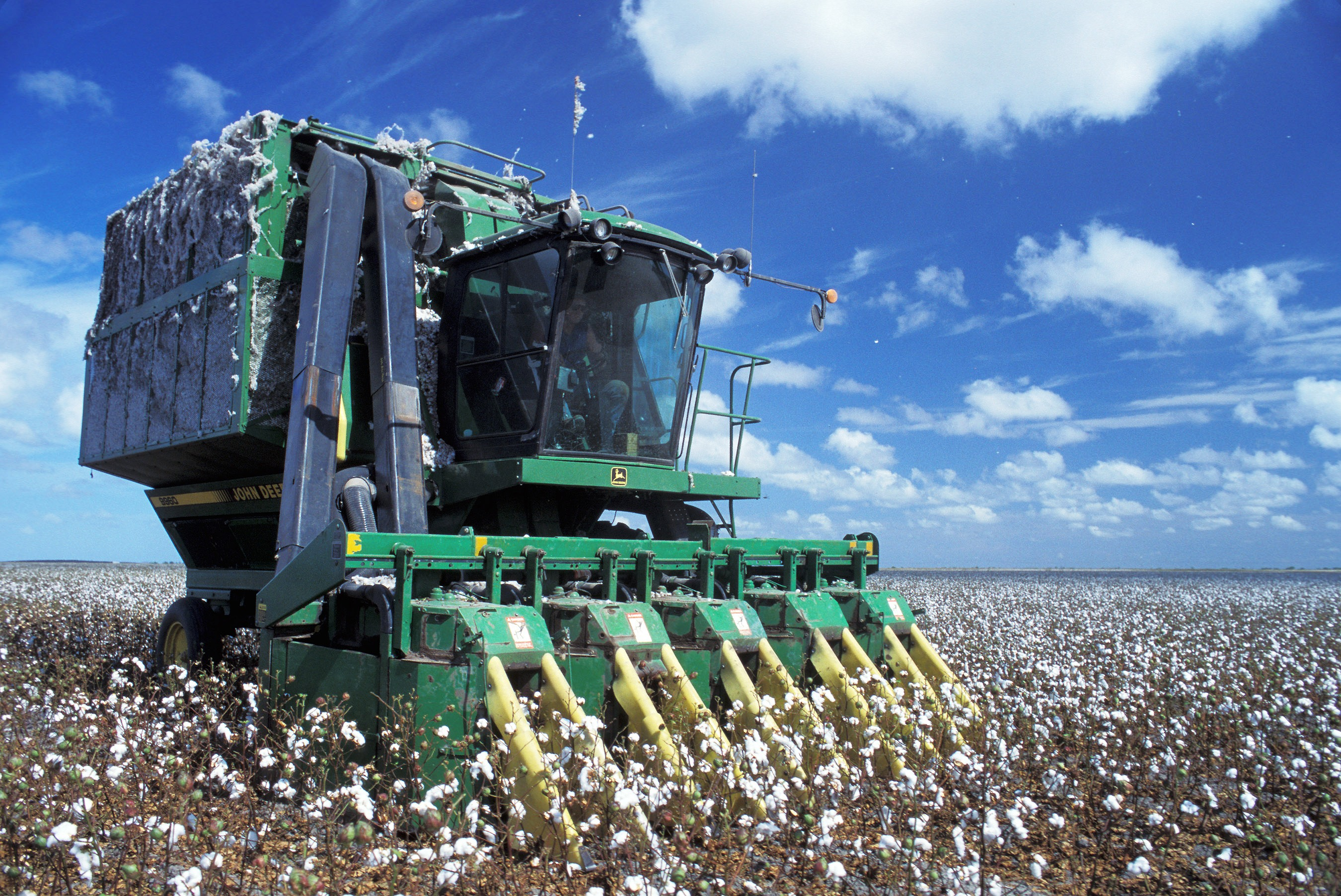
Cotton picker

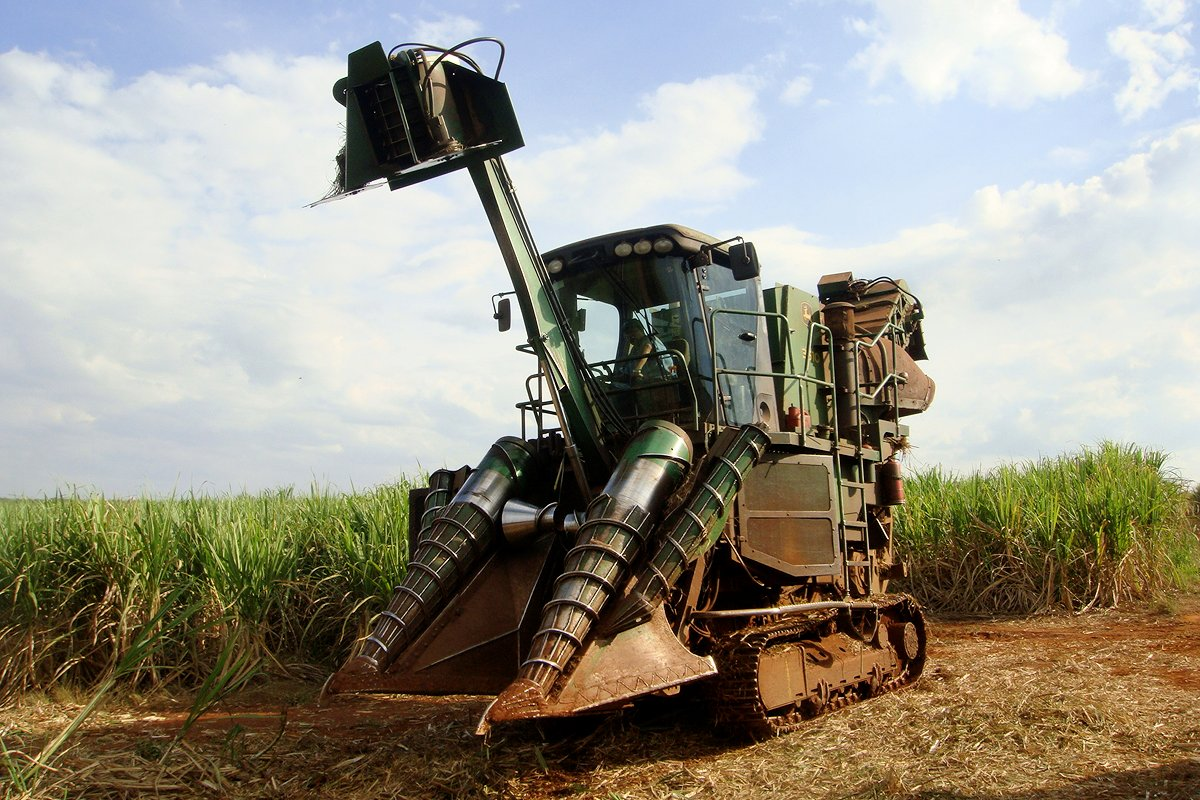
Sugarcane harvester

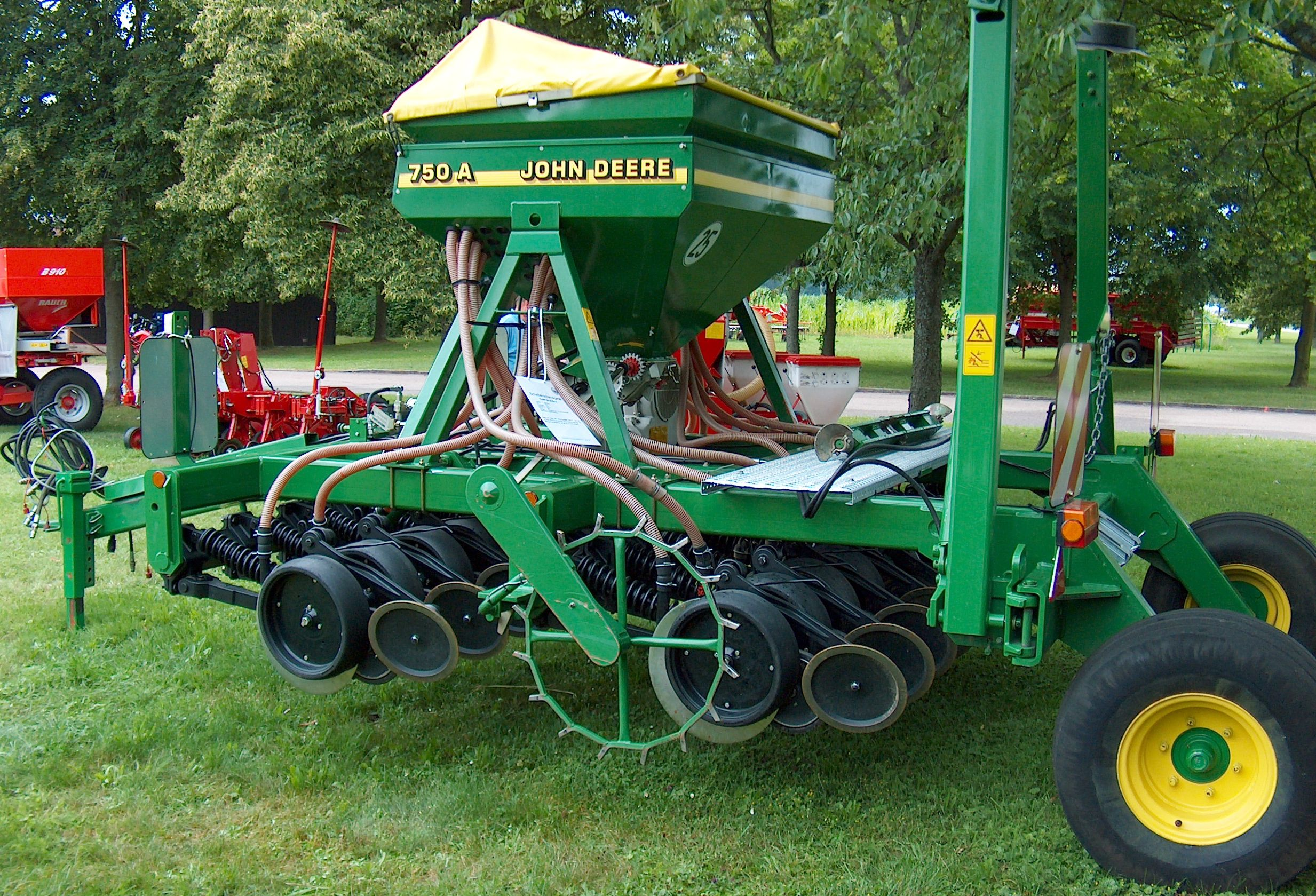
Seed drill

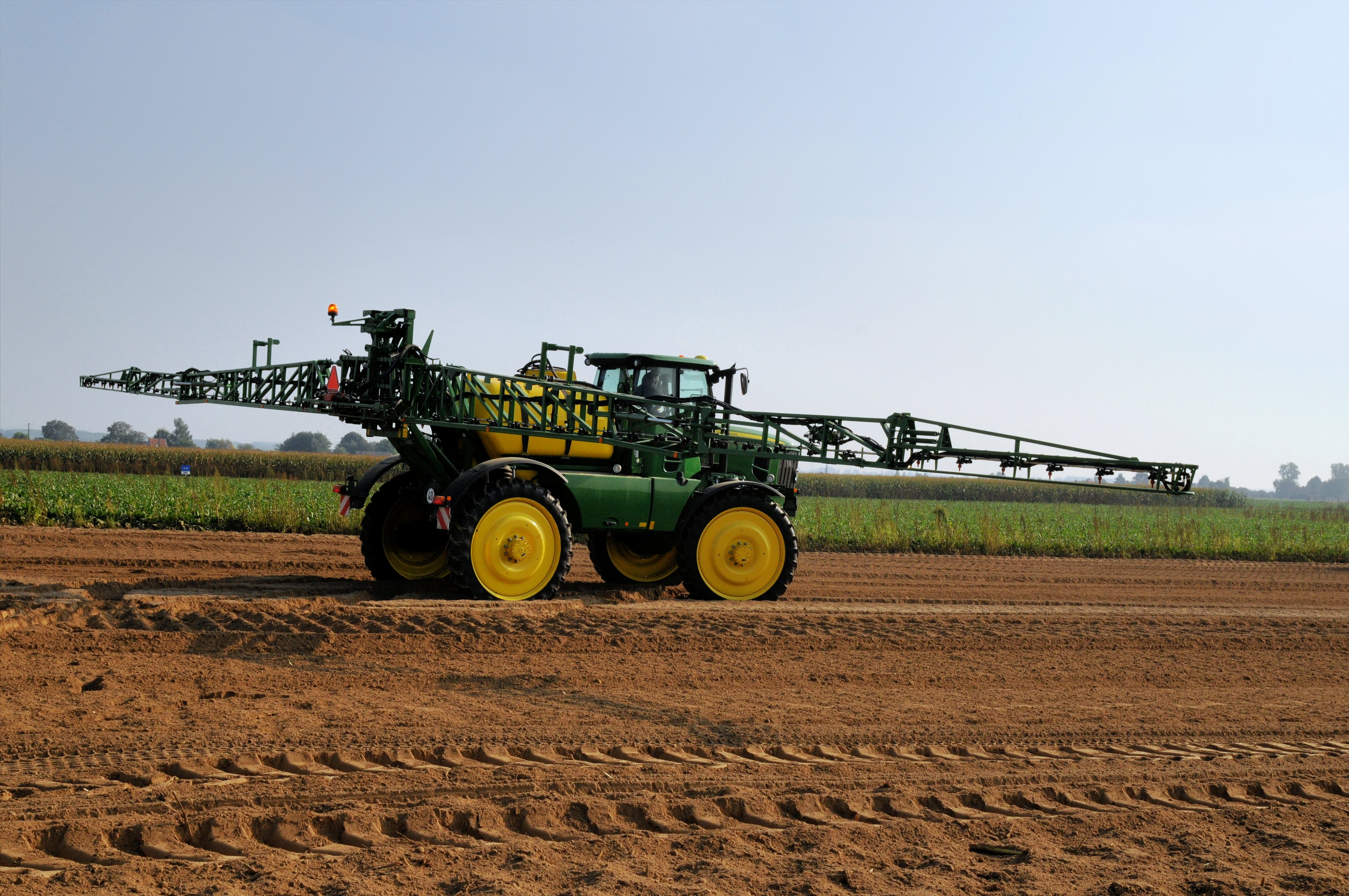
Field sprayer

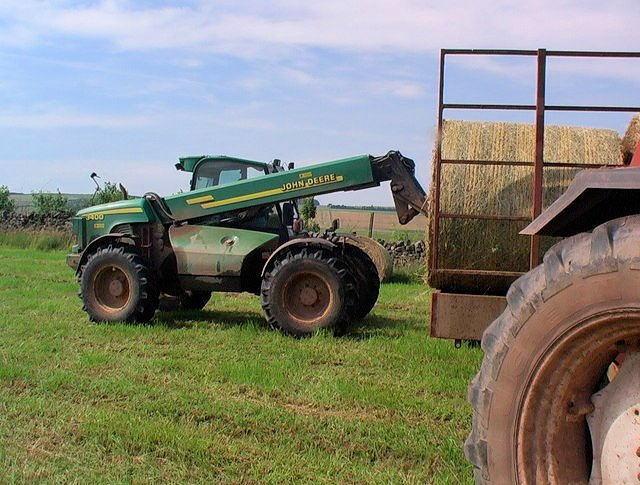
Telescopic handler

=== Construction equipment ===
Construction equipment includes (but is not limited to):

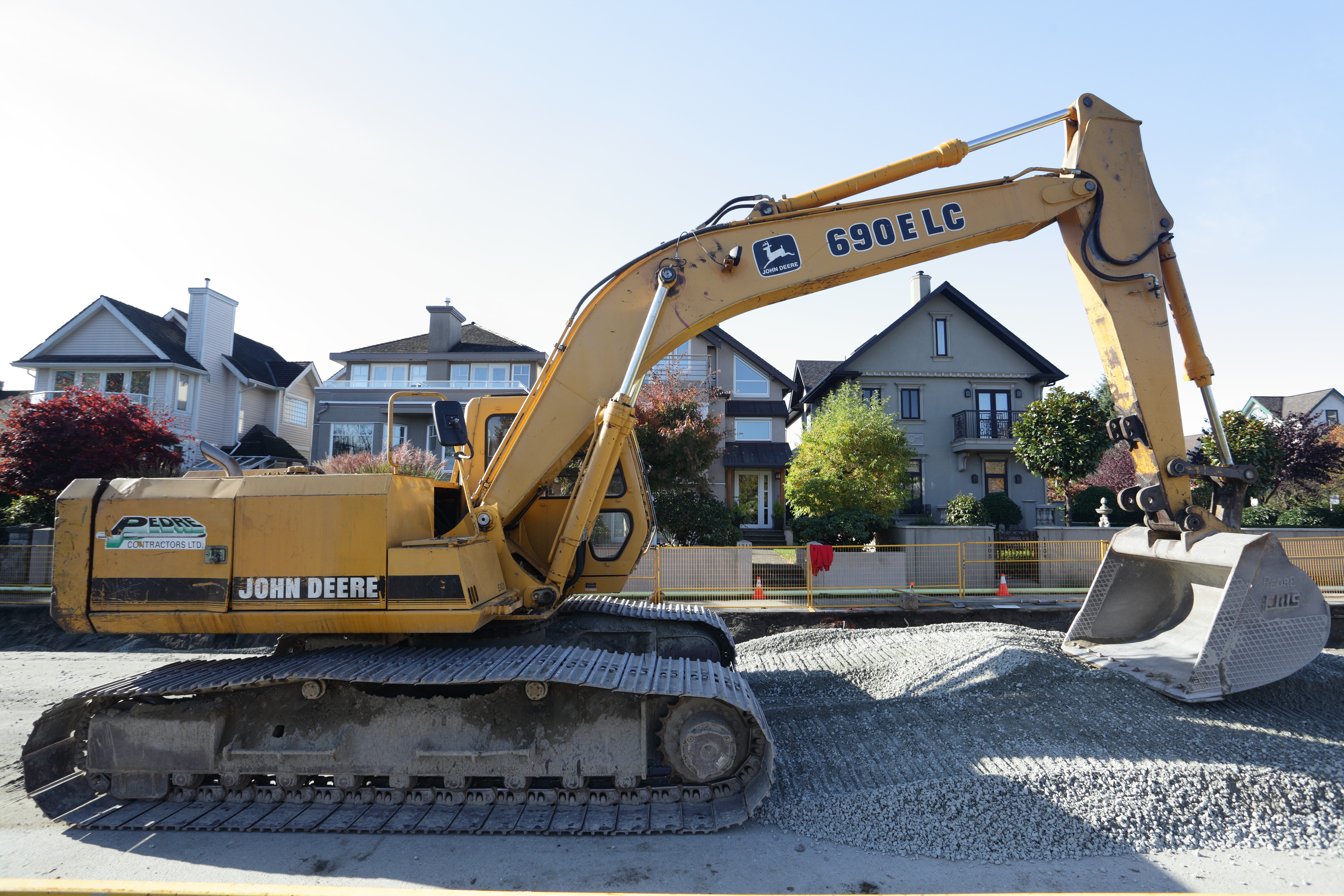
Excavator

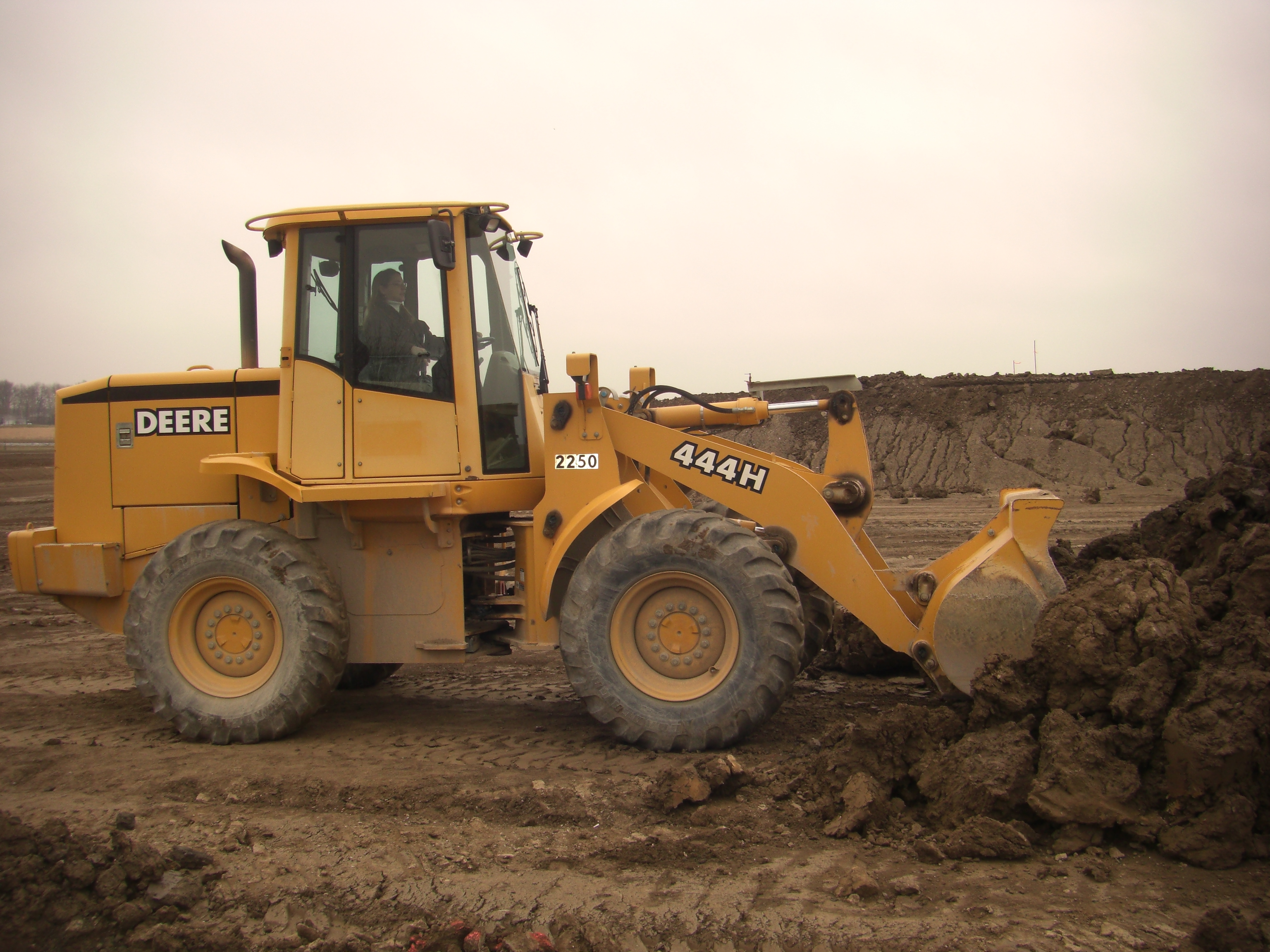
Loader

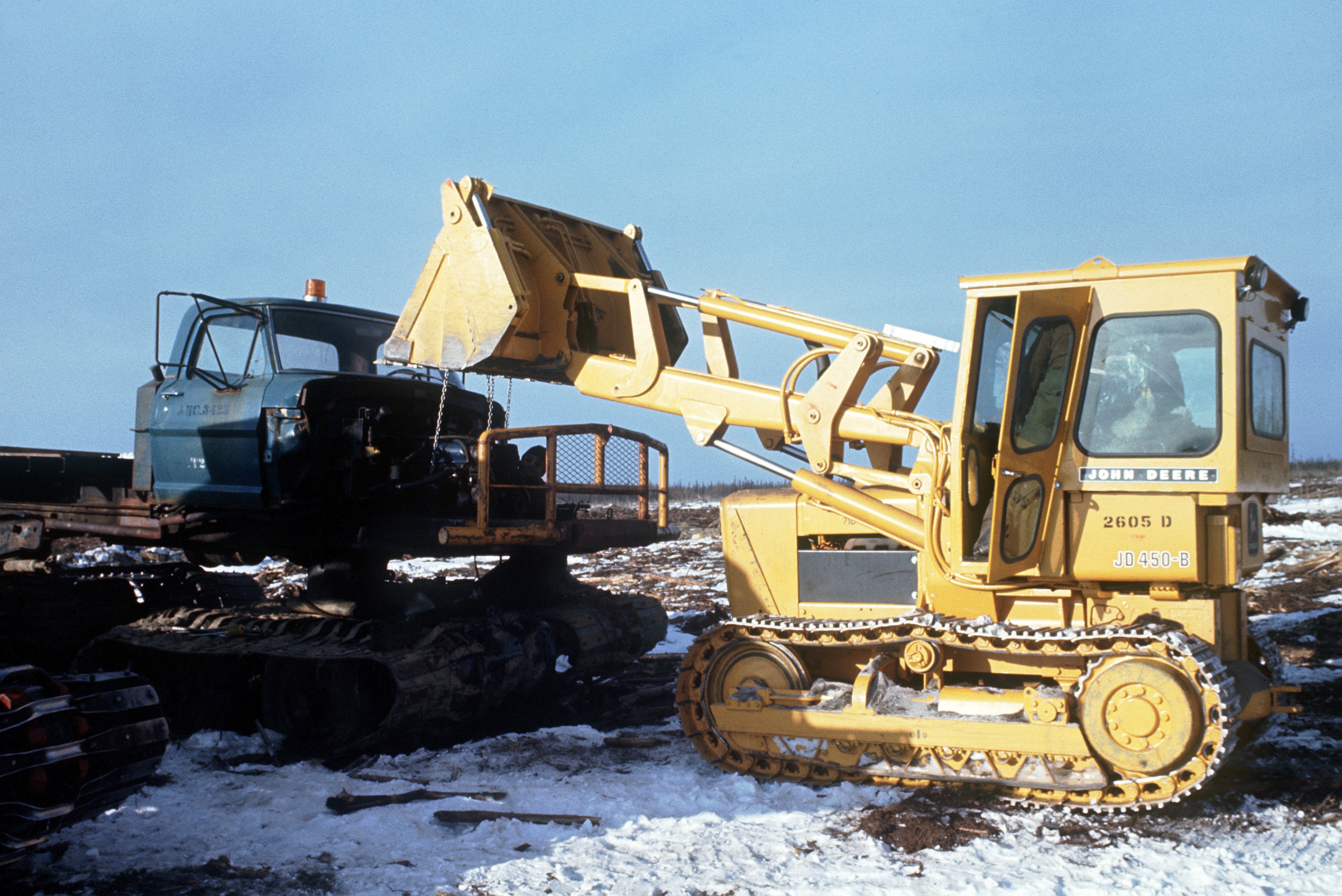
Tracked loader

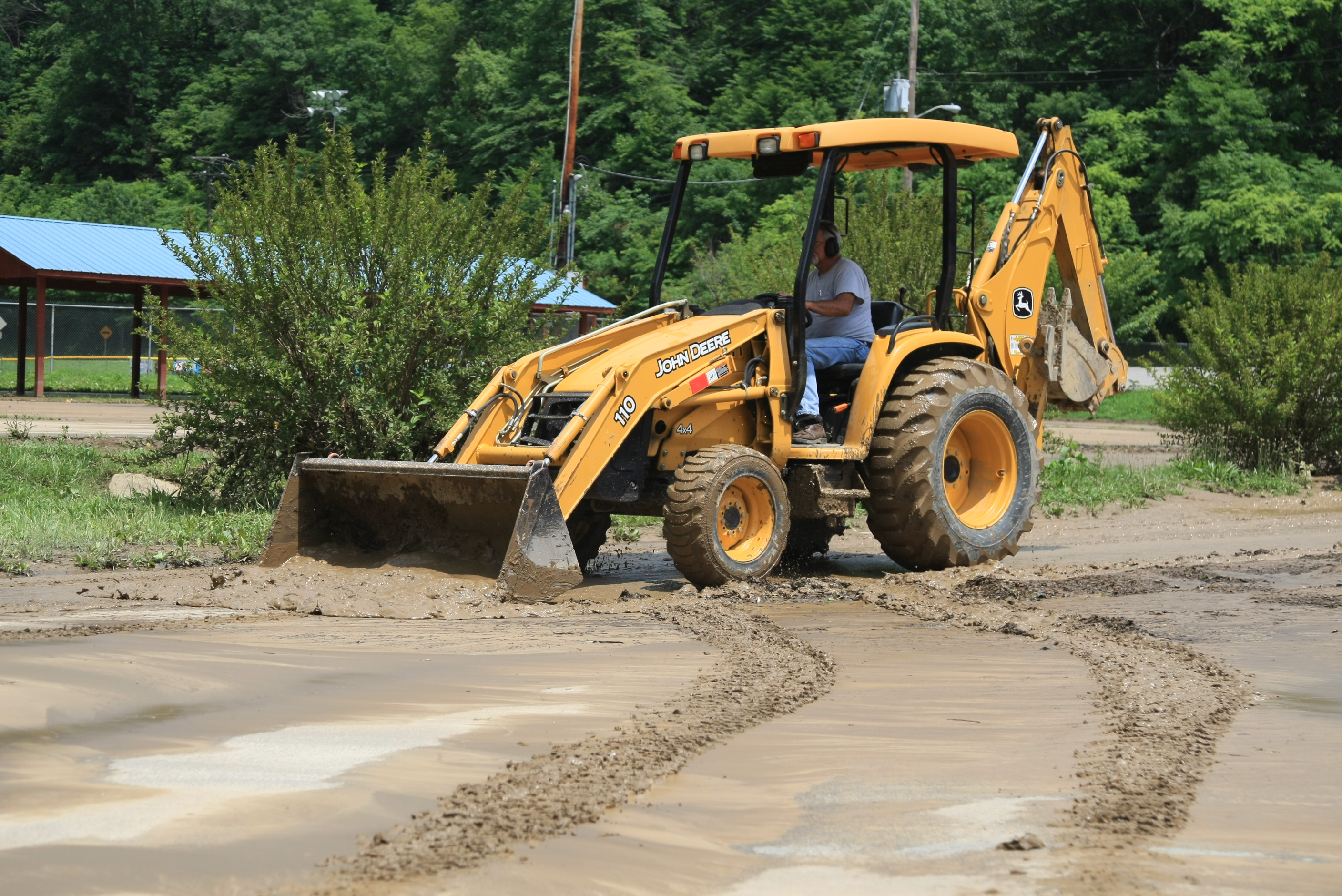
Backhoe

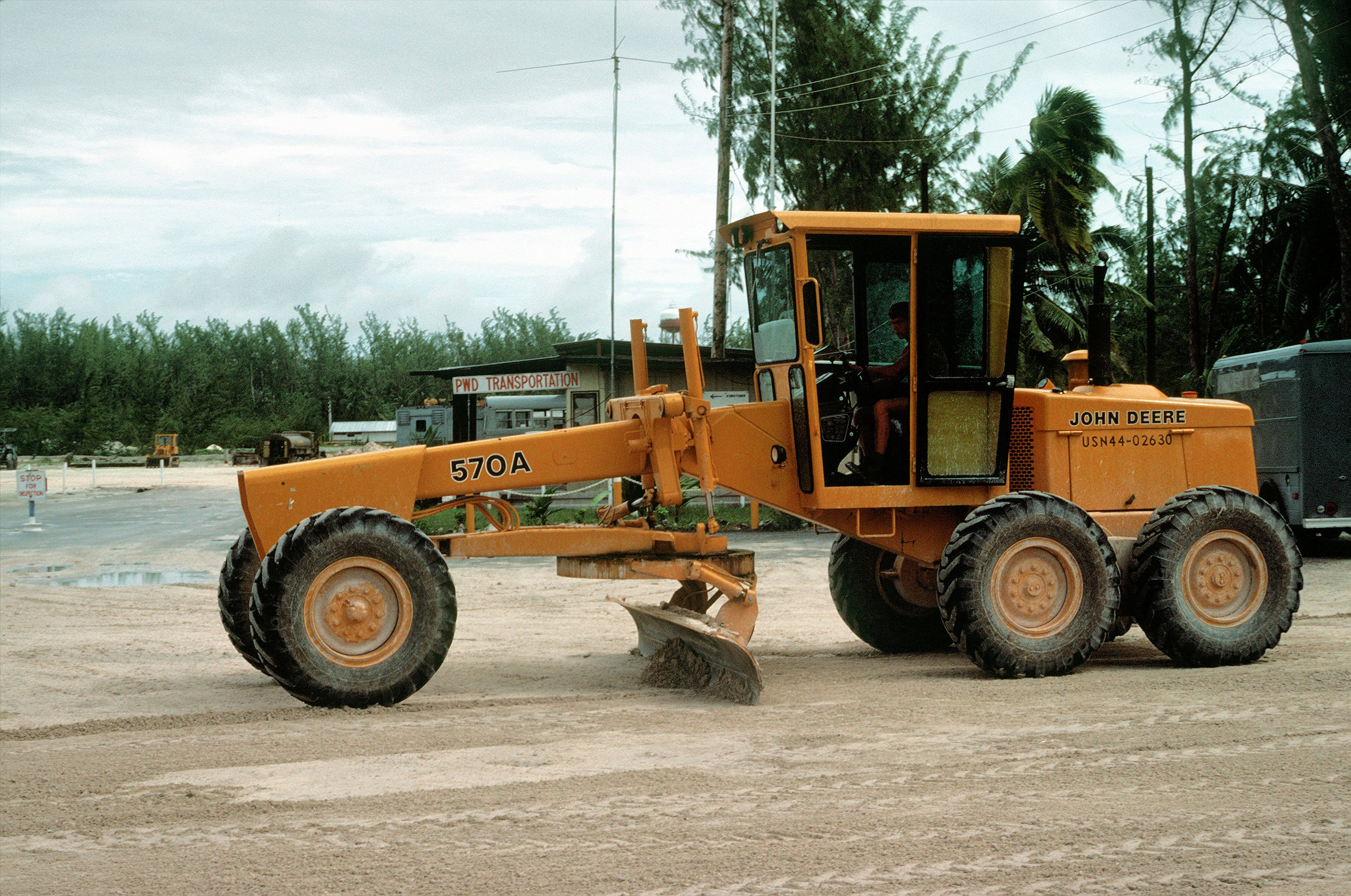
Grader

=== Forestry equipment ===
John Deere manufactures a range of forestry machinery, among others, harvesters, forwarders, skidders, feller bunchers and log loaders. Timberjack was a subsidiary of John Deere from 2000 to 2006.

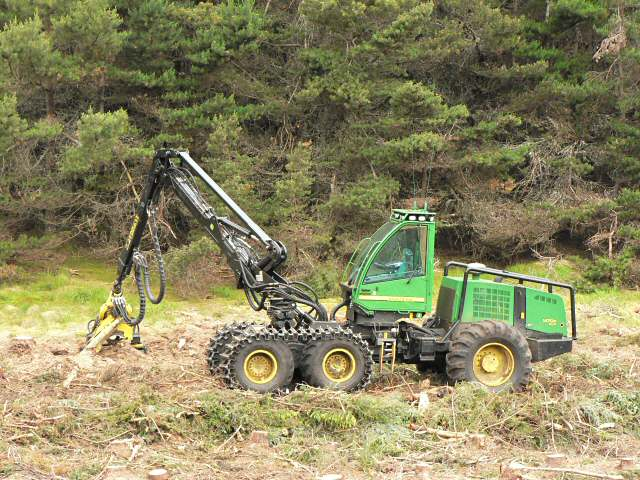
Harvester

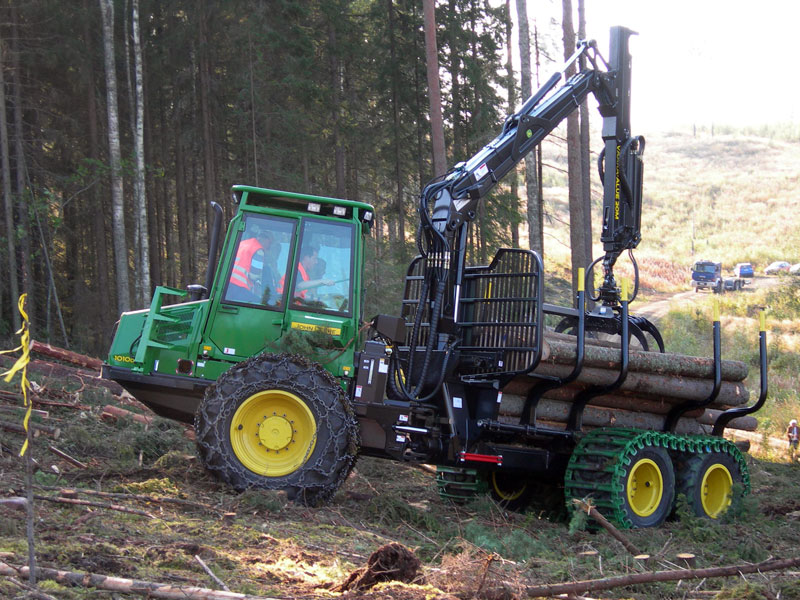
Forwarder

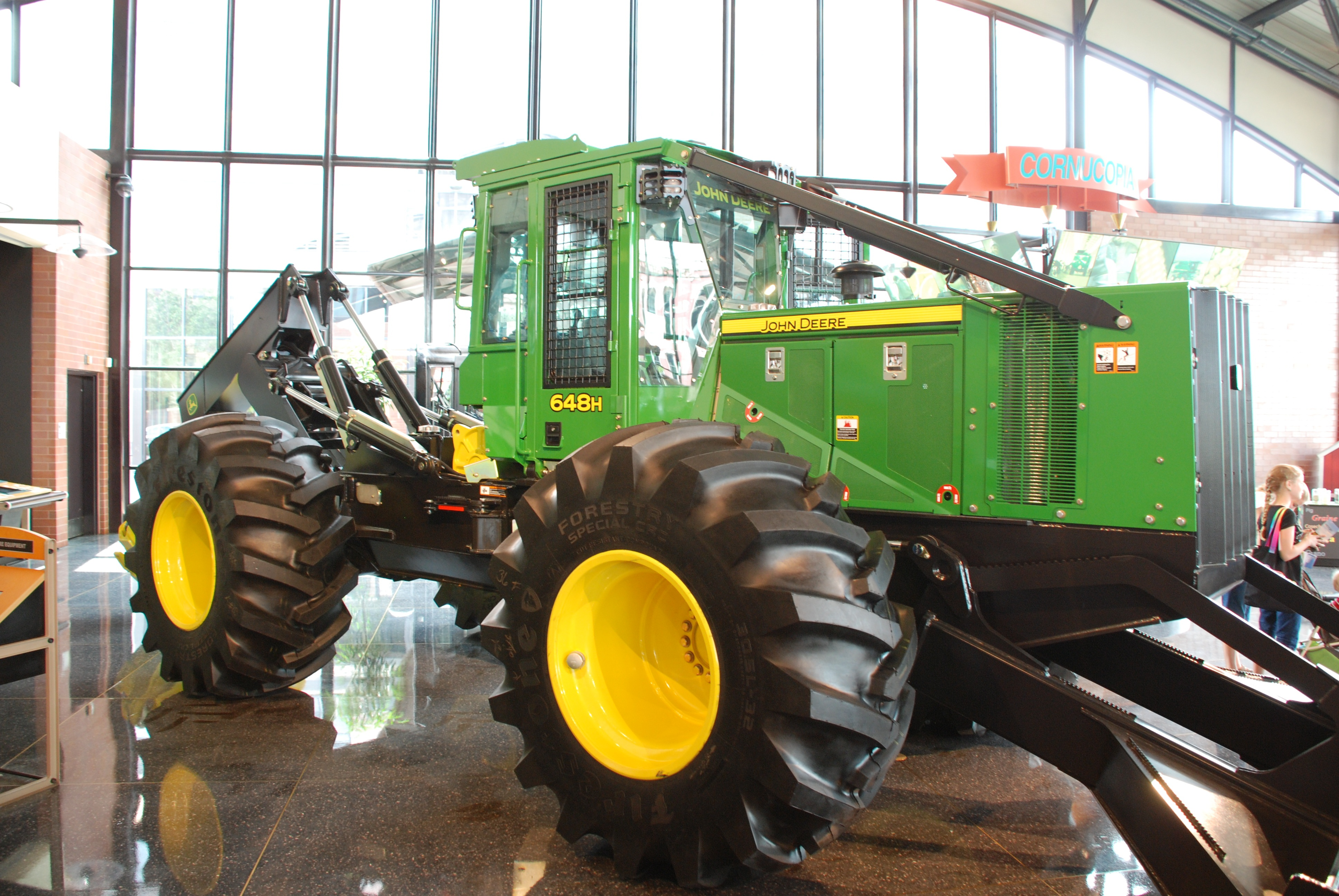
Skidder

=== Other products ===
Other products the company manufactures include consumer and commercial equipment such as lawn mowers, compact utility tractors, snow throwers, snowmobiles, all-terrain vehicles, and StarFire (a wide-area differential GPS). It is also a supplier of diesel engines and powertrains (axles, transmissions, etc.) used especially in heavy equipment.

John Deere leasing has expanded to non-equipment loans. As of 2017, this is the leading division of John Deere. With a loan portfolio of $2 billion, it accounts for a third of John Deere's income.

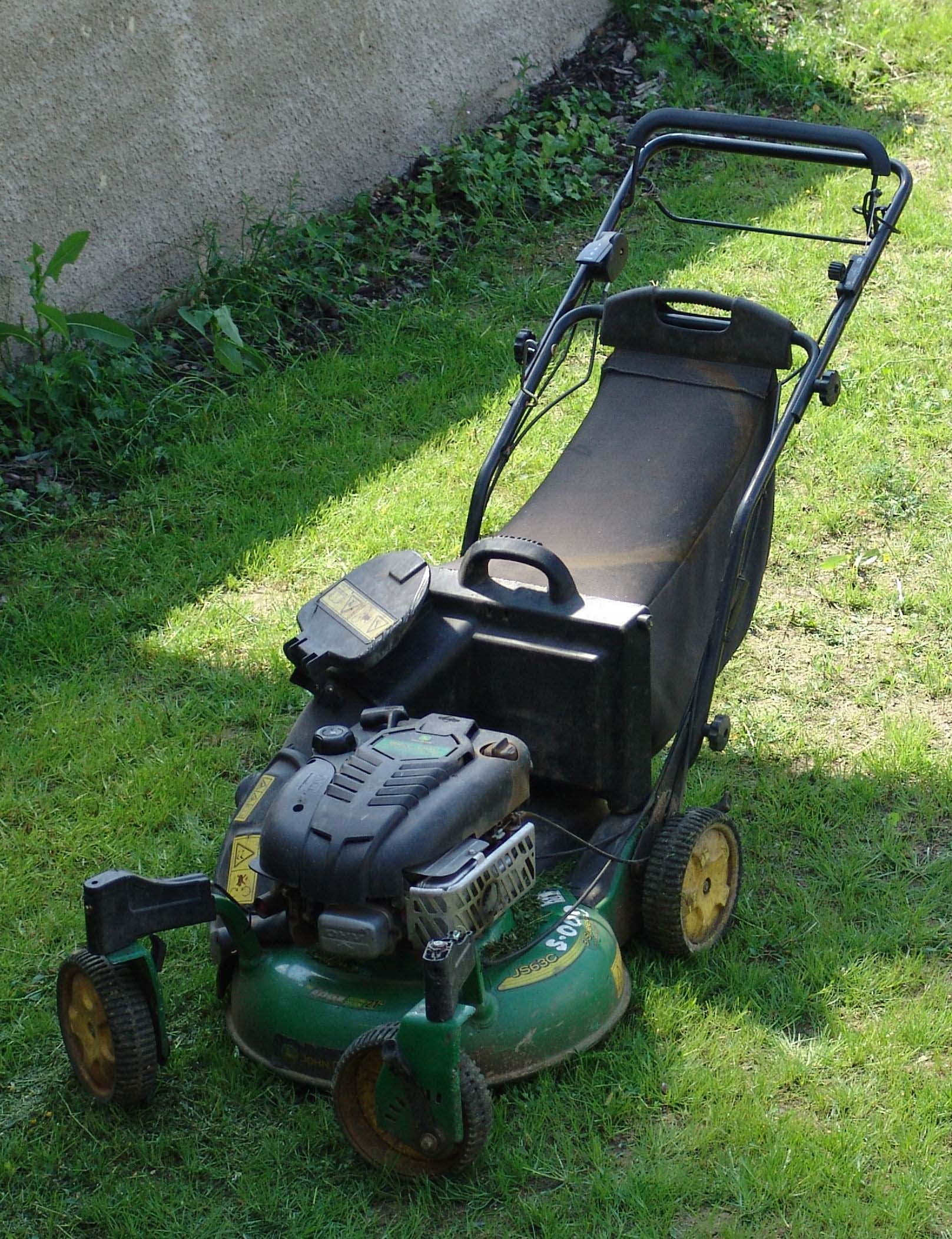
Lawn mower

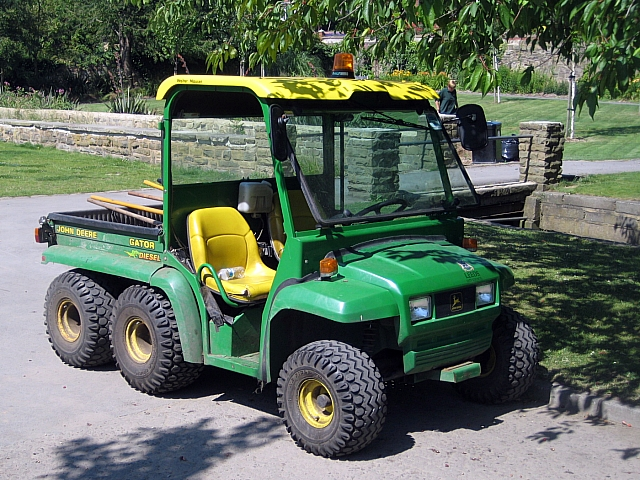
UTV (Gator)

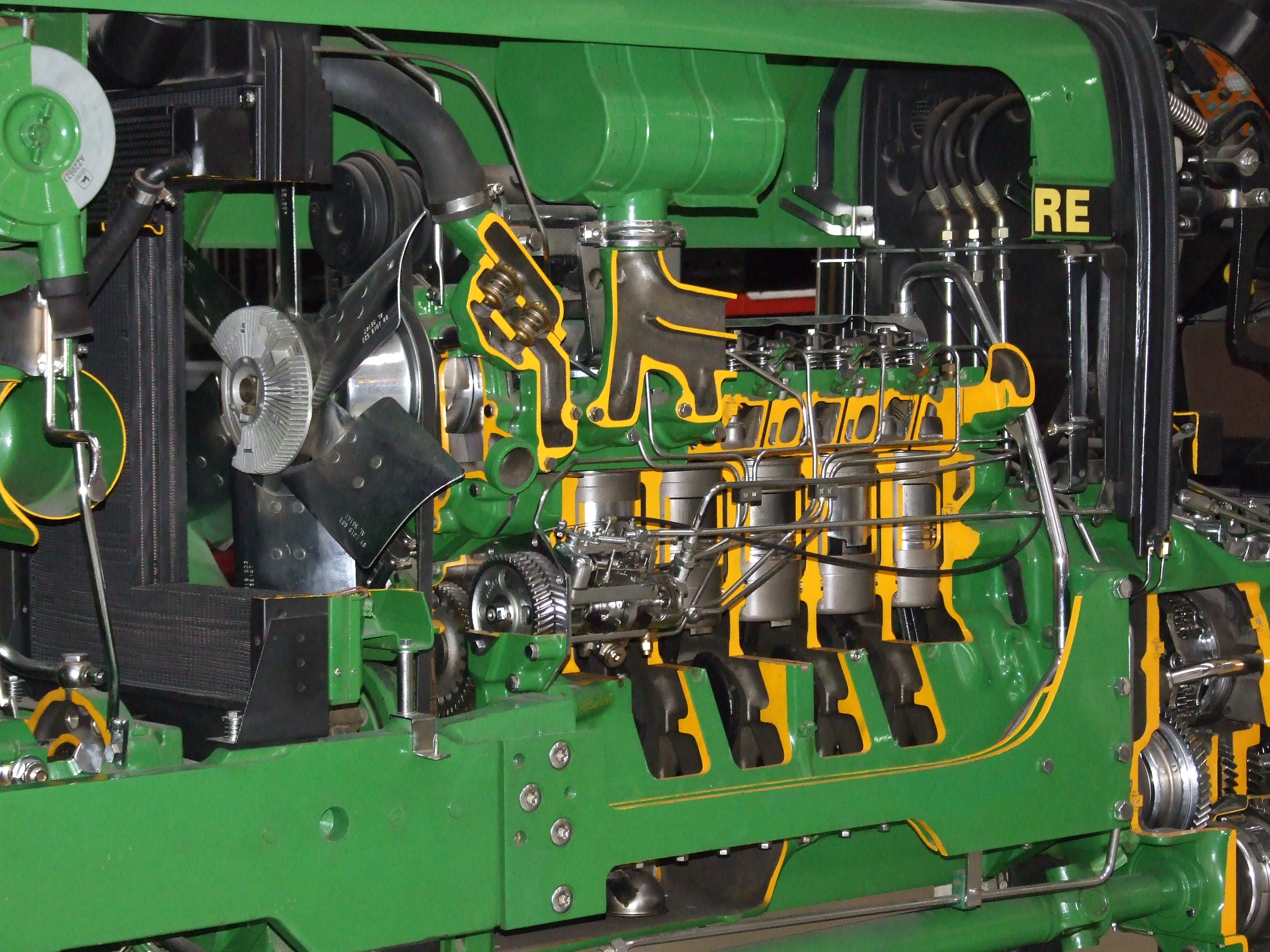
Diesel engine

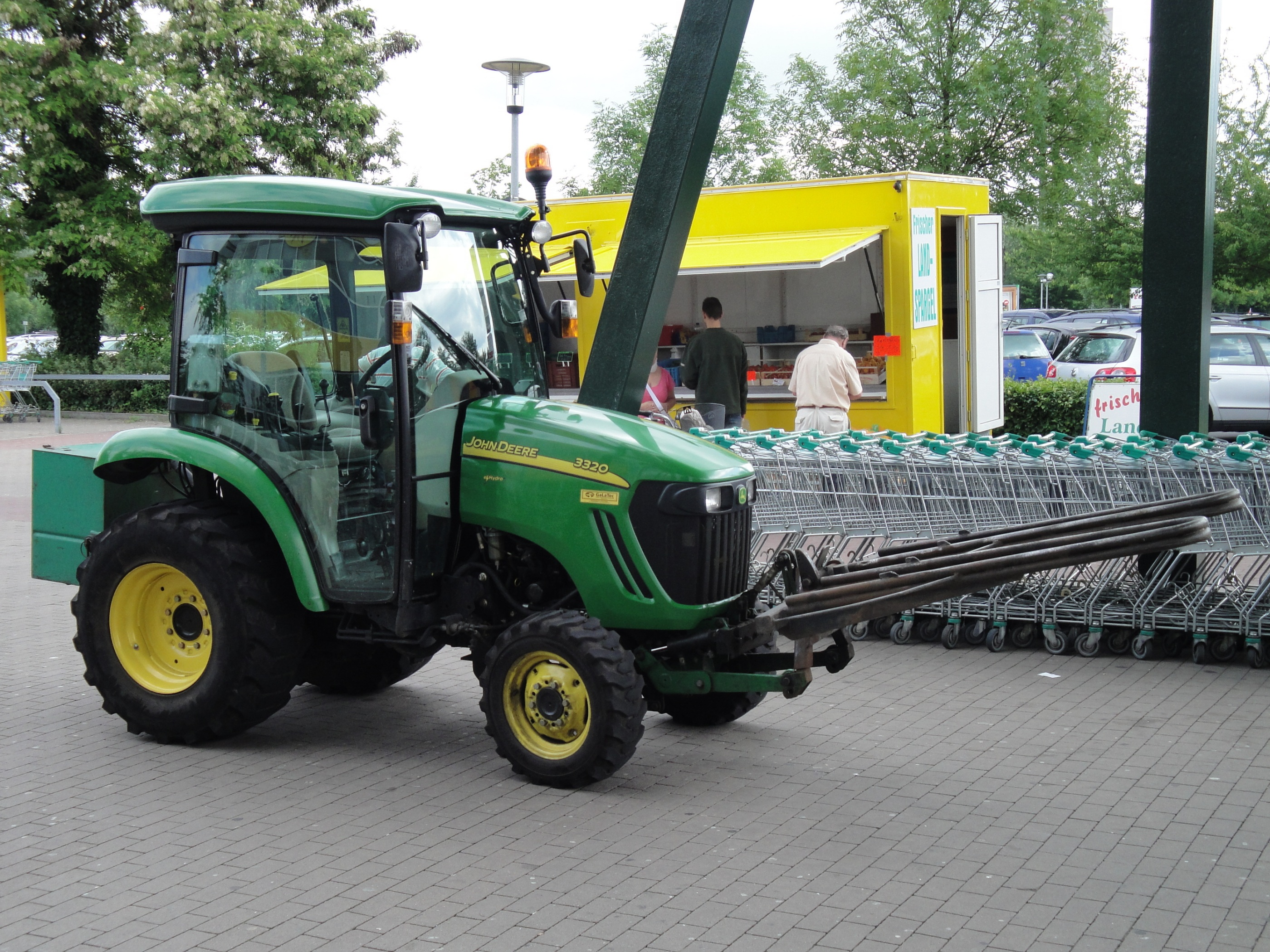
Compact utility tractor

== Factories ==
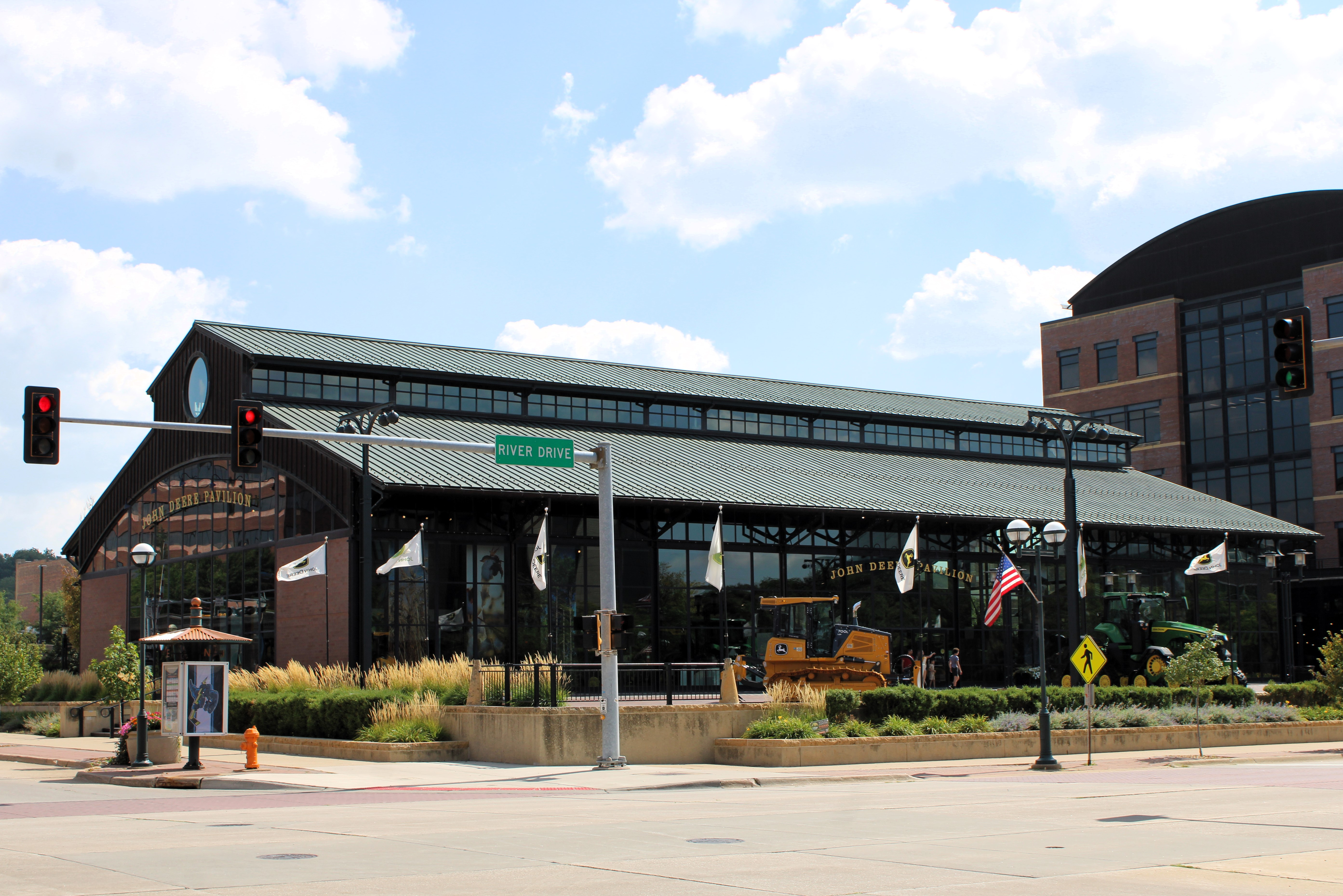
The John Deere Pavilion in Moline, Illinois

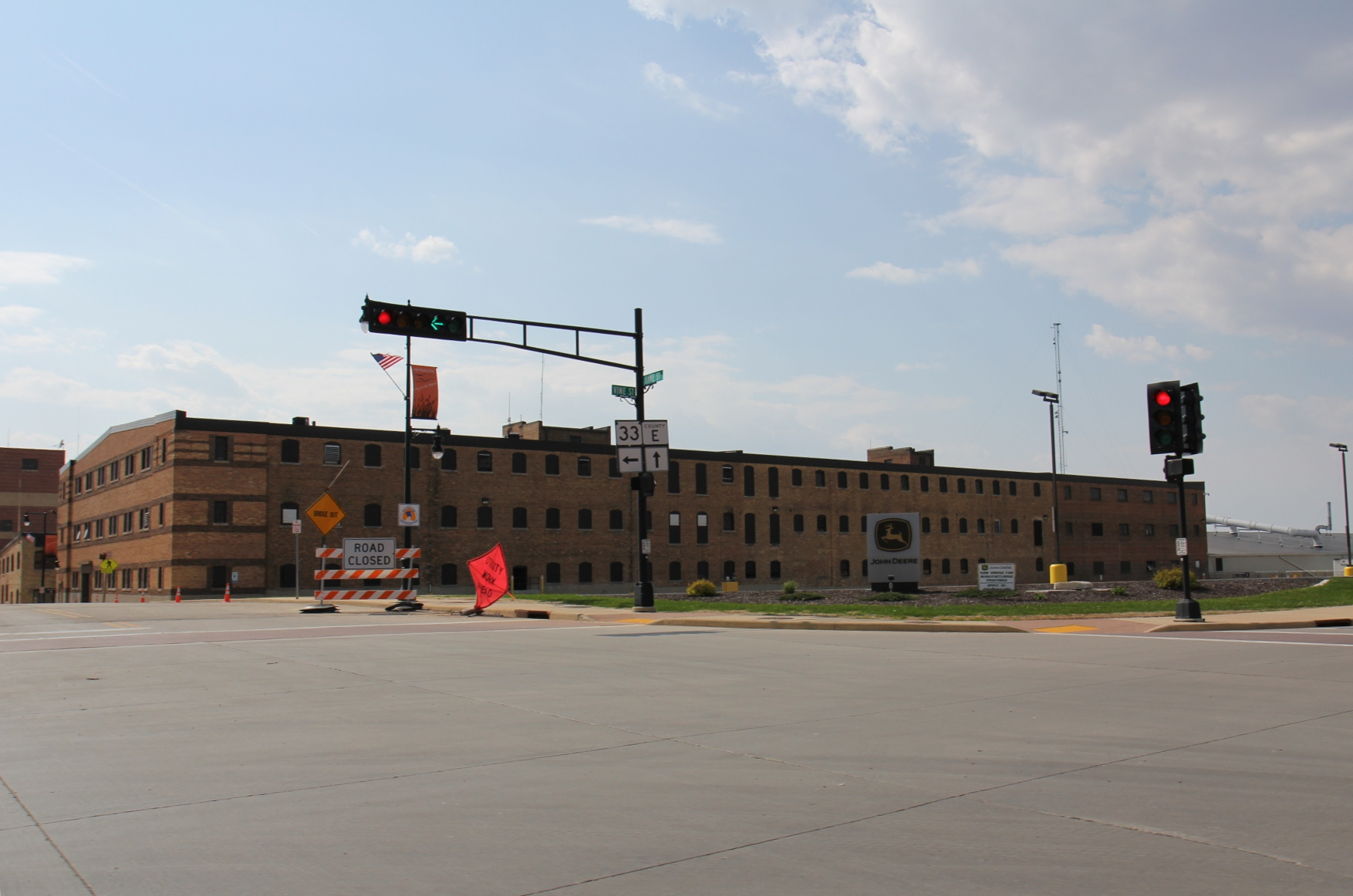
Horicon Works in Horicon, Wisconsin

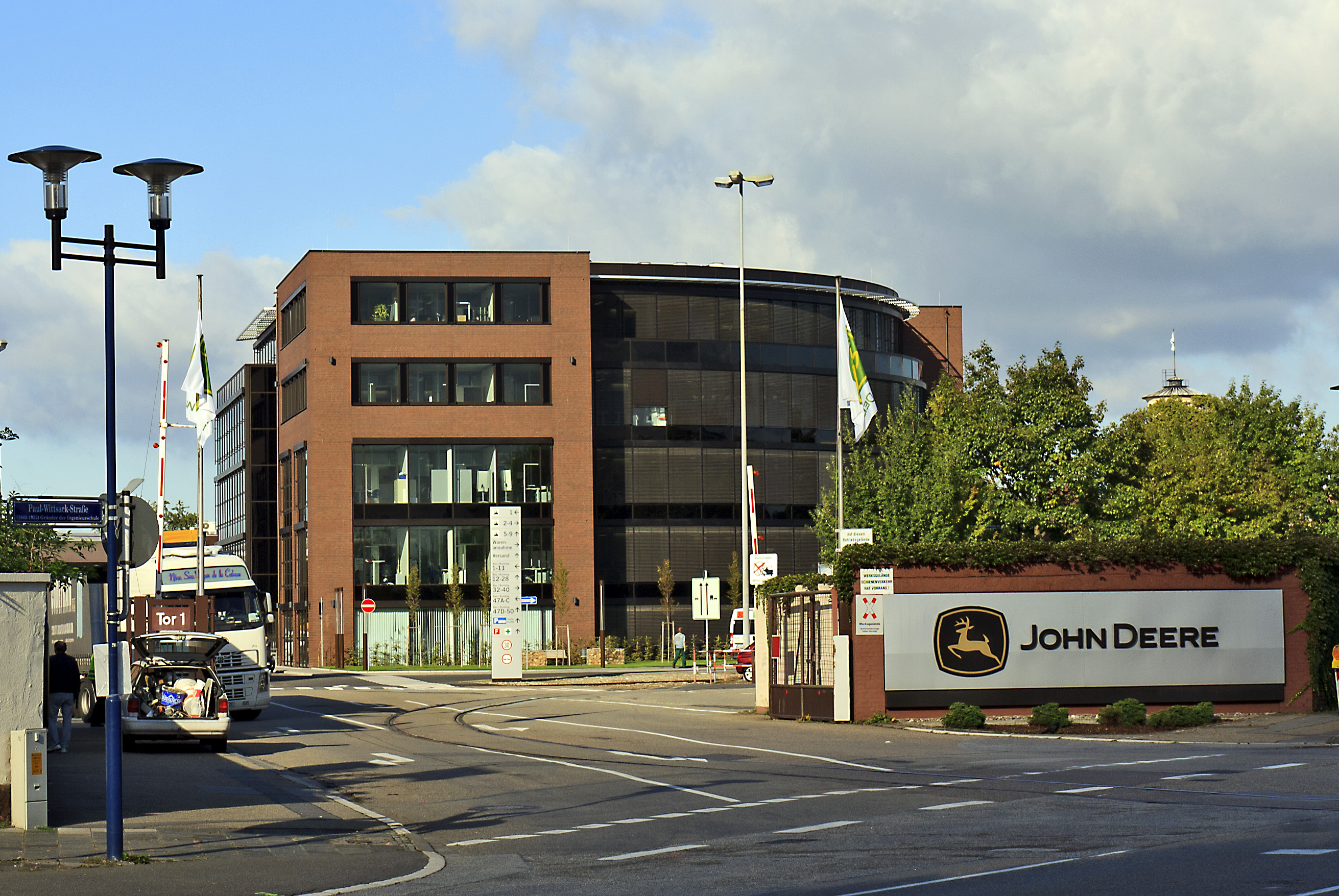
John Deere factory in Mannheim, Germany

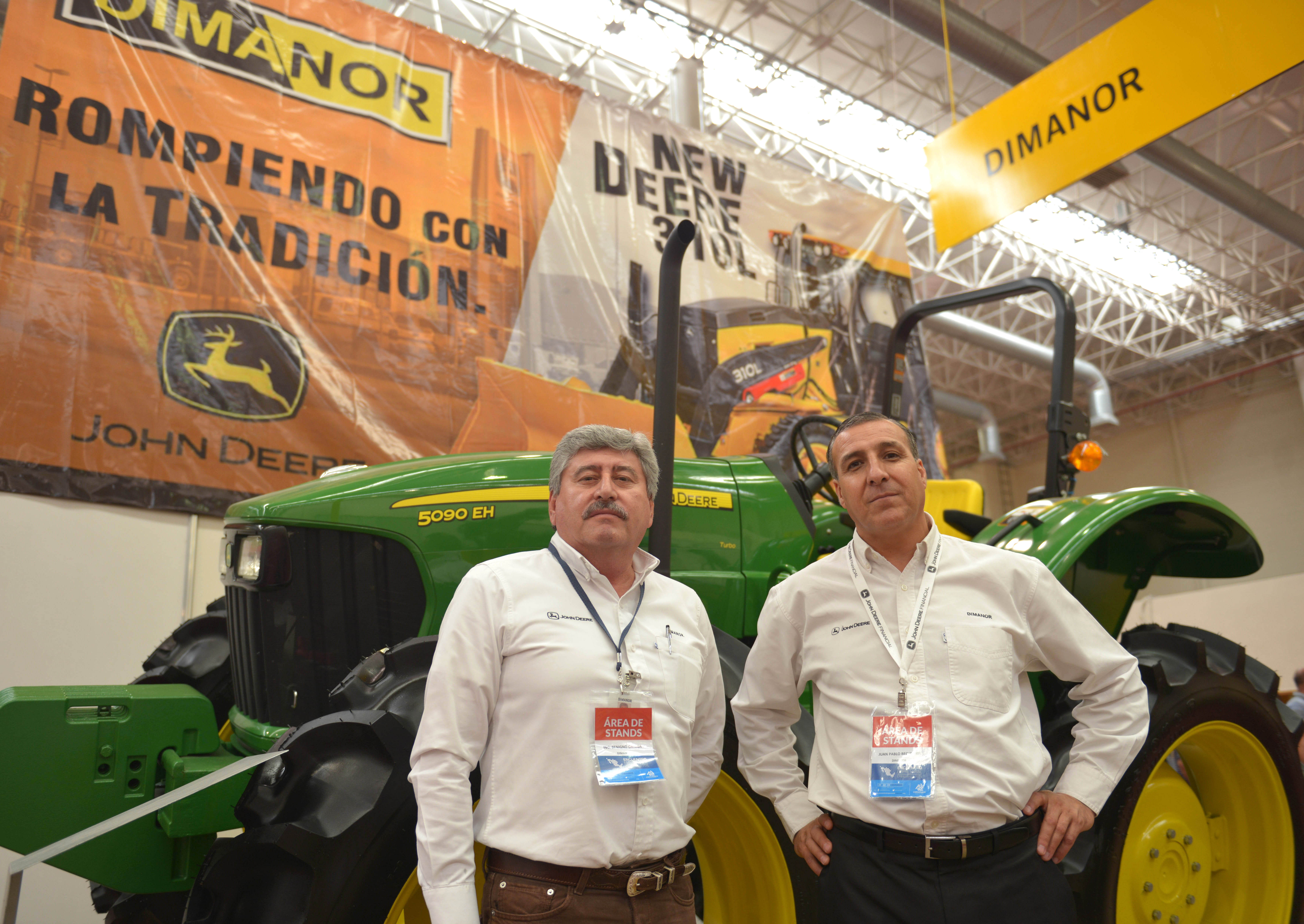
John Deere representatives at the Encuentro Empresarial Coparmex in Chihuahua, Mexico

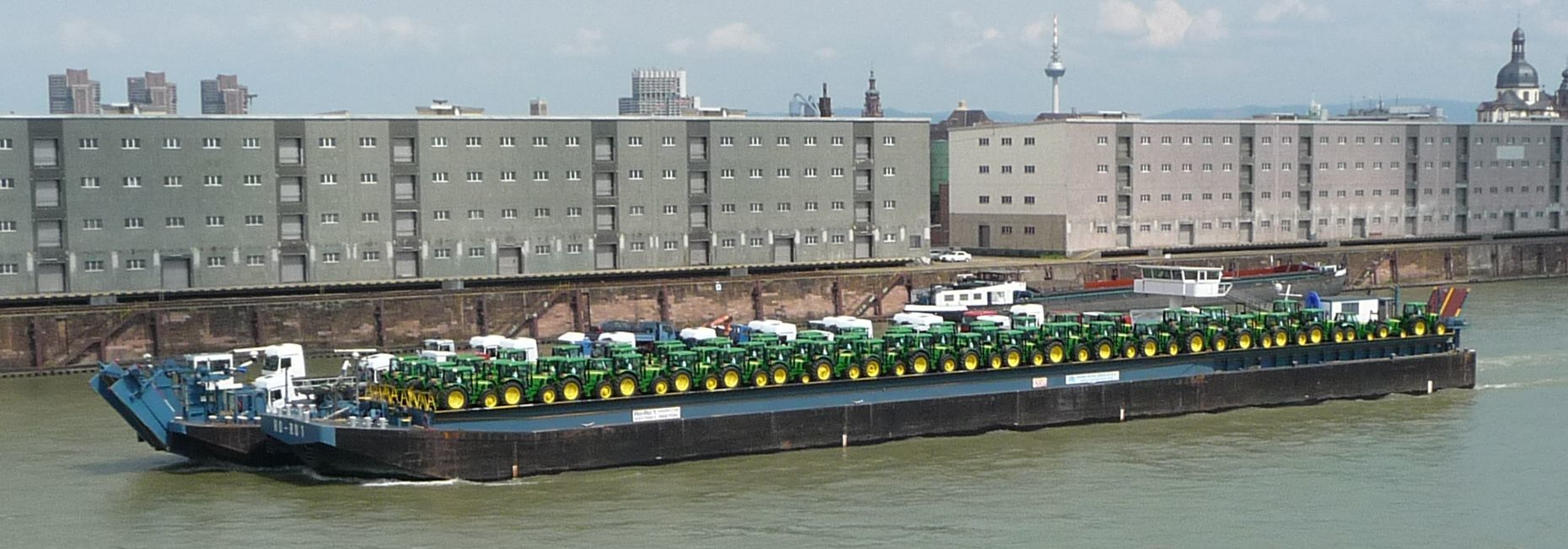
New John Deere tractors on a barge, Mannheim Harbour

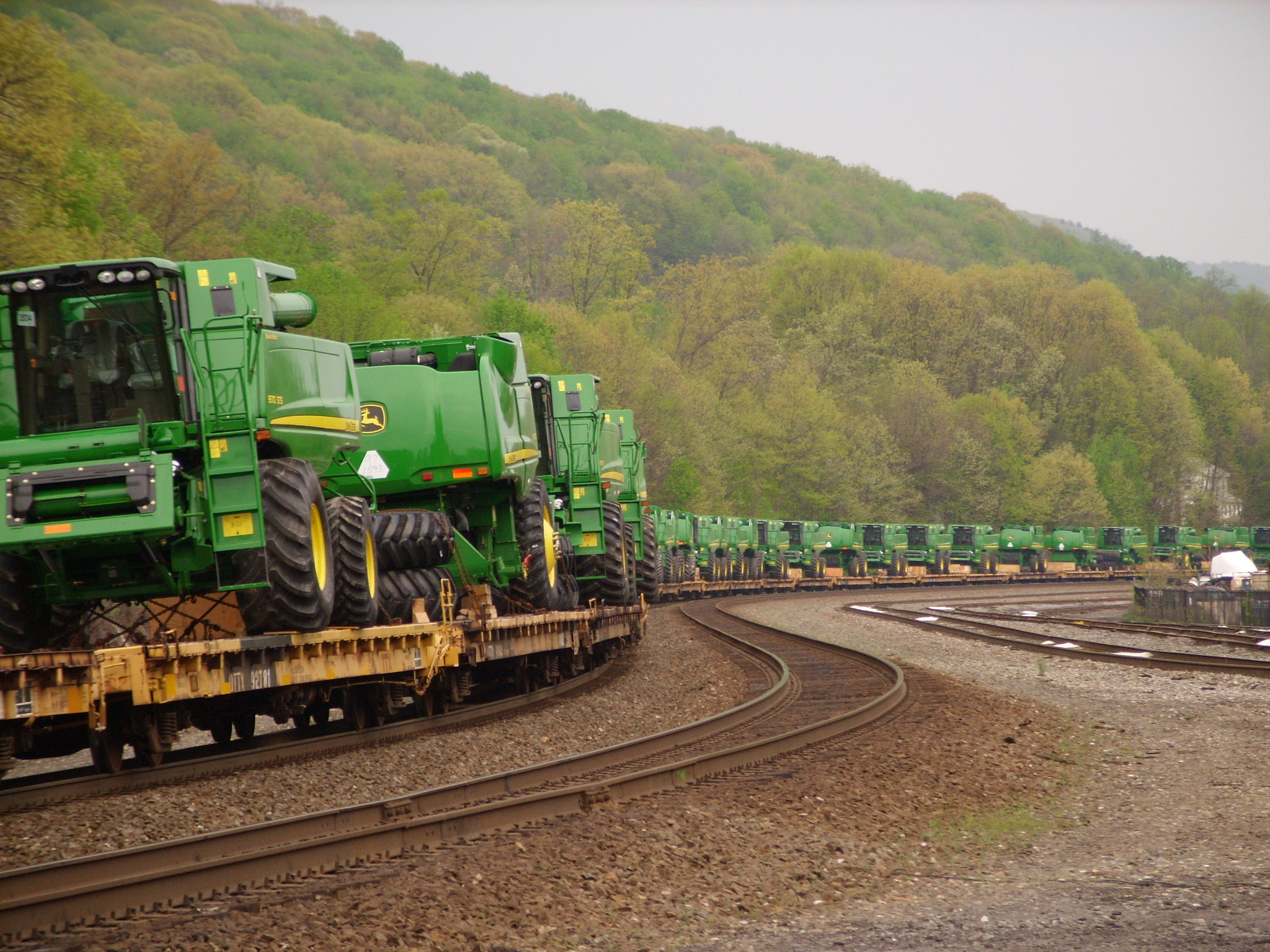
John Deere Combine harvesters being transported by railway on goods wagons in Tyrone, Pennsylvania, in the United States

Major North American factories include:

- Harvester Works (large combine harvesters), East Moline, Illinois
- Cylinder Internal Platform (hydraulic cylinders), Moline, Illinois
- Seeding Group (planting equipment), Moline, Illinois and Valley City, North Dakota
- Davenport Works (wheel loaders, motor graders, articulated dump trucks, wheeled forestry equipment), Davenport, Iowa
- Dubuque Works (backhoes, crawlers, skid-steer loaders, tracked forestry equipment), Dubuque, Iowa
- Des Moines Works (tillage equipment, cotton harvesters, sprayers, and fertilizer spreaders), Ankeny, Iowa
- Ottumwa Works (hay and forage equipment), Ottumwa, Iowa
- Thibodaux Works (cane-harvesting equipment, scrapers), Thibodaux, Louisiana
- Horicon Works (lawn and garden and turf care), Horicon, Wisconsin
- Augusta Works (small commercial and agricultural tractors), Grovetown, Georgia
- Turf Care (specialty golf equipment and commercial mowing), Fuquay-Varina, North Carolina
- Industrias John Deere (agricultural tractors; construction equipment), (Monterrey, Mexico)
- Motores John Deere (power systems; 6- and 4-cylinder engines, heavy-duty axles), Torreon, Mexico
- Coffeyville Works (transmissions, pump drives, planetaries), Coffeyville, Kansas
- Waterloo Works (tractor, cab, and assembly operations, drivetrain operations, foundry operations, service parts operations), Waterloo, Iowa
- Power Systems and Engine Works (power systems and engines), Waterloo, Iowa
- Greeneville Works (entry-level lawn care equipment), Greeneville, Tennessee
- John Deere Kernersville (Tracked Hydraulic Excavators), Kernersville, North Carolina

Other important factories:

- John Deere Usine Saran (power systems), Fleury-les-Aubrais, France
- John Deere Argentina (engines, tractors, and combine harvesters), Granadero Baigorria, Santa Fe, Argentina
- John Deere Equipment Pvt Ltd (5000-series tractors), Pune, India
- John Deere Equipment Pvt Ltd (5000-series tractors), Dewas, India
- John Deere Electronic Solutions, Fargo, ND and Pune, India
- John Deere Harvester Works, Sirhind-Fategarh, India
- John Deere Werke Mannheim (6000-series tractors), Mannheim, Germany
- John Deere Brasil: Montenegro, Rio Grande do Sul (tractors), Horizontina - RS (harvesters and planters), Catalão - GO (sugarcane harvesters)
- John Deere Brasil Construction & Forestry (tractors and excavators), Indaiatuba, Brazil
- John Deere Werke Zweibrücken (harvesting equipment), Zweibrücken, Germany
- John Deere Fabriek Horst (pulled and self-propelled agricultural sprayers), Horst, The Netherlands
- John Deere Forestry Oy (forwarders, wheeled harvesters), Joensuu, Finland
- John Deere Reman

== Equipment divisions ==
Name	City/state	Country	Products	Division	Comments
Industrias John Deere Argentina S.A.	Granadero Baigorria, Santa Fe	Argentina	Engines, tractors and combine harvesters	Agriculture	
John Deere Limited Parts Distribution Center	Derrimut, Victoria	Australia		Agriculture	
Auteq Telematica S.A.	São Paulo	Brazil		Agriculture	
John Deere Brazil Ltda. - Unidade Catalão	Catalão (GO)	Brazil		Agriculture	
John Deere Brazil Ltda. - Unidade Horizontina	Horizontina (RS)	Brazil		Agriculture	
John Deere Brazil Ltda. - Unidade Montenegro	Montenegro (RS)	Brazil		Agriculture	
John Deere (Harbin) Agriculture Machinery Co., Ltd.	Jiamusi, Heilongjiang	China		Agriculture	
John Deere (Ningbo) Agriculture Machinery Co., Ltd.	Zhenhai District, Ningbo	China		Agriculture	
John Deere (Tianjin) Agriculture Machinery Co., Ltd.	Tianjin	China		Agriculture	
John Deere Usine d'Arc-les-Gray, France	Gray Cedex	France		Agriculture	
John Deere GmbH & Co. KG	Bruchsal	Germany		Agriculture	
John Deere GmbH & Co. KG	Mannheim	Germany		Agriculture	
Maschinenfabrik Kemper GmbH & Co.KG	Stadtlohn	Germany		Agriculture	
John Deere GmbH & Co. KG	Zweibruecken	Germany		Agriculture	
John Deere Equipment Private Ltd.	Dist. Pune - 412208 Maharashtra	India		Agriculture	
John Deere India Private Limited	Patiala Punjab 147 001	India		Agriculture	
John Deere India Pvt. Ltd.	Dewas (Madhya Pradesh)	India		Agriculture	
John Deere BH Works Ltd	Park Zvaim	Israel		Agriculture	
John Deere Cylinder Internal Platform	Ramos Arizpe, Coah.	Mexico		Agriculture	
Industrias John Deere S.A. de C.V.	Monterrey, N.L.	Mexico		Agriculture	
Industrias John Deere, S.A. de C.V.	Zona Centro, Saltillo, Coah.	Mexico		Agriculture	
John Deere Ramos	Ramos Arizpe, Coah.	Mexico		Agriculture	
John Deere Fabriek Horst B.V.	Horst	Netherlands	Pulled and self-propelled sprayers	Agriculture	
John Deere Domodedovo	Domodedovo	Russia		Agriculture	
John Deere Orenburg	Orenburg	Russia		Agriculture	
John Deere Ibérica, S.	Madrid	Spain		Agriculture	
The Vapormatic Company Ltd.	Exeter	United Kingdom		Agriculture	
NavCom Technology, Inc.	Torrance, CA	United States		Agriculture	
John Deere Cylinder Internal Platform	Moline, IL	United States	Cylinder manufacturing	Agriculture	
John Deere Harvester Works	East Moline, IL	United States	Large combine harvesters	Agriculture	
John Deere Seeding Group	East Moline, IL	United States		Agriculture	
John Deere Des Moines Works	Ankeny, IA	United States	Sprayers, cotton harvesters, and tillage equipment	Agriculture	
John Deere Ottumwa Works	Ottumwa, IA	United States	Baling technology	Agriculture	
John Deere Paton	Paton, IA	United States		Agriculture	
John Deere Intelligent Solutions Group - Urbandale	Urbandale, IA	United States		Agriculture	
John Deere Waterloo Works - Tractor, Cab, and Assembly Operations	Waterloo, IA	United States	6R, 7R, 8R/8RT, and 9R/9RT Series tractors	Agriculture	
John Deere Waterloo Works - Drivetrain Operations	Waterloo, IA	United States	Transmissions, drives, and axle machining and assembly	Agriculture	
John Deere Waterloo Works - Service Parts Operations	Waterloo, IA	United States	Tractor service parts	Agriculture	
John Deere Waterloo Works - Foundry Operations	Waterloo, IA	United States		Agriculture	
John Deere Thibodaux	Thibodaux, LA	United States		Agriculture	
John Deere Seeding Group	Valley City, ND	United States		Agriculture	
Waratah Forestry Equipment Pty. Ltd	Melton, Victoria	Australia		Construction and forestry	
John Deere Brazil Ltda.	Indaiatuba, São Paulo	Brazil		Construction and forestry	
John Deere Brasil Escavadeiras	Indaiatuba, São Paulo	Brazil		Construction and forestry	
John Deere Specialty Products (JDSP) — Langley	Langley, British Columbia	Canada		Construction and forestry	
John Deere Reman — Edmonton	Alberta	Canada		Construction and forestry	
Waratah Forestry Equipment Canada, Ltd.	Kamloops, BC	Canada		Construction and forestry	
John Deere (Tianjin) Company Limited	Tianjin	China		Construction and forestry	
John Deere Forestry — Joensuu, Finland	Joensuu	Finland		Construction and forestry	
Waratah OM Oy	Joensuu	Finland		Construction and forestry	
Ashok Leyland John Deere Construction Equipment Pvt. Ltd.	Tamil Nadu	India		Construction and forestry	
Industrias John Deere S.A. de C.V.	Garza Garcia, Nuevo León	Mexico		Construction and forestry	
Waratah NZ Ltd.	Tokoroa Waikato	New Zealand		Construction and forestry	
John Deere Domodedovo	Moscow	Russia		Construction and forestry	
Bell Equipment Limited	Empangeni	South Africa		Construction and forestry	
Waratah Forestry Attachment, LLC.	Peachtree City, GA	United States		Construction and forestry	
John Deere Construction & Forestry Company	Moline, IL	United States		Construction and forestry	
John Deere Davenport Works	Davenport, Iowa	United States		Construction and forestry	
John Deere Training Center - Davenport	Davenport, Iowa	United States		Construction and forestry	
John Deere Dubuque Works	Dubuque, Iowa	United States		Construction and forestry	
John Deere Reman — Springfield	Springfield, MO	United States		Construction and forestry	
John Deere Kernersville, LLC	Kernersville, NC	United States		Construction and forestry	
Waratah Forestry Attachment, LLC	Kelso, WA	United States		Construction and forestry	
SABO - Maschinenfabrik GmbH	Gummersbach	Germany		Turf	Sold 2020 to Mutares
John Deere Commercial Products	Grovetown, GA	United States		Agriculture	
John Deere Turf Care	Fuquay-Varina, NC	United States	Commercial mowers and Golf equipment	Turf	
John Deere Training Center - Morrisville	Morrisville, NC	United States		Turf	
Transaxle Manufacturing of America Corporation	Rock Hill, SC	United States		Turf	
John Deere Power Products	Greeneville, TN	United States	Riding lawn tractors and zero turn lawn mowers	Turf	
John Deere Horicon Works	Horicon, WI	United States	Gator utility vehicles, riding lawn tractors, walk behind greens mowers, and mower decks	Turf	

== Subsidiaries and affiliates ==
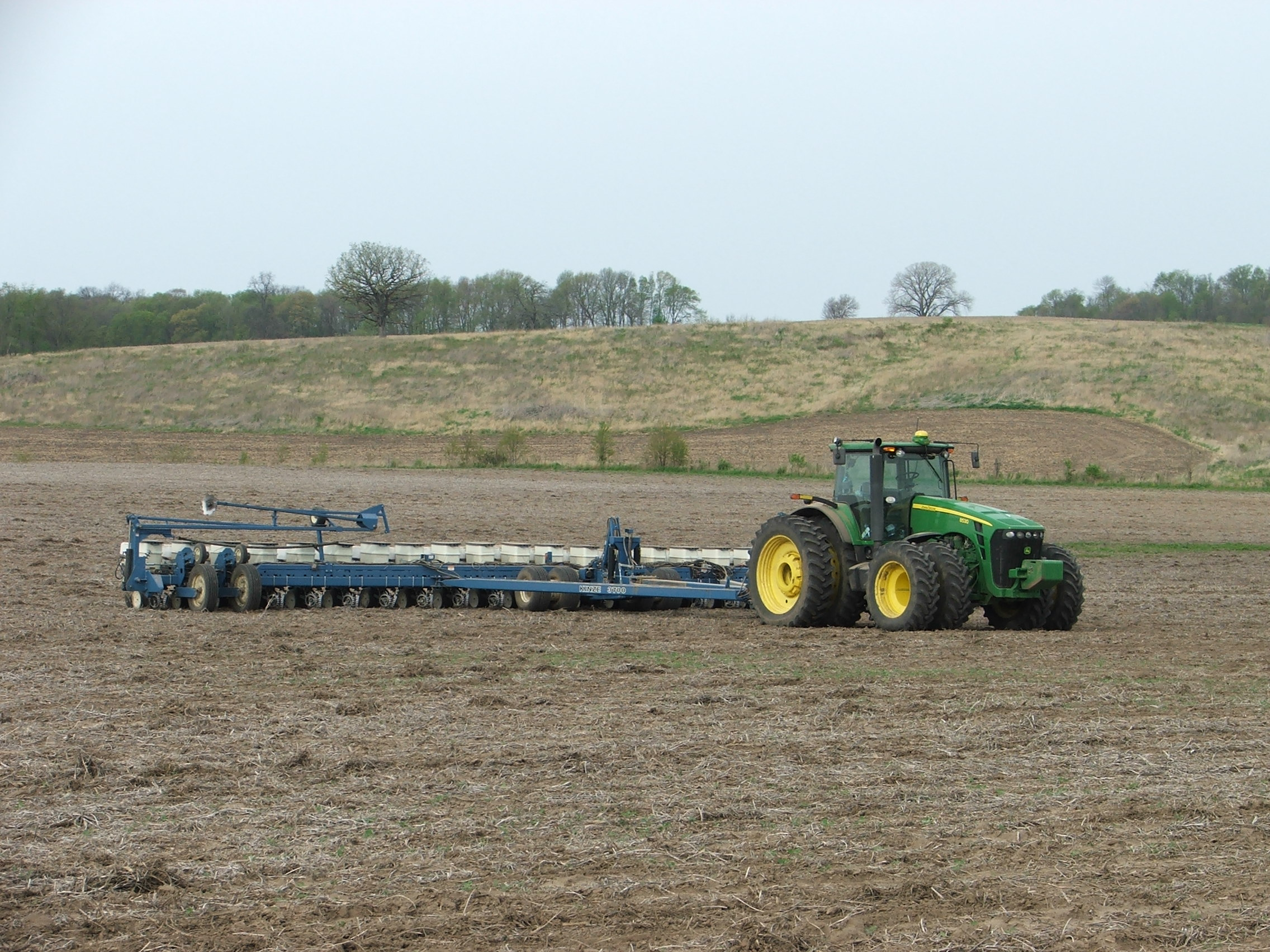
A John Deere 8530 tractor with a Kinze 3700 planter

=== Current ===
- AGRIS Corporation (John Deere Agri Services)
- Bear Flag Robotics – Autonomous agricultural technology & equipment company
- John Deere Ag Management Solutions (intelligent mobile equipment technologies), Urbandale, Iowa
- John Deere Capital Corporation
- John Deere Financial (John Deere Credit and Finance), Johnston, Iowa
- Kemper (row tolerant headers for forage harvesters and combines), Stadtlohn, Germany
- Waratah Forestry Attachments (forestry harvesting heads), Tokoroa, New Zealand
- Agreentech
- NavCom Technology, Inc. (precision positioning systems, see also StarFire), Torrance, California
- John Deere Electronic Solutions (Ruggedized electronics), Fargo, North Dakota
- Ningbo Benye Tractor & Automobile Manufacture Co. Ltd. (low HP tractors), Ningbo, China
- Machinefinder (used equipment division and marketplace)
- John Deere Technology Innovation Center, Research Park, University of Illinois at Urbana-Champaign
- QCFS and Consolidating (attachment distribution center), Davenport, Iowa
- Hagie Sprayers (Upfront Sprayers)
- KingAgro (Sprayers) Argentina
- PLA (sprayers) Argentina
- Wirtgen Group
- Blue River Technology – Pioneer in the use of computer vision and robotics for agriculture bringing crop protection into the digital era with see and spray machines that precisely observe and treat each plant in the field.

=== Former ===
- John Deere Renewables, LLC, a wind energy plant manufacturing arm which represented John Deere's extension into the renewable energy industry – under which it had successfully completed 36 projects in eight US states – was sold to Exelon Energy in August 2010.

== Finances ==
Financial data in $ millions
Year	2005	2006	2007	2008	2009	2010	2011	2012	2013	2014	2015	2016	2017	2018	2019	2020	2021	2022	2023
Revenue	21,191	22,148	24,082	28,438	23,112	26,005	32,013	36,157	37,795	36,067	28,863	26,644	29,738	37,358	39,258	35,540	44,024	52,577	61,251
Net Income	1,447	1,694	1,822	2,053	874	1,864	2,800	3,065	3,537	3,162	1,940	1,524	2,159	2,368	3,253	2,751	5,963	7,130	10,166
Assets	33,637	34,720	38,576	38,735	41,133	43,267	48,207	56,266	59,521	61,336	57,948	57,919	65,786	70,108	73,011	75,091	84,114	90,030	104,087
Employees					51,300	55,700	61,300	66,900	67,000	59,623	57,200	56,800	60,500	74,000	73,500	69,600	75,600	82,200	83,000

Revenue by business unit (2023)
Business	Revenue in billion $	share
Production & Precision Agriculture	26.8	43.7%
Construction and Forestry	14.8	24.2%
Small Agriculture & Turf	14.0	22.8%
Financial Services	4.7	7.7%
Other	1.0	1.6%

Revenue by region (2023)
Region	Revenue in billion $	share
United States	34.1	55.7%
Latin America	8.2	13.4%
Western Europe	7.3	12.0%
Asia, Africa, Oceania, and Middle East	5.2	8.5%
Canada	4.3	7.0%
Central Europe and CIS	2.1	3.5%

== Carbon footprint ==
John Deere reported total CO2e emissions (direct and indirect) for the twelve months ending 30 September 2020 at 766 Kt (−155/−16.8% y-o-y) and plans to reduce emissions 15% by 2022 from a 2017 base year.

John Deere's annual total CO2e emissions - market-based scope 1 + scope 2 (in kilotonnes)
Sep 2018	Sep 2019	Sep 2020
967	921	766

== Sponsorships ==
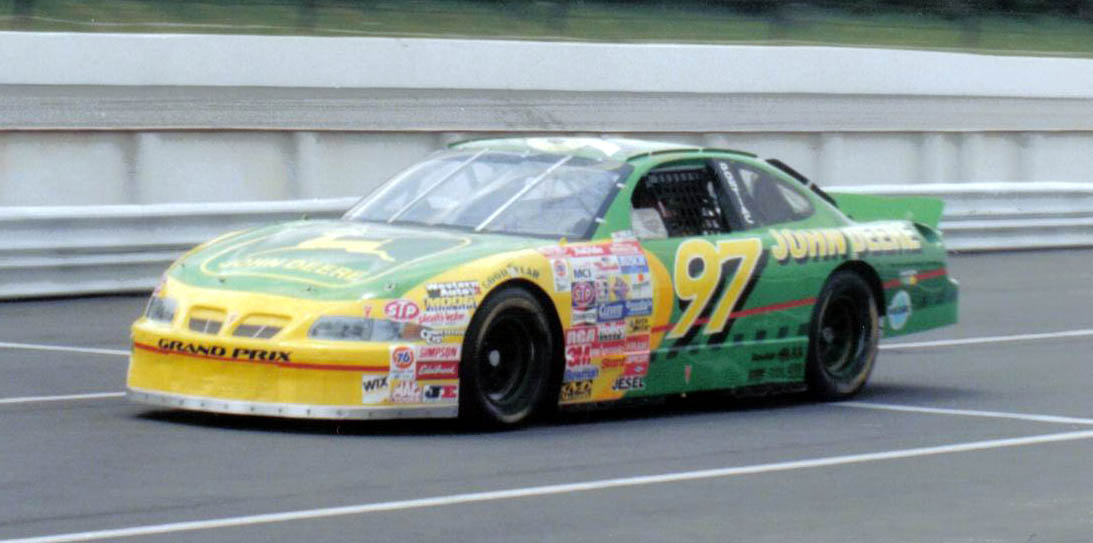
John Deere sponsorship on Chad Little's NASCAR car

- The John Deere Classic is an American professional golf tournament sponsored by the company.
- John Deere sponsored the #23 and #97 cars for NASCAR driver Chad Little in the late 1990s.
- John Deere sponsored the #17 car for NASCAR driver Ricky Stenhouse Jr. in the Monster Energy NASCAR Cup Series in the late 2010s.
- John Deere previously sponsored the Carolina Hurricanes' ice resurfacers from early 2000s to mid 2010s.

== Green Magazine ==
Green Magazine is a publication devoted to John Deere enthusiasts. It was begun in November 1984 by Richard and Carol Hain of Bee, Nebraska.

In early November 1984, the first issue was mailed to 135 paid subscribers. It had 10 black-and-white pages with features on tractors, letters from readers, and advertisements. At the time, the magazine was published bimonthly. It was written in Lincoln, Nebraska, and mailed from the Bee post office.

The magazine grew rapidly, and in 1990, bowing to public demand, it became a monthly. Circulation continued to increase, and currently hovers around 30,000. The magazine now generally contains 88 full-color pages and is perfect bound. It is now printed in Michigan and mailed from several post offices throughout the country.

== Leadership ==
=== President ===
1. John Deere, 1837-1886
2. Charles Henry Deere, 1886–1907
3. William Butterworth, 1907–1928
4. Charles Deere Wiman, 1928–1955
5. William Alexander Hewitt, 1955–1964
6. Robert A. Hanson, 1982–1990
7. Hans Becherer, 1990–2000
8. Robert Lane, 2000–2009
9. Samuel Allen, 2009–2019
10. John C. May, 2020–present

=== Chairman of the Board ===
1. William Butterworth, 1928–1936
2. William Hewitt, 1964–1982
3. Robert A. Hanson, 1982–1990
4. Hans Becherer, 1990–2000
5. Robert Lane, 2000-2009
6. Samuel Allen, 2010–2020
7. John C. May, 2020-present

== See also ==
- John Deere Buck
- John Deere World Headquarters
- List of John Deere tractors
- History of agriculture in the United States § John Deere plows

== Sources and further reading ==
- Broehl, Wayne G. Jr. (1984). John Deere's Company: A History of Deere & Company and Its Times. New York City: Doubleday. ISBN 9780385196642. OCLC 10606276.
- Dahlstrom, Jeremy; Dahlstrom, Neil (2005). The John Deere Story: A Biography of Plowmakers John & Charles Deere. Dekalb, Illinois: Northern Illinois University Press. ISBN 9780875803364. OCLC 56753352.
- Dahlstrom, Neil. Tractor Wars - John Deere, Henry Ford, International Harvester, and the Birth of Modern Agriculture (2022)
- Kendall, Edward C. (1959). John Deere's Steel Plow. Washington, D.C.: Smithsonian Institution. OCLC 3302873.
- Kendall, Edward C. "Contributions from the Museum of History and Technology pt. 2: John Deere's Steel Plow." Bulletin of the United States National Museum (1959). online
- Leffingwell, Randy. The John Deere Century (2018), well illustrated
