= List of International Harvester vehicles =

This is a list of the various vehicles and machines produced by the International Harvester company.

== Cars, SUVs, vans, and pickup trucks ==
=== Cars ===
- Auto Buggy / Auto Wagon 1907–1916

=== Sport-utility vehicles ===
==== Scout ====
- Scout 80 (1960–1965)
  - 80 Camper/Motorhome (only 1 known to have been produced)
  - Red Carpet Series
  - Champagne Series
- Scout 800 (1965–1968)
  - 800 Sportop
  - Champagne Series
- Scout 800A (1969–1971)
  - 800A Aristocrat package
  - 800A SR-2 package
  - 800A Sno-Star package
- Scout 800B (1971)
  - 800B Comanche package
- Scout 810 (1971)
- Scout II (1971–1980)
  - Spirit of '76 edition (1976)
  - Patriot special edition (1976)
  - Selective Edition package (1978–1979)
- Scout Terra (1976–1980)
  - Selective Edition package (1978–1979)
  - Patriot special edition (1976)
- Scout Traveler (1976–1980)
  - The Patriot special edition (1976)
  - Special Limited Edition RS Scout II (1980)
- Scout SSII (Soft-top Safari II) (1977–1979)
  - Shawnee Scout package (only 3-4 produced)
  - Midas SSII
- Scout III SSV concept vehicle (1979)
- Midas Edition (1979–1980)
  - Manufactured by: Midas Van Conversion Co.
    - Family Cruiser/Cruiser
    - Street Machine
    - Off-Road Vehicle
- CVI Edition (1979–1980)
  - Manufactured by: Custom Vehicles Incorporated (associated with Good Times, Inc.)
    - Midnitestar
    - Terrastar
    - Travelstar
    - Shadow
    - Raven
    - GMS (Green Machine Sport)
    - GMS (Gold Medallion Scout)
    - Hot Stuff
    - Trailstar
    - Sportstar

==== Travelall ====
- K-Series panel truck (1940s)
- Travelall L-Series panel truck (1952)
- Travelall R-Series
  - Travelall R-Series, 2-door (1953–1957)
  - Travelall R-Series, 3-door (1956–1960)
  - Travelall R-Series, 4-door (1961–1975)
- Commercial variations (modified by Springfield Equipment Company)
  - Travelall School Bus
  - Travelall Ambulance
  - Travelall Airport Limo

=== Vans ===
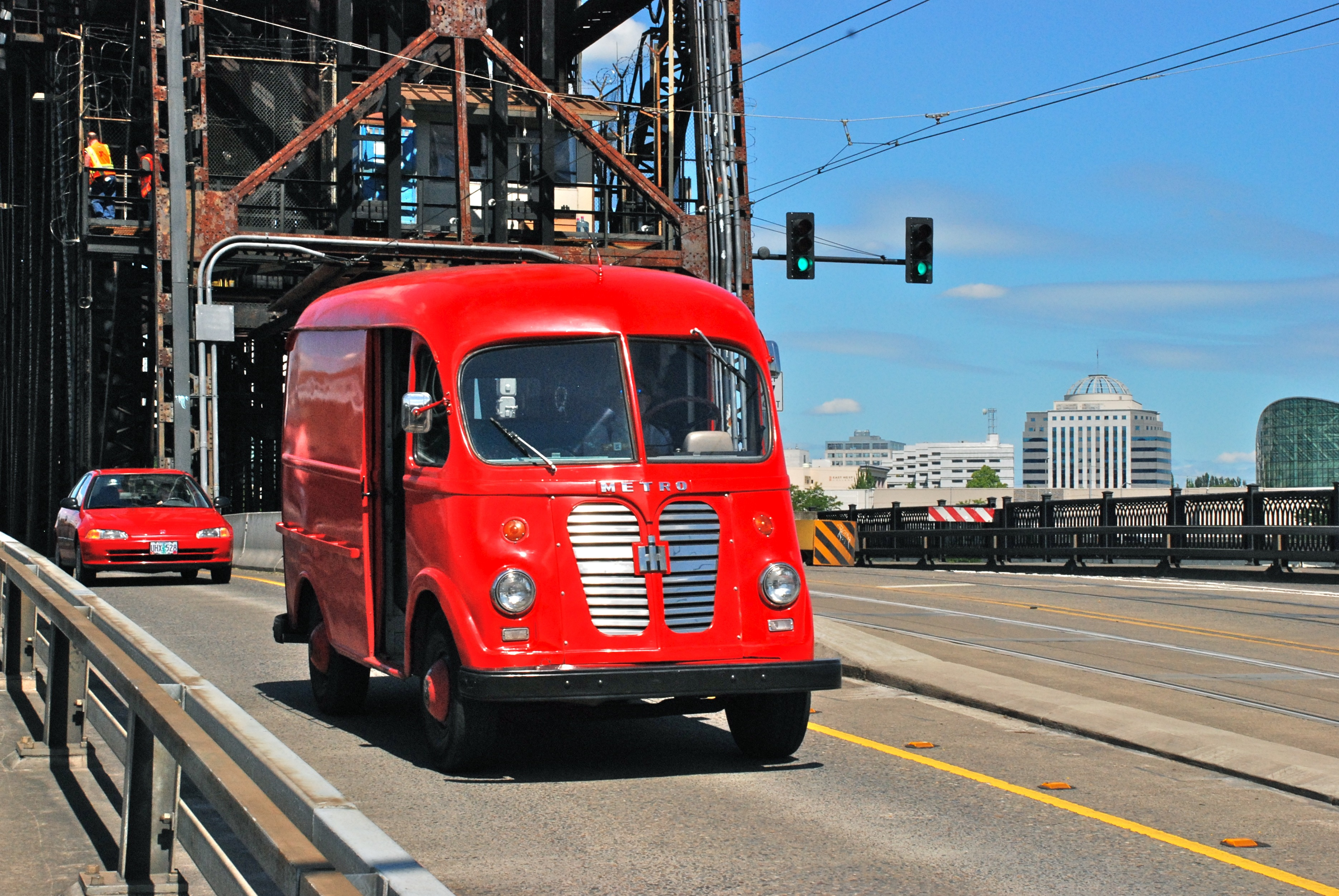
A preserved Metro Van in 2012

- Metro Van (1938–1975)
  - Metro-Lite (1950s)
  - Metro-Mite (1950s)
  - Metro-Multi-Stop (1950s)
  - MetroAluminum-MA1200 (1971)
    - Similar to the GM/Chevy StepVan and GMC ValueVan
    - originally based on the 1937-40 D-Series trucks

=== Pickup trucks ===
- Auto Wagon 1909-?
- Pre-1930s, no official designation
- D-1 (1933; rebadged Willys-Six C-113 with an IHC engine)
- Model C (1934-1936)
- Model D (1937-1940)
- K series (mid 1940-1942 & 1946)
- KB series (1947–1949)
- L series (1950–1952)
- R series (1953–55)
  - S series (1956–1957)
- A series (1957-1958)
  - B series (1958–1961)
- C series (1961–1964)
  - D series (1965)
    - 1000A series (1966)
    - 1000B series (1967)
    - 1000C series (1968)
- Light Line pickup (1969-1975)
  - 1000D series (1969)
  - 1000 series (1970)
  - 1010 series (1971-1973)
  - 100 series (1974), also 200 series
  - 150 series (1975), production ceased April 1975.
  - Travelette (1969-1975)

1076 International Harvester Single axle tilt trailer 10' x 6' K128C3

== Military vehicles ==
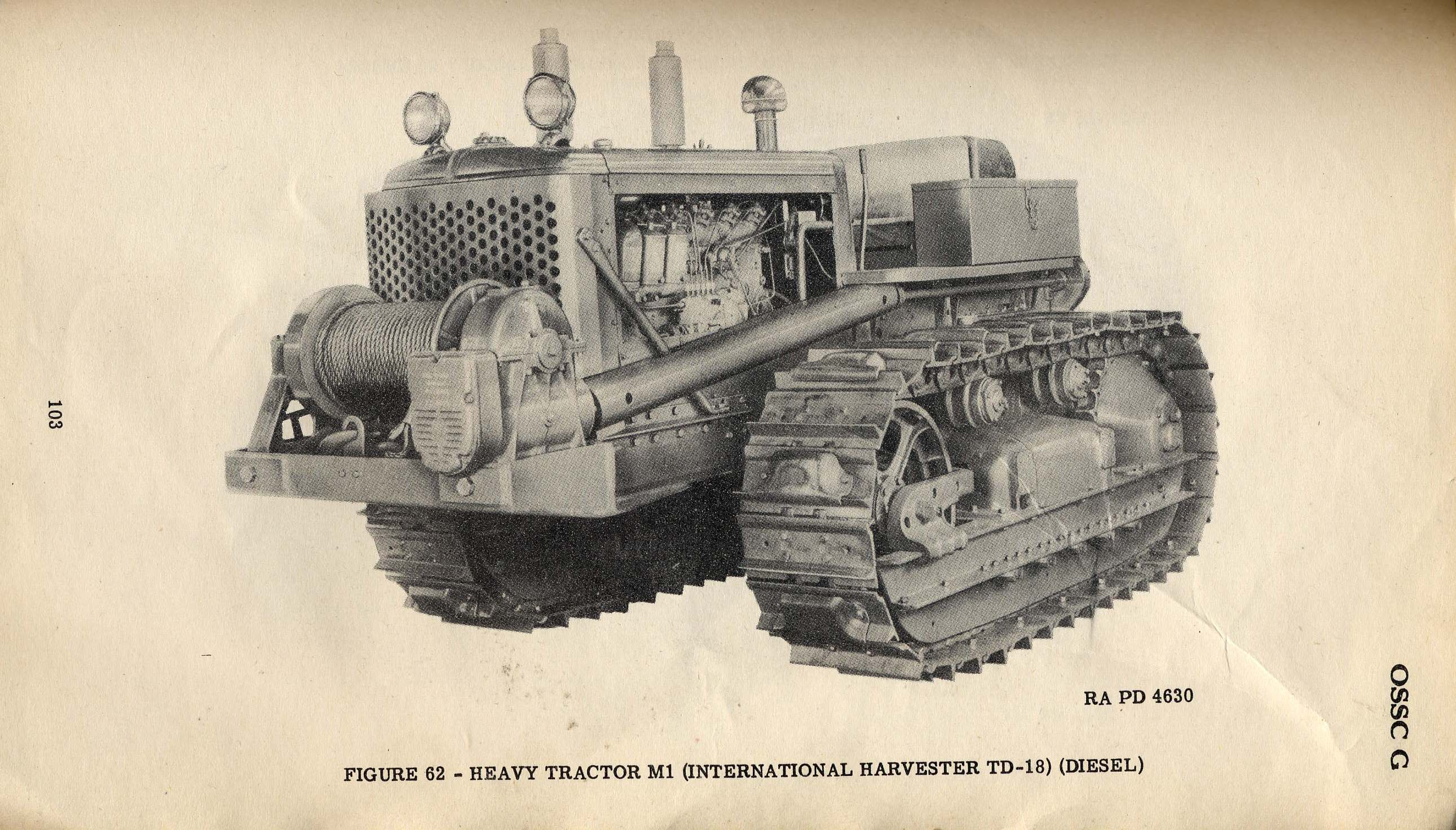
G101 M1 heavy tractor IH

- HEAVY-TRACTOR-M1-IHC-TD-18 M1 heavy tractor, International Harvester model TD18 TM 9-1777A
- M10A 10K Rough Terrain Forklift, Dresser/International model M10A

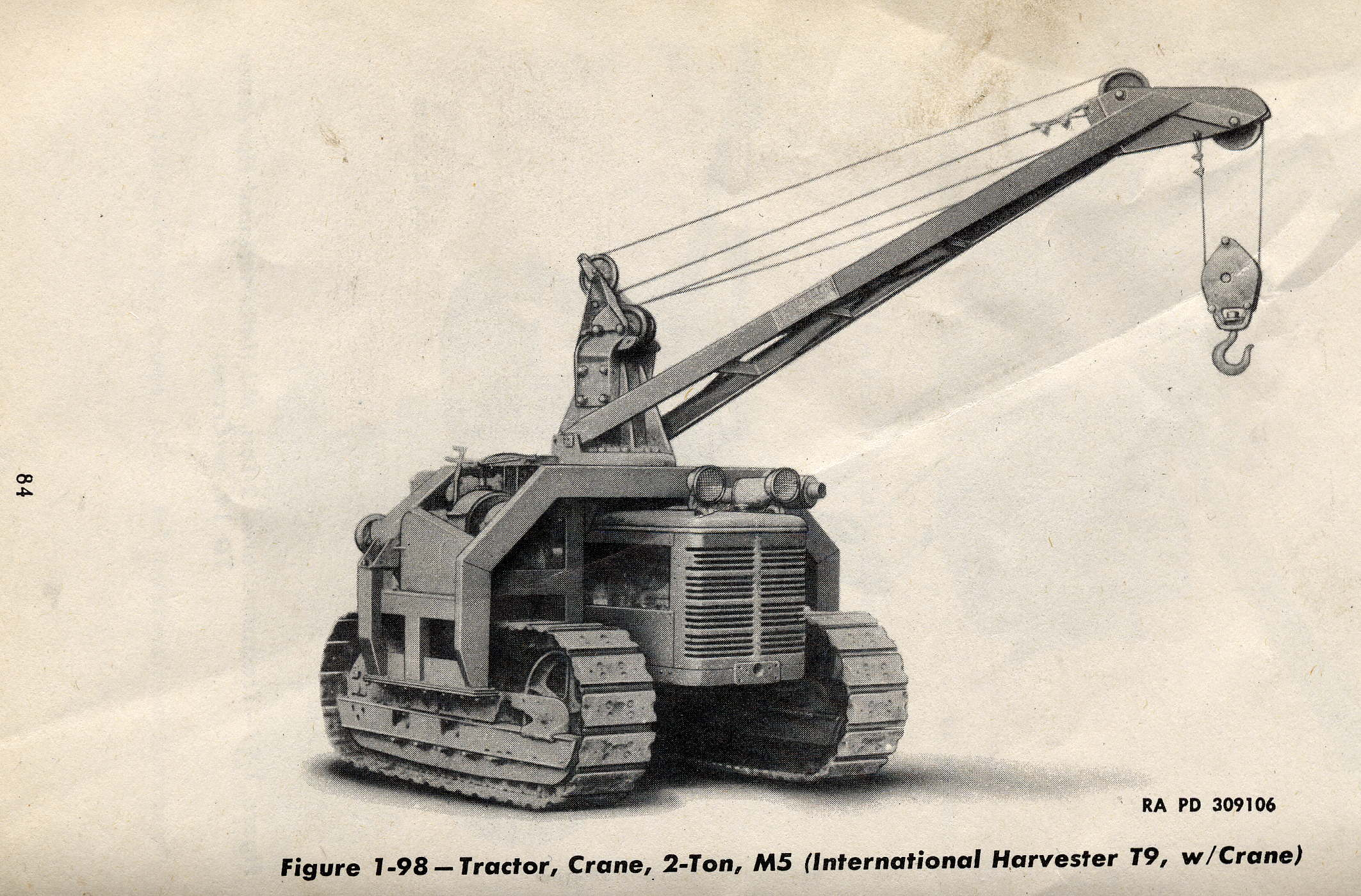
G99 M5 tractor crane IH

- M5 tractor crane, 2-ton, light tractor, TD9
- M3 tractor crane, 2-ton, International Harvester TD14
- M5 tractor – 1942, a tracked artillery tractor
- M5 half-track – 1943, an armored personnel carrier
- M9A1 halftrack, see M2 half-track car
- Dump Truck, 2½-ton, 4X2
- Truck, Cargo, 2½-ton, 4X4 Australian No1. Mk1 (Australian Army Only) Also known as Prototype 1 (P1)
- Truck, Cargo, 2½-ton, 4X4 Australian No1. Mk2 (Australian Army Only) Also known as Prototype 2 (P2)
- Truck, Cargo, 2½-ton, 4X4 Australian No1. Mk3 (Australian Army Only) Used by Australia in Vietnam War
- Truck, Cargo, 2½-ton, 4X4 Australian No1. Mk4 (Australian Army Only)
- Truck, 5-ton, 4X2,
- F1 Truck, Cargo, 5-ton, 6X6 Australian No1. (Australian Army Only) Used by Australia until the late 1980s
- F2 Truck, Dump, 5-ton, 6X6 Australian No1. (Australian Army Only) Used by Australia in Vietnam War
- F5 Truck, Wrecker, 5-ton, 6X6 Australian No1. (Australian Army Only) Used by Australia in Vietnam War
- Truck 5-ton, 4X2, International Harvester
  - M425 Tractor, COE,
  - M426 Tractor, COE,
- 29 passenger bus, 4X2, international Harvester, model K5, KS5
- MXT-MV – 2006, a truck
- Future Tactical Truck System – 2007, a utility vehicle
- MaxxPro – 2007, an armoured fighting vehicle
- APC
- 4000-MV
- 5000-MV
- 7000-MV

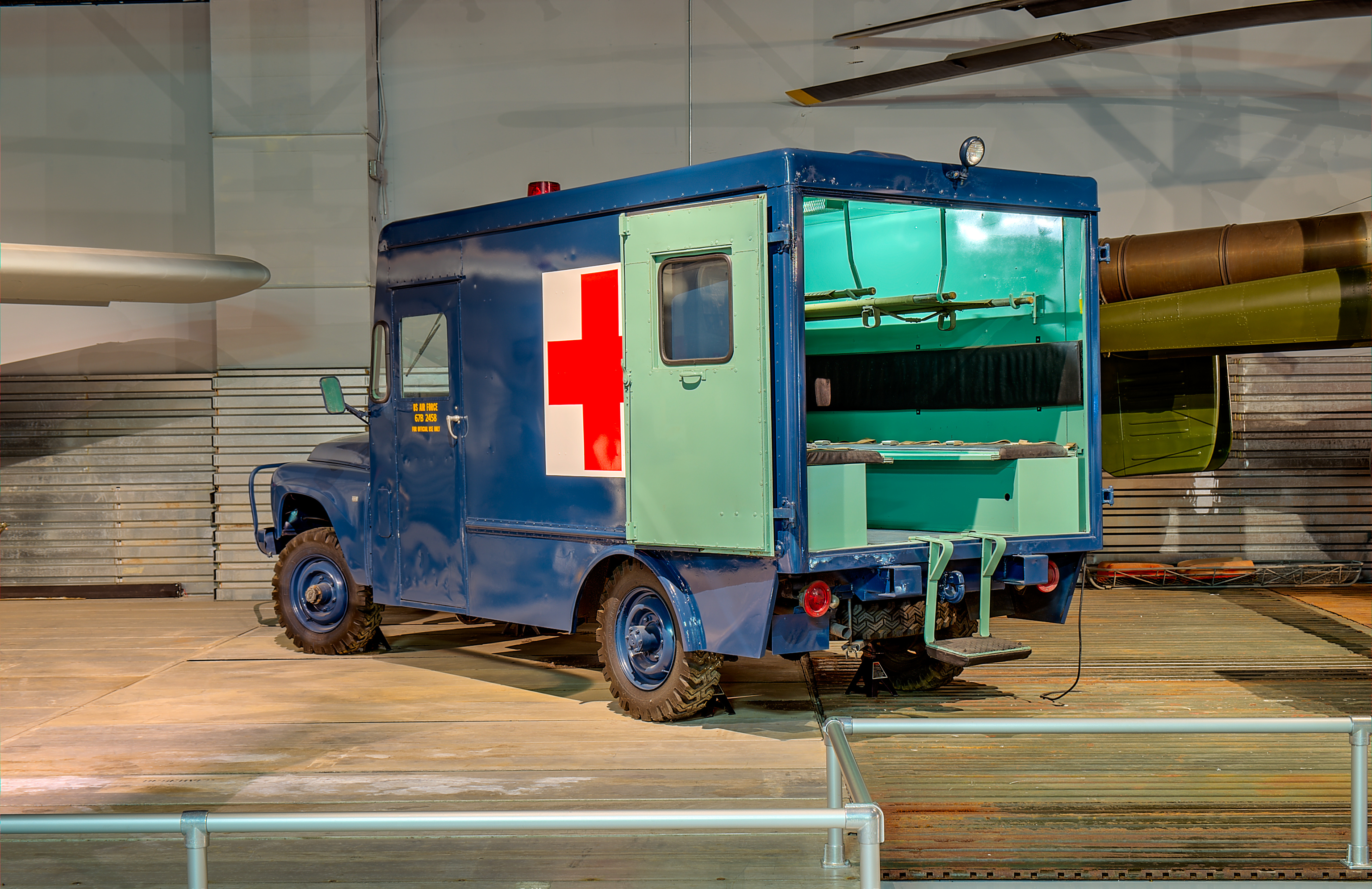
1967 USAF International Harvester Ambulance at the Museum of Aviation

== Transport trucks ==
=== United States ===
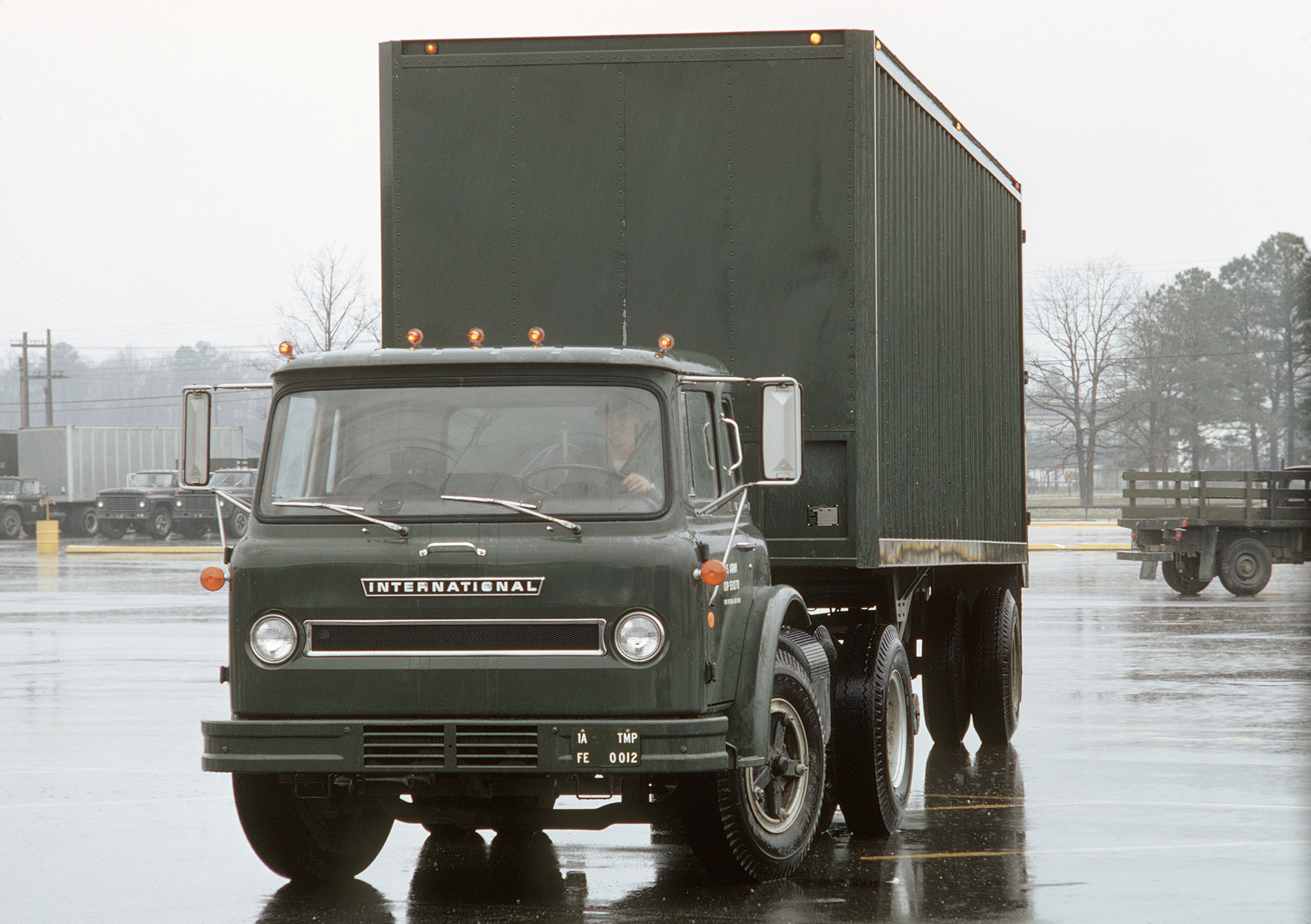
International Harvester Cargostar used by the U.S. Army in 1975.

- Model F 1915–1921, 1Ton
- Model H 1915–1921, .75Ton
- Model L 1915–1921, 4Ton
- Model 21 1921–30, 1Ton through Model 101 5Ton
- Model S 1921–1930, .75Ton through Model SF-46 2Ton
- Model 33 1924–1927, 1.5Ton through Model 103 5Ton
- Model 54 1927–1930, also Model 74 and Model 104
- Six-Speed Special 1928–1930, 1Ton
- Model A 1930-48 Models AW1 through A8, A7 is 7.5Ton
- Model B 1931-? Models B2 and B3
- Cargostar 1970-1981
- Eagle
- Emeryville
- Fleetstar (1962-1977)
- Loadstar (1962–1979)
  - Loadstar trucks were also assembled in Doncaster (Carr Hill Works) in the mid/late 1960s
- Johnny Reb (1971 - limited regional edition to the Southeastern United States)
- B-Series
- BC-Series
- C-Series
- ID-Series
- L-Series (1950–1952)
- R-Series (1953–1957)(R-100 - R-205)
  - S-Series (1955–1961)(S-100 - S-180)
- Paystar (1972–2016)
  - 5050/5070 (1972-c.1990)
  - 5500/5600 (1990-???)
  - 5900 (???-2016)
- S-Series/4000-Series (1978–2001)
  - S-series (1977-early 1989)
    - 1600/1700/1800/1900 (1978-early 1989)
    - 2100/2200/2300 (1977-early 1989)
    - 2500/2600 (1978-2003)
    - S-Series "Schoolmaster" (1978-early 1989)
      - 1853FC (1979-1989)
  - 4000 series (early 1989–2001)
    - 4500/4600 (1989-1994)
    - 4700/4800/4900 (1989-2001)
    - 3800 (early 1989–2004)
      - 3600 (1991-1998)
    - 3900FC (1990-2010)
    - 3000 (1996–present)
  - 8000 series (1989-2001)
    - 7100/8100/8200 (1989-2001)
    - 8300 (1990-2001)
- Transtar II
- V220
- VCOF
- 9000 Series (1971-2017)
  - Transtar 4200/4300 (1971-1985)
  - International 9000 series (1985-1999)
    - 9370/9300 (1985-1998)
    - 9400 (1990-1999)
    - 9200 (1993-1999)
    - 9100 (1997-1999)
  - International 9000i series (2000-2017)
    - 9100i (2000-2002)
    - 9200i (2000-2011)
    - 9400i (2000-2007)
    - 9900i (2000-c.2017)
    - 9900ix Eagle (2000-2017)
- 9000 (COE) (1981-1998)
  - CO9670/9600 (1981-1998)
  - 9700/9800 (1989-1998)
  - 9800i (1998-c.2017; outside North America)

=== Australia ===
- AACO (1961-1970) AACO-Australian A-line Cab Over.
- ACCO (1963-2022 formerly manufactured by Iveco) ACCO-Australian C-line Cab Over.

== Tractors ==
=== Early models ===
- Type A (1907–1911)
- Type B
- Type C Mogul (1909–1914)
- Type D Titan (1910–1917)
- Titan 10–20,(1915–1922)
- Mogul 10–20,(1916–1919)
- Mogul Junior
- Mogul 8-16 (1914–1916)
- McCormick-Deering 15-30/22-36 (1921–34)
- McCormick-Deering 10-20 (1923–1939)
- International 8-16 (1917–1922)
- McCormick-Deering W-12 (1934–1938)
- McCormick-Deering W-14 (1938–1939)
- McCormick-Deering W-30 (1932–1940)
- McCormick-Deering W-40, WD-40 (1935–1940)

=== Farmall F and Letter Series (1924–1954) ===
- F-12, Fairway 12, F-14, Fairway 14
- Regular, Fairway
- F-20
- F-30
- A, Super A, Super A1
- B, BN
- C, Super C, Super FC
- Cub, Super Cub (Super Cub was made in France only), Cub Lo-Boy
- H, HV, Super H, Super HV
- M, MV, MD, MDV, Super M, Super MV, Super MD, Super MDV Super M-TA, Super MV-TA, Super MD-TA, Super MDV-TA
- Super BM, Super BMD (These models were made in Britain, hence the 'B' designation)

=== Standard Series (1940–1954) ===
- McCormick-Deering W-4, I-4, O-4, OS-4
- McCormick-Deering W-6, WD-6
- McCormick-Deering W-9, WD-9
- McCormick Super W-4, Super I-4, Super O-4
- McCormick Super W-6, Super WD-6
- McCormick Super W-6TA, Super WD-6TA
- McCormick Super W-9, Super WD-9

=== Australian models ===
- McCormick International AW-6 (Kero, wide front)
- McCormick International Super AW-6 (Kero, wide front)
- McCormick International Super AWD-6 (Diesel, wide front)
- AM (Kero, wide front)
- Farmall Super AM (Kero, row crop)
- Farmall Super AMD (Diesel, row crop)
- Farmall AM-7 (Kero, row cop)
- Farmall AMD-7 (Diesel, row crop)
- McCormick International AW-7 (Kero, wide front)
- McCormick International AWD-7 (Diesel, wide front)
- McCormick International AOS-6 (Kero, wide front orchard tractor)
- McCormick International A514
- McCormick International A554 (Kero, wide front)
- McCormick International A554 (Diesel, wide front)
- Farmall A554 (Diesel, row crop)
- McCormick International A564 (Diesel, wide front)
- Farmall A564 (Diesel, row crop)

==== US Models also manufactured in Australia ====
- Farmall M (Kero)

==== UK Models also manufactured in Australia ====
- McCormick International A414

==== UK Models, grouped by upgrade (1949–1985) ====
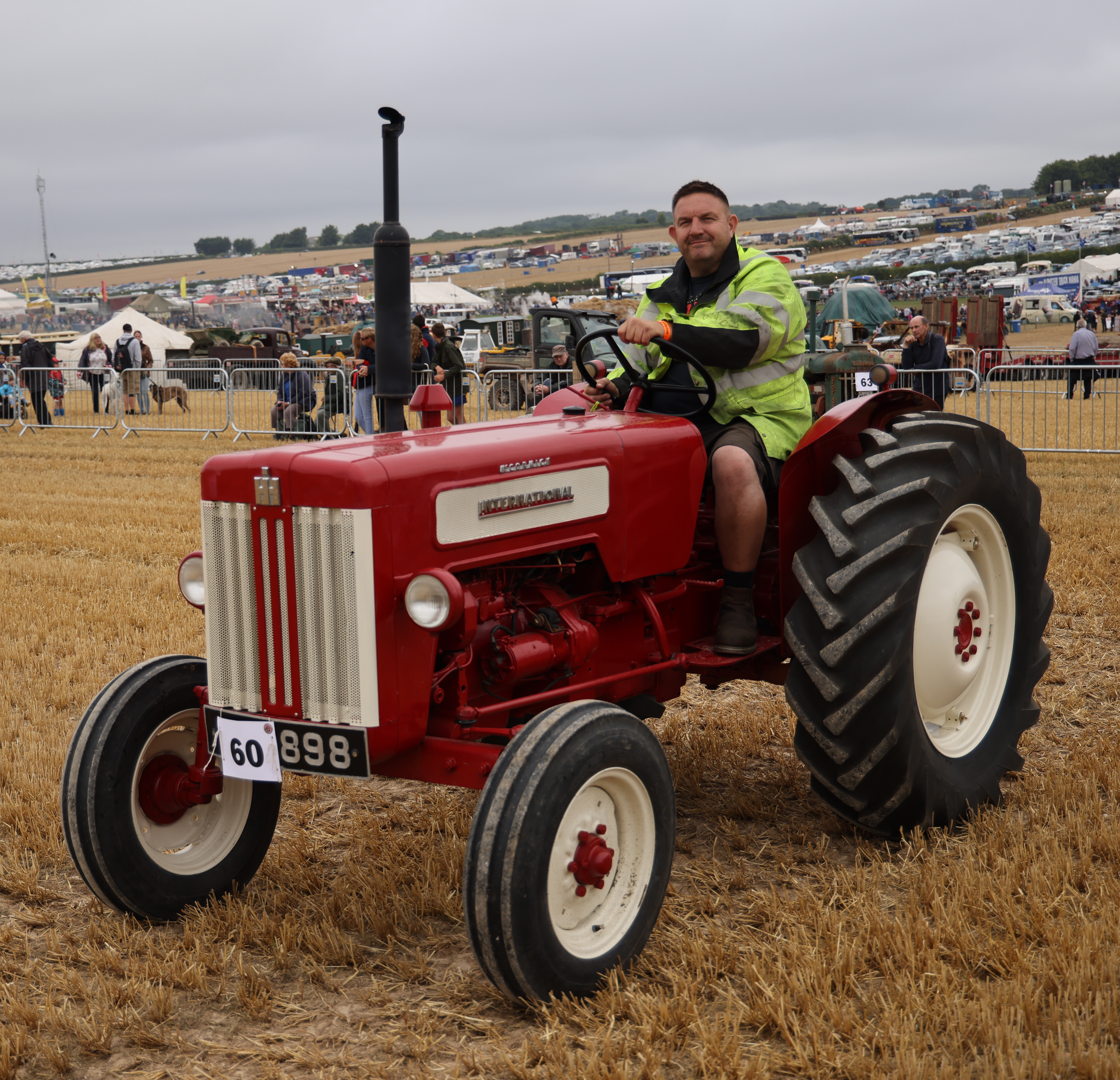
A 1963 McCormick International B414

Built in the Idle works at Bradford from approx 1954 to 1981? (Idle had previously built Jowett cars and vans)

- B250 With the BD144 Engine (Diesel) BC144 (Petrol)
  - B275
    - B276
      - 354
- McCormick International B414 BD154 (Diesel) BC144 (Petrol)
  - McCormick International 434
    - 374

Models built at Doncaster between 1949 and 1985

- B450 / B450 Farmall / B450 4WD Roadless Traction front axle (smaller front wheels)_
- B614
  - B634/B634 4WD (Roadless)/ B-634 County (Equal wheel 4WD)
- 454(D179 3 cyl eng)/474(D206 4 cyl)/475 (Perkins eng)/574(D239 4 cyl eng)/674(D239 4 cyl eng) - all 2 wheel drive except for approx 25 built in 1977 with Kimco axle. Trans options - Torque Amplifier. Hydrostatic Drive offered on 454/574 models. First Doncaster tractors offered with factory fitted cabs. Later cab versions were isomounted to reduce noise. No heater available.

Industrial version of 454 was 2400 & 574 was 2500 (painted yellow with outboard drum handbrakes). Industrial trans option was Hydraulic Forward/Reverse or Hydro.

  - 484(D179)/584(D206)/684(D239)/784(D239)/884(D268) - available as 2 or 4 wheel drive (Kimco front axle). Gear drive with TA option. Hydro option on some models.

Industrial versions were 248/258/268/278/288. Gear drive or Hyd Fwd/rev trans except 268 which was hydrostatic drive. Roof option with heater made available (made by Sekura). Trans option TA. 684 Later Ag tractors were offered with "Super Deluxe Cab" made by Sekura.

    - 485/585/685/785/885 offered with choice of XL cab or the old style cab with revamped "H pattern" gearshift. Gear drive with a Torque Amplifier as an option. 4wd option utilising ZF side drive front axle. 685 could be specified with Hydro transmission.

Industrial models kept the 248/258/268/278/288 model numbers but had "H pattern gearshift".

IH Doncaster supplied transmissions to the USA (initially Louisville) which were built into tractors with the same model designations as the Doncaster produced tractors. Also some were specifically for US only models (240/250/260/270?). Some had torque converter transmissions. They also supplied transmissions to Kimco in Japan (joint venture IH/Komatsu) who built them into tractors and designed their own four wheel drive axle. This axle was later imported and fitted mainly to 84 series tractors by Doncaster. Designed for traction in paddy field use it proved not to be robust enough to carry the weight when front loaders were fitted. IH Doncaster also supplied transmissions for the Volvo BM T500, 2200, 2204, 2250 and 2254 tractors. Balers were assembled in Liverpool, but this was transferred to Carr Hill Works in Doncaster models were: B46/B47/430/440/435/445. Carr Hill also assembled Lodestar trucks in the mid/late 1960s. The Wheatley Hall Road factory also produced agricultural crawler tractors BTD5/BTD6/BTD8/BTD20 in red as well as yellow CE bulldozer and loader versions. Wheatley also produced backhoe loaders (3400/3500/260) and Payloaders H25/500 Payloader/H30/H50 & H65.

=== French models ===
- Super FC
  - Farmall Super FC-N
  - Farmall Super FC-E
  - Farmall Super FC-D
- Farmall F-235
  - Farmall F-237
  - Farmall F-270
- Farmall F-135D
- Farmall F-335D (French diesel F-350)
- Farmall F-265
  - Farmall F-267
  - Farmall F-240

=== German models ===
- McCormick F-12-G
  - McCormick FS
  - McCormick FG
  - McCormick HS
  - McCormick HG
  - McCormick FGD2
- McCormick DLD2
- McCormick DED3
- McCormick DGD4
- McCormick D-212
  - McCormick D-214
- McCormick Farmall D-217
  - McCormick Standard D-217
- McCormick D-320
- McCormick D-436

McCormick D-440

=== German and French models ===
- McCormick International 323-453
  - McCormick International 523-824
    - International 323-453
- International 553-824
  - International 734-834
    - International 946-1246
- International 433-833
  - International 554-844
    - International 955-1455
- International 743-856 XL
  - International 955-1455 XL
    - International 956-1056 XL

=== Hundred series and follow-ons, grouped by upgrade (1955–1971) ===
In this timeframe, all Farmall models are row-crop tractors, all International models are utility tractors. Both Farmall and International models had hi-crop (or high-clear) versions. International models also had industrial and orchard options.

- Farmall 100
  - Farmall 130
    - Farmall 140
- Farmall 200
  - Farmall 230
    - Farmall 240
- Farmall 300, McCormick 300 (utility)
  - Farmall 350, International 350 (Gas, Lp gas, Diesel)
    - Farmall 460, International 460 (Gas, Lp gas, Diesel)
- Farmall 400 (Gas, Lp gas, Diesel)
  - Farmall 450(Gas, Lp gas, Diesel)
    - Farmall 560 (Gas, Lp gas, Diesel)
- McCormick 230 (utility)
- International 330
- Farmall 340, International 340
- McCormick-Deering 600 (wheatland only)
  - McCormick 650 (wheatland only)
    - International 660 (wheatland only)
- Farmall 404, International 404
  - International 414
    - International 424, 2424 Industrial
- Farmall 504, International 504, 2504 Industrial

=== 06 series ===
1963–1967

- International 606
- Farmall 706
- Farmall 806
- Farmall 1206,1965

=== 56 series 1967–1971 ===
- International 434 Utility
- International 444 Utility, 2444 Industrial
- Farmall 544
- International 544 Utility, 2544 Industrial
- Farmall 656
- Farmall 756
- Farmall 826 (1969)
- Farmall 856
- Farmall 1026
- Farmall 1256
- Farmall 1456 (1969)

=== International (1974–1985) ===
The Farmall brand was discontinued in 1973, all IH tractors after this date are International. IH made their 5 millionth tractor in 1974 which was a 1066.

==== 66-series tractors ====
===== 2-wheel-drive tractors =====
1971–1976

- 666 hydro made until 1973
- 666
- Hydro 70 replaces the 666 hydro, 1973
- 766
- 966 Hydro, until 1973
- Hydro 100 replaces 966 and 1066 hydros in 1973
- 1066 hydro
- 1066
- 1466
- 1468
- 1566 introduced in 1974
- 1568 v8 tractor, only 862 built

All models had a blackstripe paint scheme in 1976

===== 4-wheel-drive tractors =====
- 4166
- 4366
- 4568

==== 86-series tractors ====
===== 2-wheel drive tractors =====
1976–1981

- 686
- Hydro 86
- 786 introduced in 1980
- 886
- 986
- Hydro 186
- 1086 Tri-stripe last year of production,1981
- 1486 came in tri-stripe the last production year,1981
- 1586 planetary gear drive

===== 4-wheel drive tractors =====
- 4186
- 4386
- 4586
- 4786

==== 2+2 tractors ====
Generation 1 1978–1981

- 3388
- 3588
- 3788

Generation 2 1981–1985

- 6388
- 6588
- 6788
- 7088 (never released)
- 7288
- 7488
- 7688 (never released)
- 7888 (never released)

=== Utility tractors ===
==== 04 Series ====
- 2404 Industrial series and utility series
- 2504

==== 24 series ====
- 2424
- 2524

==== 44 series ====
- 2444
- 2544

==== 54 series ====
- 354
- 454
- 2454
- 2554

==== 64 series ====
- 364
- 464
- 664

==== 74 series ====
- 374
- 474, 2400 Industrial
- 574, 2500 Industrial
- 674

==== 84 series ====
- 184
- 284
- 274 offset
- 384
- 484, 2400B Industrial
- 584, 2500B Industrial
- 684
- Hydro 84
- 784
- 884

=== End of an era ===
==== 30 series ====
1981–1985

- 3088
- 3288
- 3488 Hydro (only 465 made)
- 3688

Optional pressurised cab all models.

==== 50 series ====
1981–1985

- 5088
- 5288
- 5488

All 50 series came standard with cab heat and air, also a variety of radio options. FWA is also an option.

70 series 4-wheel drive

1982–1984

- 7388
- 7588
- 7788

==== Super 70 Series (2+2) ====
May 1985 to November 1985

- 7088 (never released)
- 7288
- 7488
- 7688 (never released)
- 7888 (never released)

The Super 70 Series 2+2 line came with Command Center Cab, 50 Series partial-powershift 18 speed transmission, center drive shaft to transfer case, heavier front axle, 50 Series-style grille and decals.

== Heavy equipment ==
=== Crawler tractors ===
T models gas TD models diesel

- TA-40
- TK-40
- TD-40
- T-6
- TD-6
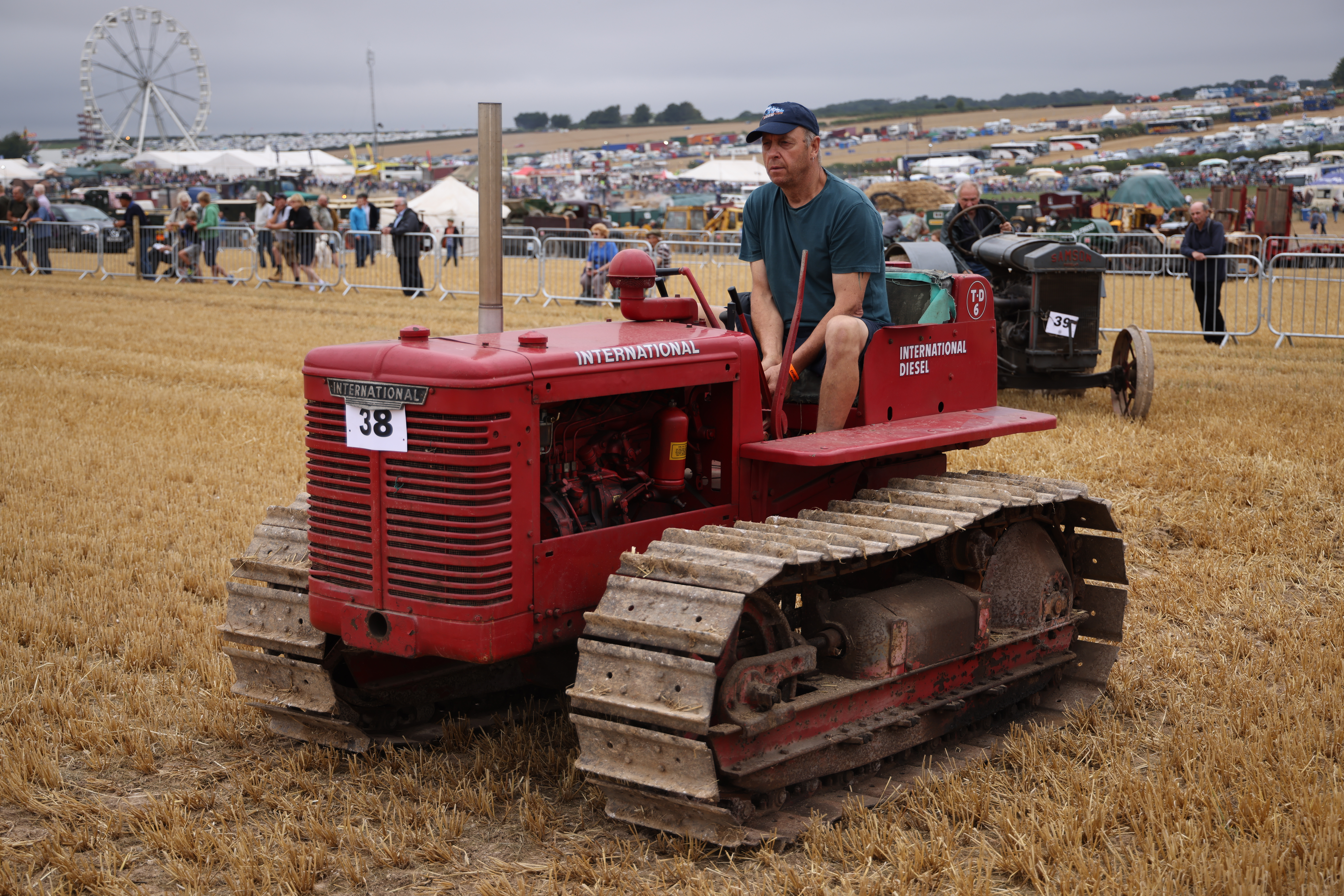
  A TD6
- TD-6-61
- TD-6-62
- T-9
- TD-7
- TD-8
- TD-9
- TD-9-91
- TD-9-92
- TD-9B
- TD-12
- TD-14
- T-14
- TD-14A
- TD-14-141
- TD-14-142
- TD-15
- TD-15-150
- TD-15-151
- TD-15B
- TD-15C
- TD-18
- TD-18A
- TD-18-181
- TD-18-182
- T-20
- TD-20B
- TD-20C
- TD-20E
- TD-24
- TD-25
- TD-25B
- TD-25C
- TD-25E
- TD-30
- T-35
- T-4
- T-340
- TD-340
- T-5
- TD-5
- TDC-5
- 500
- 500-C
- 500-E
- 175
- 175B
- L250C

=== Excavators ===
- 3960
- 3964
- 3984
- 3984 series B
- 630
- 640
- 650

=== Forklifts ===
- International Harvester Model UB240
- U.S. Army International Harvester M10A 10K rough terrain forklift
- International 4500A gas forklift.

=== Loaders, skid steer ===
The following were marketed as Hustler Compact Loaders:

- 4120
- 4130
- 4135
- 4140
- 4150
- 3200A w/VH4D Wisconsin engine 1972–1973
- 3200A w/VG4D Wisconsin engine 1973- MAY 1974
- 3200B w/Wisconsin VG4D engine 1974–1978
- Hough 30A
- Hough 30B
- Hough 510
- Hough 515
- Hough 520
- Hough 530
- Hough 540
- Hough 90
- Hough 540
- Hough 100
- Hough 550
- Hough 560AM
- Hough 560B
- Hough 570
- Hough 580

=== Payscrapers ===
- 431 single engine open bowl
- 433 twin engine open bowl
- 442 single engine elevating
- 444 twin engine elevating

=== Payskidders ===
- S-8
- S-9

=== Payhauler ===
- Payhauler
