= Farmall 60 series tractors =

Row crop tractor

Farmall 460
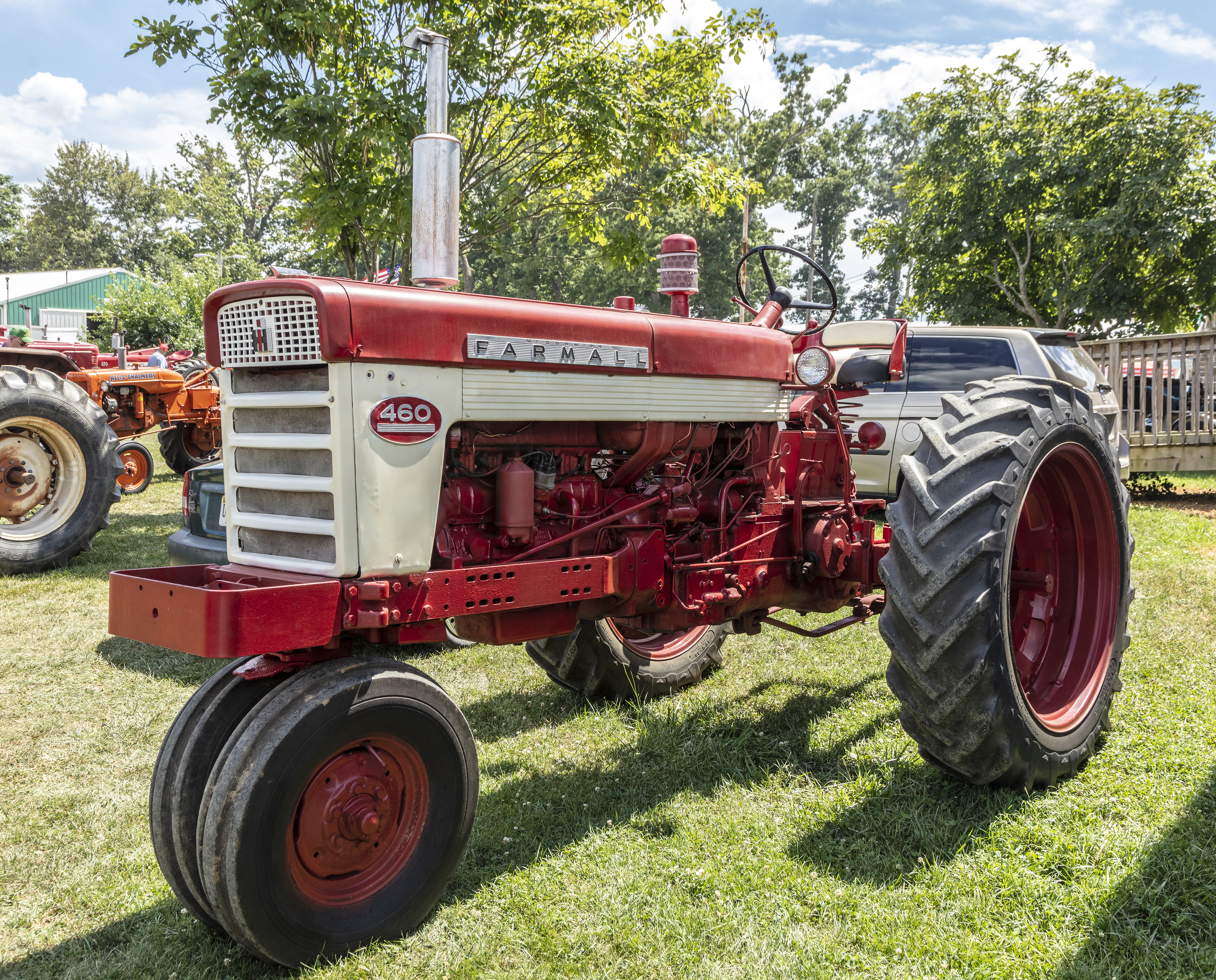
- Farmall 460
- Type: Row-crop agricultural tractor
- Manufacturer: International Harvester
- Production: 1958-1963
- Length: 140 inches (360 cm)
- Width: 83.5 inches (212 cm) (minimum) to 105 inches (270 cm) (maximum)
- Height: 78 inches (200 cm) (to steering wheel)
- Weight: 5,835 pounds (2,647 kg) (gasoline), 6,055 pounds (2,747 kg) (diesel)
- Propulsion: Rear wheels
- Engine model: International Harvester C221 (gasoline and LP), International Harvester D236 (diesel)
- Gross power: 55 horsepower (41 kW)
- PTO power: 49.47 horsepower (36.89 kW) (belt)
- Drawbar power: 35.96 horsepower (26.82 kW)
- Drawbar pull: 6,903 pounds (3,131 kg) (LP), 6,846 pounds (3,105 kg) (diesel)
- NTTL test: 670
- Preceded by: Farmall 350

The Farmall 60 series tractors are general-purpose row-crop tractors that replaced the larger models of the Farmall letter series beginning in 1958. Produced from 1958 to 1963, the Farmall 460 and 560 tractors represented a modernization of the Farmall H and Farmall M respectively, with higher-horsepower 6-cylinder engines in a restyled body. The heavy general-purpose 660 was sold under the International brand, and was a successor to the McCormick-Deering W series tractors.

== Description ==
The new styling abandoned the Raymond Loewy styling of the letter series in favor of a squared-off look that was retained until the end of the Farmall product run. The new tractors could be adapted to operate on gasoline, kerosene, LP gas, and distillate fuels, and a diesel engine option was offered for each. The larger engines were combined with the essentially unaltered powertrain of the earlier models, producing immediate problems with reliability, particularly with the 560, resulting in a public relations problem for International Harvester, and requiring replacement with new, redesigned powertrain components as part of a massive recall effort. All models had improved hydraulic systems and were more comfortable to operate than their predecessors.

== Farmall 460 ==
The Farmall 460 is a row crop tractor produced from 1958 to 1963. Successor to the Farmall 350 series, it was part of the line of medium tractors originating with the Farmall H. Like the 350, it was rated for three plows, but the 460 had a larger six-cylinder 55-horsepower (41 kW) gasoline or liquid petroleum gas engine with a displacement of 221 cubic inches (3,620 cubic centimetres), powering a five forward gear and one reverse gear torque amplifier transmission, with an optional 10-speed transmission. A 236-cubic-inch (3,870-cubic-centimetre) diesel version was also offered. Variants included the IH 460 utility tractor, and a highboy model called the 460 Hi-Clear. The IH 460 Wheatland was offered for non-row-crop farming. Both an IH 460 orchard version and a lowered IH 460 grove version were offered for fruit and citrus growers. About 35,000 460s were produced, about $4,700 for gasoline to $5,400 for diesel-engined versions.

== Farmall 560 ==
Farmall 560
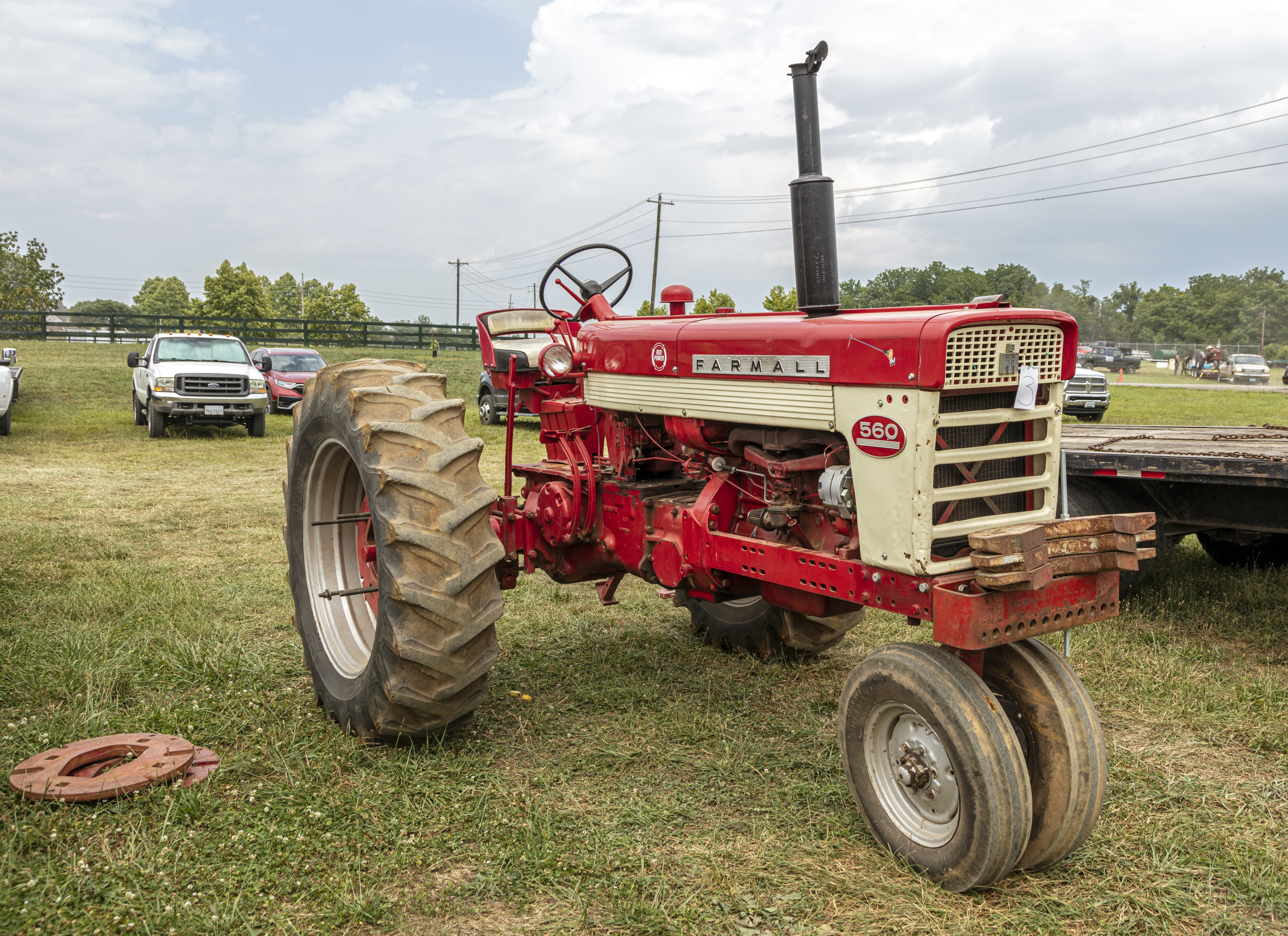
- Farmall 560
- Type: Row-crop agricultural tractor
- Manufacturer: International Harvester
- Production: 1958-1963
- Length: 141 inches (360 cm)
- Width: 85 inches (220 cm) (minimum) to 107 inches (270 cm) (maximum)
- Height: 88 inches (220 cm) (to steering wheel)
- Weight: 6,563 pounds (2,977 kg) (gasoline), 6,785 pounds (3,078 kg) (diesel)
- Propulsion: Rear wheels
- Engine model: International Harvester C263 (gasoline and LP), International Harvester D282 (diesel)
- Gross power: 66 horsepower (49 kW)
- PTO power: 59.48 horsepower (44.35 kW)
- Drawbar power: 53.12 horsepower (39.61 kW)
- Drawbar pull: 7,347 pounds (3,333 kg) (LP), 7,588 pounds (3,442 kg) (diesel)
- NTTL test: 669
- Preceded by: Farmall 450

The Farmall 560 is a five-plow row crop tractor produced from 1958 to 1963. Successor to the Farmall 450 series, it was part of the line of large tractors originating with the Farmall M. The updated tractors marked an attempt by Farmall to respond to increased competition from other tractor manufacturers that were introducing more modern tractors with greater power. The 560 and the smaller Farmall 460 were restyled and had new engines. Other components carried over from earlier lines caused reliability problems, harming International Harvester's reputation and market position.

The 560 was rated for five plows, using six-cylinder 66-horsepower (49 kW) gasoline or liquid petroleum gas engine with a displacement of 263 cubic inches (4,310 cubic centimetres), powering a five forward gear and one reverse sliding gear torque amplifier transmission, with an optional 10-speed transmission. A 282-cubic-inch (4,620-cubic-centimetre) diesel version was also offered. Variants included the IH 560 utility tractor, and a highboy model called the 560 Hi-Clear.

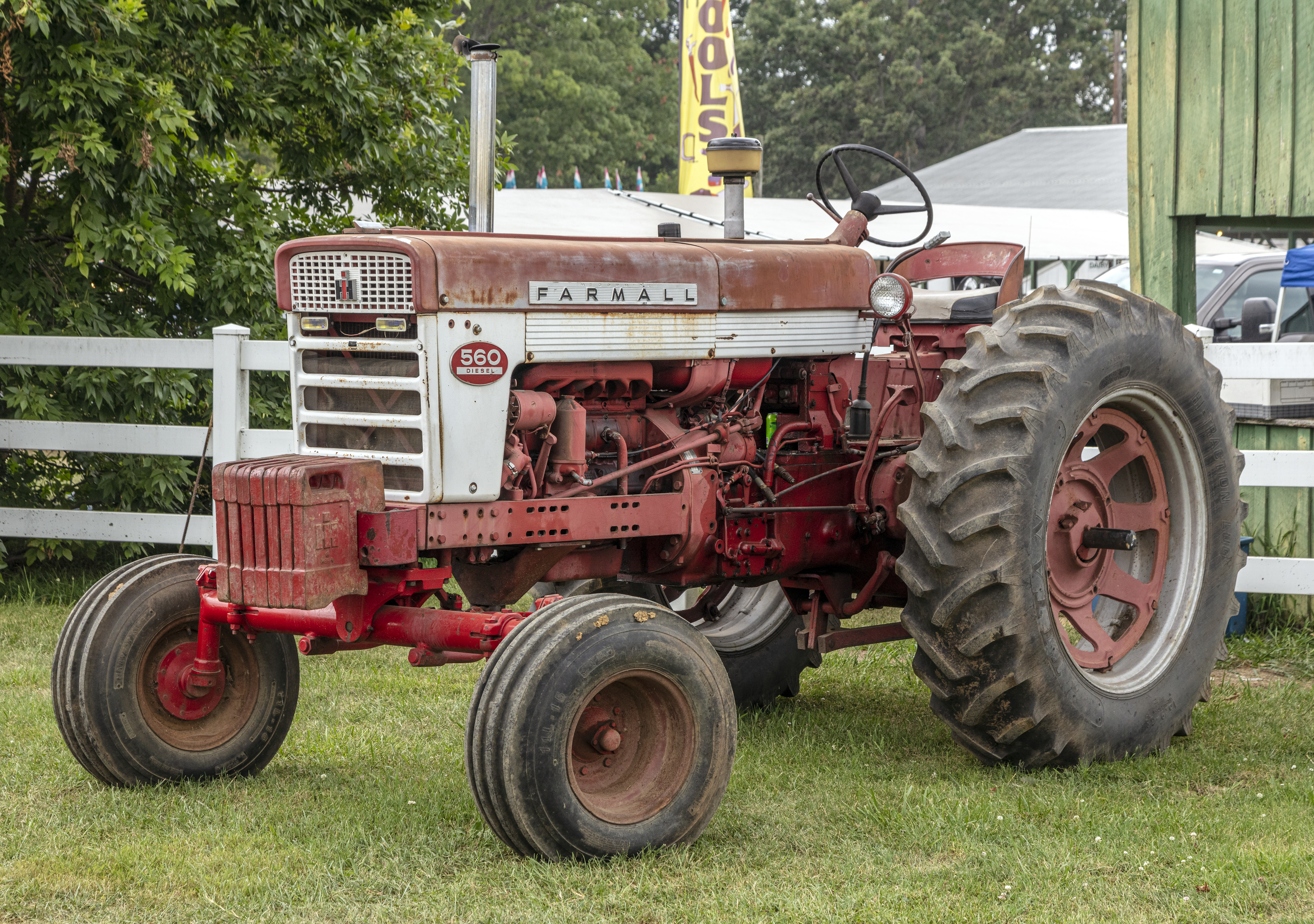
560 with wide front wheels

Since the transmission components were unaltered from the original M systems, the larger engines produced immediate reliability issues, resulting in a public relations problem for International Harvester, and requiring replacement with new, redesigned powertrain components. The 560 had been restyled from previous series in an attempt to modernize the appearance of the Farmall line. About 70,000 560s were produced. Prices ranged from $6,000 for gasoline versions to $6,700 for diesels.

== International Harvester 660 ==
The 660 was not offered under the Farmall name as a row-crop tractor. It was a heavy general-purpose tractor whose lineage was more closely aligned with the McCormick-Deering W-9, and was the successor to the International Harvester 650. 6,959 were built from 1959 to 1963.

== Comparable products ==
The Oliver 770 and Massey MF65 were comparable to the 460. The Oliver 880, Massey 85, and Cockshutt 570 were similar to the 560.
