= Farmall 04 series tractors =

The Farmall 04 series tractors are a family of row-crop tractors with four-cylinder engines, continuing the tradition of four-cylinder engines in Farmall and parent company International Harvester for general-purpose and row-crop tractors. In the early 1960s demand for more power led to the 06 series with six-cylinder engines. Four-cylinder engines were reserved for tractors equivalent to the Farmall H and smaller.

== Farmall 404 ==
The Farmall 404 is a medium-sized row-crop tractor, produced from 1961 through 1967. It was effectively the successor to the Farmall 340, using the same 135-cubic-inch (2,210 cc) engine, with options for gasoline or LP gas fuel. The 404 was the first Farmall of its size to use a three-point hitch, which had become an industry standard. Steering used a hydrostatic power system. The utility version was the International Harvester IH 404, and the industrial tractor was the IH 2404.

== Farmall 504 ==
The Farmall 504 is a somewhat larger version of the 404, with larger engines in gasoline, LP gas and diesel versions, produced from 1961 to 1968. Engine displacement was 152 cubic inches (2,490 cc). The 504 had a broader range of features and options than the 404, with the same power steering and three-point hitch. A high-clearance version was produced, as well as the IH 504 utility tractor and the IH 2504 industrial tractor. About 3,000 404s were produced, selling for about $3,300.

== Farmall 544 ==
The Farmall 544 was produced from 1968 to 1973 as the replacement for the 504. It was offered with an optional hydrostatic transmission in two ranges, while the regular model had a five-speed transmission with a torque amplifier. The utility version was the IH 544, and the industrial tractor was the IH 2544. About 17,000 504s were produced, at a sale price from $3,800 to $4,300 for gasoline models, and $4,400 to $4,800 for diesel versions.

== Comparable products ==
The Massey Ferguson MF505 and Allis-Chalmers D-12 were comparable to the 404. The John Deere 2010 and the Allis-Chalmers D-15 corresponded to the 504. The 544 was comparable to the John Deere 2520 and the Massey Ferguson 165.
