= Farmall Australia =

International Harvester produced farm tractors in Australia under both the Farmall and McCormick International brands from 1939 until 1973, after which only the McCormick International brand was used. As in the North American market, the Farmall brand was reserved primarily for row-crop tractors with narrow front wheels. Farmall tractors were sold alongside wide-front McCormick International-badged tractors of the same series. Initial production was mainly from imported parts. The first fully-Australian-made tractors were not built at the Geelong works until 1948.

== International Harvester in Australia ==
International Harvester (IH) began selling agricultural equipment in Australia in 1903. IH predecessors McCormick and Deering had sold equipment in Australia since 1884. Early production, using imported parts, took place in Spotswood, Victoria, near the company's Australian headquarters in Melbourne. The International Harvester Company of Australia Pty. Ltd. was established in 1912, and took over all assets owned by its predecessors.

During the Great Depression, the Australian government imposed high duties on imported farm equipment, leading IH to establish production facilities in Australia. A site in Geelong, Victoria was purchased in 1927, and the plant was opened in 1939. Beginning in 1940, plant production was diverted to war production while continuing to produce agricultural equipment. The plant doubled in size starting in 1947, but most tractors were still made using substantial quantities of imported parts. In 1948, the first fully Australian-made tractor, an AW-6, was produced.

== Farmall production ==
The Farmall M was manufactured in Australia from 1949 to 1954 at Geelong. Initial production primarily consisted of local assembly of parts made in the United States, but as time went on a larger proportion of each machine was produced locally. The standard fuel for Australian tractors at the time was kerosene, as opposed to the North American market where distillate and petrol (gasoline) were more usual. Ms and McCormick W-6s were produced on the same line. The greater proportion of production was the W-6, which was preferred for Australian farming practices. Some industrial tractors were included in production. Beginning in 1951 the by now entirely Australian-made Geelong tractors were designated as AM and AW-6, with McCormick International branding for tractors destined for farm use and International for industrial tractors. Production ran until 1954

From 1953 to 1957 the line was replaced by a series of "Super" models. A Super AW-6 was produced along with a diesel-engined AWD-6. Likewise, the Super AM and Super AMD diesel were produced. An orchard version, the AOS-6, did not have the upgraded engines of the Supers and was not produced with a diesel engine. From 1957 to 1961 the uniquely Australian AM-7 and AW-7 replaced the Super AM and Super AW-6.

Beginning in 1961 the line was restyled in the same manner as North American tractors, with more powerful four-cylinder engines than previous models. The A514 was mechanically equivalent to the British Farmall B-450 and resembled the North American Farmall 560. It was intended to replace the Farmall AM-7. The tractor was built with narrow, wide, and adjustable wide front axles. From 1964 the A514 was replaced by the A554. Engine choices continued to be kerosene and diesel, with petrol engines available for industrial versions. As with the North American lines of the time, the rear ends were not well-matched to the power that had been added, and the power trains had to be uprated. The A564 replaced the A554 in 1967 with minimal changes. A564s dropped the McCormick International branding in favour of "International." The Farmall brand was discontinued by IH in Australia and North America at the same time in 1973.

=== Australian models ===
- AM (Kerosene)
- McCormick International AW-6 (Kerosene, wide front)
- Farmall Super AM (Kerosene, row crop)
- Farmall Super AMD (Diesel, row crop)
- McCormick International Super AW-6 (Kerosene, wide front)
- McCormick International Super AWD-6 (Diesel, wide front)
- Farmall AM-7 (Kerosene, row cop)
- Farmall AMD-7 (Diesel, row crop)
- McCormick International AW-7 (Kerosene, wide front)
- McCormick International AWD-7 (Diesel, wide front)
- McCormick International AOS-6 (Kerosene, wide front orchard tractor)
- McCormick International A514
- McCormick International A554 (Kerosene, wide front)
- McCormick International A554 (Diesel, wide front)
- Farmall A554 (Diesel, row crop)
- McCormick International A564 (Diesel, wide front)
- Farmall A564 (Diesel, row crop)

==== US Models also manufactured in Australia ====
- Farmall M (Kerosene)

==== UK Models also manufactured in Australia ====
- McCormick International A414
