= Farmall 340 =

Row crop tractor

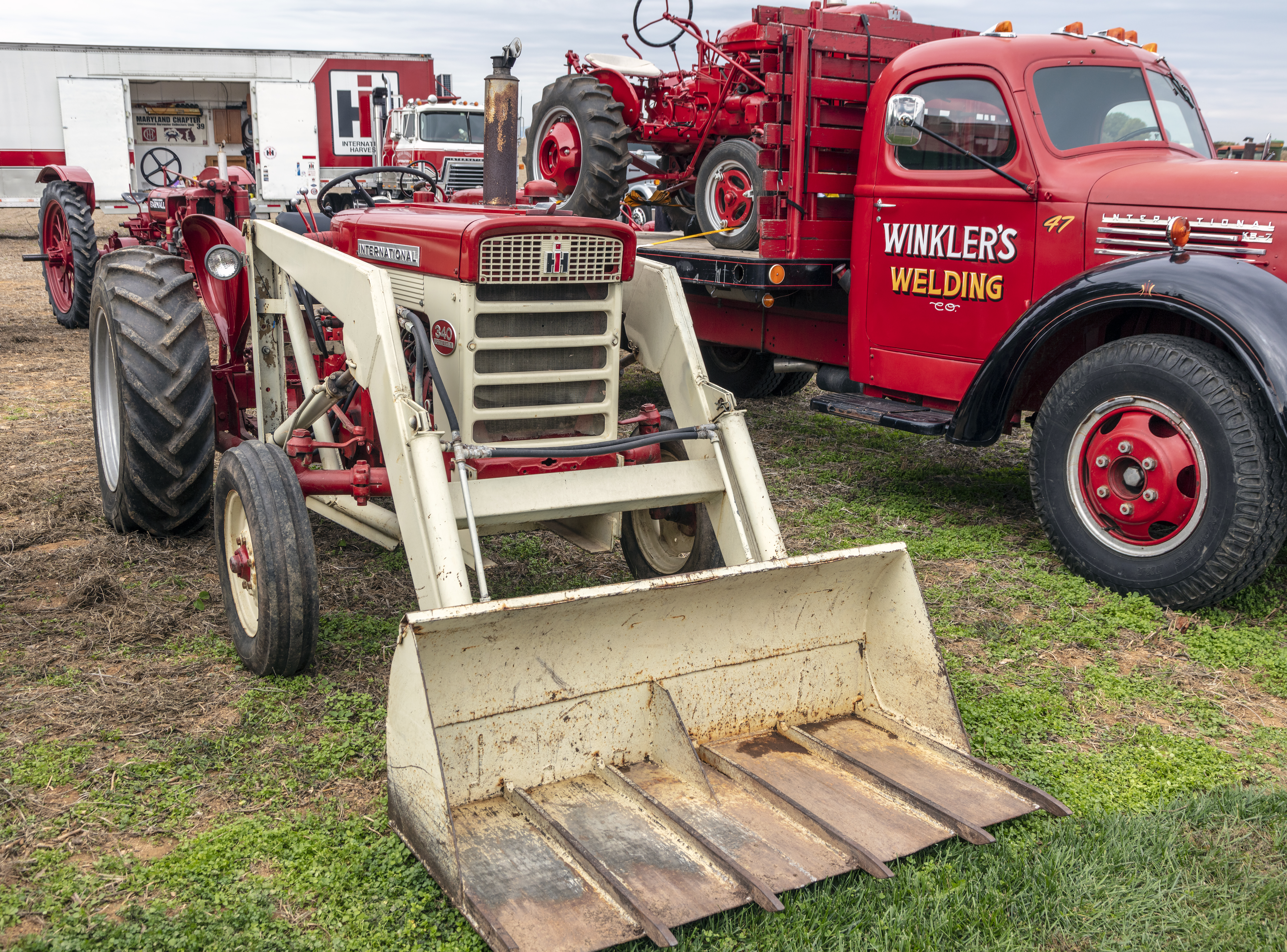
- Farmall 340 pictured in Monrovia, Maryland
- Type: Row-crop agricultural tractor
- Manufacturer: International Harvester
- Production: 1957-1963
- Length: 117 inches (300 cm)
- Width: 64 inches (160 cm)
- Height: 59 inches (150 cm) to steering wheel)
- Weight: 4,735 pounds (2,148 kg) (gasoline), 5,195 pounds (2,356 kg) (diesel), 7,579 pounds (3,438 kg) (ballasted)
- Propulsion: Rear wheels
- Engine model: International Harvester C135
- Gross power: 47 horsepower (35 kW)
- PTO power: 34.74 horsepower (25.91 kW) (belt)
- Drawbar power: 31.76 horsepower (23.68 kW)
- Drawbar pull: 5,142 pounds (2,332 kg) (gasoline)
- NTTL test: 665
- Preceded by: Farmall 350

The Farmall 340 is a medium-sized row-crop tractor, first produced as part of the Farmall line by International Harvester in 1957. The 340 was a completely new design, unrelated to its predecessor the Farmall 350. Production ran until 1963 for the Farmall model, while production under the International and International Harvester name ran until 1965.

== Description ==
The 340 used a new 47-horsepower (35 kW) 135-cubic-inch (2,210 cc) four-cylinder gasoline engine, connected to a torque amplifier that gave an effective range of ten gears. A diesel version had a 166-cubic-inch (2,720 cc) engine, with the same horsepower. The 340's new hydraulic system used transmission oil is the hydraulic fluid. The International Harvester IH 340 was the utility version, and the International 340 was the industrial version. A crawler version was sold as the T-340, or the TD-340 with a diesel engine. The Farmall 340 was offered in an orchard and grove configuration. Crawler versions were sold until 1965. About 800 were produced, the gasoline models selling for about $3,600 and the diesels for about $4,300.

== Comparable products ==
The Case 441 and Massey MF33 were comparable to the 340.
