= McCormick-Deering W series tractors =

General-purpose crop tractor

McCormick-Deering W-9
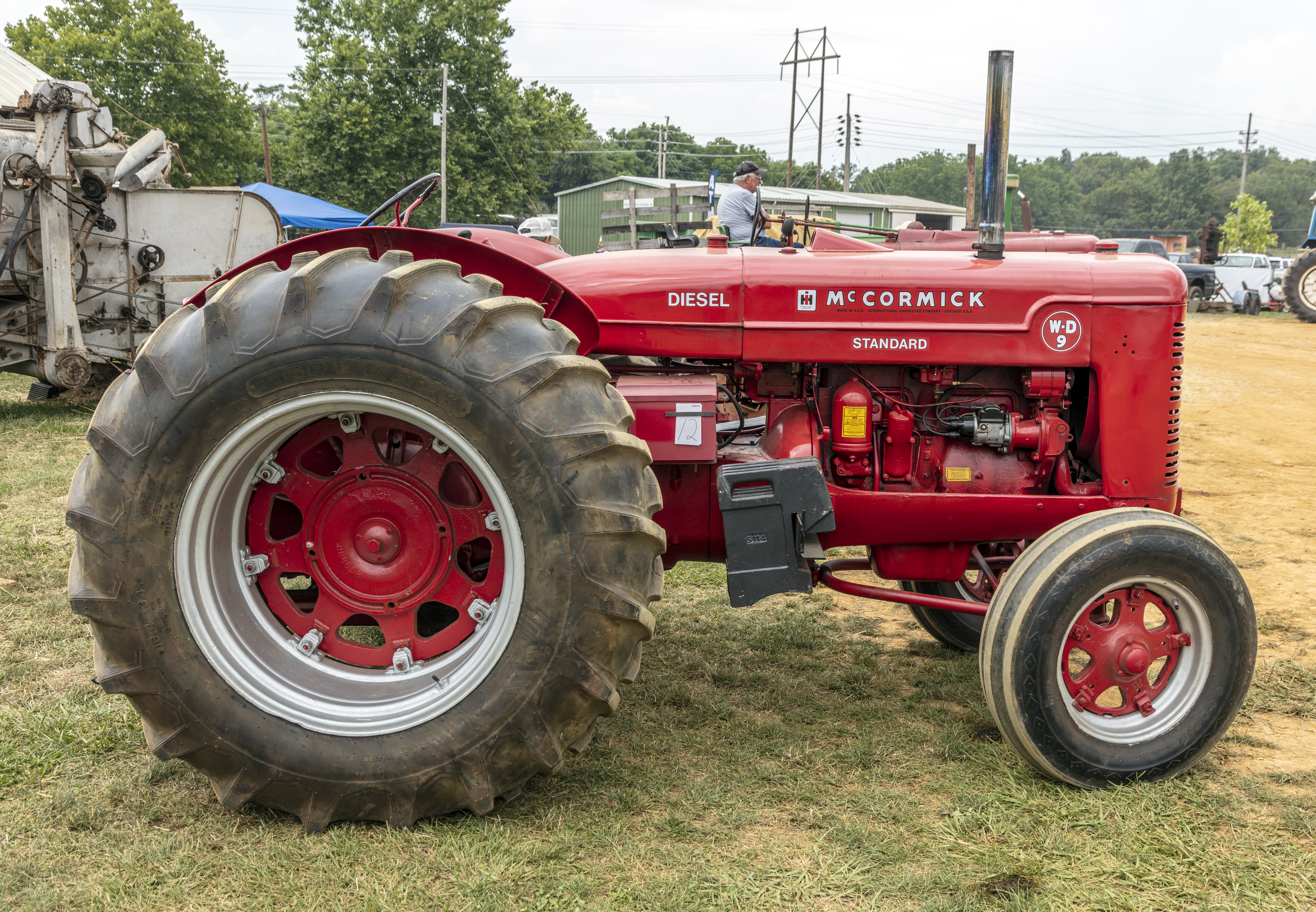
- McCormick-Deering W-D 9
- Type: General-use agricultural tractor
- Manufacturer: International Harvester
- Production: 1940–1953
- Propulsion: Rear wheels
- Engine model: International Harvester C335 (gasoline)
- Gross power: 44 horsepower (33 kW)
- PTO power: 49.40 horsepower (36.84 kW) (belt)
- Drawbar power: 44.15 horsepower (32.92 kW)
- Drawbar pull: 4,365 pounds (1,980 kg)
- Speed: 16.3 miles per hour (26.2 km/h) forward, 3.1 miles per hour (5.0 km/h) reverse
- NTTL test: 369
- Succeeded by: International Harvester 660

The McCormick-Deering W series tractors were a range of standard-tread farming and industrial tractors produced by International Harvester that were derived from the Farmall letter series row-crop tractors of the 1940s and 1950s. Branded by International Harvester as McCormick-Deering products, with the same styling and red paint as the Farmall line, the W series had fixed wheel widths, lower height and wide front axles. Starting in 1956 the W series was integrated into the International Harvester numbering series and the McCormick-Deering branding was dropped.

== Description ==
In contrast to the letter series row-crop tractors, which were intended to straddle one or more rows in a field with high clearances and adjustable axles, the W tractors had fixed wheel widths and a generally lower profile with smaller rear wheels and wide front axles, since they were meant for plowing, orchards, wheatfields and other applications that did not require the row-crop features. The McCormick-Deering W series was closely aligned with the International Harvester industrial tractor series. Industrial tractors had different gearing and a foot-operated throttle. The W series retained the same Raymond Loewy styling as the letter series tractors.

== McCormick-Deering W-4 ==
The McCormick-Deering W-4 was based on the Farmall H and used the same International Harvester C152 152-cubic-inch (2,490-cubic-centimetre) displacement gasoline engine, with options for kerosene and distillate fuels. A five-speed sliding-gear transmission was standard, with fifth gear disabled on tractors that were delivered with steel wheels. Overall weight for single rear wheel tractors was about 3,800 pounds (1,700 kg). The W-4 was first produced in 1940.

The industrial version was the International Harvester I-4. A McCormick-Deering O-4 was intended for vineyards and orchards, and had fenders and fairings designed to avoid snags on branches, with the exhaust routed underneath instead of overhead. The OS-4 version only had the underslung exhaust, without the sheet metal guards.

In 1953 the Super W-4 was introduced, with an International C164 engine with 164-cubic-inch (2,690-cubic-centimetre) displacement. A total of 35,868 W-4s of all versions were produced from 1940 to 1954.

=== International Harvester 300 ===
In 1955 the Super W-4 was replaced by the International 300 Utility or W-300, with a 169-cubic-inch (2,770 cc) engine, giving the 300 utility a three-plow rating. McCormick-Deering branding was dropped. The W-300 was produced in 1955 and 1956. The W-300 was followed by the International 350 Utility pr W-350 in 1957–58.

== McCormick-Deering W-6 ==
The McCormick-Deering W-6 was the W-series version of the Farmall M, using the M's C248 engine, again in gasoline, distillate or kerosene versions. The remainder of the W-6 drivetrain was similar to the W-4's, but the tractor was heavier at 4,800 pounds (2,200 kg). A diesel version was also offered, the WD-6. The WD-6 was rated for three or four plows. As with the W-4, versions were made in W-6, WD-6, O-6, I-6 and ID-6 models. OS-6 and ODS-6 models omitted the sheet metal guards, but kept the rearranged exhausts.

The immediate predecessor to the W-6 was the International W-30, a version of the Farmall F-30, which had a wide front axle in comparison to the F-30's narrowly-space front wheels. The W-30 was produced from 1932 to 1940.

Super versions were introduced in 1952, using an IH C264 engine. A Super W6-TA and WD6-TA line was produced in 1954, with torque amplifier transmissions. Production of all models of the W-6 totaled 56,482 from 1940 to 1954. Australian models, designated AW-6, were produced from 1949 to 1953. The AW-7 followed in Australia, as a counterpart to the Farmall 400, from 1957 to 1960.

=== International Harvester 400 ===
In 1955 the Super W-6 was replaced by the International 400 Utility or W-400, with a 264-cubic-inch (4,330 cc) engine. McCormick-Deering branding was dropped. The W-400 was produced in 1955 and 1956. The W-400 was followed by the International 450 Utility or W-450 in 1956–58.

== McCormick-Deering W-9 ==
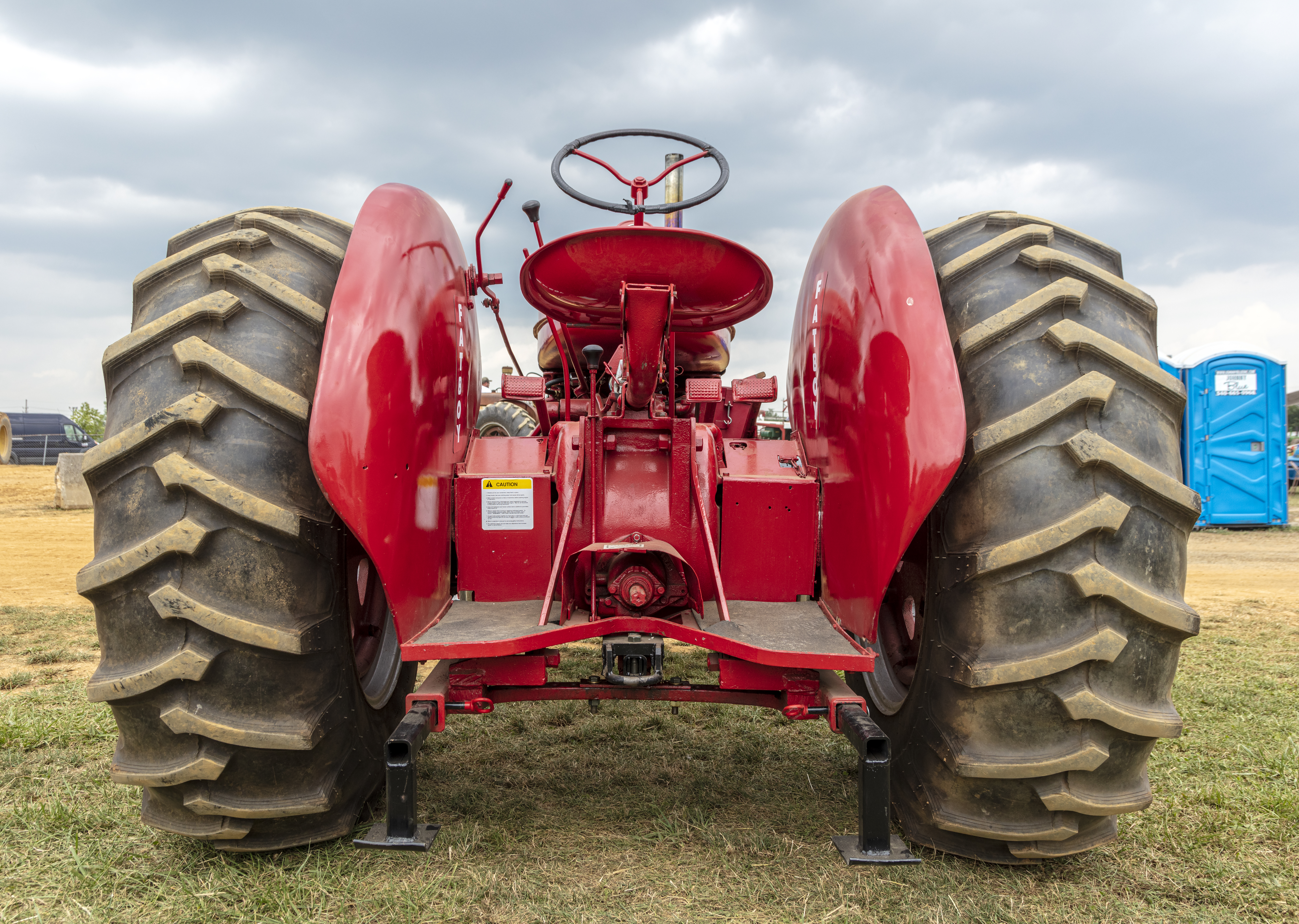
Rear view of a W-D 9, showing the low profile compared to row-crop tractors

The McCormick-Deering W-9 departed from the letter series parallel, using much more powerful engines from International Harvester's crawler tractors, and heavier drivetrains. The W-9 was first produced in 1940 with the C335 engine used in the T-9 crawler. Running on gasoline, distillate or kerosene, it produced 44 horsepower (33 kW). Operating weight was over 10,000 pounds (4,500 kg). A WD-9 diesel version of the same displacement was available. Industrial tractors were the International I-9 and ID-9, and a special steel-wheeled rice field variant was the WR-9 and WDR-9. The Super W-9/WD-9 was produced in 1953 with greater torque.

The predecessor to the W-9 was the McCormick-Deering W-40, a bigger version of the International W-30 with a six-cylinder engine, which was itself a wide-front-axle version of the Farmall F-30. A diesel-engine version was available, the WD-40. Both tractors were also sold as industrial tractors, the I-30 and ID-30. Production ran from 1934 to 1940.

=== International Harvester 600 ===
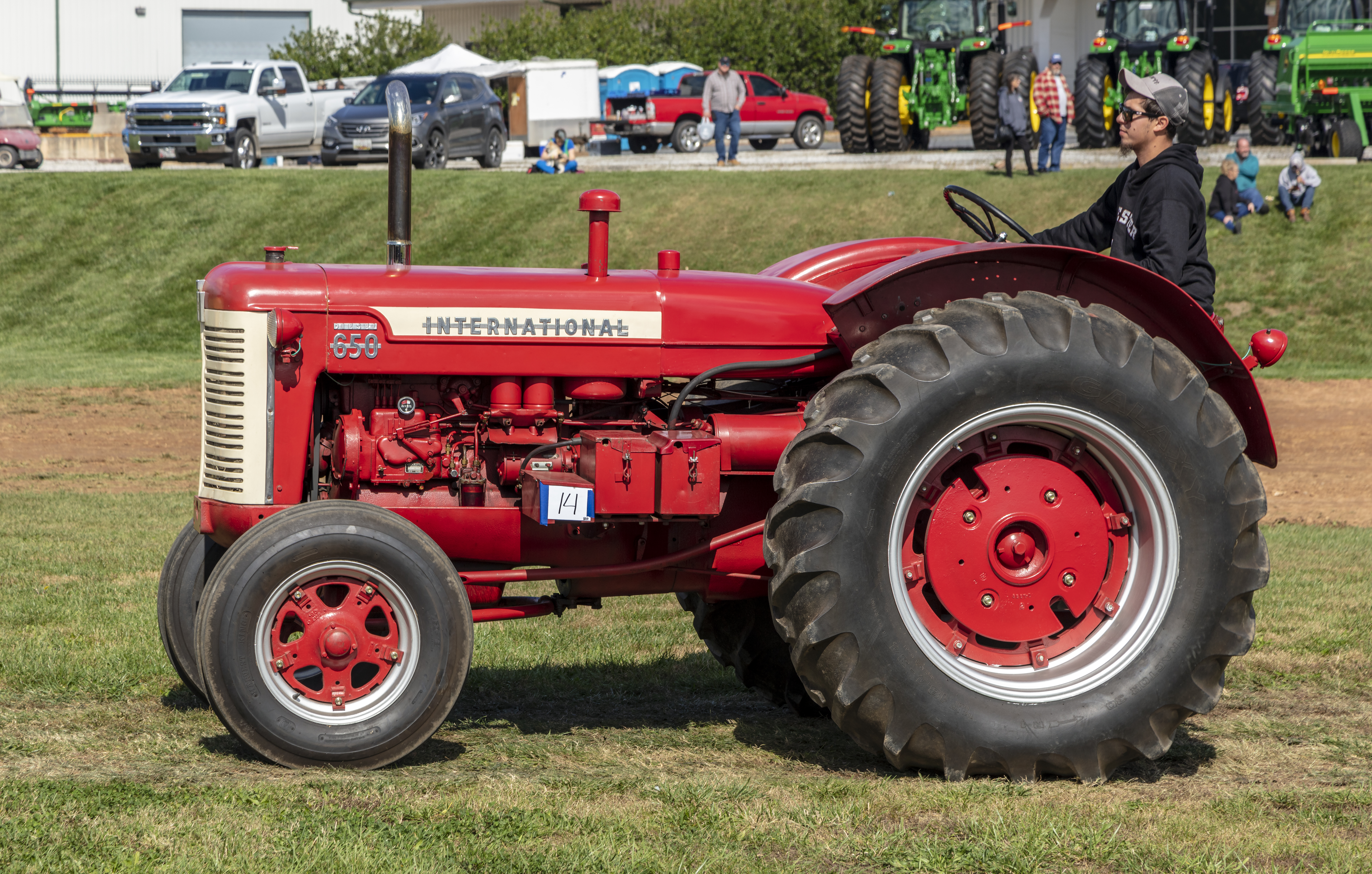
International 650 tractor

The International Harvester 600 was a re-badged version of the Super W-9, with few changes, following the Farmall 100/200/300/400 numbering scheme, and dropping McCormick-Deering branding in favor of "International." 1,516 600s were produced in 1956 and 1957. The International Harvester 650 was the successor to the 600, with a few more changes. 4,933 650s were produced in 1956 and 1957. The 650 was succeeded by the restyled International Harvester 660 in 1959.
