= Farmall Britain =

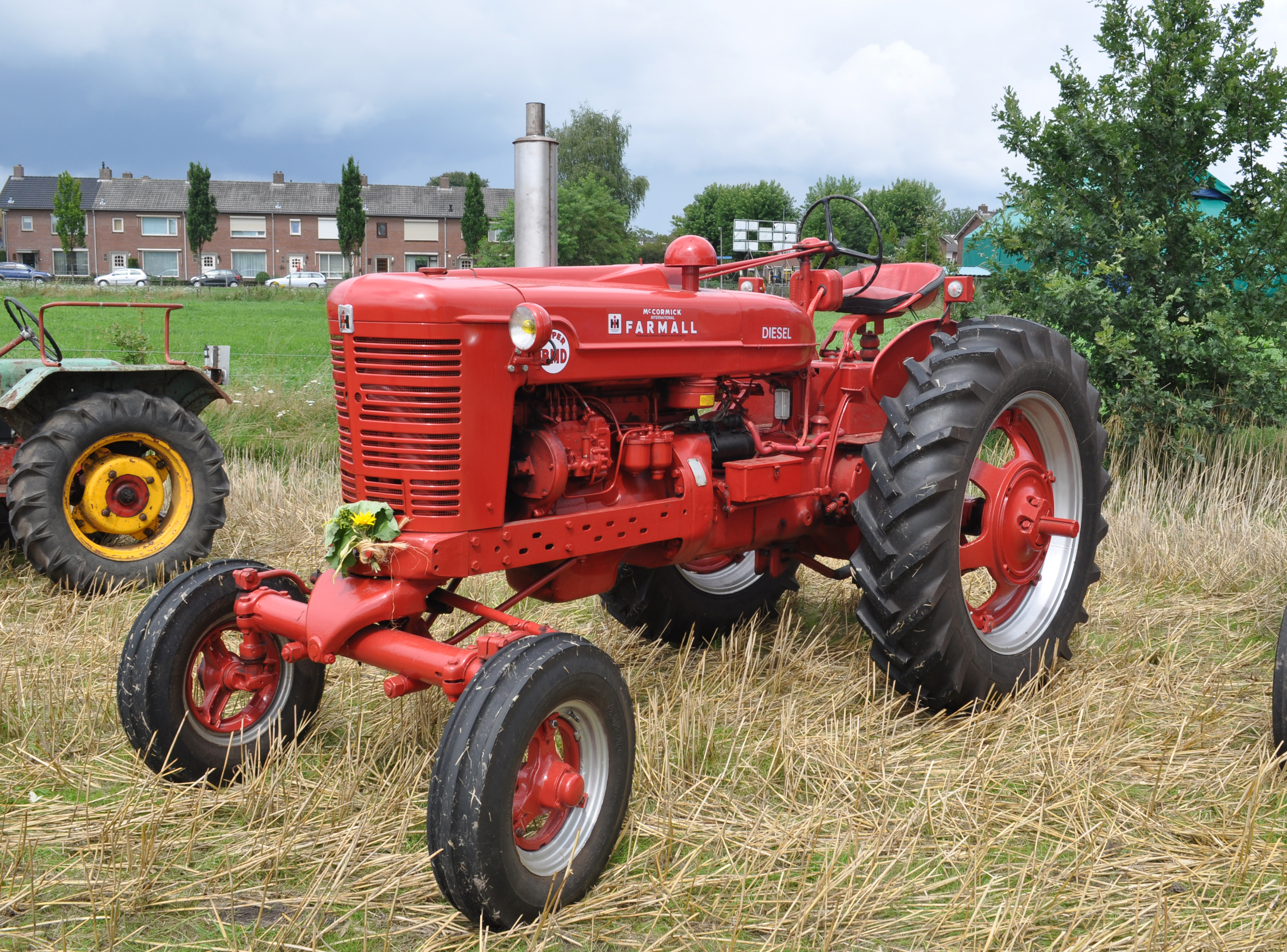
Farmall Super BMD

International Harvester's Farmall brand of tractors were built in the United Kingdom between 1949 and 1970. The Farmall name was applied sparingly to International Harvester's UK products, appearing only as the BM, BMD and B-450.

== History ==
The International Harvester Company of Great Britain (IHGB) was established in 1906 to sell International Harvester equipment in the United Kingdom. Manufacturing was eventually established in Doncaster, at a plant on Wheatley Hall Road, in 1949. In 1954 a second plant opened in Bradford, operating until 1982. A second Doncaster plant opened at Carr Hill in 1964.

== Farmall BM and BMD ==
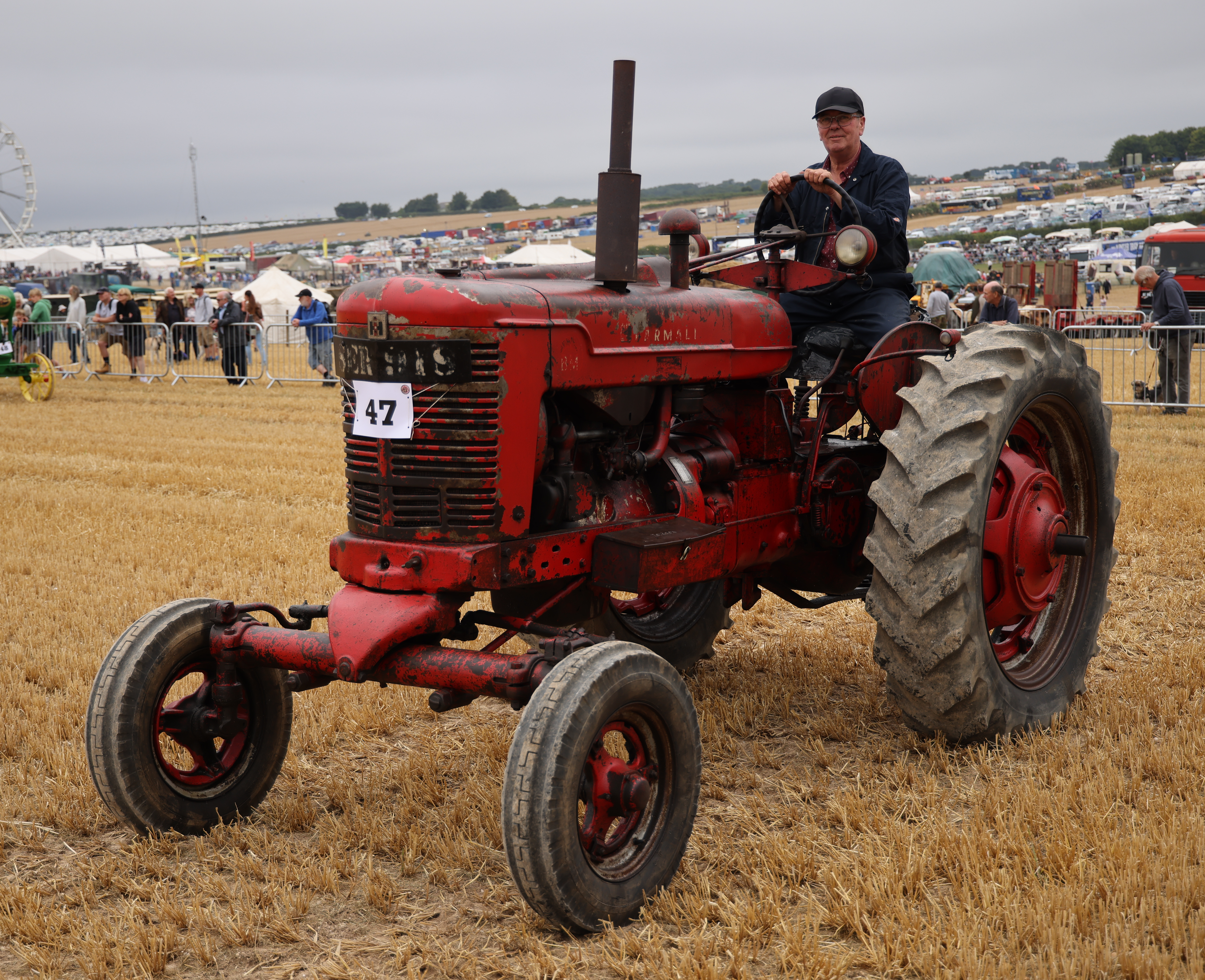
1952 International Farmall BM

Production of the Farmall BM from imported parts started at Doncaster in 1949. The BM was a Farmall M, usually equipped with a wide front axle rather than the narrow wheels popular in North America. The BMD diesel-engined version was offered beginning in 1952. Super BM and BMD models followed. In 1953, 53 BMD tractors were painted gold instead of red to commemorate the coronation of Queen Elizabeth II.

== Farmall B-450 ==
The Farmall B-450 was entirely produced in the United Kingdom. All other tractors produced in the UK at that time were sold as International Harvesters or Internationals. The B-450 was a restyled version of the McCormick International BWD-6, sold between 1957 and 1970.
