= Farmall Regular =

Row crop tractor

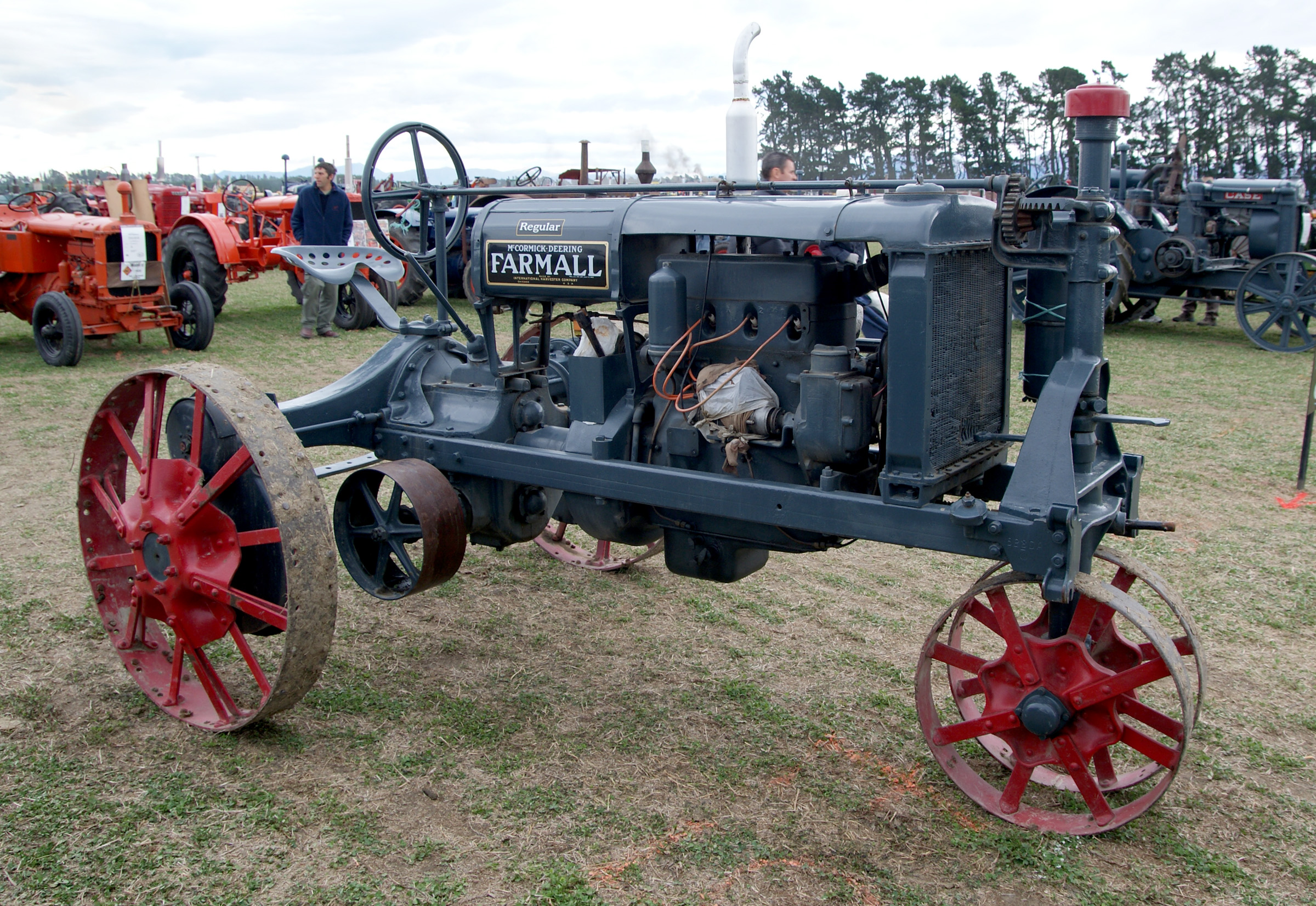
- Farmall Regular
- Type: Row-crop agricultural tractor
- Manufacturer: International Harvester
- Production: 1924-1932
- Length: 136 inches (350 cm)
- Width: 86 inches (220 cm)
- Height: 67 inches (170 cm) to steering wheel)
- Weight: 4,000 pounds (1,800 kg)
- Propulsion: Rear wheels
- Gross power: 22 horsepower (16 kW)
- PTO power: 20.05 horsepower (14.95 kW) (belt)
- Drawbar power: 13.27 horsepower (9.90 kW)
- Drawbar pull: 2,727 pounds (1,237 kg)
- NTTL test: 117
- Preceded by: McCormick-Deering 10-20
- Succeeded by: Farmall F-20

The Farmall Regular, or just the Farmall, was the first in the Farmall line of general-use row-crop tractors manufactured by International Harvester. The Regular was the first affordable tractor that could be used for plowing, stationary threshing, or cultivating. For most of its product life it was marketed as the "Farmall," with the "Regular" added when the Farmall F-20 and F-30 appeared as its successors. More than 134,000 were sold from 1924 to 1931.

== Development ==
International Harvester started development of a multi-purpose machine in 1910, confronting the difficulty of designing a machine that could do heavy work like plowing with the careful, precision task of row-crop cultivation. Until this time, cultivation was done by hand or with horses. Tractors were large affairs whose bulk could crush the crops, or which made it hard to see what was being done. The Farmall project was led by International Harvester Assistant Chief Engineer Bert R. Benjamin, who was the tractor's principal advocate in the company. The innovations pursued in the Farmall included making the front section of the tractor as narrow as possible, placing the front wheels close together in front. This would allow the front wheels to run in a furrow, and the adjustable rear wheels to ride in the next furrows out. Differential braking for rear wheels would allow tight, controlled turns. An experimental model was developed in 1920. By 1923, prototypes of the rear-wheel-drive tractor with narrow front wheels were working crops. Production began in 1924, with tractors selling for $825. Tractors were marketed with a range of attachments for various duties. A power take-off turning at 535 RPM was standard, along with a belt drum.

== Description ==
The Farmall was a fully recognizable machine in the pattern of the archetypal tricycle tractor arrangement, with narrowly-set steel wheels in front, a centerline engine, a seat mounted over the differential, and large steel rear wheels. Portal gears were used to raise the rear axle high enough to clear most row crops. Farmalls were made at the Rock Island, Illinois Farmall plant from 1926, at a price of $950. About 25 were built per day. The Regular was powered by a four-cylinder in-line 221-cubic-inch (3,620 cc) gasoline engine.

== Variants ==
A "Fairway" model was produced with wider steel wheels for use on golf courses. Narrow-tread models were sold, as well as an orchard variant with sheet metal fenders. About 31,000 Regulars of all kinds were produced, selling for between $825 and $950.

== Updates ==
When the Farmall F-30 was introduced in 1931, the base Farmall became the Farmall Regular. More than 134,000 Farmalls of all types were sold through 1931, when it began to be replaced by the Farmall F-20, F-30 and F-12.

== Comparable product ==
The Fordson F was a similar product offered by Fordson.

The John Deere Model D was a competing tractor from John Deere.
