= Farmall F-30 =

Row crop tractor

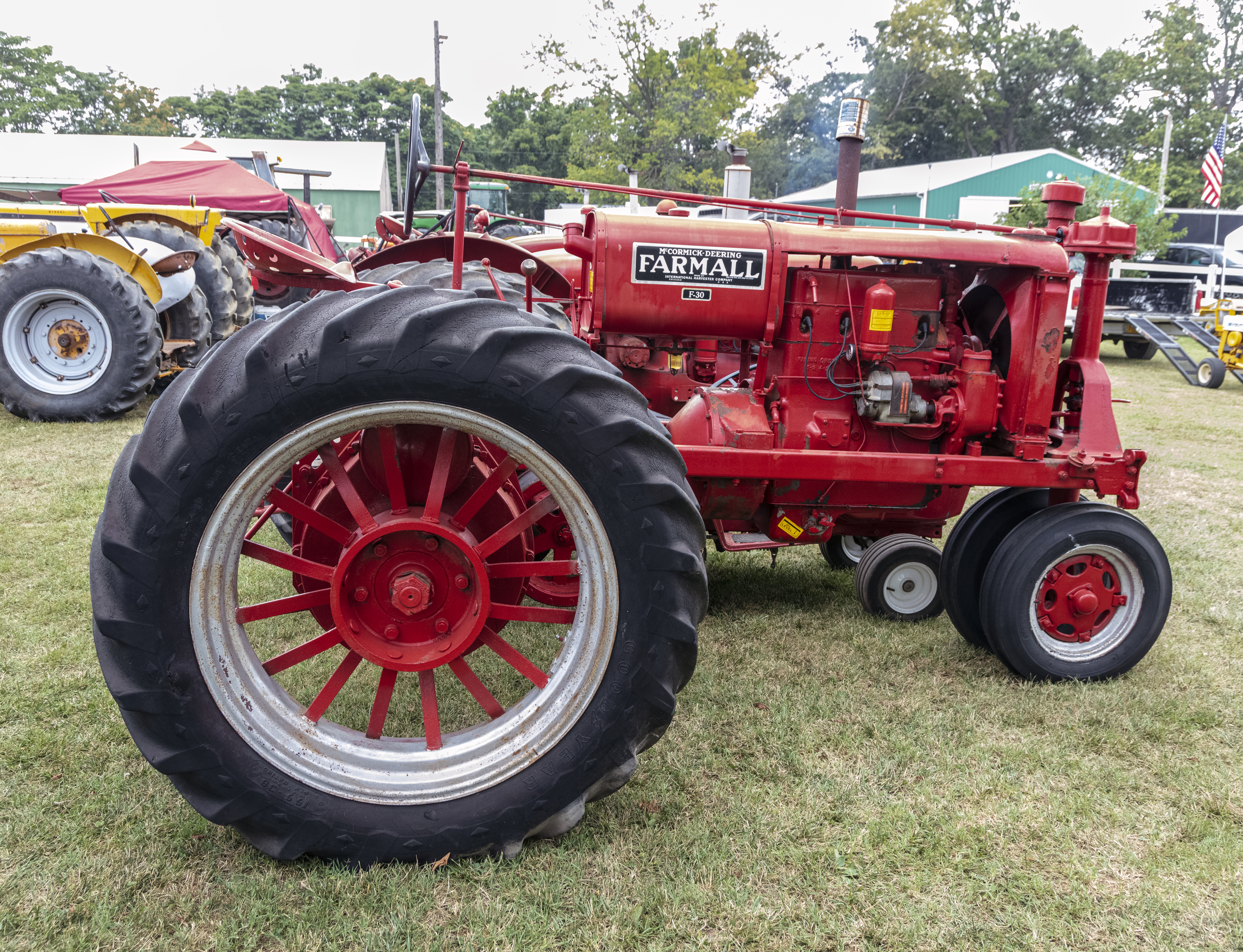
- Farmall F-30
- Type: Row-crop agricultural tractor
- Manufacturer: International Harvester
- Production: 1931-1939
- Length: 147 inches (370 cm)
- Width: 90 inches (230 cm)
- Height: 81 inches (210 cm) to steering wheel)
- Weight: 5,300 pounds (2,400 kg)
- Propulsion: Rear wheels
- Gross power: 33 horsepower (25 kW)
- PTO power: 32.80 horsepower (24.46 kW) (belt)
- Drawbar power: 24.85 horsepower (18.53 kW)
- Drawbar pull: 4,157 pounds (1,886 kg)
- NTTL test: 198
- Preceded by: Farmall Regular
- Succeeded by: Farmall M

The Farmall F-30 is a large three-plow row crop tractor produced by International Harvester under the Farmall brand from 1931 to 1939, with approximately 28,900 produced. It was a larger successor to the Farmall Regular, and was replaced in 1939 by the Farmall M as the largest tractor in the Farmall line.

== Description and production ==
The F-30 was a modernization of the earlier Farmall Regular, with the capabilities of the International Harvester 15-30. It had improved narrow front wheels and a four-cylinder overhead valve engine with 33 horsepower (25 kW), feeding a four-gear transmission. The F-30 name implied that the machine could pull three plows. Versions were available for gasoline, distillate and kerosene fuels. The rear portal axle used drop gears to raise the clearance underneath the tractor higher than a simple axle would allow. A wide front axle was available as an option. The first tractors were delivered with steel wheels, with pneumatic tires being offered in 1933. Early-year F-30s were painted gray, like the Regular. Beginning in 1936 the F-30 was painted bright red, to increase visibility; this quickly became a trademark of the Farmall line. About 28,900 were produced during the product run. Purchase prices were between $1,100 and $1,300.

== Variants ==
The standard-tread tractor version of the F-30 was the International W-40, a predecessor to the McCormick-Deering W-6. The standard tractor was meant for work not involving row crops, and had wide front wheels, a lower profile, and smaller rear wheels. A version of the F-30 with a narrow rear wheelset and wide front wheels was produced for sugar cane cultivation, known as the F-30 Cane Special.

== Comparable product ==
The Oliver 18/27 was a comparable product offered by the Oliver Farm Equipment Company.
