= Farmall H =

Row crop tractor

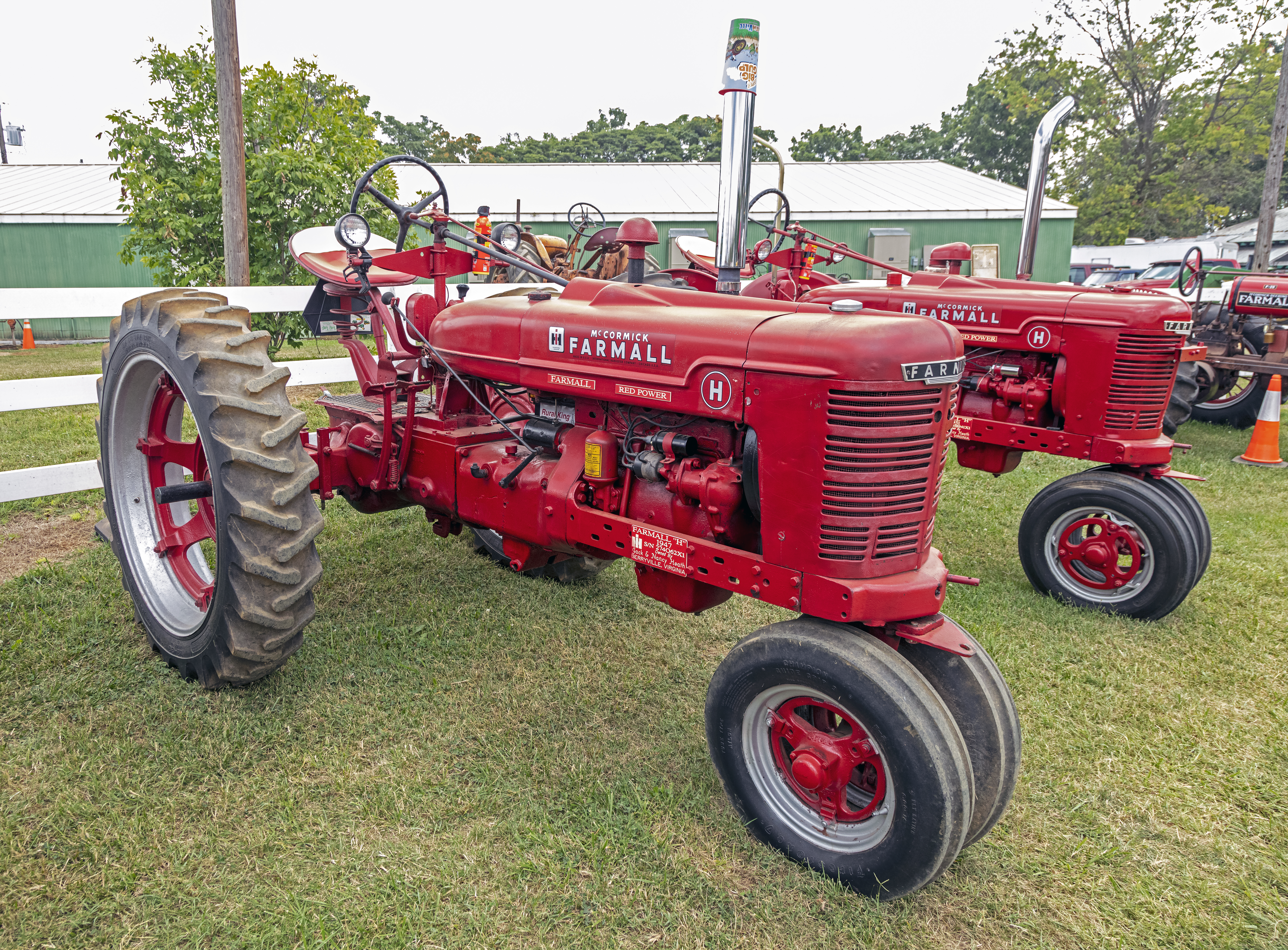
- Two Farmall H tractors
- Type: Row-crop agricultural tractor
- Manufacturer: International Harvester
- Production: 1939–1954
- Length: 125.25 inches (318.1 cm)
- Width: 75.7 inches (192 cm)
- Height: 74 inches (190 cm) to steering wheel)
- Weight: 2,845 pounds (1,290 kg)
- Propulsion: Rear wheels
- Engine model: International Harvester C152
- Gross power: 26 horsepower (19 kW)
- PTO power: 26.20 horsepower (19.54 kW) (belt)
- Drawbar power: 24.17 horsepower (18.02 kW)
- Drawbar pull: 3,603 pounds (1,634 kg)
- Speed: 16.3 miles per hour (26.2 km/h) forward, 2.7 miles per hour (4.3 km/h) reverse
- Preceded by: Farmall F-20
- Succeeded by: Farmall Super H, followed by Farmall 300 and 350, replaced by Farmall 340

The Farmall H is a medium-sized two-plow row crop tractor produced by International Harvester under the Farmall brand from 1939 to 1954. It was the most widely produced of International Harvester's "letter series", with approximately 390,000 produced over the 14-year run. It succeeded the Farmall F-20. The H was incrementally updated with new model numbers as the Super H, 300, and 350, but remained essentially the same machine. The original H used an International Harvester C152 4-cylinder in-line engine. Production of all versions lasted until 1963.

== Description and production ==
Styled by Raymond Loewy, it was one of International Harvester's "letter series", replacing the Farmall F-20. The H was rated for two 14-inch (36 cm) plows.

The H is equipped with a 4-cylinder in-line overhead valve with a 152-cubic-inch (2,490-cubic-centimetre) displacement and a 6-volt, positive ground electrical system with generator, (when so ordered or retrofitted). The sliding-gear transmission includes six total gears: five forward and one reverse. Early distillate and kerosene models started on gasoline and switched to their regular fuels once they were warmed up. A gasoline engine was added to the line in 1940. The top road speed was 17 miles per hour (27 km/h), but the fifth gear was not enabled on tractors sold with steel wheels, an option present in early models and during World War II, when rubber was rationed. The standard front wheels were closely-spaced nose wheels, with options for a single wheel or a wide front axle. Rear wheels could be adjusted from 44 inches (110 cm) to 80 inches (200 cm) in width to allow for different crop row widths. An optional extended axle allowed widths of up to 100 inches (250 cm).

The H was the smaller of the two prominent row crop tractors produced by IH from the late 1930s to the early 1950s, along with the Farmall M and its variants, yet could still use the same implements. As with the other letter-series IH tractors, the H used a modular design that allowed assemblies to be removed and replaced as units. All Hs had hydraulic lifts. The H was marketed to farmers with 100 acres (40 ha) or more of tilled land.

== H variants ==
Versions were produced for gasoline, distillate and kerosene fuels. Functional variants were the highboy HV for high crops, with 30.25 inches (76.8 cm) of clearance, the W-4 with standard tread, the I-4 for industrial use, and the O-4 for orchard use. About 392,000 Hs of all kinds were produced, and sold for between $850 and $1,650.

== Super H ==
In 1953 and 1954, International Harvester produced the Farmall Super H, which featured larger engine displacement of 164 cubic inches (2,690 cubic centimetres) and 32 horsepower (24 kW), along with sealed disc brakes, allowing it to be rated for two 16-inch (41 cm) plows. About 29,000 Super H tractors were produced. The Super H was replaced by the Farmall 300.

== Farmall 300 ==
Farmall 300
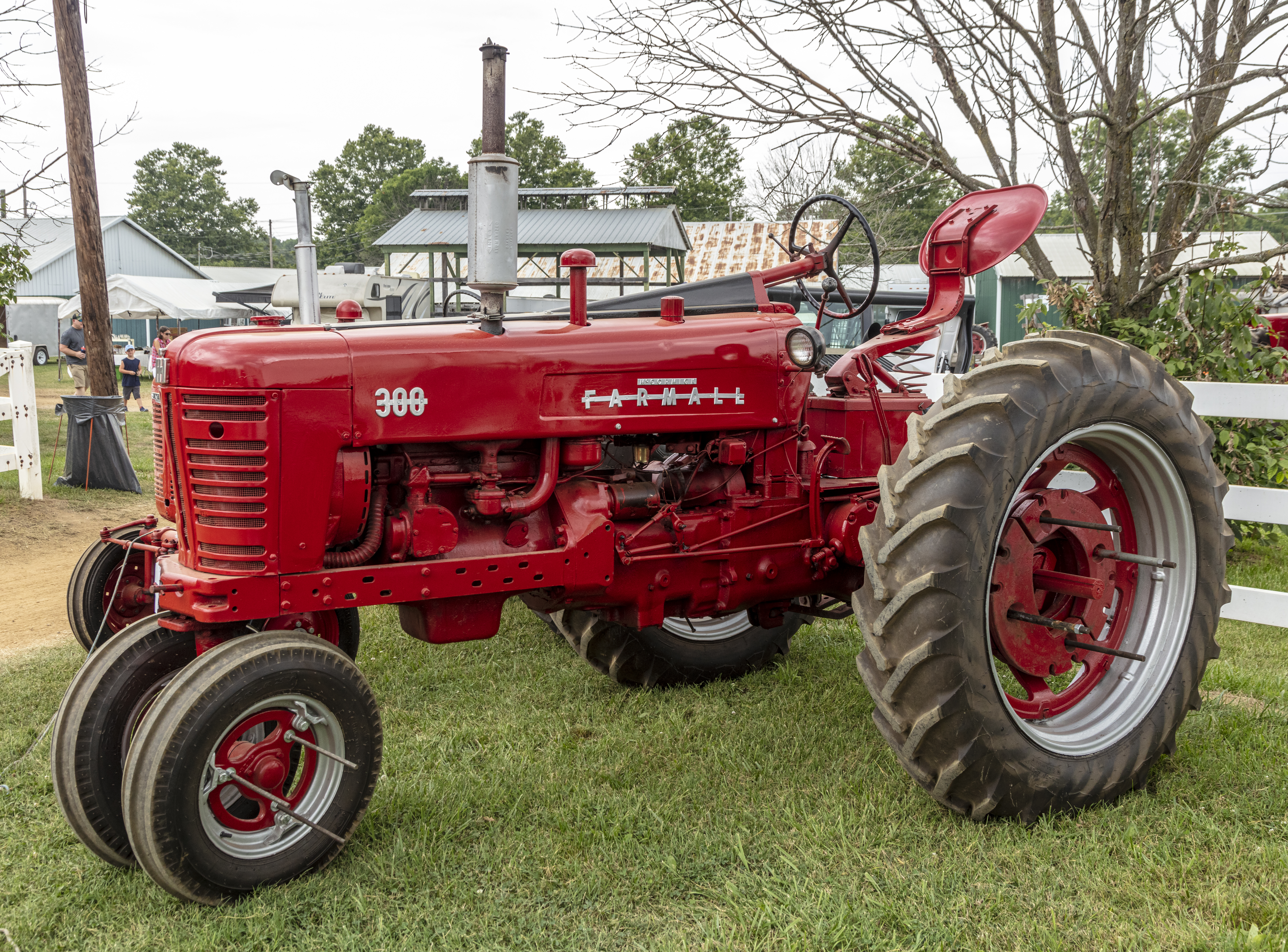
- Farmall 300
- Type: Row-crop agricultural tractor
- Manufacturer: International Harvester
- Production: 1954–1956
- Length: 136 inches (350 cm)
- Width: 100 inches (250 cm)
- Height: 77 inches (200 cm) (to steering wheel)
- Weight: 5,361 pounds (2,432 kg)
- Propulsion: Rear wheels
- Engine model: International Harvester C169 (gasoline)
- Gross power: 42 horsepower (31 kW)
- PTO power: 38.16 horsepower (28.46 kW) (belt)
- Drawbar power: 33.73 horsepower (25.15 kW)
- Drawbar pull: 5,650 pounds (2,560 kg)
- Speed: 16.2 miles per hour (26.1 km/h) forward, 3.1 miles per hour (5.0 km/h) reverse
- NTTL test: 538
- Preceded by: Farmall H
- Succeeded by: Farmall 350

The Farmall 300 replaced the Super H in 1954, and was produced until 1956. It was restyled with chrome badging, adding a torque amplifier transmission and a 169-cubic-inch (2,770-cubic-centimetre) engine with a liquefied petroleum gas option, and dropping the option for distillate fuel. Variants included the IH 300 utility tractor, and a 300 highboy model. Total production was 29,077, with an additional 170 high-clearance models.

== Farmall 350 ==
The Farmall 350 replaced the 300 in 1956 as an interim measure pending the introduction of the Farmall 340. Built from 1956 to 1958, it was slightly restyled from the 300. A Continental diesel engine was available as an option. The 350 was gradually replaced by the newly designed Farmall 340 beginning in 1957. About 28,000 350s were produced. The 350 was produced as a utility tractor under the International Harvester 350 label, along with the IH 350 High-Utility high-clearance version, and the IH 350 Wheatland non-row-crop version.

== Comparable products ==
Comparable products to the H include the John Deere B, Case SC, Massey 101 Junior, and the Minneapolis-Moline RTU. The Oliver Super 66, Ford 960 and John Deere 60 were comparable to the 300. The Case 511B, Massey MF65 and Minneapolis-Moline 445 were comparable to the 450.

== See also ==
- McCormick-Deering W-4
