= Farmall M =

Row crop tractor

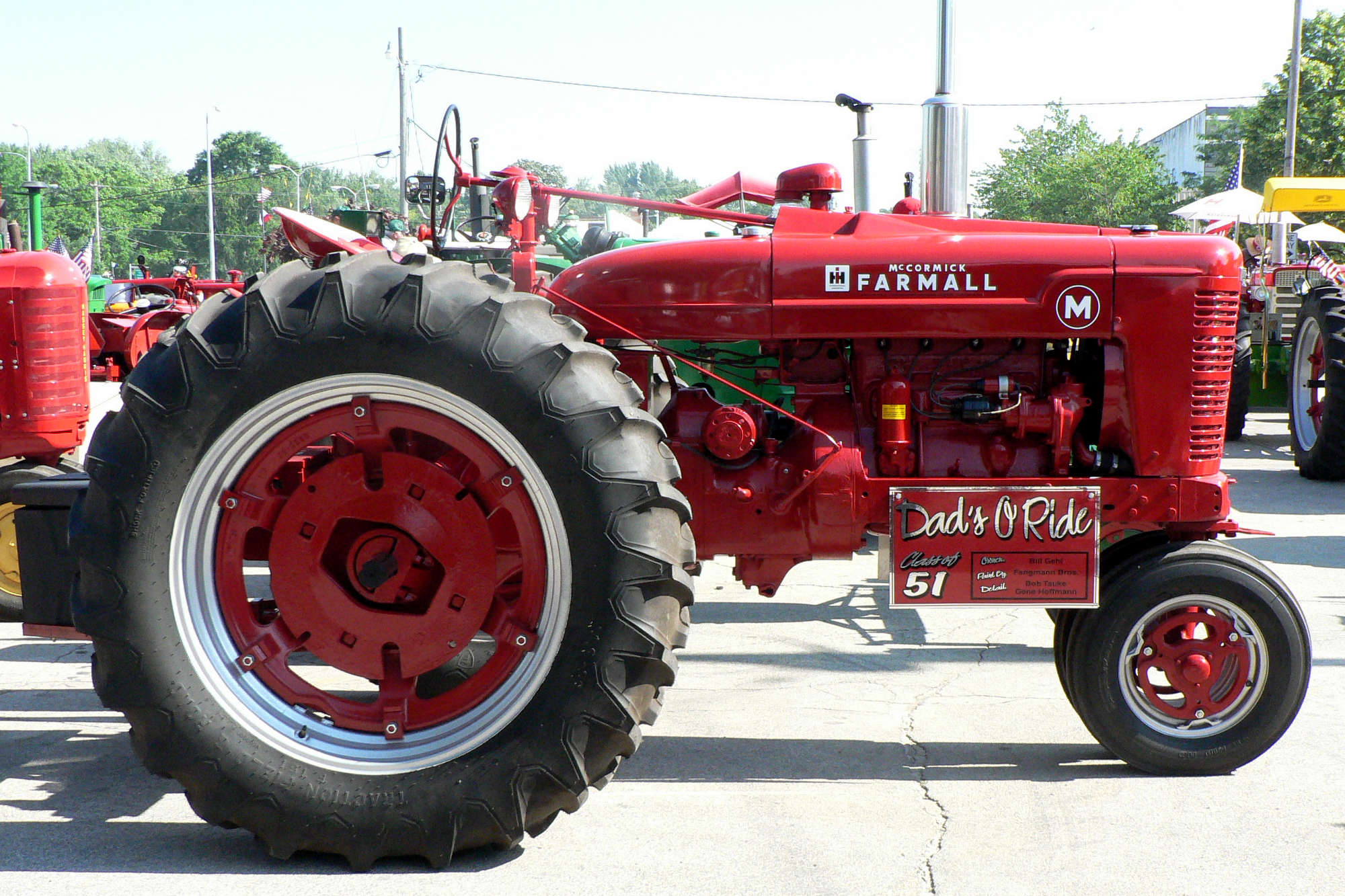
- Farmall M
- Type: Row-crop agricultural tractor
- Manufacturer: International Harvester
- Production: 1939-1954
- Length: 133 inches (340 cm)
- Width: 84 inches (210 cm)
- Height: 78.3 inches (199 cm) (to steering wheel)
- Weight: 4,858 pounds (2,204 kg), 6,770 pounds (3,070 kg) ballasted
- Propulsion: Rear wheels
- Engine model: International Harvester C248 (gasoline)
- Gross power: 38 horsepower (28 kW)
- PTO power: 34.82 horsepower (25.97 kW) (belt)
- Drawbar power: 30.62 horsepower (22.83 kW)
- Drawbar pull: 4,365 pounds (1,980 kg)
- Speed: 16.3 miles per hour (26.2 km/h) forward, 3.1 miles per hour (5.0 km/h) reverse
- NTTL test: 327
- Preceded by: Farmall F-30
- Succeeded by: Farmall Super M, followed by Farmall 400

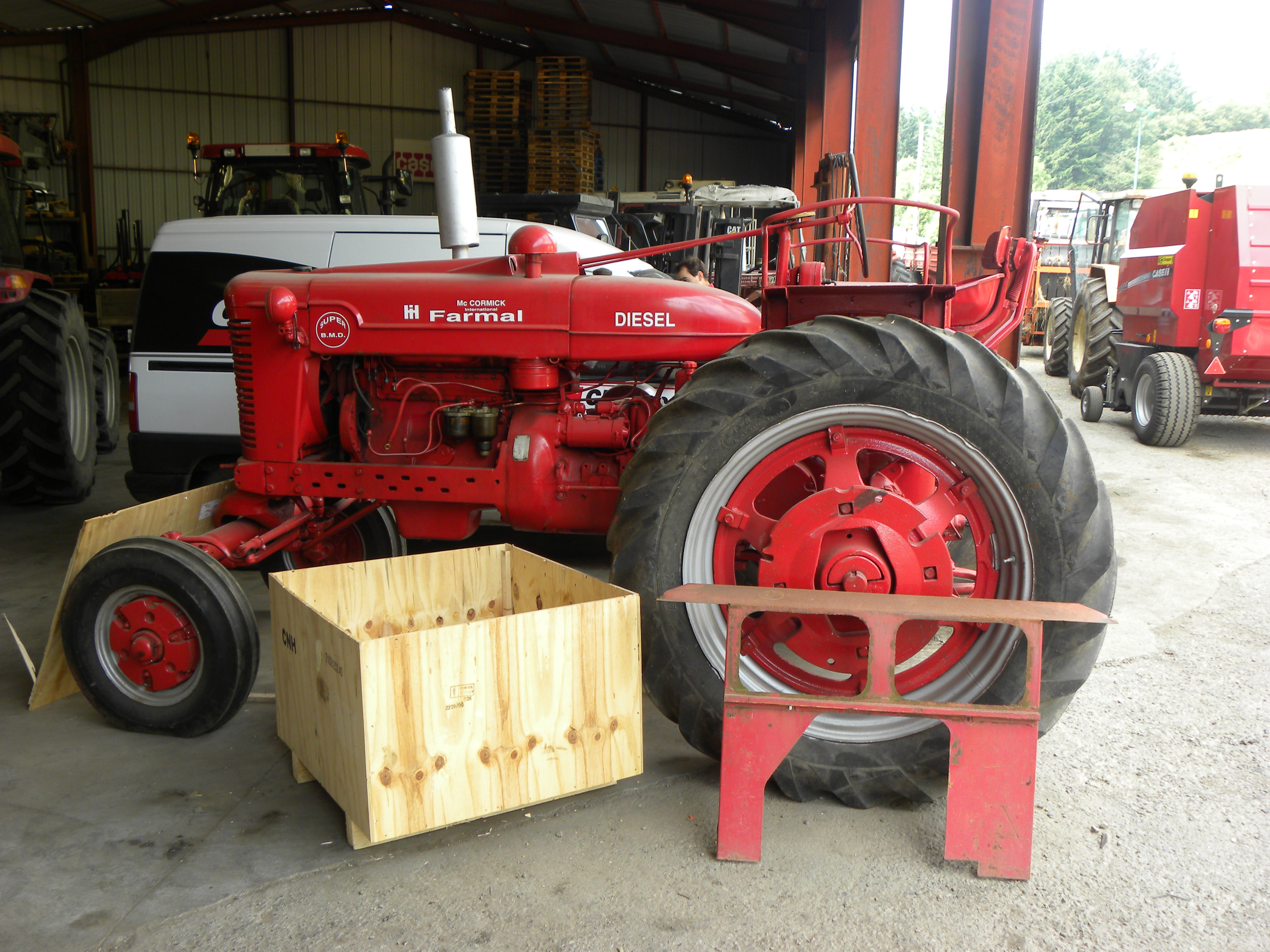
Farmall Super BMD, a Super MD produced in Britain

The Farmall M is a large three-plow row crop tractor produced by International Harvester under the Farmall brand from 1939 to 1953. It was of International Harvester's "letter series". It succeeded the Farmall F-30. The M was incrementally updated with new model numbers as the MD Super M, Super MD Super M-TA, but remained essentially the same machine. The original M used an International Harvester C248 4-cylinder in-line engine. Production of all versions lasted until 1954, when it was replaced by the Farmall 400, which was essentially the same machine with updated sheet metal.

== Description and production ==
Styled by Raymond Loewy, it was one of International Harvester's "letter series", replacing the Farmall F-30. The M was rated for three 14-inch (36 cm) moldboard plows, commonly called a three-bottom plow.

The M was one of the most-widely produced of International Harvester's "letter series", with 270,140 produced over the 13-year run. The M was equipped with an International Harvester C248 inline overhead valve four-cylinder engine with a 248-cubic-inch (4,060-cubic-centimetre) displacement, and a six-volt electrical system. The sliding-gear transmission had six total gears: five forward and one reverse.

The M was the larger of the two prominent row crop tractors produced by IH from the late 1930s to the early 1950s, along with the Farmall H and its variants, yet could still use the same implements. As with the other letter-series IH tractors, the M used a modular design that allowed assemblies to be removed and replaced as units. All Ms had hydraulic lifts. Versions were produced for gasoline and distillate fuels. Standard Ms had narrow front wheels on the centerline. Rear wheels could be adjusted on splined axles from 52 inches (130 cm) to 88 inches (220 cm) in width to allow for different row widths. An optional extended axle allowed widths of up to 100 inches (250 cm).

The standard M's purchase price in 1952 was US$2,400 (equivalent to $29,098 in 2025).

== M variants ==
Beginning in 1941, the M's production coincided with the Farmall MD, a diesel version of the M that would start on gasoline until warmed up sufficiently to switch to diesel. A total of 18,253 MD tractors were produced. In addition, IH produced the Farmall Super M from 1952 to 1954. The Super M featured a larger engine displacement than the standard M, at 264 cu in (4,330 cc). Variations of the Super M, the Super MD (a diesel version of the Super M) and the Super MTA (with a torque amplifier), were produced. In all, IH produced 44,551 Super M tractors, 5,199 Super MD tractors and 26,924 Super MTA tractors. High-clearance variants for farming vegetables and other high crops were also produced, including the Farmall MV and the MDV (diesel), as well as a standard front version (W-6) and the I-6 industrial tractor. Industrial tractors had fixed wheel widths, different gearing, foot throttles and usually had wide front axles. The M was produced in Britain as the BM.

In the United States, the M was produced in Rock Island, Illinois. Farmall M tractors produced in Britain and Australia were designated the BM/BMD and the AM, respectively. The models produced outside of North America mainly used wide front axles instead of the tricycle arrangement popular in the United States and Canada. The British model was produced from 1948 to 1953 in Doncaster, and the Australian model from 1949 to 1954 in Geelong.The M line was replaced by the Farmall 400.

=== Farmall M variants ===
- MD (diesel)
  - MDV (diesel, high crop)
- MV (high crop)
- Super M
  - Super M-TA (torque amplifier)
  - Super MD (diesel)
    - Super MDV (diesel, high crop)
    - Super MD-TA (diesel, torque amplifier)
    - Super MDV-TA (diesel, high crop, torque amplifier)
  - Super MV (high crop)
    - Super MV-TA (high crop, torque amplifier)
- BM (British, with above designations as necessary)
- AM (Australian, with above designations as necessary)
- LP M (Runs off liquid petroleum (LP))

== Farmall 400 ==
Farmall 400
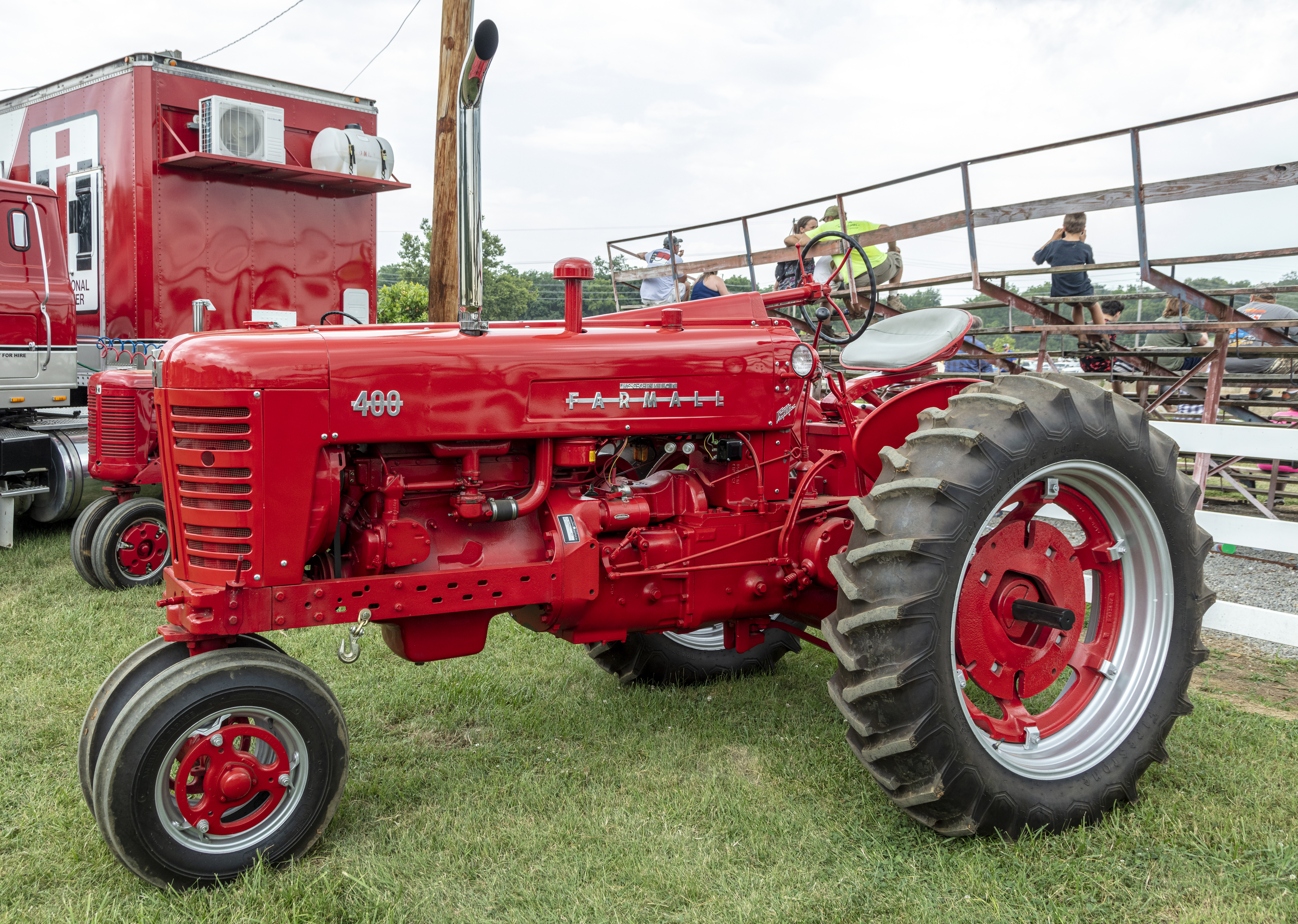
- Farmall 400
- Type: Row-crop agricultural tractor
- Manufacturer: International Harvester
- Production: 1954-1956
- Length: 141.125 inches (358.46 cm)
- Width: 107.25 inches (272.4 cm) (max)
- Height: 80.75 inches (205.1 cm) (to steering wheel)
- Weight: 6,300 pounds (2,900 kg), 9,600 pounds (4,400 kg) ballasted
- Propulsion: Rear wheels
- Engine model: International Harvester C264 (gasoline)
- Gross power: 50 horsepower (37 kW)
- PTO power: 50.78 horsepower (37.87 kW) (belt)
- Drawbar power: 45.34 horsepower (33.81 kW)
- Drawbar pull: 6,508 pounds (2,952 kg)
- Speed: 16.7 miles per hour (26.9 km/h) forward, 3.3 miles per hour (5.3 km/h) reverse
- NTTL test: 532
- Preceded by: Farmall M
- Succeeded by: Farmall 450

The Farmall 400 replaced the Super M-TA in 1954, and was produced until 1956. It was produced with a four-cylinder 50-horsepower (37 kW) engine with a displacement of 281-cubic-inch (4,600-cubic-centimetre), powering a 10 forward gear and 2 reverse gear torque amplifier transmission. Models were produced for gasoline, diesel and liquefied petroleum gas fuels. Variants included the W-400, with a wide front wheel placement, and the 400 Hi-Clear hiboy model. Total production was 40,957 at Rock Island, Illinois. The 400 was briefly succeeded by the Farmall 450, and then the Farmall 560.

== Farmall 450 ==
The Farmall 450 replaced the 400 in 1956, and was produced until 1958. The 450 had similar style updates to the corresponding 300/350 upgrades to the H line, and a larger 281-cubic-inch (4,600-cubic-centimetre) gasoline engine. Diesel and LPG models were produced. The McCormick-Deering Farmall B-450 was produced in the United Kingdom from 1958 to 1970, mainly with a wide front axle. About 39,000 450s were produced in the United States.

== Comparable products ==
Comparable products to the M include the Case DC and the John Deere A. Similar offerings to the Super M include the Oliver 77 and the Fordson Major D. The Oliver Super 88, John Deere 70 and Massey 444 were similar to the 400.

== See also ==
- McCormick-Deering W-6
