= John Deere tractors =

Vehicles made by the John Deere company

Deere & Company, the firm founded by John Deere, began to expand its range of John Deere equipment to include the tractor business in 1876. The Deere company briefly experimented with building its own tractor models, the most successful of which was the Dain all-wheel drive.

== Foundation to 1948 ==
=== Dain all-wheel drive ===
The Dain all-wheel drive was the first tractor produced by John Deere, and had only a single rear wheel. In 1911, Deere purchased the Dain Manufacturing Company of Ottumwa, Iowa. The next year, Deere decided to design its own tractor, and Dain founder, Joseph Dain Sr., was directed to design that tractor. After several prototypes, the design was finalized in 1917, and 100 production units were ordered. By 1919 when that production run was complete, Deere had purchased the Waterloo Boy Company. Although the Dain AWD was ahead of its time, with features such as a shift-on-the-fly transmission, Deere halted production in late 1919, partly because the cost of the Dain tractor was double that of the Waterloo Boy, and partly because of the death of Dain Sr.

=== Waterloo Boy ===
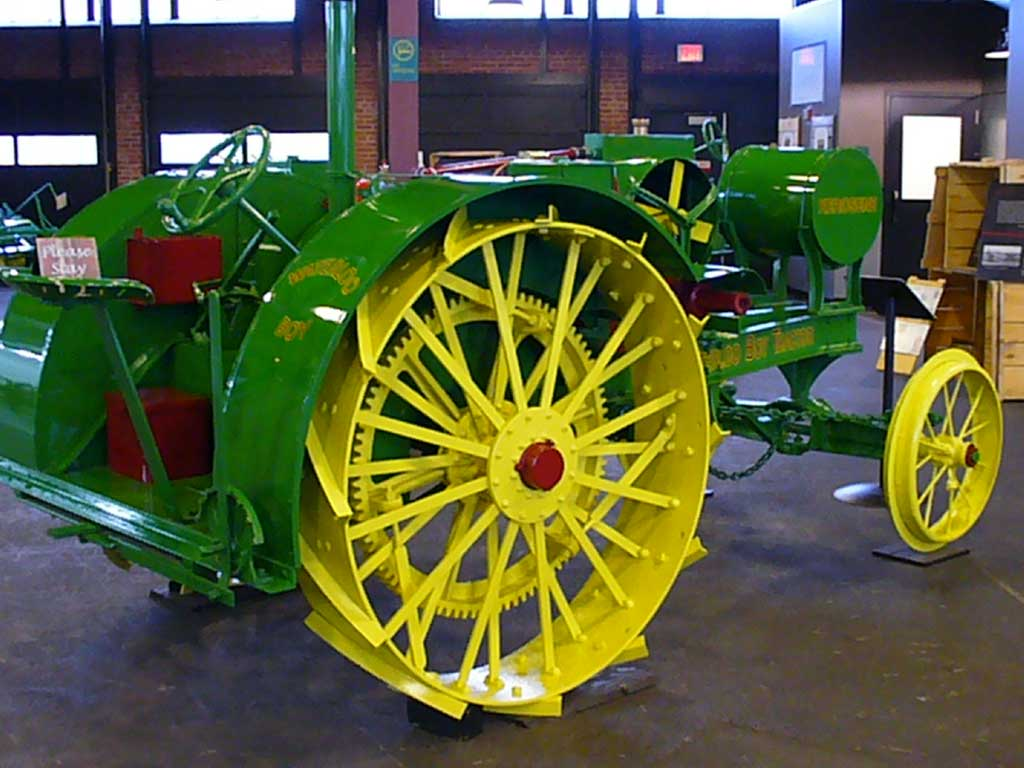
Waterloo Boy tractor

The predecessor of the Waterloo Boy came about in 1892. It was made by thresher-man John Froelich. It is called the "Froelich tractor". In March 1918, Deere & Company decided to continue its foray into the tractor business by purchasing the Waterloo Gasoline Engine Company which manufactured the popular Waterloo Boy tractor at its facilities in Waterloo, Iowa.

Deere & Company continued to sell tractors under the Waterloo Boy name until 1923.

=== Model D (Spoker Model D) ===
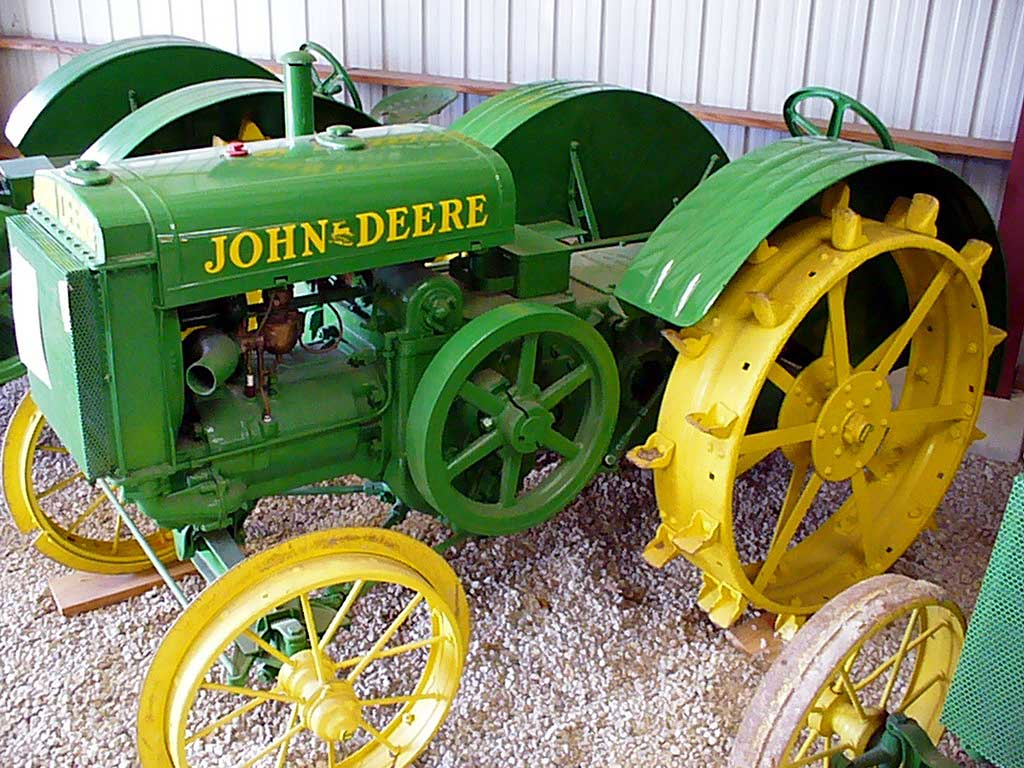
John Deere Model D tractor

Despite a rather severe farm economy depression at the time, Deere & Company management decided to build the Model D prototype in 1923, designed by Muir L. Frey (father of Ford Mustang designer Donald N. Frey). The Deere Model D was produced from March 1, 1923, to July 3, 1953, the longest production span of all the two-cylinder John Deere tractors. Over 160,000 were made.

The first Model D rode on steel wheels with a 6.5 in × 7 in (170 mm × 180 mm) (later 6.75 in × 7 in (171 mm × 178 mm)) cylinder bore and stroke of the two-cylinder hand-cranked engine rated 15 to 27 hp (11 to 20 kW). It was not, however, the first tractor to bear the Deere name; as a number of Deere experimental tractors, and the John Deere Dain all-wheel drive tractor (of which approximately 100 were produced during 1918 and 1919) had all carried the Deere name before the Model D.

By 1925, Deere & Company realized the standard Model D did not meet customers' needs for industrial applications. Steel wheels were not suitable for hard surfaces, and the gearing was too slow for safe road speeds. Solid rubber tires were added, and engineers fitted a 28 tooth sprocket to the final drive, giving a road speed of 4 mph (6 km/h). The company replaced the 465 cu in (7.6 L) two-cylinder engine with a 501 cu in (8.2 L). In 1926, Deere & Company advertised the model as the "John Deere industrial tractor", with 40 in × 8 in (1,016 mm × 203 mm) rear wheels and 24 in × 3.5 in (610 mm × 89 mm) fronts with solid tires. This became known as the "DI". Options also included wheel weights.

=== GP tractor ===
On June 20, 1928, the model designation was changed from "C" to "GP", to avoid confusion with the "D" when dealers were phoning in orders to the factory. "GP" stands for "general purpose". This new model GP had the same horsepower, engine displacement, weight, and three-speed transmission as the model C. The GP's first serial number was 200211. In 1930, the GP was updated with a 25 hp (19 kW), 339 cu in (5.6 L) engine.

The John Deere Model GP was built in five distinct versions through the course of its production:

- The standard-front GP, or John Deere standard, built from March 1928 to February 1935
- The John Deere two-wheel tricycle-front GP, or GP-tricycle, of which twenty-three units were built between August 1928 and April 1929
- The John Deere GP wide-tread, or GPWT, built from November 1929 to November 1933
- The John Deere GP wide-tread Series P, a GPWT with narrowed rear tread width designed to suit potato rows, built between January and August 1930
- The John Deere general purpose orchard tractor, or "GPO", from April 1931 to April 1935. This tractor had specialized shielding for groves and orchards and around low-hanging branches. Some GPOs were fitted with crawler undercarriages from the Lindeman Brothers in Yakima, Washington. These are commonly known as "GPO Lindemans".

The John Deere Model A came off the assembly line in April 1934. The tractor was 25 hp (19 kW), was 309 cu in (5.1 L), and had a four-speed transmission. There were eight different model A variations. Some of these were tricycle, hi-crop, orchard, single front tire, and industrial models. The tricycle wheel design, patterned after that of the Farmall tractor, reduced steering effort, and greatly increased maneuverability. The Model B was introduced in June 1934. This tractor had a shorter frame than the Model A, but it was eventually lengthened so it could use some of the same equipment that the larger models A and G used. There were also eight different Model B tractor variations, the same as the larger Model A.

The much larger G model arrived in 1937. It was fitted with a 36 hp (27 kW), 425 cu in (7.0 L) engine, and a four-speed transmission. Deere & Company publicized the G as a three-plow tractor, and it was built until 1941, when the GM (G, modernized) replaced it. The GM model was made from 1942 to 1947. The drawbar power increased to 38 hp (28 kW), and a new six-speed transmission was also added. The G model got a restyled front at this point, as did the other John Deere tractor models. The GM had electric starting and lighting added to its options. During its production time, the G tractor was available as a hi-crop, single front wheel, and styled.

=== Un-styled row crop tractors ===
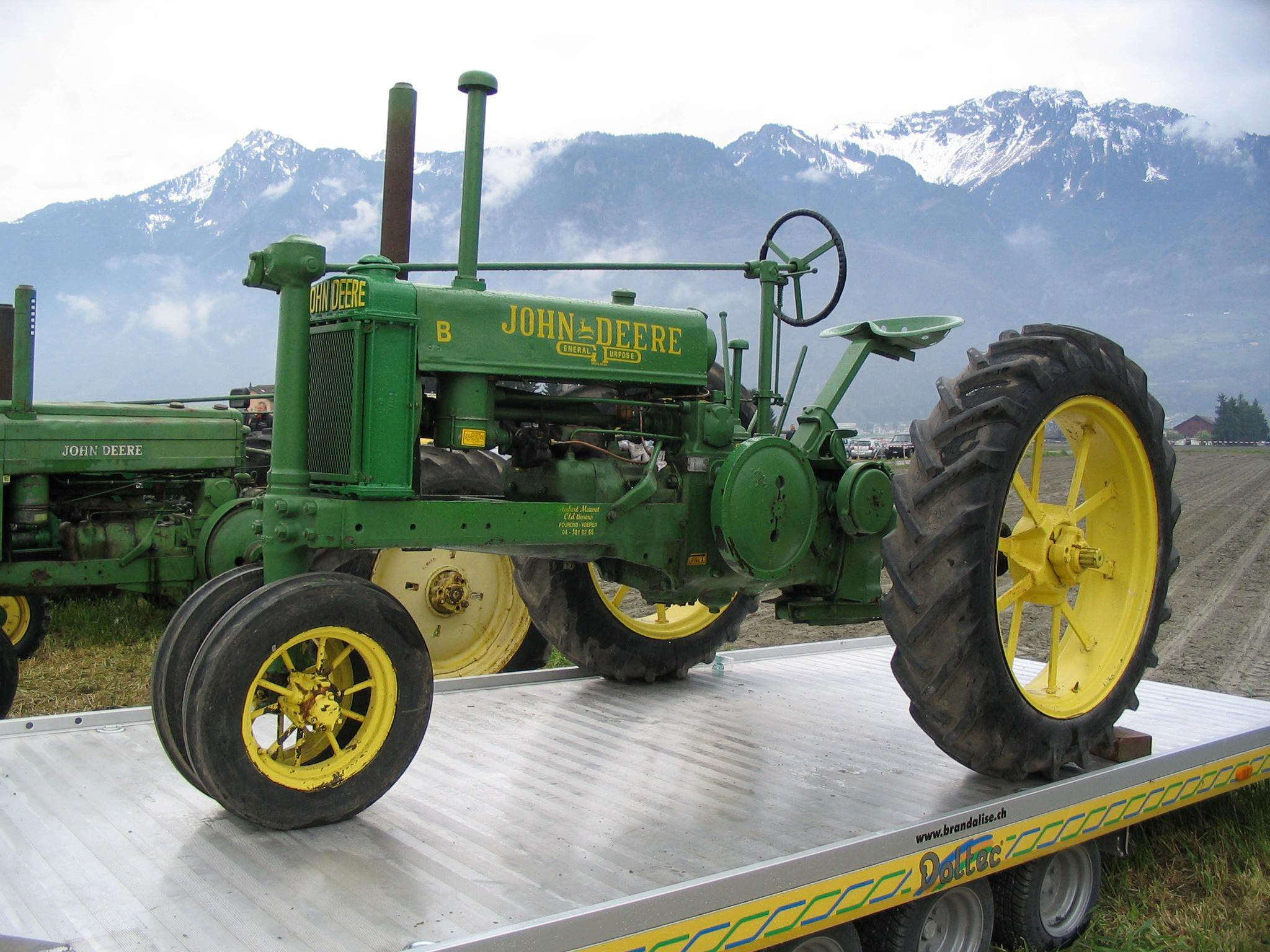
John Deere Model B tractor

Deere & Company made their first un-styled row crop tractor in 1929, to compete with the Farmall. It was a modified GP tractor, with adjustable rear axle track (distance between wheels on the same axle), and a narrow front end. In 1933, Deere & Company started experimenting with what would come to be known as the Model A. The new Model A went into production in 1934. The A launched John Deere into the row crop farming market. The A was by far the most popular two-cylinder tractor that Deere & Company produced. The next year the Model B was introduced. It was one third smaller than the A, which made it ideal for smaller farms. A few years later, the Model G was introduced in 1937. It remained un-styled for several more years than the A and B. The un-styled tractors launched Deere & Company into the row crop farming market which they are still a major part of today. The model designation was actually labeled on the support between the seat and the platform. Any other location is an incorrect restoration. This continued onto the styled tractors until 1947.

The Deere & Company very nearly went bankrupt in the Great Depression. Only a large order of tractors for the Soviet Union kept the company going.

- John Deere A 1934-1939
- John Deere B 1935-1939
- John Deere D 1923-1939
- John Deere G 1937-1941

=== Streamlined look ===
In 1937, John Deere hired well known industrial designer Henry Dreyfuss from New York City to re-style Deere & Company's agricultural equipment, especially its tractors. In the fall of 1937, a John Deere tractor engineer was sent to New York to ask Dreyfuss to redesign the tractors. Legend has it that Dreyfuss was so intrigued by the project, that he took a train to Waterloo that very night. Dreyfuss learned to operate the tractors, and worked with them in the field to gain firsthand knowledge of the changes that needed to be made. The first two letter series tractors (the A and B) were the first to receive the new modern styling, and other models were added later. The Dreyfuss styling was intended to help Deere & Company compete with the forthcoming Farmall "letter series" of tractors, which, along with the Ford-Ferguson, were John Deere's largest competition at this time. Dreyfuss and the Waterloo engineers perfected the styled design that was used on all John Deere tractors, with only minor changes through to 1959.

The 1930s and 1940s saw a large number of different John Deere models emerge, as small farmer.s emerging from their Depression troubles increasingly turned from horses to tractors. Deere & Company's GM model was introduced in 1942, and was made until 1947. Engine power was increased to 38 hp (28 kW), and a new six-speed transmission was also added. The G model got a restyled front at this point, as did the other John Deere tractors models. The GM had electric start and lights added to its options. During its production time, the G tractor was available in hi-crop and single front wheel versions. The G was restyled in 1941, but did not start to roll off the assembly line until early 1942. Like the smaller A and B tractors, the G model had the six-speed transmission added to it. In 1946, the 1946 model "D" had a 501 cu in (8.2 L) engine, which was enormous for the day. Two new additions to the tractor line, the M and R models, were also added.

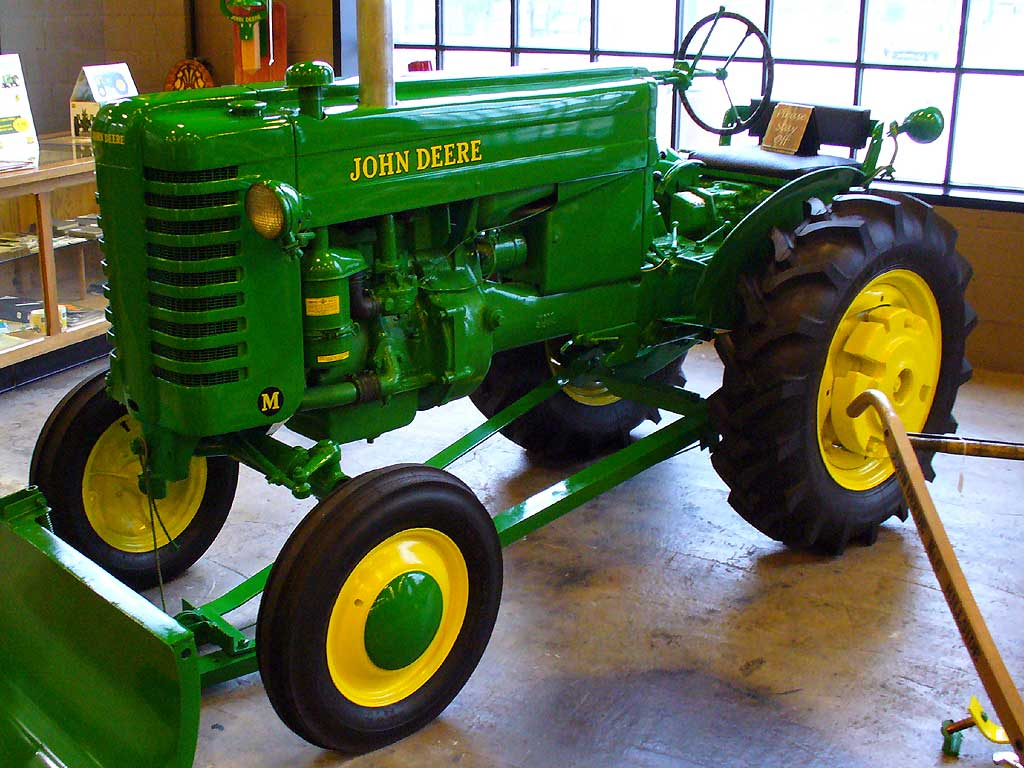
John Deere Model M tractor

After the models A and B got new styling, both tractors were given six-speed transmissions in late 1940. The A was 29 hp (22 kW) out of a 321 cu in (5.3 L) engine, while the smaller B was both 18 and 23 hp (13 and 17 kW), reflecting the earlier and later updates between 1938 and 1946. The 14.84 Model H was given the Dreyfuss look from the time it was introduced in 1938. The H broke a fuel economy record when it was tested in Nebraska. This tractor also had three variations that came out in 1940–1941. The H tractor was 14.84 hp (11.07 kW) out of a 90 cu in (1.5 L) engine, and had a three-speed transmission. 1947, all models operator platforms were updated with, a cushioned seat, new steering column, lights, battery, and electric starting which resulted in an inclosed flywheel.

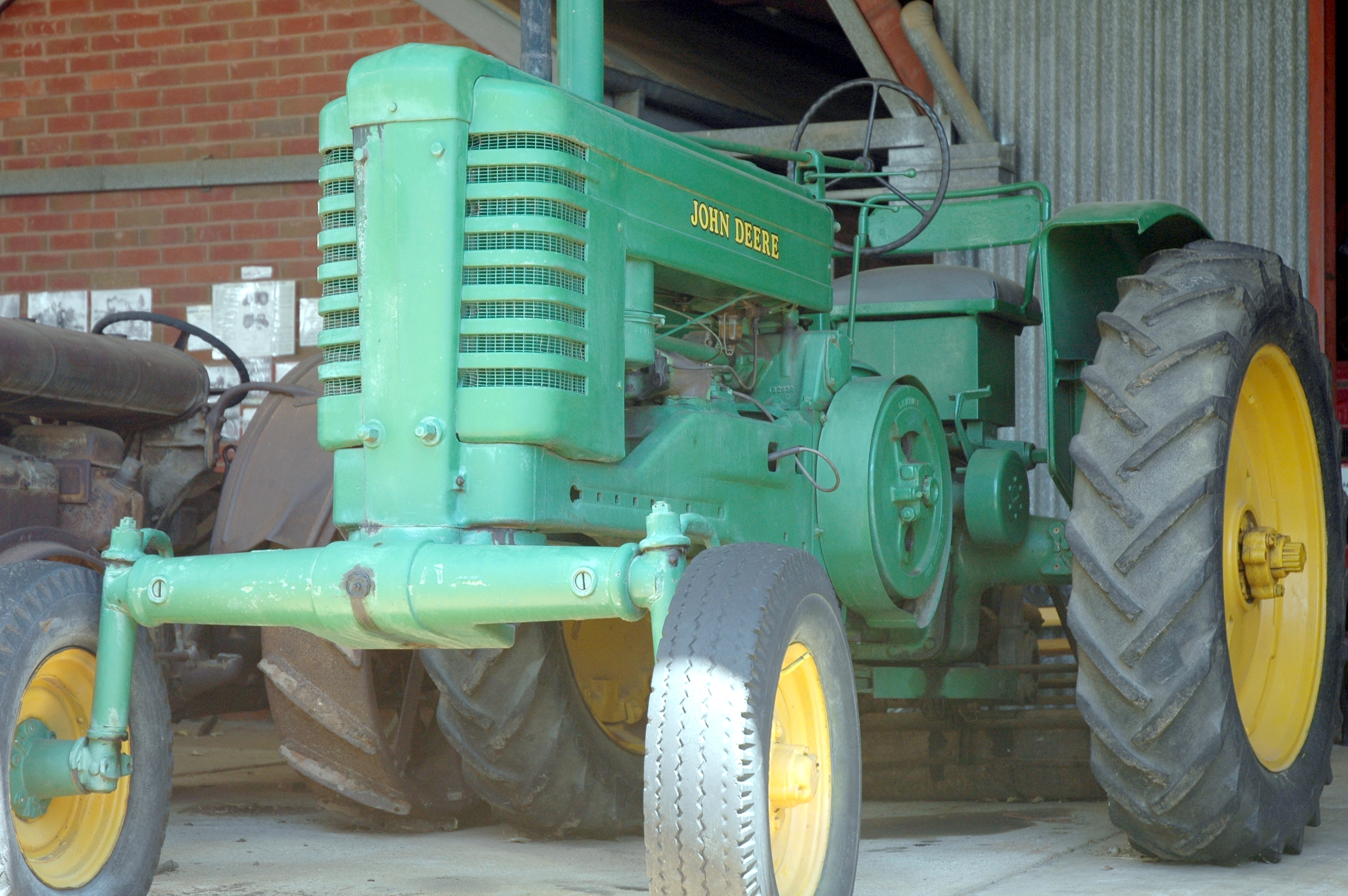
Model AW (1947-52, late styled) in original condition, Gulgong museum, NSW Australia

In 1939, the restyled Model D appeared. The D was a 42 hp (31 kW) tractor, and weighed 5,300 lb (2,400 kg). Options available on this tractor included electric lighting and starting. In August 1940, Deere & Company introduced the new model LA which was followed by the model LI. The LA had a 77 cu in (1.3 L) engine with 14 hp (10 kW) belt horsepower. The John Deere G tractor was restyled in 1941, but did not start to roll off the assembly line until early 1942. Like the smaller A and B tractors, the G model also had the six-speed transmission, but also featured electric lights and electric start.

In 1947, Deere & Company opened a new tractor factory in Dubuque, Iowa, built to produce the John Deere Model M. The M was created to address the increasing demand for small tractors, and compete with the increasingly popular Ford, and the smaller Farmall tractor models. The M was the second John Deere tractor to use a vertical two-cylinder engine, after the LA, but the first to with a square bore to stroke ratio of 4.0 in × 4.0 in (102 mm × 102 mm) 100.5 cu in (1.6 L) with a high row crop.

- John Deere A 1939-1952
- John Deere B 1939-1952
- John Deere H 1938-1947
- John Deere D 1939-1953
- John Deere G 1942-19
- John Deere LA 1940-1947
- John Deere M 1947-1953

== 1949–1959: diesels and post World War II production ==
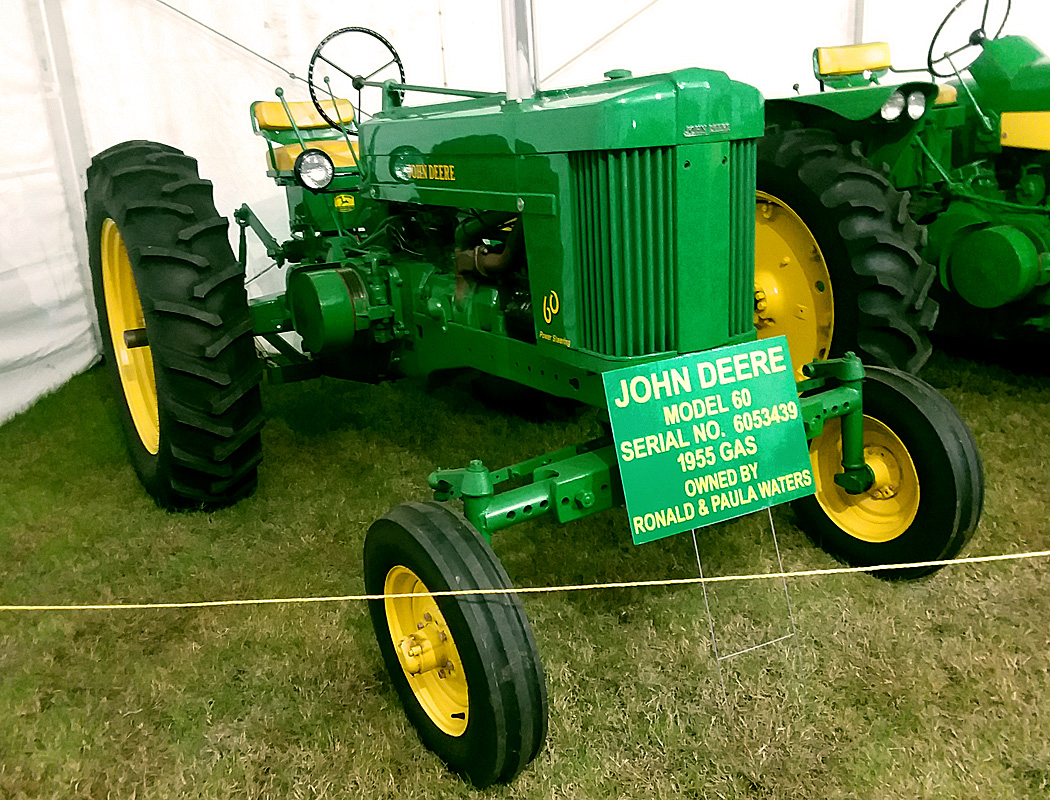
John Deere Model 60 (1955)

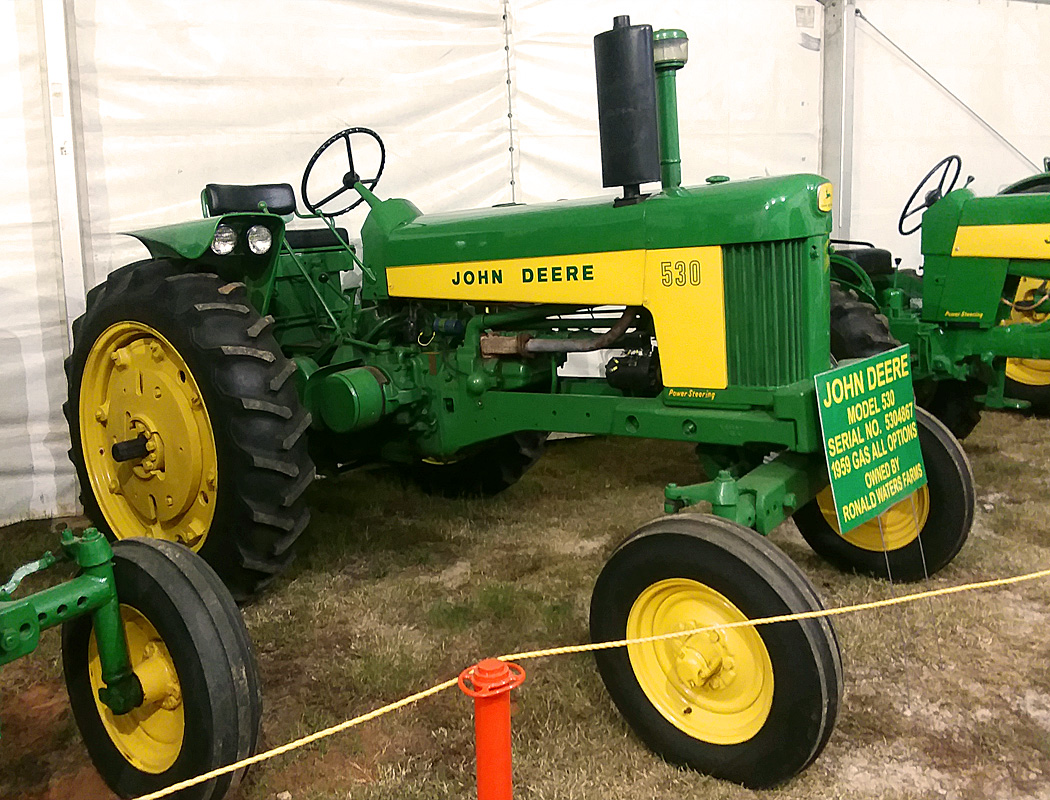
John Deere Model 530 (1959)

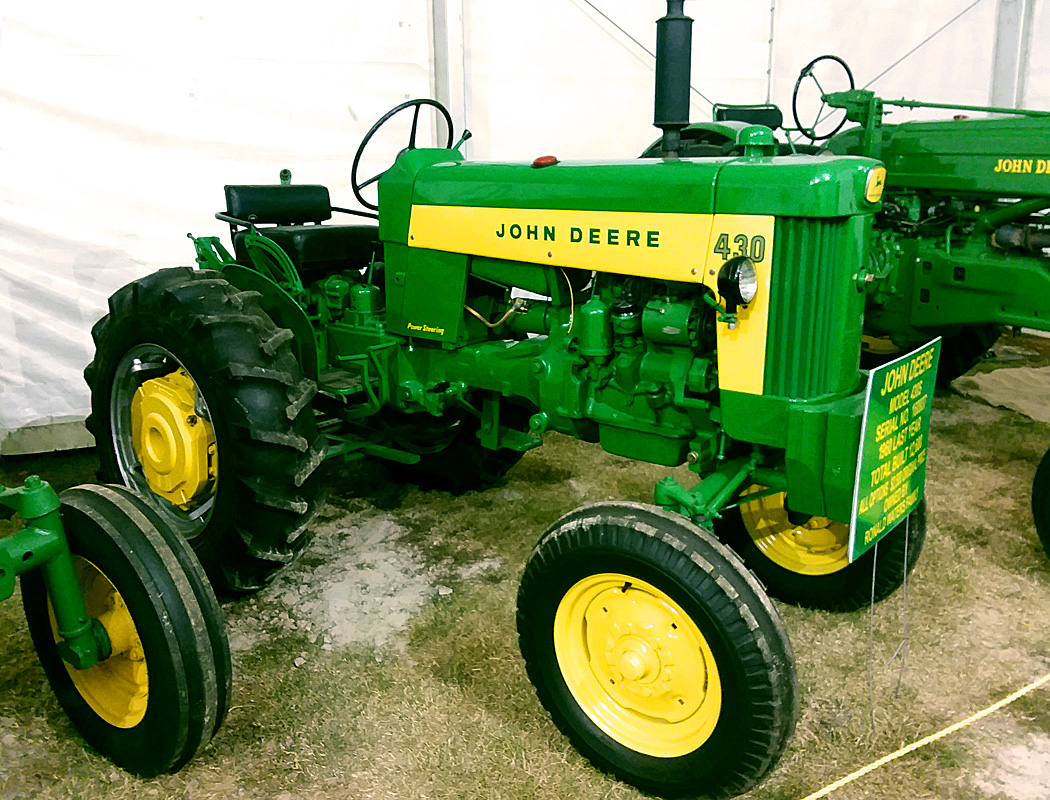
John Deere Model 430S (circa 1960)

After years of testing, Deere & Company released its first proper diesel engined tractor in 1949, the Model R. The R was also the first John Deere tractor with a live independent power take-off (PTO) equipped with its own clutch. The R also incorporated live hydraulics. PowrTrol, as it was known, provided the operator the ability to lift equipment by the pull of a lever. A pump powered by the PTO clutch provided 1,800 psi (12 MPa) of hydraulic pressure to a lever controlled valve. At 45 hp (34 kW) at the drawbar and 50 hp (37 kW) at the belt, it was the most fuel-efficient tractor available at the time, and this combination of features resulted in over 21,000 being built. The Model R had a shipping weight of 7,670 lb (3,480 kg). The R was equipped with two engines. The main engine is a two-cylinder, four-stroke, naturally aspirated 416 cu in (6.8 L) (5.75 by 8.00 in (146 by 203 mm) bore and stroke), direct injected diesel engine, with a 16:1 compression ratio. The starting engine is also a John Deere two-cylinder, 26 cu in (0.43 L) horizontally opposed gasoline engine. The starting or "pony" engine is electrically started by a six-volt electrical system, and is used to crank the main diesel engine. Testing results with various electrical starting systems for the diesel engine proved to be too bulky, requiring a 24- or 32-volt system. The design of the pony starter Model Rs allowed for hot exhaust gasses to preheat the intake air for the diesel engine, and a common liquid cooling system allowed the pony engine to warm the diesel engine block and head. This provided sufficient cold weather starting aids for the diesel engine that it would reliably run in sub-zero conditions. The R did have several teething problems, as this was Deere & Company's first production diesel engined tractor. Available as a standard tractor only, it did not have an adjustable front axle, nor did it have a three-point hitch. The engine was mainly an up-scaled gasoline engine from the Model D. The use of a thermosiphon cooling system, and the lack of a three-point bearing crankshaft proved inadequate for diesel engine compression ratios. The R was prone to overheating, and cracking the cylinder head. The lack of a center main bearing in the crankshaft allowed the crankshaft to flex when used as a stationary power-plant on the belt; this would lead to its failure. The live PTO was directed through two 45° bevel gears that proved too small to durably transmit the full torque of the engine. The tractor was fully serviceable at pulling larger equipment efficiently on large area wheat-land farms.

During the 1950s, the R saw a series of upgrades in the models 80, 820, and 830. The 80 was produced for two years, and 3,500 were produced. It had new features, including power steering and dual hydraulics. It developed 68 hp (51 kW) and weighed 8,100 lb (3,700 kg). The 80 also corrected the other design flaws within the R, such as using a water pump and radiator pressure cap, and the addition of a center crankshaft main bearing.

The 820 and 830 were similar overall, but also differed in their sheet metal exteriors, fuel tank designs, and color schemes. The 720, was basically the same as the 70, except for the model number, and that the sides of the hood are painted John Deere yellow. The 720 was upgraded to the 730 for 1959. The 730 featured more contoured bodywork than the 720, and came with more ergonomic features for the operator. Although the 730 had a short production run, it became one of Deere & Company's most popular models. The 730 also featured power steering and 24-volt electric starter motor, instead of the V4 pony starter engine. The 730 was available in diesel, gasoline, and LPG, as well as in row crop tricycle, row crop wide front, standard tread, and hi crop wide front formats. The 730 is very popular with tractor pulling enthusiasts, because of its weight, power, and slow speed. The 730 was a 59 hp (44 kW) tractor at the belt and 54 hp (40 kW) at the drawbar.

After making more than 1 1/4 million two-cylinder tractors, Deere & Company switched to four- and six-cylinder engines. Announcement of the change came after seven years of development, and forty million dollars in retooling.

In October 1959, the company showcased a new large 215 hp (160 kW) four-wheel drive (4WD), called the 8010, on the Robert Ottilie Seed Farm north of Marshalltown, Iowa. It was shown during the largest farming field days event held in Iowa up to that time. Only one hundred 8010s were built, and 99 of those were rebuilt at the factory, and re-released as 8020s in 1960.

== 1960s: New generation of power ==
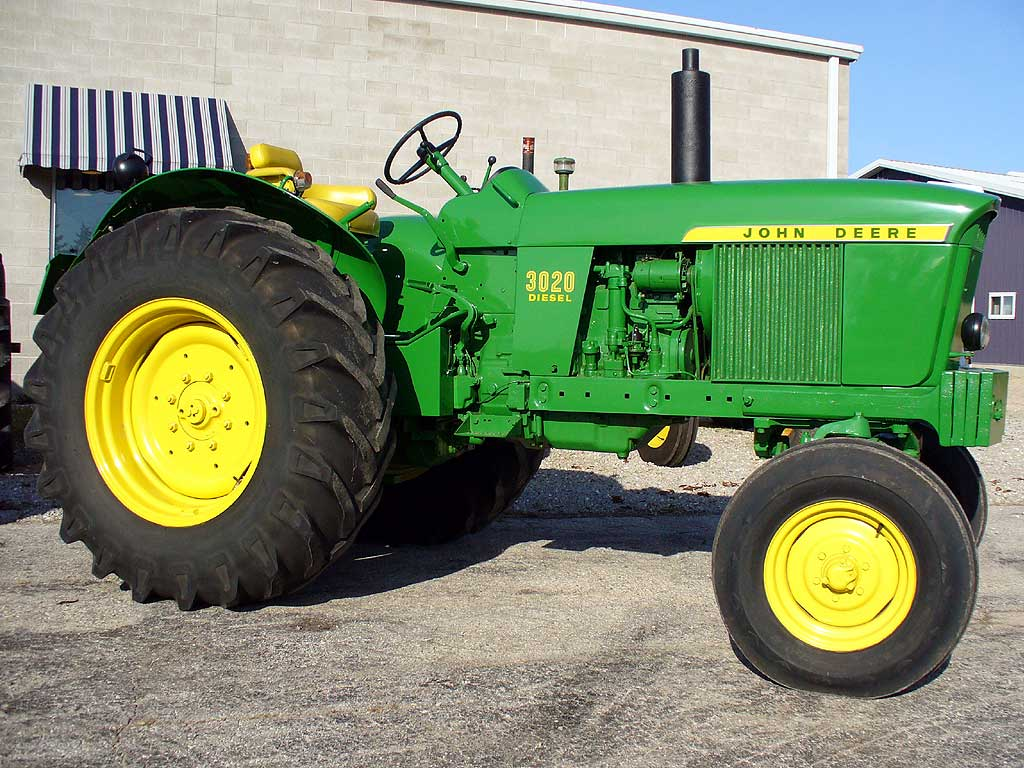
John Deere 3020

To introduce its new generation tractors to all of its dealers in a single day, Deere & Company chartered airplanes to fly more than 5,000 people to Dallas, Texas, on August 30, 1960. Deere & Company put their new 1961 tractors on display outside the Cotton Bowl, and inside Neiman Marcus. The day marked the release of a revolutionary line of farm tractors, with sleek new styling by Henry Dreyfuss, that would soon become the standard by which all other farm tractors would be measured. These tractors were the 1010, 2010, 3010 and 4010.

These were soon followed by the model 5010 Standard introduced for 1962. The 5010 was the first two-wheel drive to exceed 100 hp (75 kW) at the PTO and drawbar. Designed for the western wheat-lands, the 5000 series was never available as a row crop model. For 1964, the 3010 and 4010 were replaced by the 3020 and 4020, both of which were offered beginning in 1965 with a powershift transmission designed by a former Ford employee. The 4020 is one of the most popular tractors Deere & Company has ever made. The year 1965 brought the 5020 standard, which was the industry's most powerful two-wheel-drive model, along with the 1020, 2020, and 54 hp (40 kW) model 2510. By 1966, the 4020 accounted for 48% of all John Deere tractor sales. Also that year, a row crop version of the 5020 was introduced.

In the late 1960s, Deere & Company pioneered the roll-over protection structure to protect the driver from injury in the event of a tractor roll-over. John Deere invited the competition to view a demonstration of its new Roll-Guard. Deere recommended that all tractors include this safety feature, and offered to share its design and test data with its competitors. Deere & Company also encouraged farmers to retro-fit their tractors with this safety feature, and offered roll guards at cost to farmers who wished to install them on their older new generation tractors.

In 1968, nine new models appeared: the 820, 920, 1120, 1520, 2120, 2520, 4000, 4520, WA-14, and WA-17. The WA-14 and WA-17 were articulated four-wheel-drive tractors, built by Wagner under a no compete clause, which extended to 5 years after deere dropped the line. thus resulting in wagner going bankrupt. The 4520 was Deere & Company's first turbocharged tractor. The 3020 and 4020 were updated with new features, and the 5020 model had a drawbar power increase to an industry leading 141 hp (105 kW). The 4000 was a high Power-to-weight tractor, designed to be a "runner" rather than a "lugger". The 4000 used the same engine as the popular 4020, but weighed almost 1,000 lb (450 kg) less. According to Deere & Company, the 4000 could, in the same amount of time, pull a four-bottom plow fast enough to cover the same area as a 4020 pulling a five-bottom plow. The John Deere 4000 was also an economy tractor, providing the same horsepower as the 4020, with fewer features and smaller rear axles.

== 1970s: Generation II and new iron horses ==
During the 1970s, Deere & Company introduced 36 new models. In 1972, John Deere introduced the Generation II tractors. Generation II was characterized by the optional Sound-Guard body. This innovative cab was isolated from the tractor by large rubber bushings, which dampened vibrations, and the interior was insulated with foam to reduce noise, and protect the operator from extreme temperatures outside. A foam pad on the firewall and sheets of lead under the dash greatly reduced engine noise inside the cab. The Sound-Guard body also featured a rounded front windshield with an integrated door. The door post was in line with the exhaust and air intake pipes, which route through the hood for the best forward visibility possible. Fully integrated heating and air conditioning was standard equipment, and it also featured windshield wipers, a dome light, a red interior lamp to illuminate the gear shift levers and hydraulic controls during nighttime operation, and speakers for an optional AM/FM radio, which many farmers added because they found the cab so quiet they could actually hear it. When it was introduced, it was the quietest tractor cab in the industry, and a vast improvement over the aftermarket cabs that Deere & Company had previously retrofitted to its tractors.

The Generation II tractors also offered other innovative features not available on previous John Deere models, such as a Quad-Range transmission that improved on Deere's proven Synchro-Range transmission, by adding a high and low gears in each range, and Deere's new Perma-Clutch; a wet clutch that would last much longer, virtually the life of the tractor.

- 1970, the 116 hp (87 kW) 4320, the 135 hp (101 kW) 4620, and 146 hp (109 kW) 7020 were introduced;
- 1970 in Argentina, introduced the local-made 20 series, with the 1420, 2420, 3420, and 4420;
- 1971, the 60 hp (45 kW) 2030, the 175 hp (130 kW) 6030, and 7520 (also at 175 hp (130 kW)) were added;
- 1972, on Saturday August 19, John Deere dealers held an open house to usher in their Generation II tractors. The four new tractors were the 80 hp (60 kW) 4030, 100 hp (75 kW) 4230, 125 hp (93 kW) 4430 and 150 hp (110 kW) 4630; there were billed as "Sound Idea" tractors because of their innovative Sound-Guard Body operators enclosure;
- 1973 would see the final New Generation utility tractors launched; the 35 hp (26 kW) 830, 45 hp (34 kW) 1530, and 70 hp (52 kW) 2630;
- 1974, the first two models in the Generation II four-wheel drive range appeared in 1974 in the 215 hp (160 kW) 8430 and 275 hp (205 kW) 8630;
- 1975 in Argentina, the 30 series was launched with the 2330, 2530, 2730, 3330, 3530, and 4530;
- 1975, the initial Generation II utility tractors were introduced; these were the 40 hp (30 kW) 2040, 50 hp (37 kW) 2240, 60 hp (45 kW) 2440, and 70 hp (52 kW) 2640;
- In late 1976, a new 80 hp (60 kW) addition as the 2840;
- 1977 saw what came to be known as "Seven in '77"; Deere & Company's first compact diesels, the John Deere "Task Master" tractors, were introduced in the 22 hp (16 kW) 850 and 27 hp (20 kW) 950; other than that, the big news was what Deere & Company called The New Iron Horses, with more horses and more iron; these were the 90 hp (67 kW) 4040, 110 hp (82 kW) 4240, 130 hp (97 kW) 4440, 156 hp (116 kW) 4640, and the 180 hp (130 kW) 4840, which replaced the 4630. The Iron Horses featured an improved Sound-Guard Body with more sound proofing, hydraulic seat suspension, and Deere's Personal Posture seat as standard equipment. The 4240, 4440, 4640, and 4840 featured a new 466 cu in (7.6 L) engine;
- 1978 brought the 215 hp (160 kW) 8440 and 275 hp (205 kW) 8640 articulated four wheel drive tractors;
- 1979, late in the year, a third diesel compact was added, the 33 hp (25 kW) 1050; it had a turbo diesel engine which was unique in its class. Five new utility tractors were added at the same time, the 41 hp (31 kW) 2040, 50 hp (37 kW) 2240, 60 hp (45 kW) 2440, 70 hp (52 kW) 2640, and 81 hp (60 kW) 2940; these five new models had a black and yellow "tiger stripe" on both sides of the hood;
- 1979 was the first year for the 40 series in Argentina, because the first model are the John Deere 3440, and continues in the 1980s with the 2140, 3140 / 3140 DT, 3540.

== 1980s ==
Deere & Company introduced at least 38 new tractors during the 1980s, during a time when over six other competitors merged, were sold, or went out of business altogether:

- Two new small compact diesel tractors were added in 1981; these were the PTO 14.5 hp (10.8 kW) 650 and PTO 18 hp (13 kW) 750. Three new 4WDs came to market in the fall of 1981; these were the 225 hp (168 kW) 8450, 290 hp (220 kW) 8650, and big 370 hp (280 kW) 8850; the 8850 came with the company's biggest engine, the 955 cu in (15.6 L) V8 engine;
- Besides the 8850, the John Deere 844 wheel loader and 990 hydraulic excavator were the only other John Deere products to get this V8 engine; also according to Wayne Broehl's 1984 book, about the John Deere's Company, a larger 4WD tractor than the 8850 was supposed to appear but never did;
- In 1982, eleven new 50 series tractors from 40 hp (30 kW) up to 192.99 hp (143.91 kW) debuted. The 40 hp (30 kW) 1250, 45 hp (34 kW) 2150, 55 hp (41 kW) 2350, 65 hp (48 kW) 2550, 75 hp (56 kW) 2750, 85 hp (63 kW) 2950, 100 hp (75 kW) 4050, 120 hp (89 kW) 4250, 140 hp (100 kW) 4450, 165 hp (123 kW) 4650, and 192.99 hp (143.91 kW) 4850. From the 2150 to the 4850 got another industry leading innovation, in the use of castor action mechanical front-wheel drive, which provided 20 percent more pulling power. Like the front tires of a motor grader, this castor action Mechanical Front Wheel Drive (MFWD) had the front tires lean to give a shorter turning radius. John Deere's 50 Series tractors also offered a new power shift transmission, with 15 operating speeds. When tested in Nebraska, the 4850 was the most fuel efficient tractor ever tested over 60 hp (45 kW).;
- The following year, 1983 brought in the final two 50 Series tractors namely the 50 hp (37 kW) 1450 and 60 hp (45 kW) 1650. When tested in Nebraska, the 1650 proved to be the most fuel efficient tractor ever tested. A 4020 shadow, namely the 95 hp (71 kW) 3150 came about in 1985. This was the first John Deere row crop tractor to have MFWD as standard equipment.;
- Three new diesel compacts came to light in 1986; these were the 16 hp (12 kW) 655, 20 hp (15 kW) 755, 24 hp (18 kW) 855 and 900HC. The 900HC was offset like the 2-cylinder M, and was for niche markets. The 655, 755, and 855 all had a hydrostatic drive transmission. The 2355, 2555, 2755, and 2955 were featured as price fighter (economy) tractors in 1986 with less features.;
- The following year, 1987 Deere & Company brought out six new models in the 45 hp (34 kW) 2155, 55 hp (41 kW) 2355, 65 hp (48 kW) 2555, 75 hp (56 kW) 2755, 85 hp (63 kW) 2955, and 96 hp (72 kW) 3155;
- In October 1988, at the dealer meeting in Denver, Colorado, the new 235 hp (175 kW) 8560, 300 hp (220 kW) 8760, and 370 hp (280 kW) 8960 were introduced;
- In early 1989, in Palm Springs, California, six new 55 Series tractors were shown to dealers; these were the 105 hp (78 kW) 4055, 120 hp (89 kW) 4255, 140 hp (100 kW) 4455, 156 hp (116 kW) 4555, 177 hp (132 kW) 4755, and 202 hp (151 kW) 4955; the 4555 was an entirely new model which was the same size as the 4640; These tractors were nearly identical to the 50 series. Small upgrades included better lighting, slightly increased hydraulic pressure and flow, a new digital instrument display, and a swivel seat.
- This year also brought the 70 Series gear driven compact diesels; these were the 18 hp (13 kW) 670, 24 hp (18 kW) 770, 28 hp (21 kW) 870, 33 hp (25 kW) 970, and 38 hp (28 kW) 1070.

== 1990s and Generation III ==
- In 1990, Deere & Company introduced a new hydrostatic compact utility tractor: the 955 with a 33 hp (25 kW) three-cylinder diesel engine.

=== 5000 series ===
In what some industry watchers were calling Generation III, the year 1991 brought a glimpse of what Deere & Company tractors of the 1990s would be like. Eight new John Deere tractors were introduced in 1991, starting with the three 5000 Series tractors. These were the 40 hp (30 kW) 5200, 50 hp (37 kW) 5300, and 60 hp (45 kW) 5400. Two new models, the 92 hp (69 kW) 3055, and 100 hp (75 kW) 3255 followed.

Deere & Company is manufacturing 5000 Series of tractors at Sanaswadi, Pune, in India; the range of products from India are listed below. Additionally, the paint schemes changed in 2007. In 2007, Deere & Company made some power rating changes in otherwise unchanged machines. The 5103 came with a black engine and driveline prior to 2007, when they began painting the engine area all green. These are referred to as black belly's or green belly's. The black belly 5103 was rated at 50 hp (37 kW), while as is listed below the green belly 5103 was rated at 40 hp (30 kW).

- 5036C – 35 hp (26 kW)
- 5041C – 41 hp (31 kW)
- 5103 Economy – 35 hp (26 kW)
- 5038D – 38 hp (28 kW)
- 5103 – 40 hp (30 kW)
- 5103S – 42 hp (31 kW)
- 5104 – 45 hp (34 kW)
- 5203S – 50 hp (37 kW)
- 5204 – 50 hp (37 kW)
- 5210 – 45 hp (34 kW)
- 5310 – 55 hp (41 kW)
- 5310 MFWD – 55 hp (41 kW)
- 5410 – 65 hp (48 kW)
- 5510 MFWD – 75 hp (56 kW)

=== 60 series ===
For 1992 model year, Deere & Company introduced the 160 hp (120 kW) 4560, the 175 hp (130 kW) 4760, and 202 hp (151 kW) 4960. They were nearly identical to the 4555, 4755, and 4955 they replaced, with the improvements being improved lighting and safety, hood free of the air intake and exhaust pipe, which was moved to the right corner post of the cab on the 60 Series tractors, and an improved cab entry step with handrail.

=== 6000 and 7000 series ===
In the fall of 1992, six totally new 6000 and 7000 Series tractors were introduced by Deere & Company; the 62 hp (46 kW) 6200, 75 hp (56 kW) 6300, 85 hp (63 kW) 6400, 110 hp (82 kW) 7600, 125 hp (93 kW) 7700, and 146 hp (109 kW) 7800. Also the cabs were completely redesigned for better visibility and operator comfort; John Deere's new cabs were a significant improvement over the Sound Guard body which had set the industry standard for two decades.

=== 70 series ===
The spring of 1993, Deere & Company introduced the four new 70 Series Power Plus 4WD models; these were the 250 hp (190 kW) 8570, 300 hp (220 kW) 8770, and a new model, the 350 hp (260 kW) 8870. And the first 400 hp (300 kW) tractor, the 8970. These tractors were equipped with an electronic power bulge that would kick in when tough field conditions were encountered. Later in the summer, the 3055 and 3255 were replaced with the 92 hp (69 kW) 7200 and 100 hp (75 kW) 7400.

=== 8000 series ===
1994 was a red letter year in tractor development for Deere & Company, because that year brought about the most revolutionary row crop tractors the industry had seen up to then. 1994 was the last year of the Sound Guard body from John Deere, with the last one built being a 2WD 4760 model. It was manufactured on 1994 May 25. This ended a 22-year run for Sound Guard tractors, that were widely regarded as the most successful tractors ever built.

- The new 8000 Series tractors were introduced with state-of-the-art features; the 160 hp (120 kW) 8100, 180 hp (130 kW) 8200, 200 hp (150 kW) 8300, and 225 hp (168 kW) 8400. One lone utility tractor, the 73 hp (54 kW) 5500 was added in the fall of 1995.

=== TEN series upgrades ===
1996 saw thirteen new tractors debuted at a big John Deere dealer meeting in New Mexico.

- First, all of the 7000 Series tractors were replaced the five 7000 TEN series tractors; these were the 95 hp (71 kW) 7210, 105 hp (78 kW) 7410, 115 hp (86 kW) 7610, 130 hp (97 kW) 7710, and 150 hp (110 kW) 7810;
- But the big news came with the 8000T Series rubber belted track tractors; there were the 8100T, 8200T, 8300T, and 8400T; these built upon the 8000 Series wheeled tractors;
- The 70 Series tractors were replaced by the four 9000 Series tractors, at 260 hp (190 kW), 310 hp (230 kW), 360 hp (270 kW), and 425 hp (317 kW); these were the 9100, 9200, 9300, and 9400;
- 1997 brought seven new tractors, three in the Advantage Series, and four in the 5000 TEN series models. The three Advantage models were the 85 hp (63 kW) 6405, 95 hp (71 kW) 6605, and 105 hp (78 kW) 7405. The 45 hp (34 kW) 5210, 55 hp (41 kW) 5310, 65 hp (48 kW) 5410, and 75 hp (56 kW) 5510 represent the 5000 TEN series tractors.;
- The spring of 1998 revealed the four 6000 TEN tractors; the 65 hp (48 kW) 6110, 72 hp (54 kW) 6210, 80 hp (60 kW) 6310, and 90 hp (67 kW) 6410. Another new addition to the long green range in 1998 was the six 4000 Series compact diesel engined tractors; these were the 20 hp (15 kW) 4100, 21.5 hp (16.0 kW) 4200, 32 hp (24 kW) 4300, 36 hp (27 kW) 4400, 39 hp (29 kW) 4500, and 43 hp (32 kW) 4600. An Advantage Series 30 hp (22 kW) 790 compact diesel engined tractor was also added.

=== T tracked versions ===
During the fall of 1998, Deere & Company had a 360 hp (270 kW) prototype 9300T track tractor at at least three farm shows. During August 1999, the company had another dealer meeting in Moline, Illinois. It was here that the 360 hp (270 kW) 9300T, and 425 hp (317 kW) 9400T were revealed to their John Deere dealers. A 115 hp (86 kW) 7510 with full four-wheel drive was added. As a result, the 7610 was uprated to 120 hp (89 kW), and 7710 up to 135 hp (101 kW). The 8000/8000T Series tractors were replaced with the 165 hp (123 kW) 8110/8110T, 185 hp (138 kW) 8210/8210T, 205 hp (153 kW) 8310/8310T, and 235 hp (175 kW) 8410/8410T. Caterpillar sued John Deere (Caterpillar, Inc. v. Deere Co.) for alleged patent infringement on the design of the track tensioning system for the 8000T/9000T tractors. Caterpillar won the initial case and John Deere appealed the decision. The United States District Court for the Northern District of Illinois issued a summary judgement on appeal, vacating the original decision.

== 2000s ==
- In the Compact utility sector, the John Deere 790 at 27 hp (20 kW), similar to the previous 770, and the 990 at 41 hp (31 kW) were introduced by Deere & Company. The 990 was a combination of the old 1050 and the previous 970. They would last until 2007, at which time John Deere re-badged them. They exist in 2012 as the 3005 (790) and the 4005 (990). In the compact and now subcompact segment, these are all that is left that is not hydrostatic.;
- The year 2000 was not an active year for new Deere & Company tractor launches, but did yield the 48 hp (36 kW) 4700. But the year 2001 produced thirty-two (32) new green-and-yellow tractors. Starting with the 40 hp (30 kW) 990 Advantage Series compact diesel tractor, this was only the beginning. Two new 5005 Series Advantage were also added; these were the 45 hp (34 kW) 5105 and 53 hp (40 kW) 5205.;
- Early in 2001, Deere & Company introduced the 5020 Series utility tractors; these were the 45 hp (34 kW) 5220, 55 hp (41 kW) 5320, 65 hp (48 kW) 5420, and 75 hp (56 kW) 5520. But the big news for Deere & Company came in August 2001, in a John Deere dealer meeting in Albuquerque, New Mexico, where twenty-four (24) new tractors from 65 to 450 hp (48 to 336 kW) were introduced; specifically, these were the 6003, 6020, 8020/8020T, 9020, and 9020T Series tractors.;
- These were the 85 hp (63 kW) 6403, 95 hp (71 kW) 6603, 65 hp (48 kW) 6120, 72 hp (54 kW) 6220, 80 hp (60 kW) 6320, 90 hp (67 kW) 6420, in the smaller 6000 Series tractors;
- In the row crop tractor, the ten models were the 170 hp (130 kW) 8120/8120T, 190 hp (140 kW) 8220/8220T, 215 hp (160 kW) 8320/8320T, 235 hp (175 kW) 8420/8420T, and 256 hp (191 kW) 8520/8520T. As has been the case since 1996, Deere & Company has been the only company to offer row crop tractors in both wheel and rubber tracks.;
- Deere & Company replaced the 9000 Series 4WD with the 280 hp (210 kW) 9120, 325 hp (242 kW) 9220, 375 hp (280 kW) 9320/9320T, 425 hp (317 kW) 9420/9420T, and the largest John Deere tractor in history up to that point, the 450 hp (340 kW) 9520/9520T. The 8020/9020 tractors have features like independent link suspension and ActiveSeat, to give the driver a more comfortable and productive day in the field.

=== 4000 TEN upgrade ===
- 2002, Deere & Company introduced nine new 4000 TEN Series tractors;
  - 1st quarter, the 20 hp (15 kW) 4110, 18 hp (13 kW) 4010, 20 hp (15 kW) 4115, 28 hp (21 kW) 4210, 32 hp (24 kW) 4310, 35 hp (26 kW) 4410, 39 hp (29 kW) 4510, 44 hp (33 kW) 4610, and 48 hp (36 kW) 4710;
  - 3rd quarter, the smaller 7020 Series tractors debuted; these went from 95 to 125 horsepower (71 to 93 kilowatts), and were the 95 horsepower (71 kilowatts) 7220, 105 hp (78 kW) 7320, 115 hp (86 kW) 7420, and 125 hp (93 kW) 7520. Also added were the 6015 Series, which were the 72 hp (54 kW) 6215, 85 hp (63 kW) 6415, 95 hp (71 kW) 6615, and 105 hp (78 kW) 6715.;
- In early 2003, an IVT transmission was added to the options for the 7710 and 7810 tractors; a new 22 hp (16 kW) 2210 compact diesel engined tractor was also added;
- 2003, in August, Deere & Company held a big John Deere dealer meeting in Columbus, Ohio; three new 5003 tractors were released, the 44 hp (33 kW) 5103, 53 hp (40 kW) 5203, and 64 hp (48 kW) 5403.

=== 500 hp models arrive ===
One thing the John Deere dealers in attendance at Columbus saw that did not appear at 'Deere.com' until March 2004 was the new 500 hp (370 kW) 9620. The 9620 came after two of Deere & Company competitors introduced 500 hp (370 kW) 4WDs.

=== 7×20 series ===
In Columbus, Ohio, Deere & Company announced the replacement of the three larger 7000 TEN tractors; namely the 140 hp (100 kW) 7720, 155 hp (116 kW) 7820, and the new 170 hp (130 kW) 7920; the 7610 was discontinued.

- 2004 brought the 36 hp (27 kW) 4120, 40 hp (30 kW) 4320, 47 hp (35 kW) 4520, and 52 hp (39 kW) 4720. October had the 5025 Series utility tractor introduced; these were the 45 hp (34 kW) 5225, 55 hp (41 kW) 5325, 65 hp (48 kW) 5425, and 75 hp (56 kW) 5525.;
- In 2005, Deere & Company introduced fifteen (15) new tractors; the first models were the 3020 Series tractors; the 29.5 hp (22.0 kW) 3120, 32.5 hp (24.2 kW) 3320, 37 hp (28 kW) 3520, and 41 hp (31 kW) 3720; also added was the PTO 18 hp (13 kW) 2305;
- In the late summer, the 9320, 9420 and 9520 were made into scraper specials to meet a niche market. The annual dealer convention was held in Fort Worth, Texas, in August 2005, where the company brought out the 8030/8030T Series row crop tractors; there were five wheeled models and three tracked models.;
- The following were introduced; the 180 hp (130 kW) 8130, 200 hp (150 kW) 8230, 225 hp (168 kW) 8330, 250 hp (190 kW) 8430, 277 hp (207 kW) 8530, 200 hp (150 kW) 8230T, 235 hp (175 kW) 8330T, and 255 hp (190 kW) 8430T; when tested in Nebraska the 8430 was tested as the most fuel efficient row crop tractor ever tested.

=== 2006 ===
The Deere & Company annual dealer meeting was held in Omaha, Nebraska; the launches included:

- The 32 hp (24 kW) 3203, and 74 hp (55 kW) 5403;
- The Omaha get together produced the smaller 6030 Premium, and the larger 7030 Series tractors;
  - 6030 Series of the 75 hp (56 kW) 6230, 85 hp (63 kW) 6330, and 95 hp (71 kW) 6430;
  - 7030 Series of the 140 hp (100 kW) 7630, 152 hp (113 kW) 7730, 165 hp (123 kW) 7830, and 180 hp (130 kW) 7930.

=== 2007 ===
In 2007, Deere & Company released thirty-two (32) new tractor models; the year began with the introduction of the 5603 and 5625, both these are 82 hp (61 kW), and are a further extension of the 5003 and 5025 Series tractors.

- A new series of 5003 tractors launched in the summer, consisting of the 38 hp (28 kW) 5103, 47 hp (35 kW) 5203, 55 hp (41 kW) 5303, and 64 hp (48 kW) 5403.

The Deere & Company big meeting was held in August 2007 in Cincinnati, Ohio; the John Deere dealers saw four new nursery and greenhouse tractors, which would not appear on the 'Deere.com' website until February 5, 2008; these would be the:

- 21 hp (16 kW) 20A, 76 hp (57 kW) 76F, 83 hp (62 kW) 85F, and 96 hp (72 kW) 100F; PTO horsepower on these four tractors are 17 hp (13 kW), 66 hp (49 kW), 73 hp (54 kW), and 83 hp (62 kW) respectively.

At the Cincinnati dealer meeting, the dealers also saw the regular 6030 / 7030, and the Premium 6030 Series tractors:

- The 75 hp (56 kW) 6230, 85 hp (63 kW) 6330, 95 hp (71 kW) 6430, 100 hp (75 kW) 7130, 110 hp (82 kW) 7230, and 125 hp (93 kW) 7330; the only difference between the two series was that the Premium Series had the 140 hp (100 kW) 7430;
- But the biggest tractors seen in this Cincinnati meeting were the 9030 Series 4WD tractors between 325 to 530 hp (242 to 395 kW): the 325 hp (242 kW) 9230, 375 hp (280 kW) 9330, 425 hp (317 kW) 9430/9430T, 475 hp (354 kW) 9530/9530T, and 530 hp (400 kW) 9630/9630T;
- The 280 hp (210 kW) 9120 was discontinued;
- The 9430, 9530, and 9630 were also available as scraper tractor models;
- The new compact 40.4 hp (30.1 kW) 4105 was in John Deere dealer lots in late December 2007.

=== 2008 ===
In early 2008, Deere & Company introduced another compact diesel engined tractor, the 27 hp (20 kW) 3005, which is essentially an updated John Deere 870. Followed by the new 31 engine PTO 23.5 hp (17.5 kW) 2720 later in the year.

On the back of the John Deere publication The Furrow (Summer 2008) is a signup for new equipment. Deere & Company had another dealer meeting in late July 2008, to introduce many new utility tractors. But the real announcement came with John Deere introducing a new worldwide numbering scheme for the entire range of compact and agricultural tractors.

==== Power ratings / model numbers ====
From the 2008 model year range, Deere & Company nomenclature on the engine power output for individual models will now be advertised in official literature and online using the metric system per the International Organization for Standardization (ISO) 97/68/EC standard for determining net rated engine drawbar power output; the SI power value will be used in the model name.

- The first digit will state size;
- The next three will state rated engine output in Metric Horsepower (PS);
- A new letter will be added (currently D, E, or M) to state specification level:
  - R being a high specification machine (like the Premium series in the 6000 and 7000 series);
  - M to denote a mid specification;
  - E/D to denote a low-specification, or "value specification", (like the 03 and 05 series in the 6000 and 5000 respectively);
- A sixth digit describes special configurations (like "T" for Tracks on the 8RT series tractors).

Example

For example, the new 3032E tractor will be a 3000 with 32 hp (24 kW) rated engine; the E is low-specification. This tractor represents the 2007 model year 3203 for its specification, not to be mistaken for the 3320 which has the same power but more features and at a higher price. Over the next few years, all tractors will get this scheme. The issue is that Deere is using rated engine power in the name, not PTO power, which is usually less.

==== 2008 models (new nomenclature) ====
In 2008, the first John Deere tractors to get the new naming scheme were the 5D, 5E, 5E Limited edition, and the 6D Series tractors. These tractors were introduced at the annual Deere & Company dealer meeting; this year's event was held in Denver, Colorado.

- 5D – range of the 45 hp (34 kW) 5045D, and 55 hp (41 kW) 5055D; the PTO power ratings are 37 hp (28 kW) and 45 hp (34 kW) respectively; the 5D tractors are only available in two-wheel drive;
- 5E – range of the 45 hp (34 kW) 5045E, 55 hp (41 kW) 5055E, 65 hp (48 kW) 5065E, and 75 hp (56 kW) 5075E; the PTO power ratings are the 37 hp (28 kW), 45 hp (34 kW), 53 hp (40 kW), and 61 hp (45 kW) respectively; the 5E Limited come with MFWD-mechanical front-wheel drive;
- 5E Limited tractors – which are the 83 hp (62 kW) 5083E, 93 hp (69 kW) 5093E, and 101 hp (75 kW) 5101E; the PTO horsepower ratings are 65 hp (48 kW), 75 hp (56 kW), and 82 hp (61 kW) respectively; the 5E tractor are available in both two-wheel drive and MFWD versions.

The biggest John Deere tractors in the new range were the 100 to 140 hp (75 to 104 kW) 6D models.

- 6D – range of the 100 hp (75 kW) 6100D, 115 hp (86 kW) 6115D, 130 hp (97 kW) 6130D, and 140 hp (100 kW) 6140D; PTO power for the four models are 82 hp (61 kW), 95 hp (71 kW), 105 hp (78 kW), and 115 hp (86 kW) respectively; the 6D is offered in two-wheel drive and MFWD versions.

According to the 'Deere.com' website, Deere & Company introduced two new diesel engined 3E Series tractors. This pair of new 3E Series tractors is on page two of The Furrow, December 2008 edition. Both new 3E models would appear in early October 2008. These would be the 31 / 25 hp (23 / 19 kW) 3032E and 37 / 30 hp (28 / 22 kW) 3038E. The 3032E is powered by a 97 cu in (1.6 L), while a 91 cu in (1.5 L) supply's the power on the 3038E. ProMagazine.com reports that this pair is for house owners who want a tractor that could take on everyday jobs, some features are: diesel engine, twin touch pedals, hydrostatic transmission, standard 4WD, optional cruise control, power steering, a power take-off (PTO) that is electronically engaged.

=== 2009 models ===
On March 17, 2009, Deere.com announced the new 152 hp (113 kW) 7530 Premium tractor.

During the week of August 13, 2009, the company had another big dealer meeting in Omaha, Nebraska, to introduce the new 8R/8RT row crop and track tractors to their dealers. On August 20, 2009, at Deere.com, a news release was posted on the 8R, 8RT, and two new 5105M specialty tractors. Six new green-and-yellow 8R row crop tractors 225 hp (168 kW) 8225R, 245 hp (183 kW) 8245R, 270 hp (200 kW) 8270R, 295 hp (220 kW) 8295R, 320 hp (240 kW) 8320R, and the 345 hp (257 kW) 8345R. PTO ratings are 181 hp (135 kW), 198 hp (148 kW), 220 hp (160 kW), 242 hp (180 kW), 263 hp (196 kW), and 284 hp (212 kW) respectively. The 8225R is the only one available as a two-wheel-drive model. Optional IVT or Powershift transmissions. In John Deere nomenclature, the first number equals size, the next three numbers are the engine horsepower, and the letter at the end stands for capability. The six tractors range from 225 to 345 hp (168 to 257 kW), with the 8345R being the most powerful row crop model on the market. Also shown to the dealers were the new 8RT rubber track tractor models. These three models are the 295 hp (220 kW) 8295RT, 320 hp (240 kW) 8320RT, and the 345 hp (257 kW) 8345RT. The T at the end stands for tracks; other than that, the numbers in the 8RT Series are the same in their 8R counterparts. PTO power for the three 8RT tractors are 239 hp (178 kW), 260 hp (190 kW), and 281 hp (210 kW) respectively.

The 8RT models had a fuel capacity of 200 US gal (760 L; 170 imp gal), and can come with a track width up to 160 in (4,100 mm). All nine 8R/8RT tractors are powered by the company's 548 cu in (9.0 L) PowerTech Plus six-cylinder diesel engine. Two other lesser known tractors were also introduced by the company, the 5105ML orchard and poultry tractors. The power is 105 hp (78 kW) engine and PTO 90 hp (67 kW). One version of the 5105ML comes configured to work in orchards and vineyards, while the other version is a low-profile tractor for work in poultry barns.

== 2010s ==
=== 2010 models ===
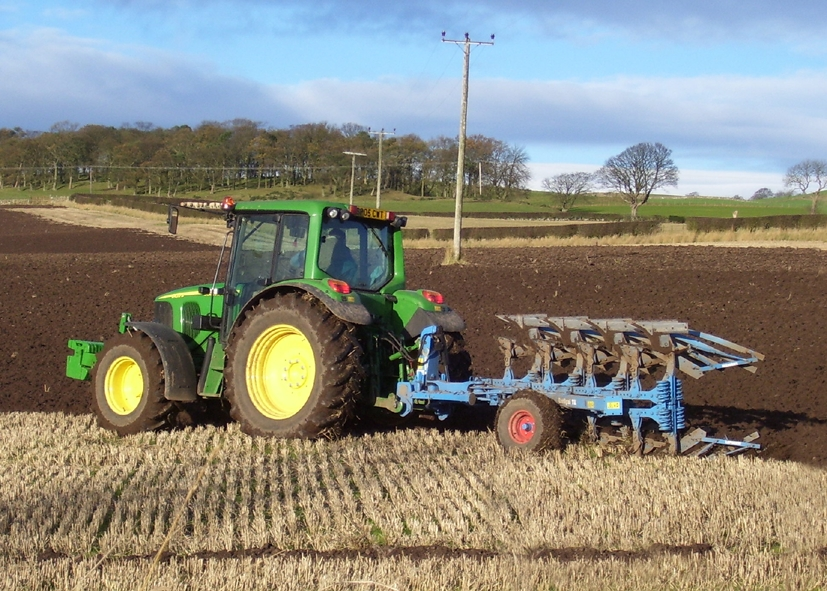

In August 2010, Deere & Company had another dealer meeting in Cincinnati, Ohio, to introduce still more tractors. This was confirmed at Deere.com on August 26, 2010, with the announcement of more new 8R/8RT Series tractors. The new models are 2011 model year tractors, with several improvements. These would be the 8235R, 8260R, 8285R, 8310R, 8335R, and 8360R wheel tractors, ranging from 235 to 360 hp (175 to 268 kW) rated engines. The PTO outputs are 192 hp (143 kW), 213 hp (159 kW), 234 hp (174 kW), 250 hp (190 kW), 276 hp (206 kW), and 296 hp (221 kW) for the six tractors. Besides the six wheel tractors, three new 8RT track tractors would also be added. There would be the 310 to 360 hp (230 to 270 kW) rated engine 8310RT, 8335RT, and the 8360RT. Power-take off horsepower is 247 hp (184 kW), 268 hp (200 kW), and 288 hp (215 kW) respectively. One of the major changes with these nine green-and-yellow tractors was the new PowerTech PSX 548 cu in (9.0 L) dual turbocharged diesel. This is an Interim Tier 4 (IT4) diesel engine.

On January 1, 2011, EPA Tier 4 regulations began, thus the new PowerTech diesel in these tractors. Despite their competitors going with SCR to counter this, John Deere uses exhaust gas recirculation (EGR). To tell these new 8R tractors apart from the earlier 2010 tractors, John Deere put new wrap-around lights up front. Also the model number has been moved close to the front just off the black grill on both sides. Another characteristic is the new large black muffler on the right corner of the cab. Other improvements engineered into these tractors are JDLink, ActiveCommand Steering (ACS), Infinitely Variable Transmission (IVT) AutoMode, GS3 CommandCenter, and the StarFire 3000 receiver.

In a 2010 October meeting in Florida, John Deere dealers were shown the new 1023E and 1026E sub compact tractors that the company announced in February 2011.

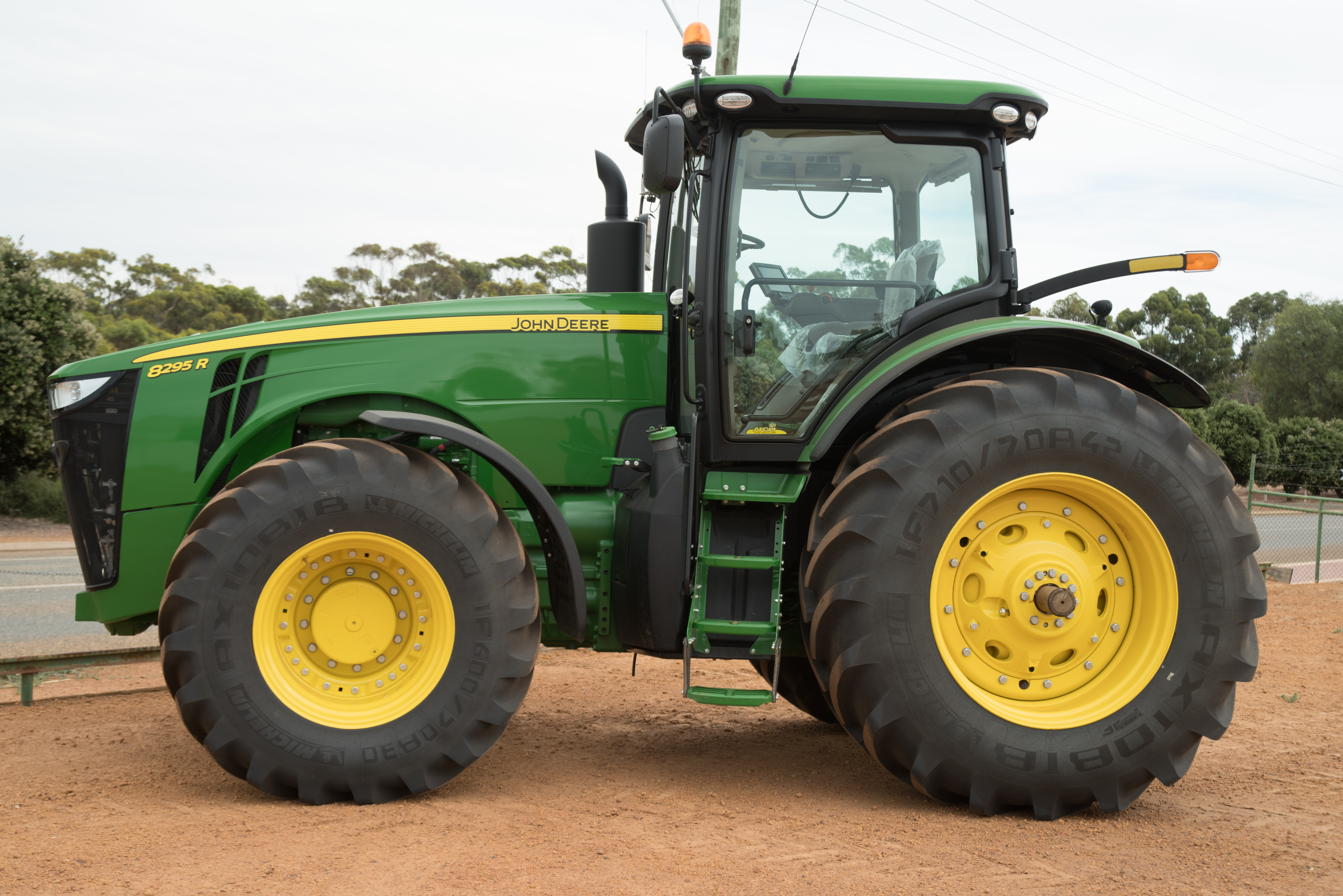
New 8R 8295R (2017 model year build)

=== 2018 ===
In 2018, John Deere had the following tractors:

- 9R, 9RT, 9RX - 4WD
- 6R, 7R, 8R, 8RT, 8RX - row crop
- 5090EL, 5075GL and 5125ML - specialty
- 1, 2, 3, 4, 5, 6 series - utility

== 2020s ==
On June 15, 2020, the X9 combines were announced on John Deere's website. The X9 combines are currently available in two models: the X9 1000 and the X9 1100.

Later in the mid 2020s John Deere introduced its largest tractors ever, including the 9RX 830 with over 800 horsepower and a 18-liter John Deere engine, which uses EGR but does not require DEF.
