= 3020 =

3020 may refer to:

- 3020, a number in the 3000 (number) range
- A.D. 3020, a year of the 4th millennium CE
- 3020 BC, a year in the 4th millennium BCE

== Roads numbered 3020 ==
- Hawaii Route 3020, a state highway
- Louisiana Highway 3020, a state highway
- Pennsylvania State Route 3020 (Dauphin County, Pennsylvania), a state highway
- Texas Farm to Market Road 3020, a state highway
- A3020 road in the UK

== Products ==
- John Deere 3020, a tractor
- NAD 3020, a stereo amplifier
- Tokyu 3020 series, an electric multiple unit train series

== Other uses ==
- 3020 Naudts, an asteroid in the Asteroid Belt, the 3020th asteroid registered
- LNWR 2-2-2 3020 Cornwall, a preserved steam locomotive

== See also ==
- German submarine U-3020, a WWII Kriegsmarine submarine
