= Model C =

Model C may refer to:

- Model C, a semi-private structure used in the governance of whites-only government schools in South Africa
- Model C, a John Deere tractor model
