= 9630 =

9630 may refer to:

- The year 9630, in the 10th millennium
- 9630 Castellion, an asteroid
- John Deere 9630, a farm tractor
- BlackBerry Tour, a mobile phone developed by Research In Motion
