= John Deere 435 =

Tractor model

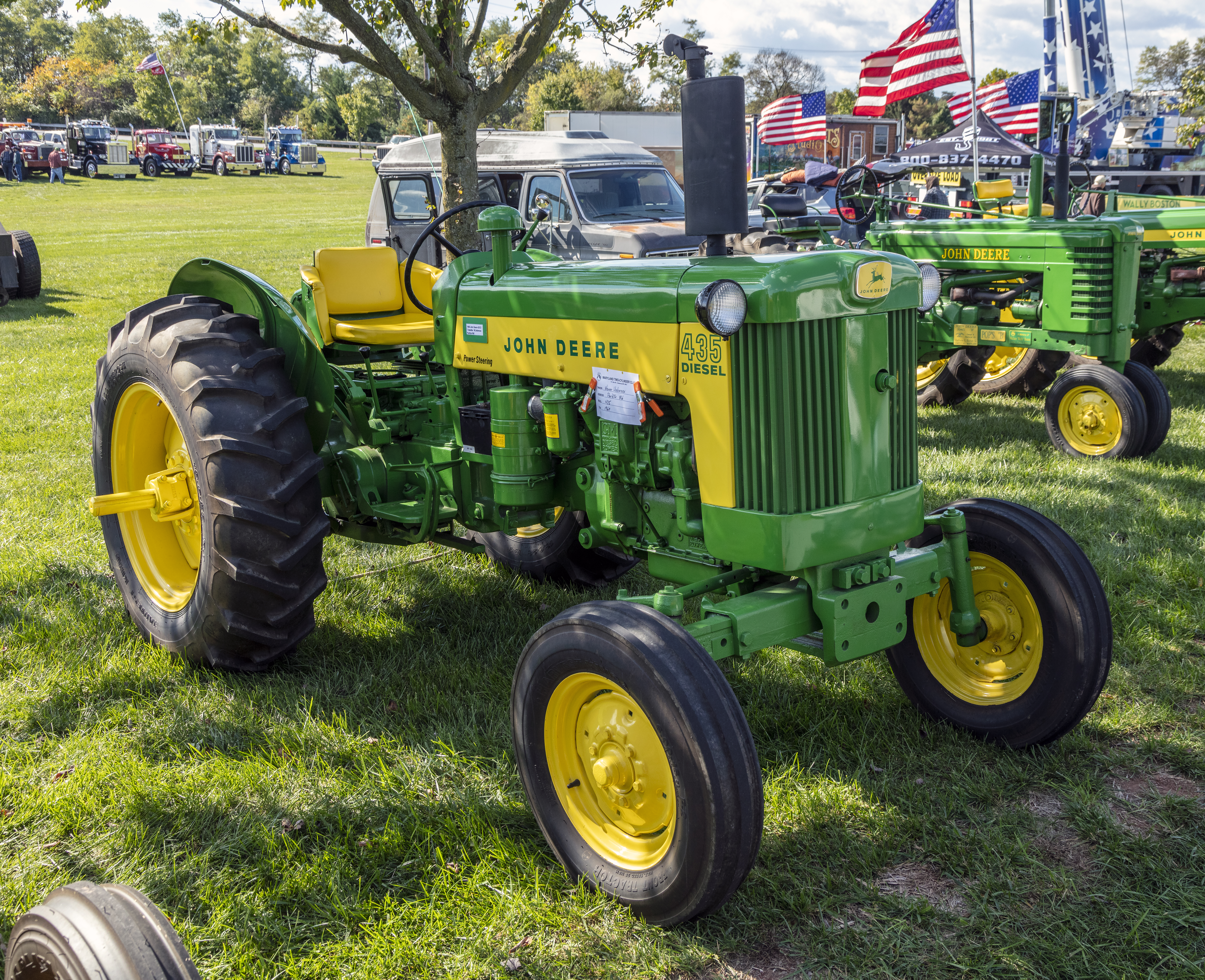
John Deere 435D

The John Deere 435 is a tractor that was built for two years, 1959 and 1960. Prior to 1960, John Deere only produced tractors that had two-cylinder engines. The John Deere 435 was the only model that had a General Motors two-cylinder two-cycle engine, in the manner similar to their heavy truck engines of that era. This engine and the two cycle truck engines were all equipped with a positive displacement supercharger. There were a total of 4,626 John Deere 435 units built.

The John Deere 435 had some options that it could come with. The front axle of the tractor had a sway-back front end for some of the models. After 1960, the option was given to have power steering rather than mechanical steering.

== See also ==
- List of John Deere tractors
