= 4020 =

4020 may refer to:

- 4020 Dominique
- John Deere 4020, a farm tractor
- ÖBB 4020, an electric train by ÖBB
- A 40/20 kick in rugby league
- The year in the 5th millennium
