= John Deere 5220 =

Utility/agricultural tractor

John Deere Model 5220
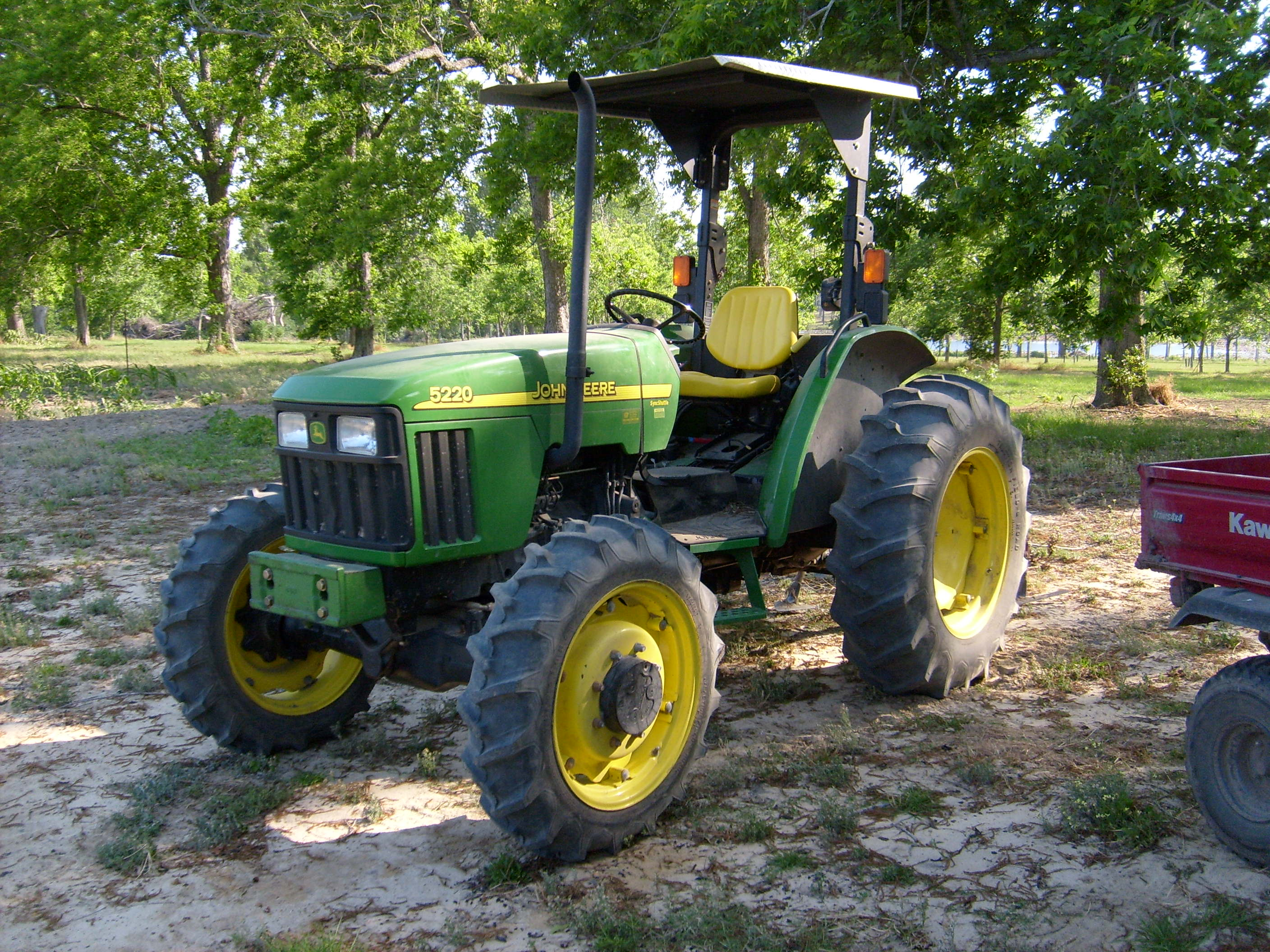
- A 2003 John Deere 5220 tractor
- Type: agricultural
- Manufacturer: John Deere
- Production: 2000–2004
- Weight: 5,630 lb (2,550 kg)
- Propulsion: wheels

The John Deere 5220 is a utility/agricultural tractor produced by John Deere, designed for residential and farming use. Manufactured from 2000 to 2004, it has a 3-cylinder, 53 horsepower (40 kW) engine which produces 140 ft⋅lbf (190 N⋅m) of torque at 2400 rpm. It was available in 2wd or Mechanical Front Wheel Drive (4wd) and has a rear hitch capacity of 3,400 lb (1,500 kg). It was mechanically nearly identical to the 5210 that it replaced but in addition to the standard straddle mount operating platform it offered an optional IOOS (Isolated Operators Operating Section), and the optional cab was improved over the previous model.

== See also ==
- List of John Deere tractors
