= John Deere 4020 =

Tractor model

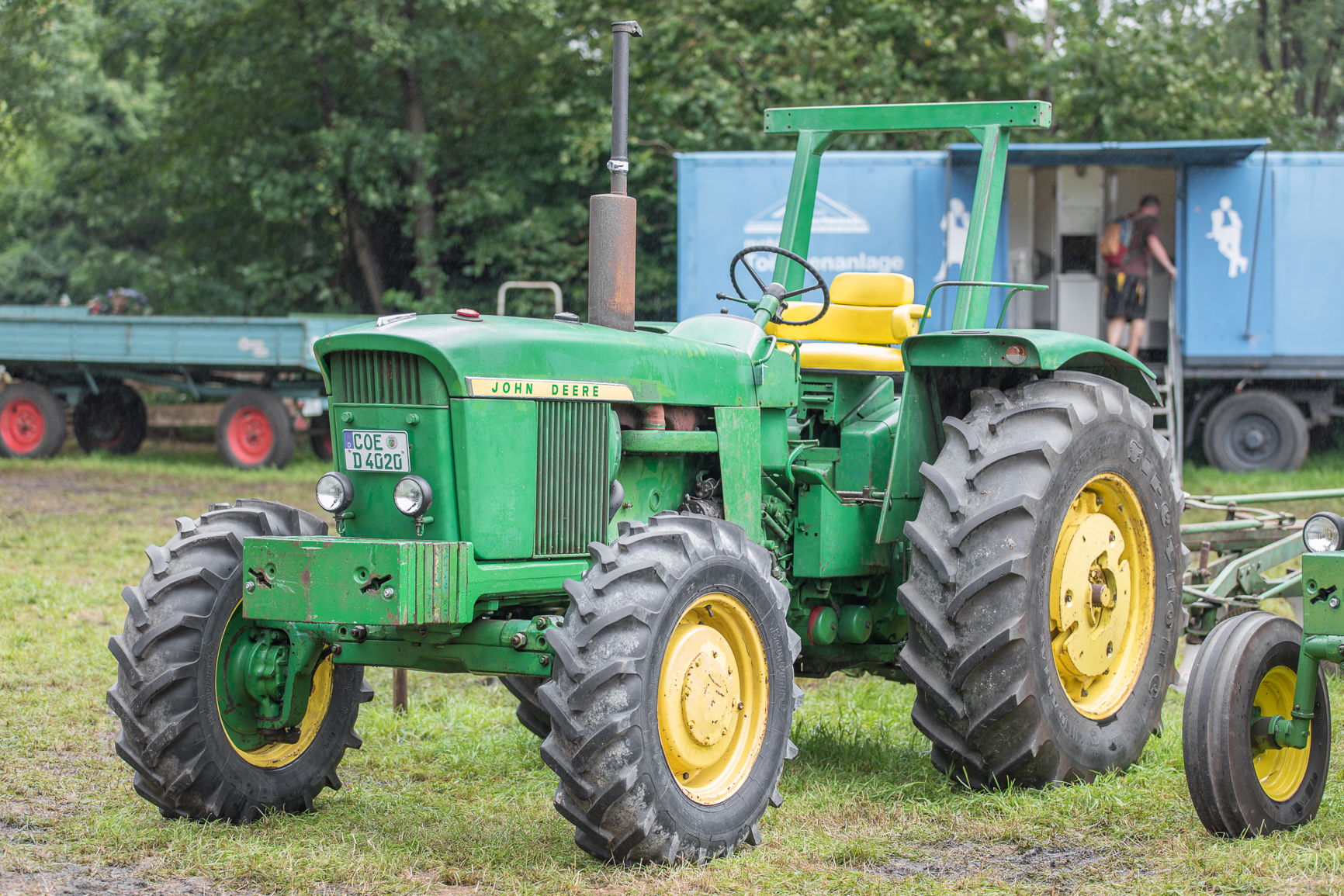
- Type: agricultural
- Manufacturer: John Deere
- Production: 1963–1972
- Length: 151 inches
- Width: 89.6 inches
- Height: 77.9 inches (row crop steering); 78.25 inches (standard steering); 88.25 inches (standard exhaust); 88.75 inches (row crop exhaust)
- Weight: 8,645 (gas synchro); 8,945 (diesel synchro); 9,240 (gas powershift); 9,560 (diesel powershift)
- Propulsion: wheels

The John Deere 4020 was an agricultural tractor model made by John Deere from 1964 to 1972. It replaced the nearly identical 4010 that had been introduced with Deere's New Generation series in 1960 and offered a number of improvements over the previous model including more horsepower, heavier rear axles, and a differential lock. The 4020 was produced with three engine options: diesel, petrol, and LPG. The 4020 Diesel has a six-cylinder engine tested at 84 drawbar and 91 PTO horsepower. John Deere's Syncro Range transmission with 8 forward speeds and two reverse speeds was standard, a power shift transmission was optional. Other options included dual rear wheels and an enclosed cab with heat and air conditioning. The 4020 is significant for its great popularity; over 184,000 units were built. It was the most popular tractor of its time.

During its production run a few minor changes were made to the 4020 and other tractors of the New Generation series. Some of these improvements included moving the hydraulic levers from the left side of the dash to a console to the right of the operator, a narrower oval muffler for improved visibility, and a longer, bent, gear shift lever.

In 1969 John Deere introduced the 4000 tractor that was based on the 4020. It was a high horsepower-to-weight tractor, designed as a "runner" rather than a "lugger". Using the same engine as the 4020, but being almost 1000 lbs lighter, the 4000 could, according to Deere, in the same amount of time, pull a 4-bottom plow fast enough to cover the same acreage as a 4020 pulling a 5-bottom plow. The John Deere 4000 was also an economy tractor, providing the same power as the 4020 with fewer features and smaller rear axles at a lower price. However most buyers opted for the popular 4020 and only 7,987 of the 4000 tractors were built.

When John Deere introduced its Generation-II tractors in 1972, the 4020 was replaced by the 100 horsepower 4230.

== Gallery ==
John Deere 4020 Examples

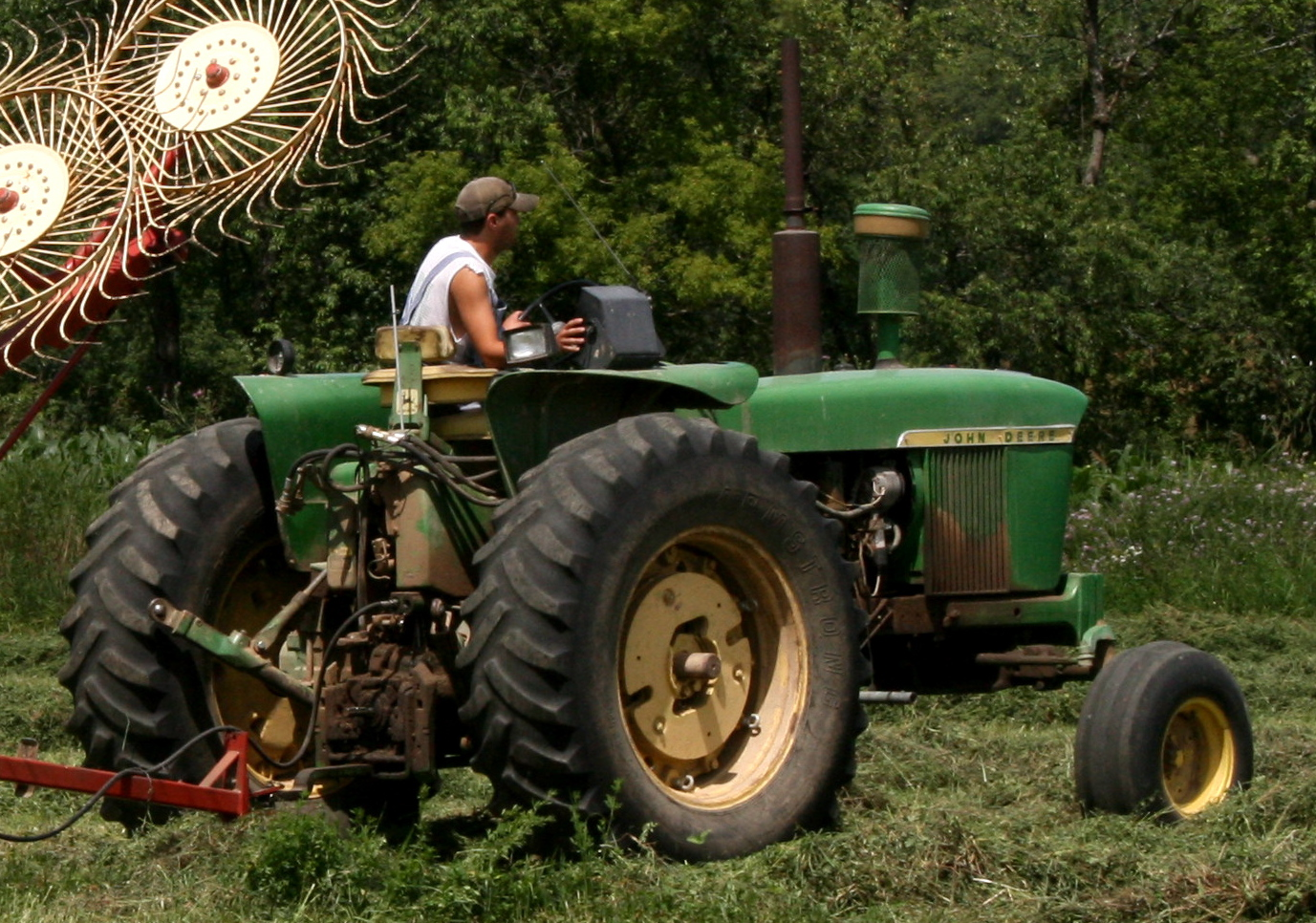
Row Crop Diesel 4020

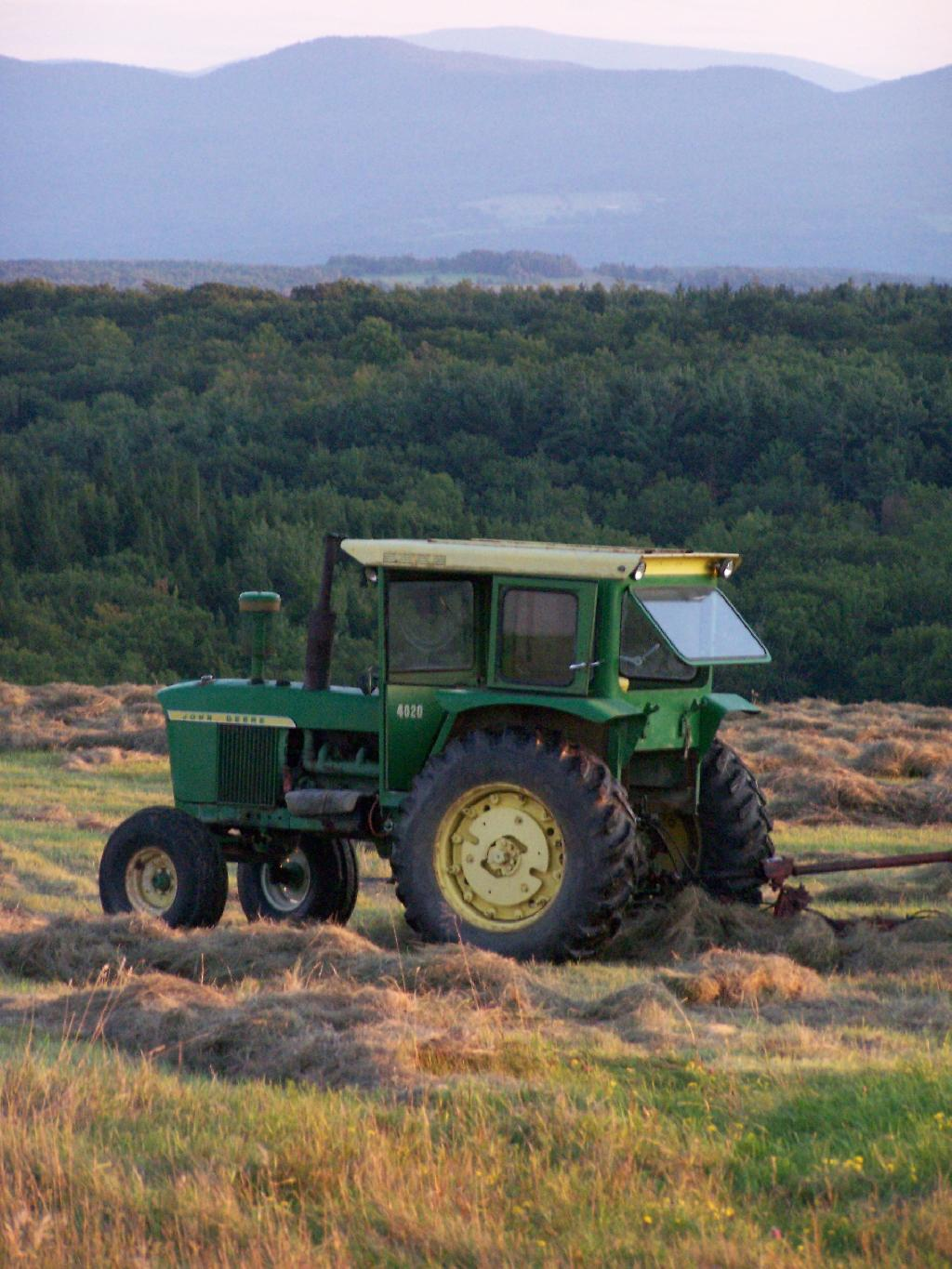
4020 Diesel with Optional Cab

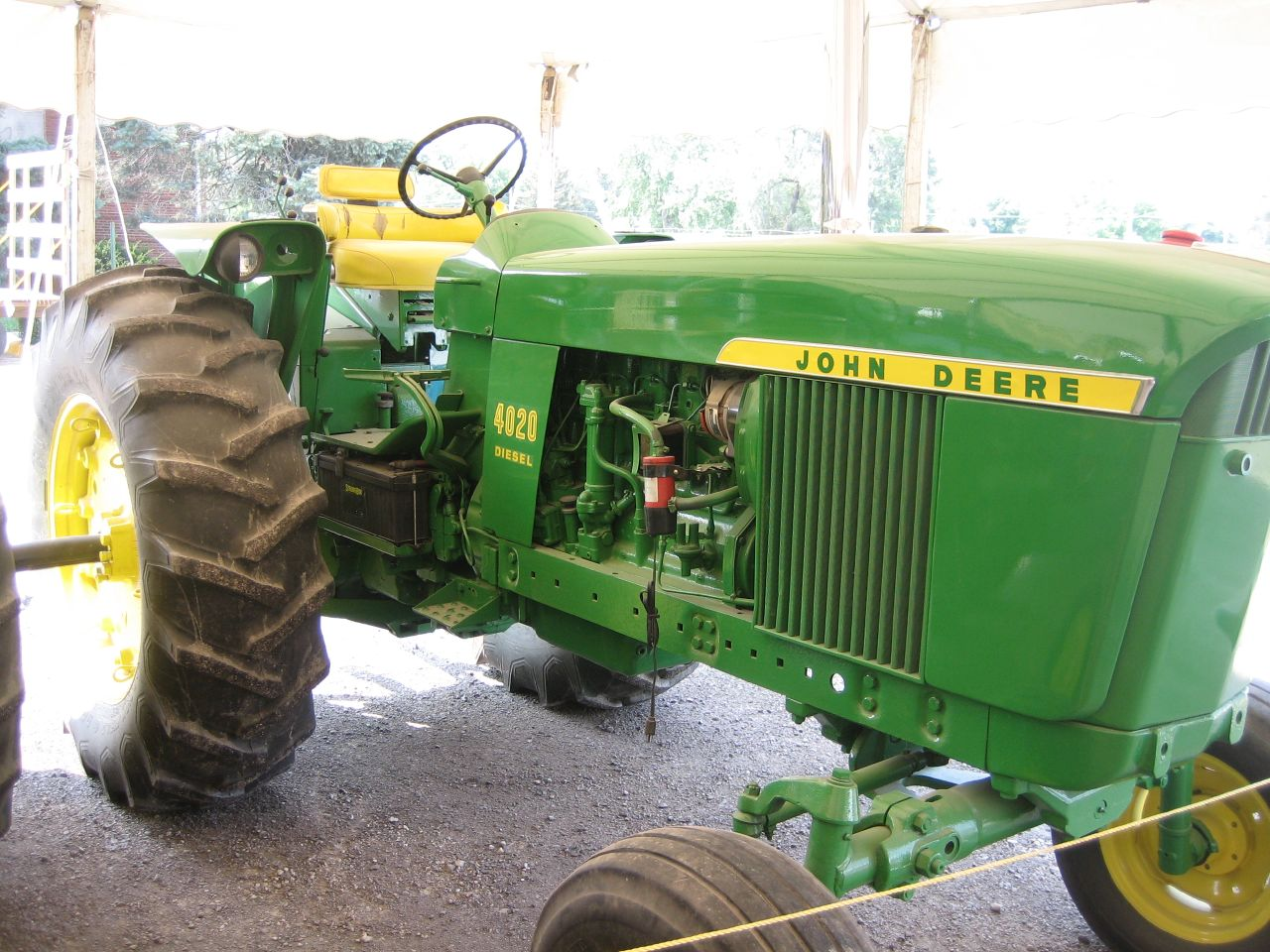
Restored 4020 Diesel

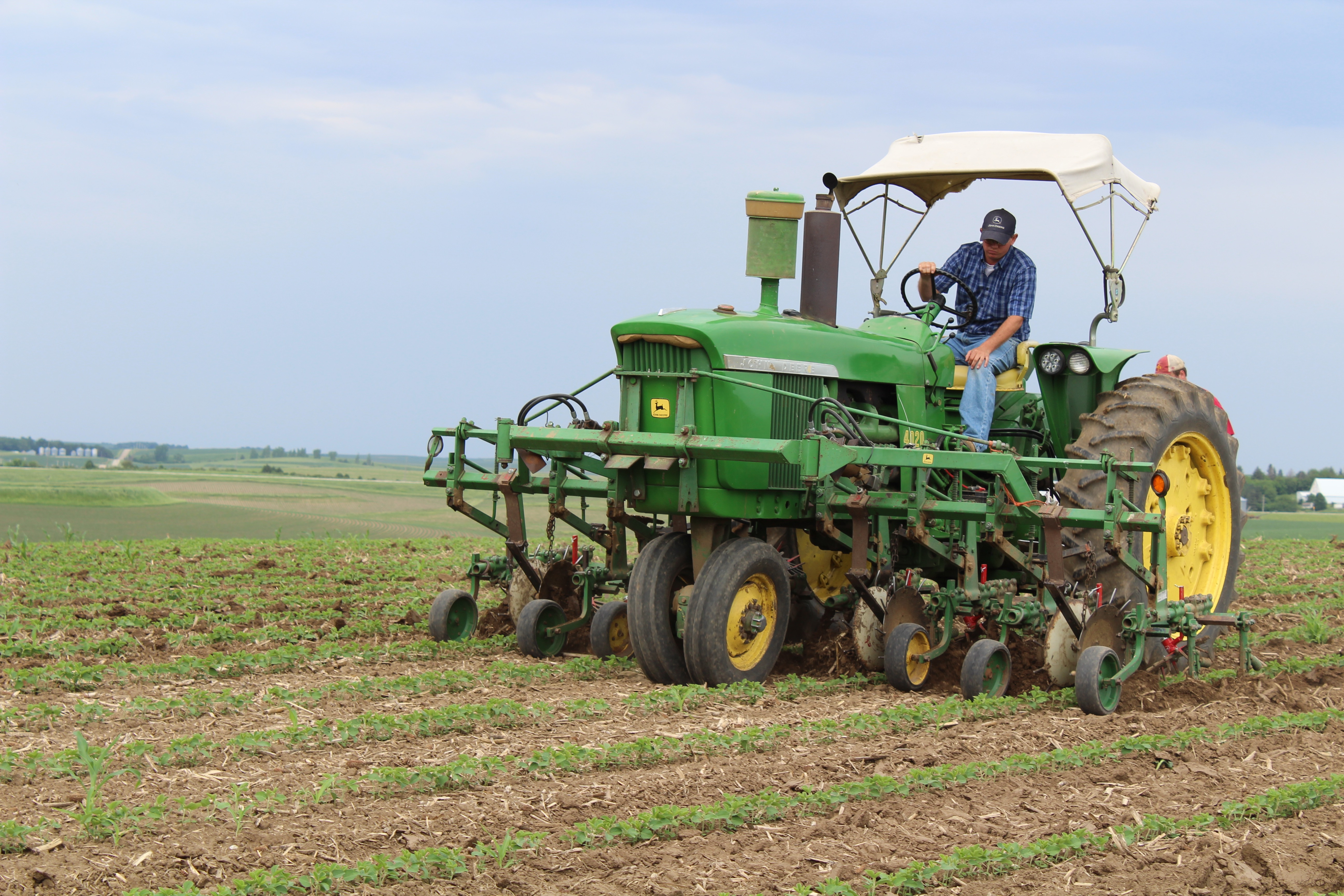
4020 narrow front with cultivator attachment
