= John Deere 4010 =

Tractor model

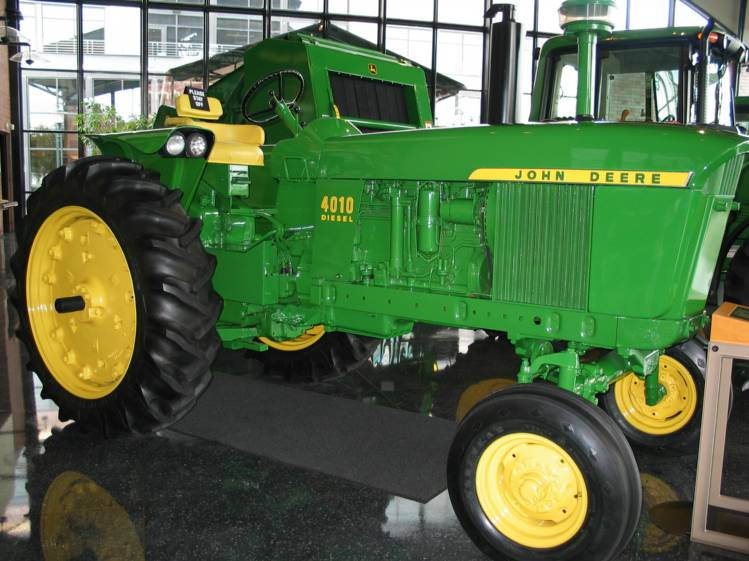
John Deere 4010 Diesel

The John Deere 4010 was an American farm tractor in production by the John Deere Company from 1960 to 1963. The 4010 was the primary attraction of the new "10" series, known as the "New Generation" or "New Generation of Power"” which consisted of four- and six-cylinder tractors first introduced in 1959 to replace the two-cylinder models that had brought John Deere great success as a tractor manufacturer up to that time. The "10" series tractors were introduced to John Deere dealers in dramatic fashion on August 30, 1960, when dealers from around the world were invited to Dallas, Texas, to see the entire new series debuted at the Dallas Memorial Auditorium.

The 4010 was rated at 80 horsepower in 1960, but tested at 84 horsepower during Nebraska field testing trials making it one of the most powerful two wheel drive farm tractors at that time. The 4010 was the predecessor to the John Deere 4020 which is widely regarded as the most popular tractor ever produced by John Deere and perhaps any other tractor manufacturer in the United States. Although the 4020 would later hold greater popularity, it was the 4010 that catapulted John Deere into the modern era of farm tractor technology and design following its successful history as a tractor manufacturer that was by then experiencing waning market share due to its aging two-cylinder engine technology.

In addition to the advanced engine technology, the “10” series tractors offered many other upgrades from the older two-cylinder models including significantly higher horsepower-to-weight ratio, advanced hydraulics, more convenient and comfortable operator station as well as many other improvements. Of the “10” series John Deere tractors introduced in 1959, the 4010 was by far the most popular with more than 58,000 units sold from 1960 to 1963. The success of the “10” series John Deere tractors, led by the 4010, helped propel John Deere from a 23% market share in 1959 to 34% by 1964 when the 4020 was introduced making it the top manufacturer of farm equipment in the United States.

== Elvis Presley ==
Elvis acquired a 1963 model 4010 in 1967, with his purchase of Twinkletown Farm. The tractor was shortly after taken to his Graceland home where it was on daily duty until 2008. Following its retirement and replacement with a fresh John Deere tractor, it was restored by students at Northwest Mississippi Community College and placed on display at the Elvis Presley Memphis Museum. A licensed 1/16 toy replica of Elvis's tractor was produced by the Ertl Company.
