= Sanaswadi =

Village in Maharashtra

- village
- Location in Maharashtra, India Sanaswadi (India)
- Coordinates: 18°40′50″N 74°6′42″E
- Country: India
- State: Maharashtra
- District: Pune

Government
  - Body: Gram panchayat

Population
  - Total: 13,543

Languages
  - Official: Marathi
- Time zone: UTC+5:30 (IST)
- PIN: 412208
- Telephone code: 02137
- ISO 3166 code: IN-MH
- Vehicle registration: MH 12
- Nearest city: Pune, Shirur
- Sex ratio: 52 : 48 ♂/♀
- Literacy: 87.32%
- Lok Sabha constituency: Shirur
- Vidhan Sabha constituency: Shirur
- Website: pune.nic.in

Sanaswadi is an industrial village. It is a part of Maharashtra Industrial Development Corporation (MIDC). Together this set up is called Sanaswadi-Shikrapur Industrial Belt.

== Geography ==
The village is located approximately 30 km to the east of the city of Pune. Village located on Pune–Ahmednagar highway and well connected to nearby industrial & major cities.
