= John Deere 9630 =

Tractor model

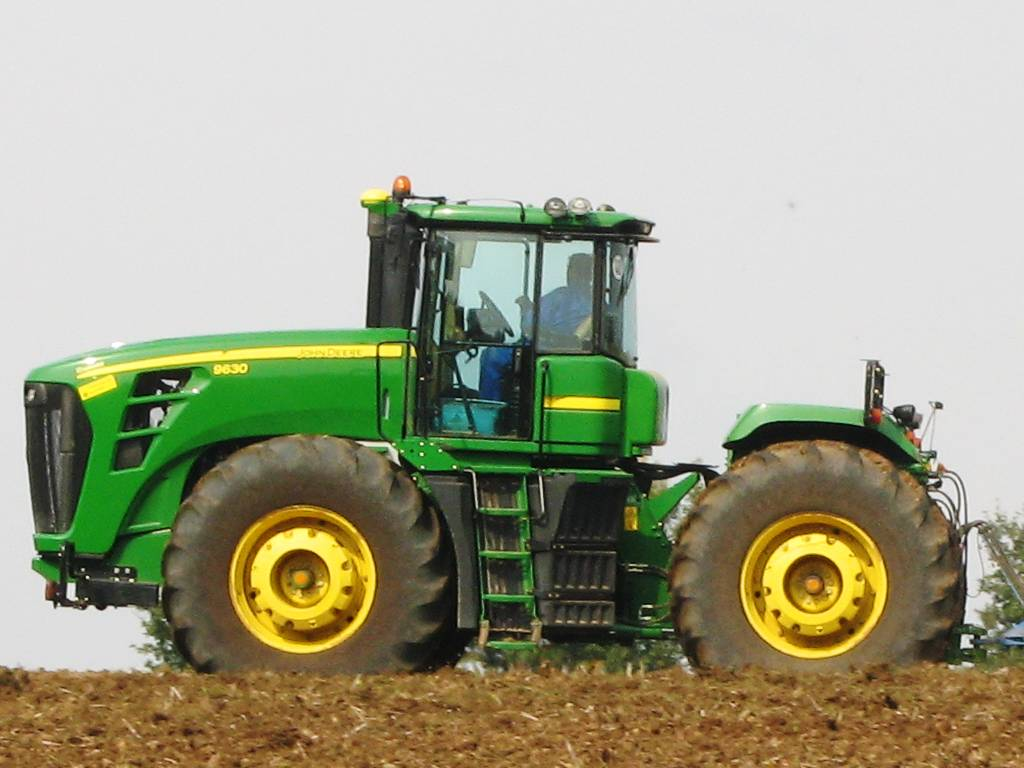
- A John Deere 9630
- Type: Agricultural
- Manufacturer: John Deere
- Production: 2007-2011
- Weight: 37,290 lb (16.9 t) (shipping); 39,465 lb (17.9 t) (operating); 54,165 lb (24.6 t) (ballasted)
- Propulsion: wheels

The John Deere 9630 is an agricultural tractor model manufactured by John Deere. It is one of the largest production tractors in the world, and was the largest made by John Deere upon its release in 2007 until the end of its production in 2013. The 9630 has a 530-horsepower (400 kW) six cylinder diesel engine that displaces 826.7 cubic inches (13.55 L), and was tested at 427 hp (318 kW) on the drawbar (53,666 lb_{f} (238.72 kN) max pull on the drawbar). The 9630 is an articulated tractor, coming stock with eight equally sized tires, duals in the front and back. Its ballasted weight ("loaded" tires, wheelweights, etc.) is over 25 short tons (23 t).

== Tracked variant ==
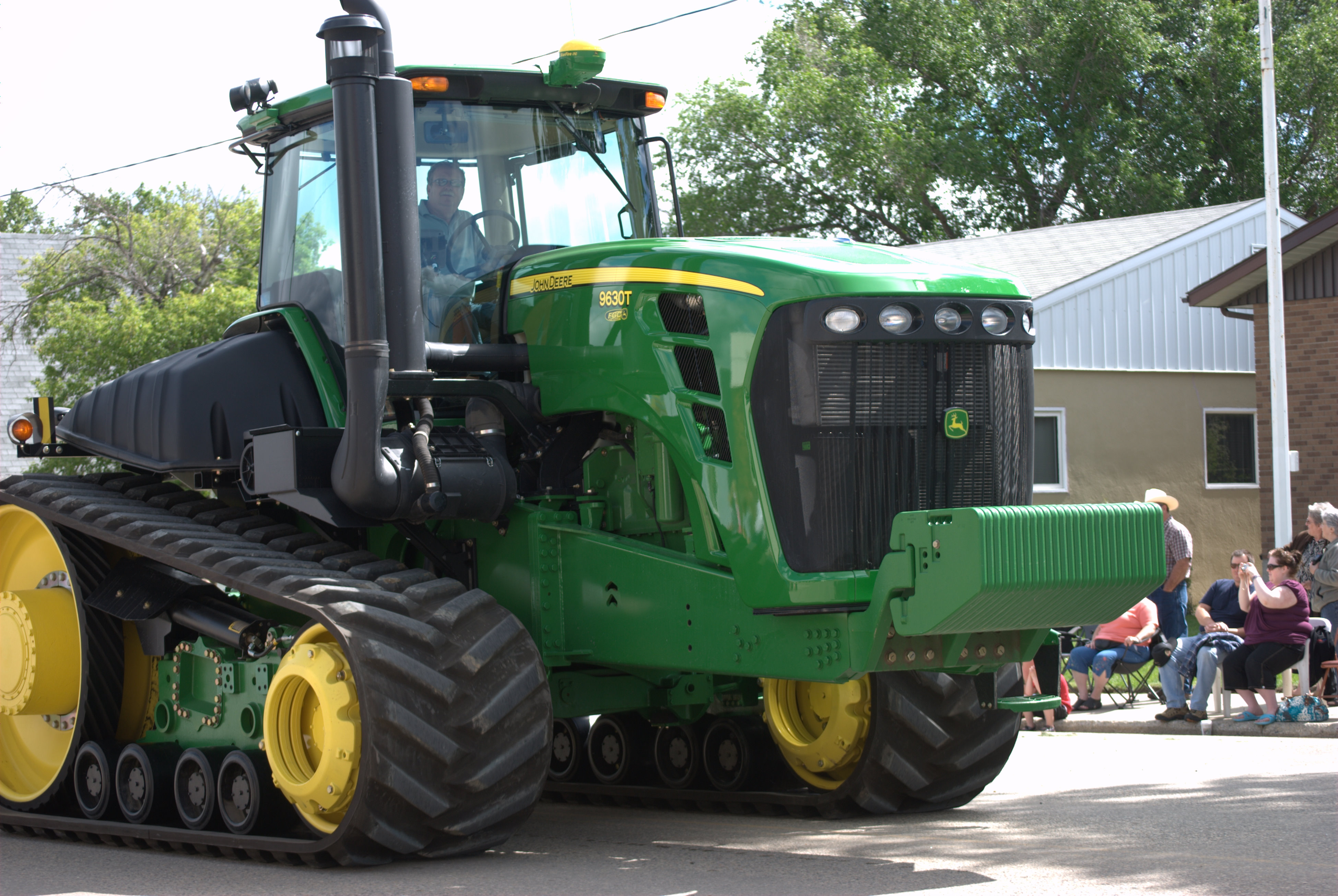
A 9630T, a 9630 with rubber tracks

The 9630 is also available with tracks instead of tires and is the 9630T. The 9630T is significantly different from the 9630 in that it is not articulated. It has only two tracks instead of being articulated and having four like a Case IH QuadTrac. This results in it having a significantly different design.

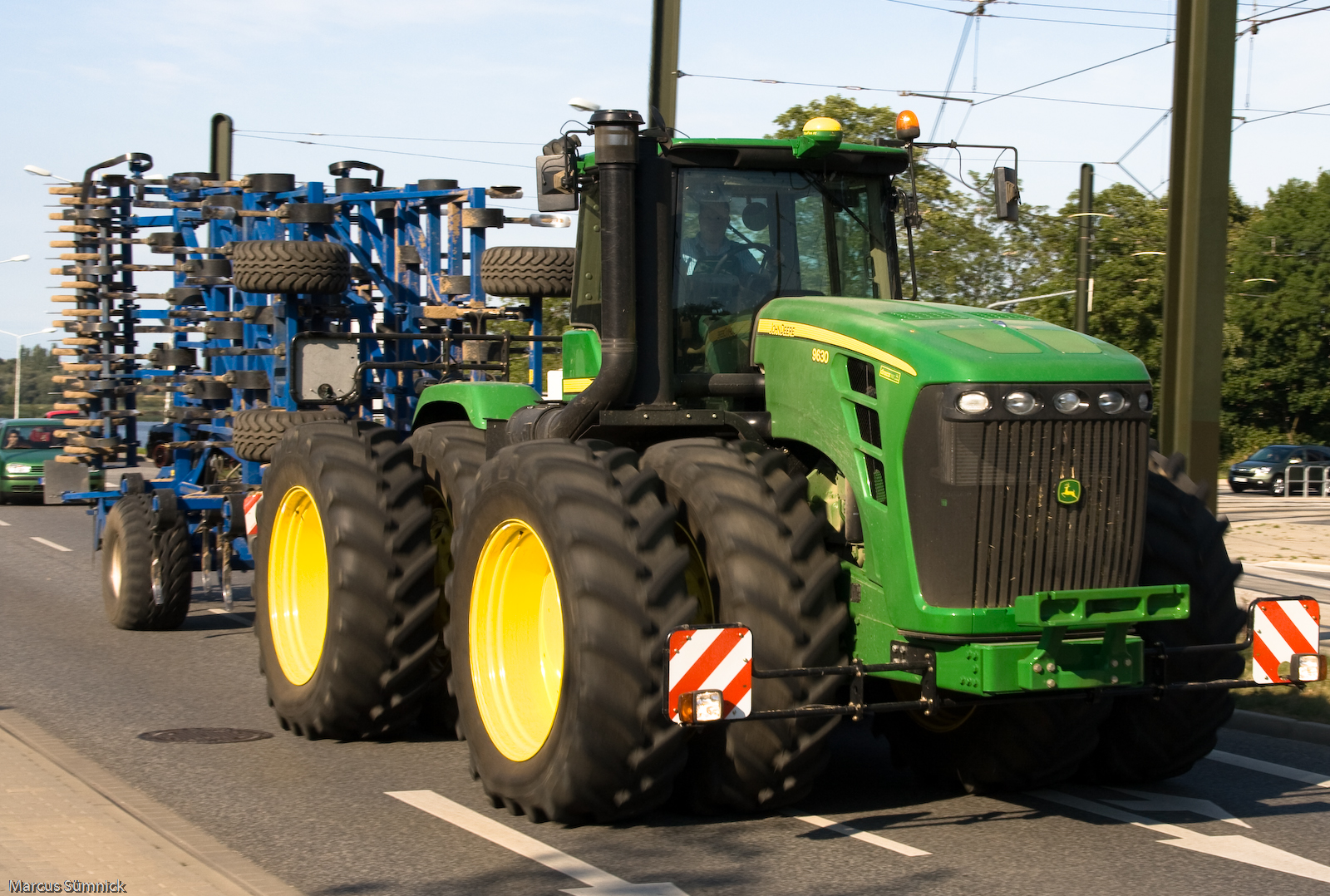
A John Deere 9630 in Germany
