= John Deere 3020 =

Tractor model

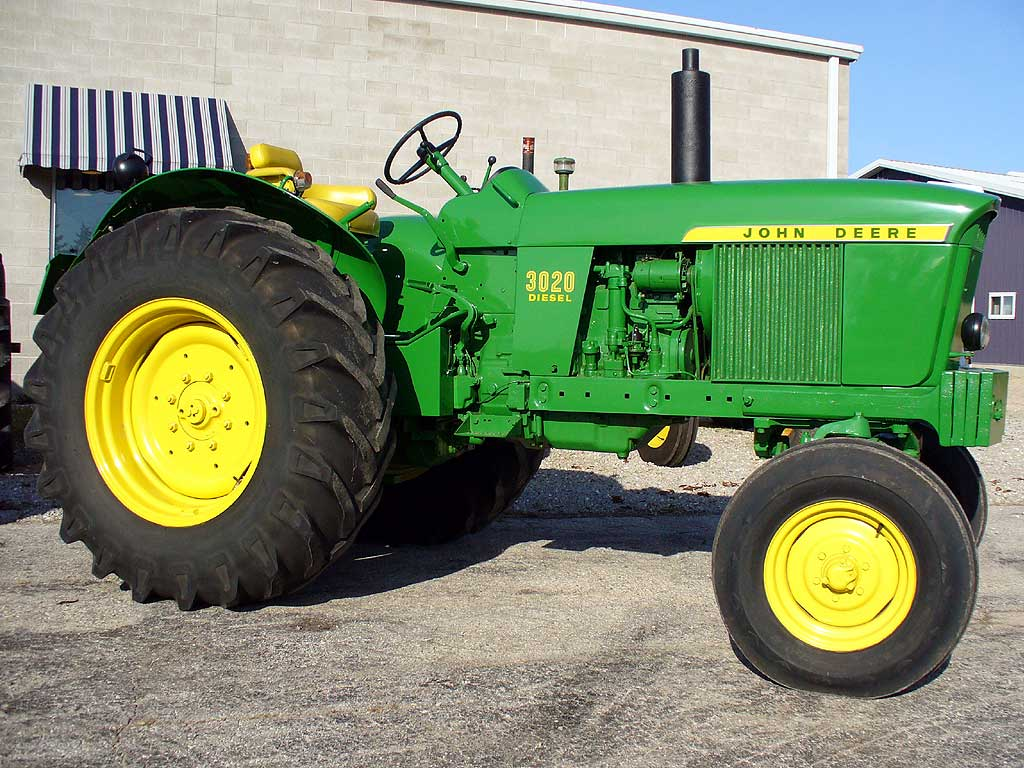
- John Deere 3020 Row Crop Utility
- Type: agricultural
- Manufacturer: John Deere
- Production: 1964-1972
- Length: 138.5 inches
- Width: 89.625 inches
- Height: 66.5 inches
- Weight: 7,695-7,945 lbs. (operating weight); 9,585 lbs. (ballasted weight)
- Propulsion: wheels

John Deere 3020 is a tractor that was manufactured by John Deere as part of its New Generation series from 1964 to 1972. The 3020 is nearly identical to the John Deere 3010 model that it replaced. It has a wheelbase of 90 inches, and a fuel capacity of 29 gallons. It was offered with three different engine options including a 3.7L 4-cyl gasoline engine, a 4.4L 4-cyl diesel and a 3.7L 4-cyl LP gas engine all produced by John Deere. The 3020 was rated at 71 horsepower. Transmission options included the standard Synchro Range transmission that offered 8 forward speeds and two reverse speeds and an optional eight speed power shift transmission. Several different tread options were offered by John Deere on the 3020 including, standard, narrow front Row Crop, narrow front Row Crop with "Roll-O-Matic", wide front Row Crop, Row Crop Utility. and Orchard.

During its production run a few minor changes were made to the 3020 and other tractors of the New Generation series. These included moving the hydraulic levers from the left side of the dash to a console to the right of the operator, moving the PTO lever from the right side of the dash to the left, a narrower oval muffler for improved visibility, and a longer, bent, gear shift lever.

Some factory options available on the 3020 included hydraulic front wheel assist, a Roll Gard, roll over protective structure, a steel canopy that bolted to the Roll Gard. An enclosed cab with heat and air conditioning was also available as an extra cost option.

From 1964 to 1969 John Deere also produced an industrial variant of the 3020. It was painted yellow instead of green and was known as the John Deere 500.
