= John Deere Model G =

Row crop tractor

John Deere G
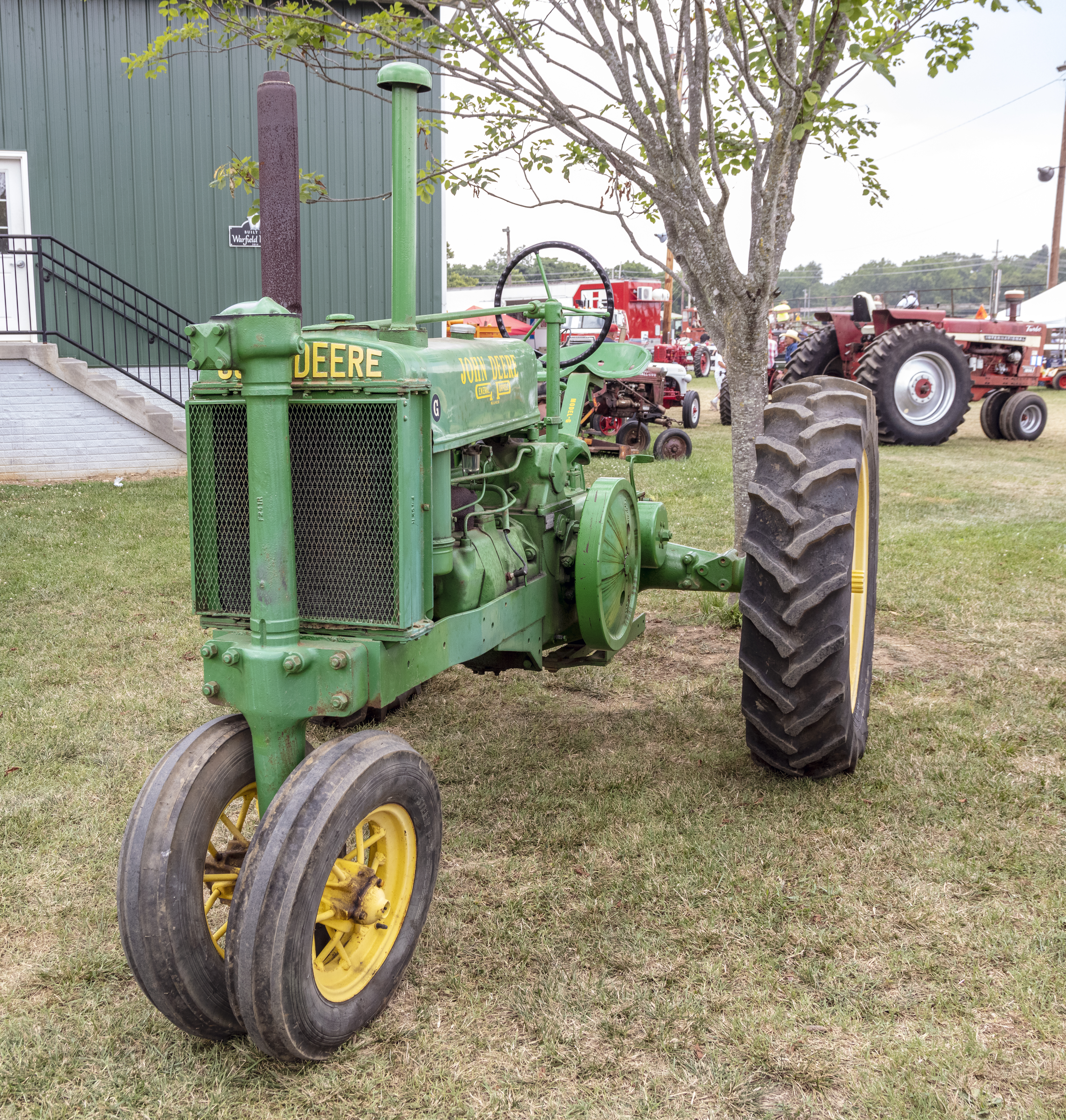
- Unstyled John Deere G
- Type: Row-crop agricultural tractor
- Manufacturer: John Deere
- Production: 1937-1953
- Propulsion: Wheels
- Gross power: 34 horsepower (25 kW)
- NTTL test: 295

The John Deere Model G tractor was a large three-plow row-crop tractor produced by John Deere from 1937 to 1953, with successor models produced until 1961. It was followed by the 70, 720, and 730.

== Description and production ==
The G was released by John Deere in 1937, and it was a general-purpose row-crop tractor, with enough power to manage three plows. As with most row-crop tractors, the spacing between the rear wheels could be adjusted to suit row spacings. On later models, the front wheels were offered with wide and narrow wheel arrangements. The tractor was equipped with a two-cylinder side-by-side 34-horsepower (25 kW) engine, of 412.5-cubic-inch (6,760 cm^{3}) displacement. Both gasoline and kerosene-fueled versions were available. About 64,000 Model Gs were built at the John Deere factory in Waterloo, Iowa. Sale price was about $2,600.

The G was originally to be the Model F, since A, B, C (the GP), D and E (for stationary engines) had all been used, but Deere wished to avoid confusion with the Farmall F-20 and moved to G, retaining the F-prefix for part numbers.

Early Gs tended to overheat, so a larger radiator was fitted. The G received Henry Dreyfuss styling in 1942 and was designated the GM, as it was considered modernized. The plain G designation was reinstated in 1947, and GN (single front wheel) and GW (wide front wheels) models were produced.

=== John Deere 70 ===
In 1953 the G was replaced by the John Deere 70 with all-new styling. The 70 could be ordered for gasoline, distillate, liquefied petroleum gas, and diesel fuels. Engine power was increased, and the 70 could pull four or five plows. The gasoline starting engine for the diesel engines was updated from a horizontally opposed two-cylinder to a V-4. The diesel was found to be particularly powerful, and sold well. About 43,000 70s were built at Waterloo, at a sales price of about $2,800.

=== John Deere 720 ===
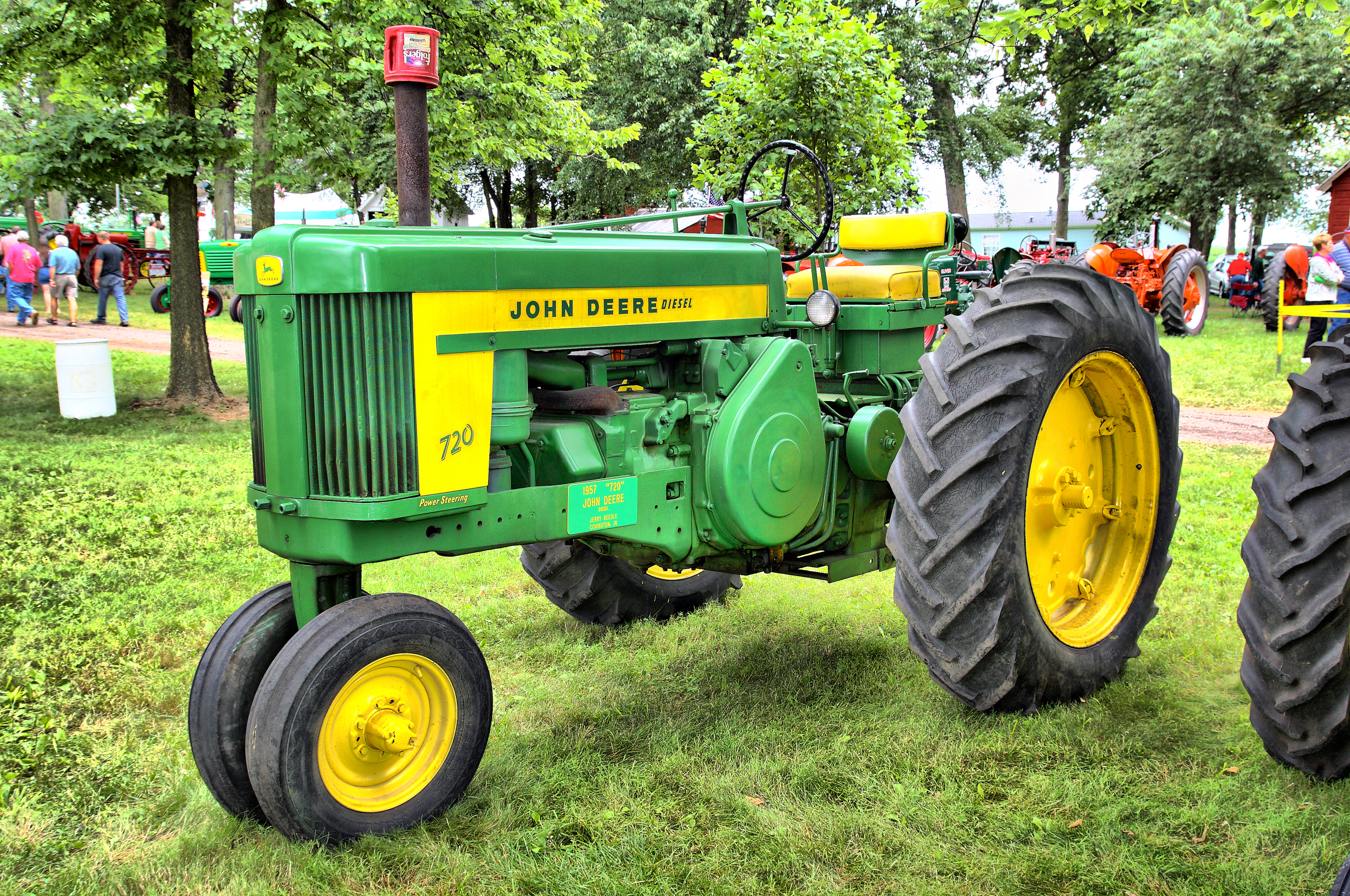
John Deere 720

In 1956, the 70 was replaced by the John Deere 720 with freshened up styling. The 720 was the largest two-cylinder tractor to be offered by Deere and the most powerful row-crop tractor of the time. The 720's gasoline engine developed 65 horsepower (48 kW).

=== John Deere 730 ===
In 1958 the John Deere 730 was introduced, but it retained the same powertrain as the 720. An electric start in lieu of the gasoline starting engine was offered for diesel models. Production in the United States ran through 1961, when the tooling was relocated to a plant in Rosario, Argentina, where production continued until 1968.

720s and 730s were produced at the Waterloo plant. 22,925 were manufactured, at a sales price of about $3,700.
