= John Deere MC =

Overview
- Type: Agricultural tractor
- Manufacturer: John Deere
- Production: 1949–1952

Powertrain
- Propulsion: Tracks

Dimensions
- Length: 102 inches (260 cm)
- Width: 67 inches (170 cm)
- Height: 64 inches (160 cm)
- Curb weight: 4,150 lbs. (tractor only); 4,000 lbs. (shipping)

John Deere MC is a crawl type tractor that was manufactured by John Deere from 1949 to 1952. It was the first crawl type tractor manufactured by John Deere. It was derived from the conventional, rubber wheeled "M" row crop tractor, and utilized John Deere's two cylinder gasoline engine sometimes referred to as a "Johnny Popper" because of its distinctive sound. Many of the parts for the engine, transmission and sheet metal are interchangeable with the John Deere Model M.
