= John Deere Model H =

Row crop tractor

John Deere H
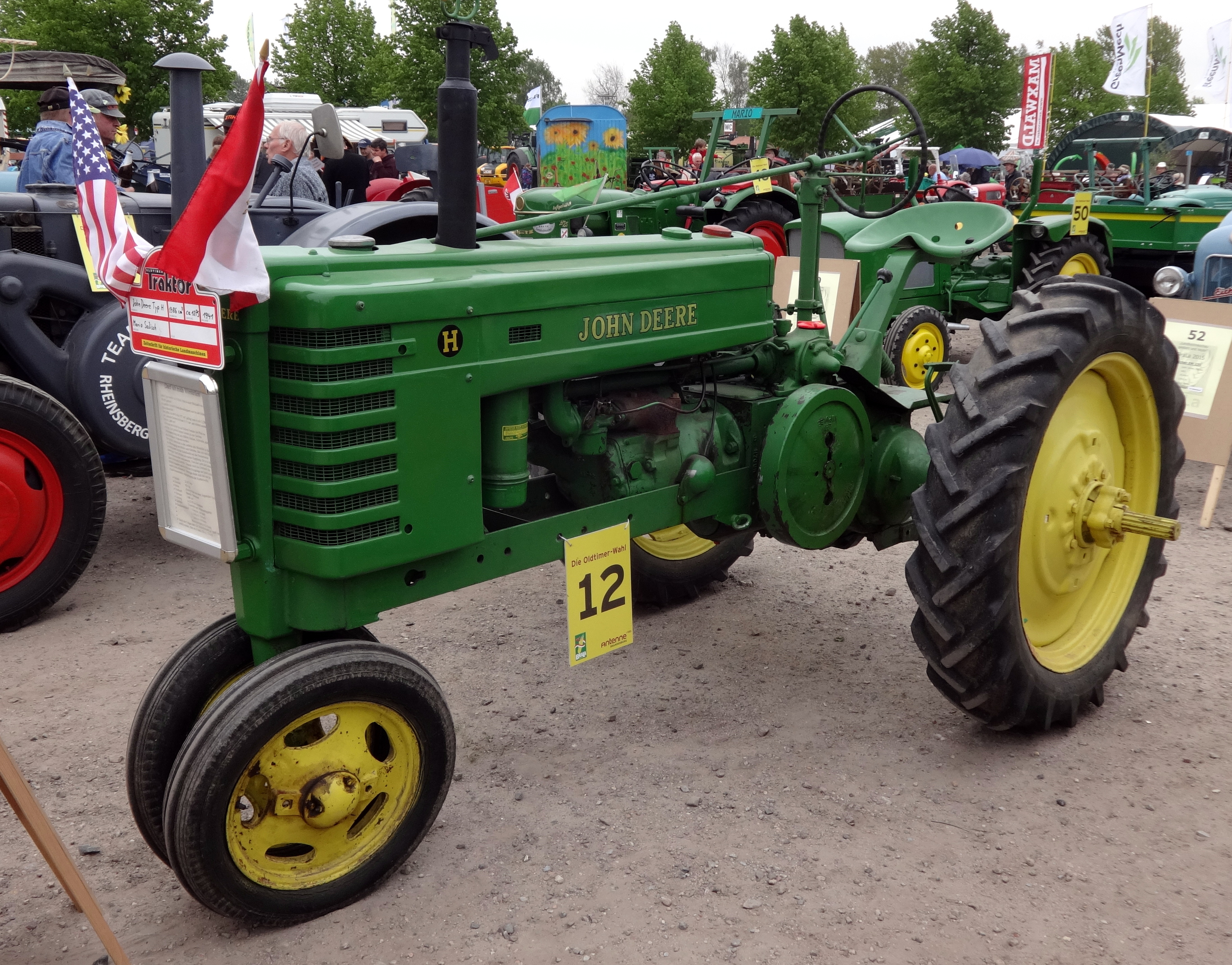
- John Deere H
- Type: Row-crop agricultural tractor
- Manufacturer: John Deere
- Production: 1939–1947
- Length: 111.25 inches (282.6 cm)
- Width: 79 inches (200 cm)
- Height: 52 inches (130 cm) to steering wheel)
- Weight: 3,035 pounds (1,377 kg) (ballasted)
- Propulsion: Rear wheels
- Gross power: 15 horsepower (11 kW)
- PTO power: 14.84 horsepower (11.07 kW) (belt)
- Drawbar power: 12.48 horsepower (9.31 kW)
- Drawbar pull: 1,839 pounds (834 kg)
- NTTL test: 312

The John Deere Model H tractor was a row-crop tractor produced by John Deere from 1939 to 1947.

== Description and production ==
The H was introduced in 1939 as a much-scaled-down version of the John Deere Model G. It was a general-purpose row-crop tractor, intended for smaller farms. As with most row-crop tractors, the spacing between the rear wheels could be adjusted to suit row spacings. The front wheels were offered with wide and narrow wheel arrangements, as well as high-crop and single front wheel versions. The tractor was equipped with a two-cylinder side-by-side engine of 99.7 cubic inches (1,634 cc) displacement. A cost-saving peculiarity of the H was that the engine output was through the camshaft rather than through the crankshaft. A three-speed transmission was provided. The H was produced only for kerosene fuel. Production ended in 1947. The Model M was an indirect follow-on product.

58,584 Model Hs were built at the John Deere factory in Waterloo, Iowa.
