= John Deere Model M =

Row crop tractor

John Deere M
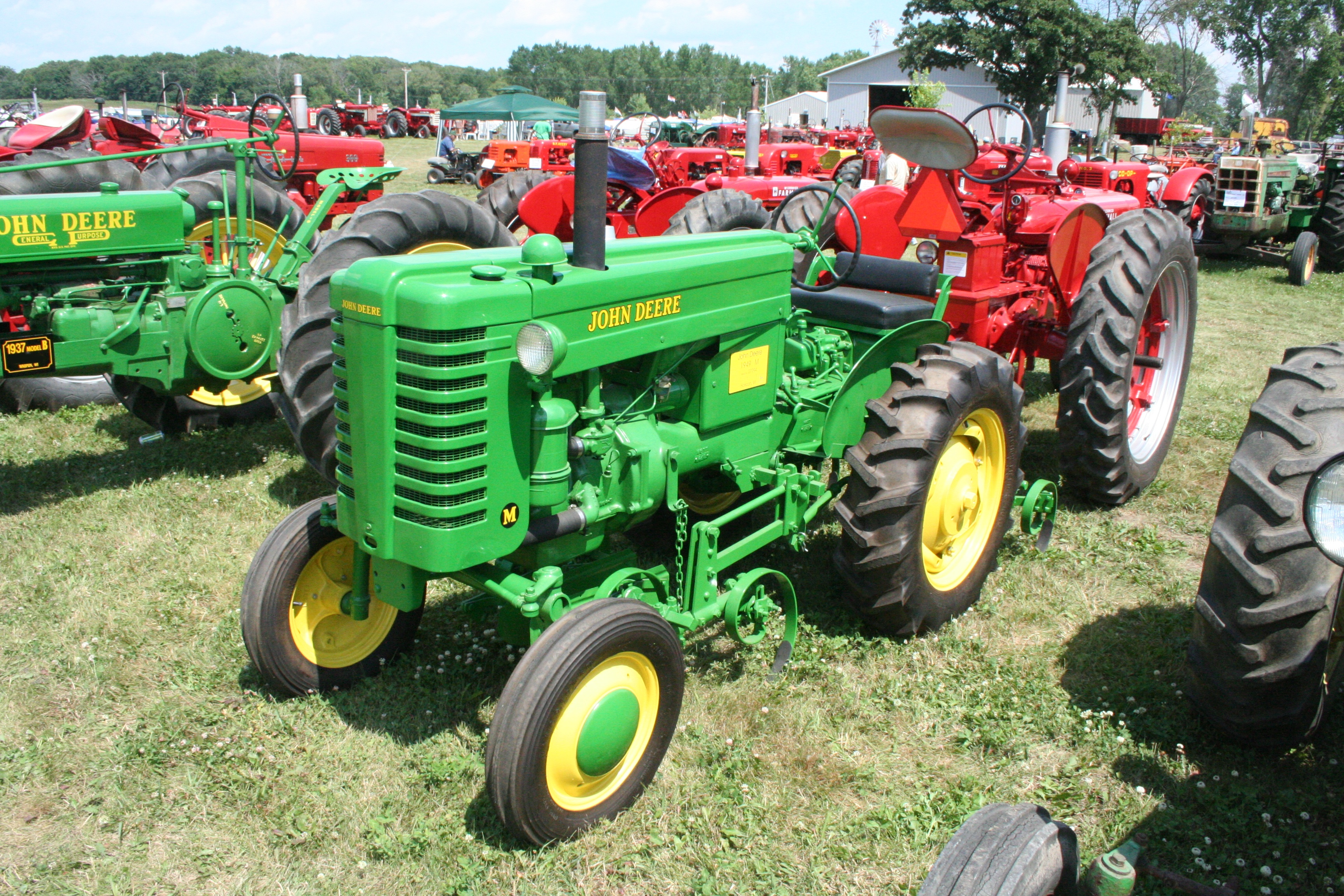
- John Deere M with wide front axle and cultivating equipment
- Type: Row-crop agricultural tractor
- Manufacturer: John Deere
- Production: 1947-1952
- Length: 110 inches (280 cm)
- Width: 51 inches (130 cm)
- Height: 56 inches (140 cm) (to steering wheel)
- Weight: 2,600 pounds (1,200 kg)
- Propulsion: Rear wheels
- Gross power: 22 horsepower (16 kW)
- PTO power: 20.45 horsepower (15.25 kW) (belt)
- Drawbar power: 18.15 horsepower (13.53 kW)
- Drawbar pull: 2,329 pounds (1,056 kg)
- NTTL test: 387
- Succeeded by: John Deere 40

The John Deere Model M tractor was a two-cylinder row-crop tractor produced by John Deere from 1947 to 1952, with successor models produced until 1960. It was succeeded by the updated 40, 420 and 430 models, as well as the 320 and 330 models that occupied the market positions left vacant by the more powerful 400 series models.

== Description and production ==
The "M" was first produced in 1947, and the model lasted until 1952. It was a general-purpose row-crop tractor, intended as a replacement for the H and the L models. As with most row-crop tractors, the spacing between the front wheels could be adjusted to suit row spacings. The model "M" was later offered with both traditionally spaced front wheels and also in the model "MT" which had a tricycle type configuration in which the front wheels were closely spaced, effectively acting as one single front wheel. All "M" configurations used a conventional worm gear steering system. The tractor was equipped with a carburetor-fed, two-cylinder, gasoline powered, in-line configuration engine producing approximately 18-horsepower (13 kW), and displaced a relatively small 100.5-cubic-inch (1,647 cc). This engine had a "square" ratio 4.0 inch piston bore and 4.0 inch crankshaft stroke and a distributor type ignition system with contact points. Later production model "M"s were variously advertised as producing between 18hp and 22hp and rated at a maximum of 1650 RPM. 45,799 Model Ms were built at the John Deere factory in Dubuque, Iowa. Sale price was about $1,075.

=== John Deere 40 ===
From 1953 the M was replaced by the John Deere 40. with updated styling, and 15% more power, achieved with higher engine RPMs. They were the first John Deere tractors to receive a three-point hitch. All versions carried over from the M, with high-crop (40H), utility (40U), standard, narrow and wide front wheels, and crawlers. An intermediate-clearance version, the 40V, was introduced in 1954. The 40W was a two-row utility tractor. About 18,000 40s were built at Dubuque, selling for about $1,500.

=== John Deere 420 ===
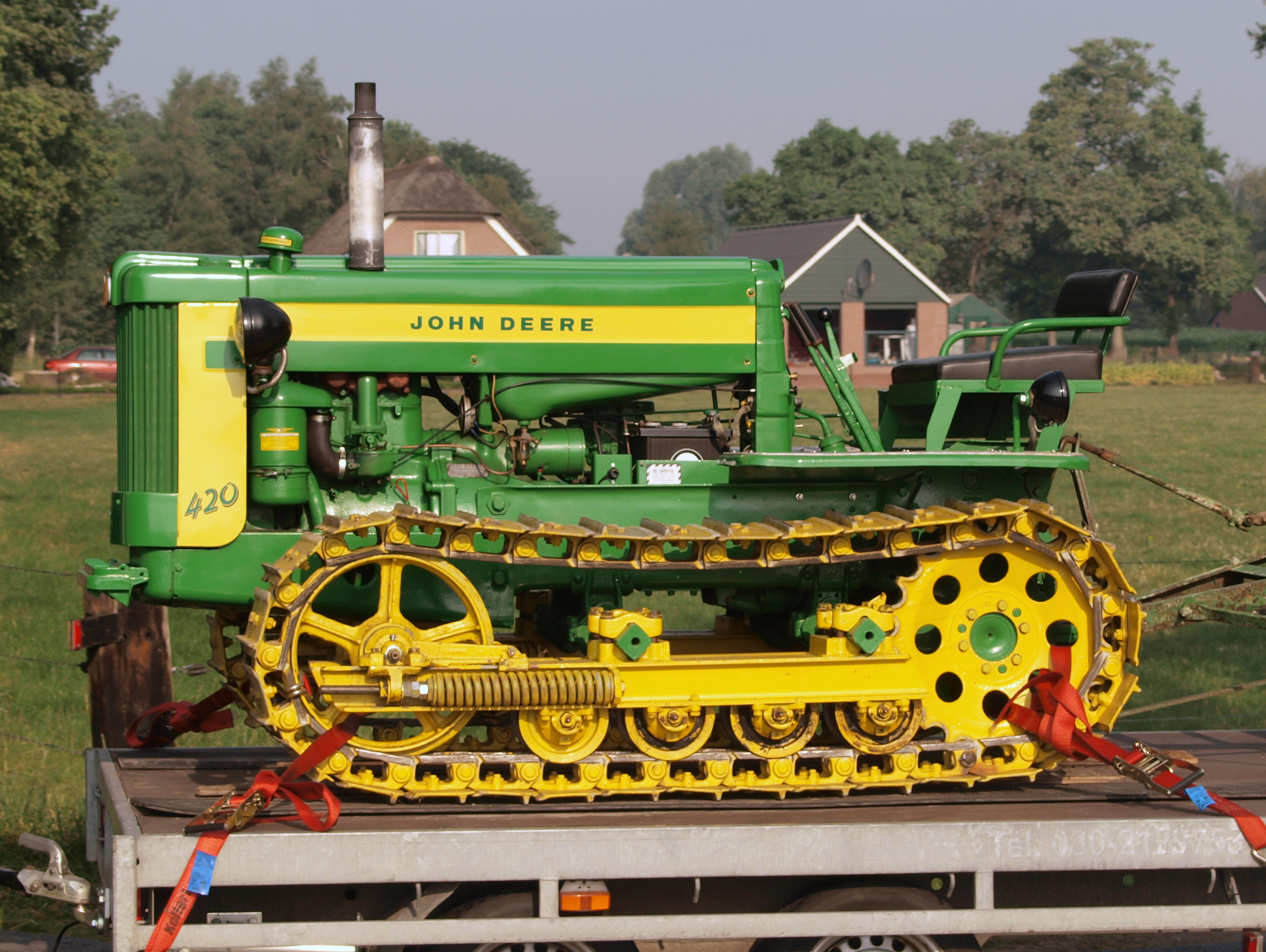
John Deere 420 crawler

The John Deere 420 was the direct follow-on to the 40, covering the higher end of the range. Changes from the 40 to the 420 were minimal, but power was increased by 20% with a larger bore, higher compression and an improved carburetor. The 420 was rated for two plows.

=== John Deere 430 ===
The John Deere 430 was an ergonomically-improved version of the 420, introduced in 1958. Production ended in 1960, when the John Deere 1010 was introduced to replace it, with a new four-cylinder engine.

=== John Deere 435 ===
The John Deere 435 was a 430RCU equipped with a two-cycle two-cylinder General Motors diesel engine. Production ran through 1959 and 1960. The 435 was rated for three plows. 4,626 435s were produced at Dubuque, selling for abo9ut $3,000.

=== John Deere 440 ===
The John Deere 440 was the industrial variant of the 430RCU and 435 wheeled tractors, and the 430C crawler. Production of the 440 ran from 1958 to 1960.

=== John Deere 320 ===
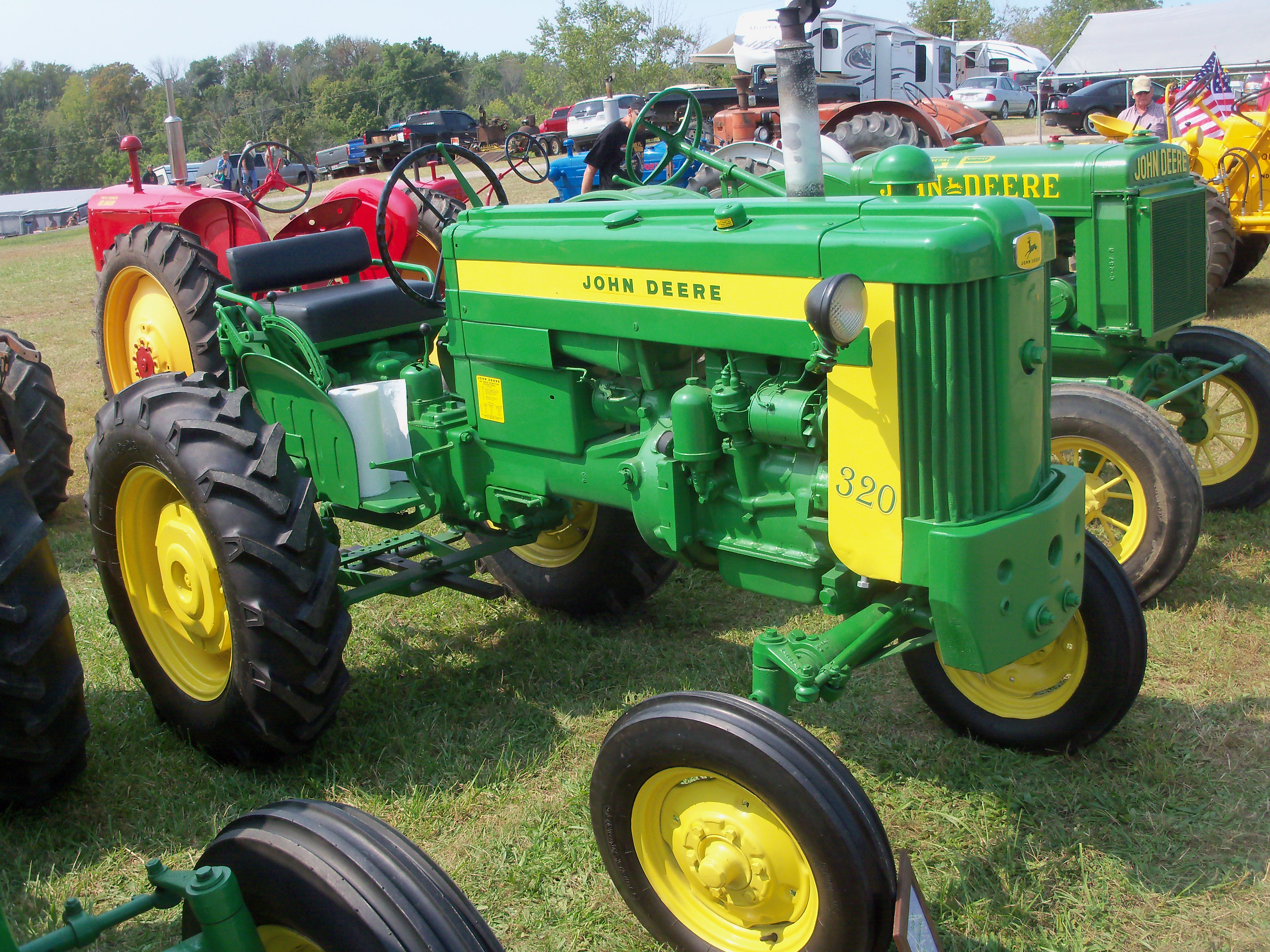
John Deere 320S

From 1955 the 40 was replaced at the lower end by the John Deere 320, with new styling. The 320 occupied the position in the line that was vacated when the 420 had appeared with greater power. The 320 continued with the M's transmission and the 40's engine. The 320 came in a standard row-crop version, and a utility version.

=== John Deere 330 ===
In 1958 the John Deere 330 was introduced, with minimal changes from the 320. It was the last two-cylinder Deere model to be produced, concluding production in 1960.
