= John Deere Model A =

Row crop tractor

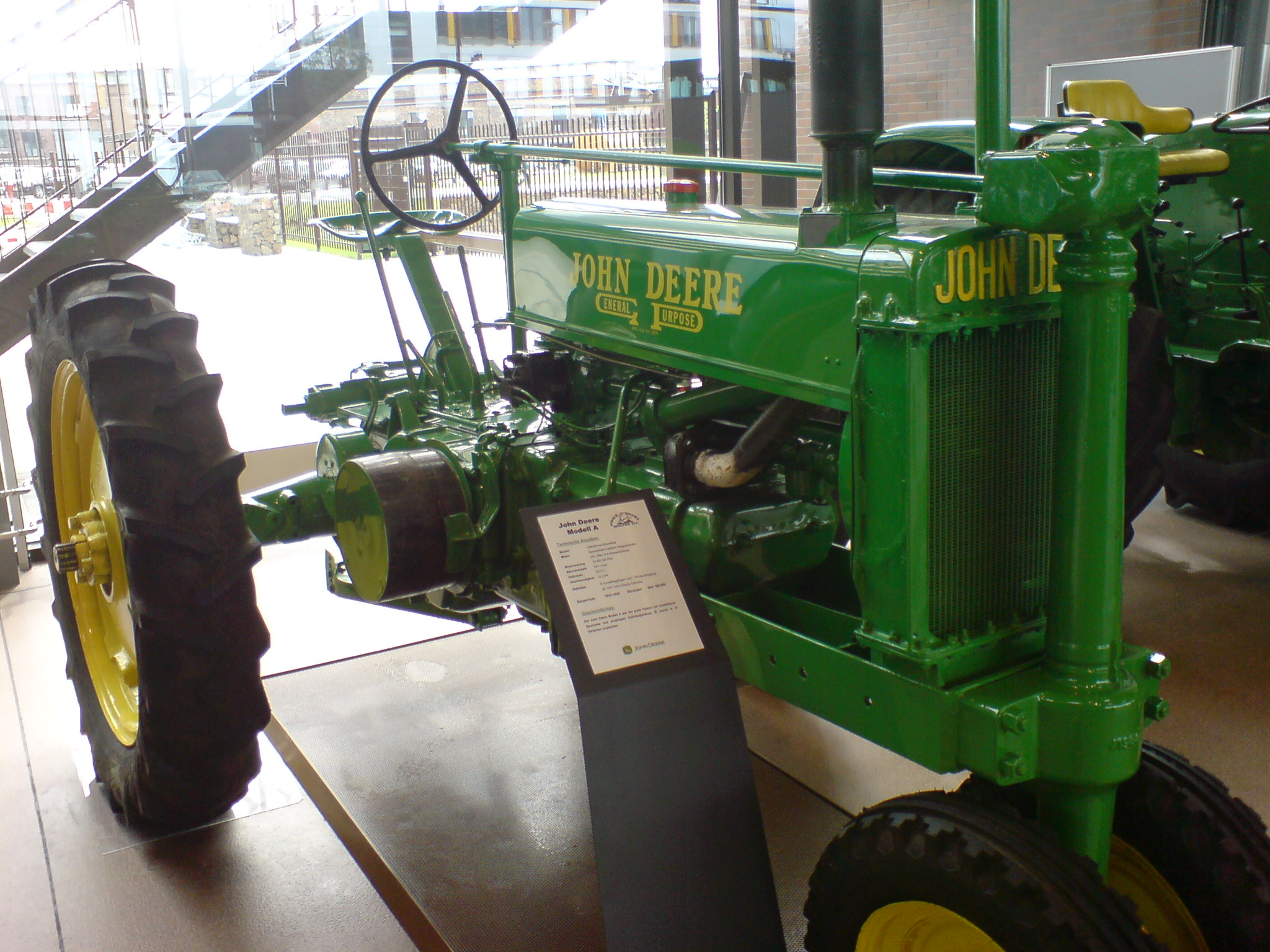
- Unstyled John Deere Model A
- Type: Row-crop agricultural tractor
- Manufacturer: John Deere
- Production: 1934-1952
- Length: 124 inches (310 cm)
- Width: 83 inches (210 cm)
- Height: 60 inches (150 cm)
- Weight: 3,783 pounds (1,716 kg)
- Propulsion: Rear wheels
- Engine model: JD 2-cylinder
- Gross power: 26 horsepower (19 kW)
- PTO power: 24.71 horsepower (18.43 kW) (belt)
- Drawbar power: 18.72 horsepower (13.96 kW)
- Drawbar pull: 2,923 pounds (1,326 kg)
- NTTL test: 222
- Succeeded by: John Deere 60

The John Deere Model A is a row crop tractor manufactured by Deere & Company. The A was produced in a wide variety of versions for special-purpose cultivation. It received a styling upgrade in 1939 and electric starting in 1947. With the advent of John Deere's numerical model numbering system, the A became the John Deere 60, and later the 620 and 630, 3010, 3020, 4030, 4040, 4050, 4055, and ended with the 7610.

== Description and production ==
The Model A was intended to directly compete with McCormick's Farmall tractors. With over 290,000 sold by the end of its original production in 1952, it was a popular tractor that used Deere & Company's two cylinder engine. The 'Tracking the Deere' meeting of John Deere enthusiasts, which took place in Lincoln, Nebraska in 1991, recorded a production of 327,460 units of the Model A.

Early tractors burnt distillate, a petroleum byproduct similar to kerosene, which became a selling point owing to the fuel's low price. Deere & Company's two cylinder design sprang from keeping costs low, improving their current engine rather than develop a new engine. These engines made a very distinctive sound giving them the nickname "Johnny Poppers"

In 1938, the tractors received styled hood and grilles, designed by Henry Dreyfuss. Tractors from 1939 to 1946 were known as "early styled", and tractors from 1947 to 1952 were termed "late styled". Pre-1939 tractors were termed "unstyled".

Variants on the A included the AO (for use in orchards), AI (for industrial use), AN (with a single front wheel), AW (with a wide front). The AN and AW further varied into models with high crop applications, the ANH and AWH, respectively. The AR was the non-row-crop version.

All were manufactured at the John Deere factory in Waterloo, Iowa, where 65,031 were built, selling for about $2,400.

=== John Deere 60 ===
The A was succeeded with minimal changes by the John Deere 60 in 1952 when Deere changed to using numbers instead of letters. The engine was upgraded for more power, and LP gas was a fuel option, as well as an optional 3-point hitch and a live power take-off. The 60 also had an upgraded operation station as well as an upgraded hydraulic system. The 60 was the most popular tractor of its series. In 1954 the 60 was equipped with power steering and updated rims, 52's and 53's had " window wheel rims". Original price was $2,500 in 1956. The 60 was replaced by the John Deere 620 in late 1956. "Low-seat" 60s were equivalent to the AR, and "high-seat" 60s were the row-crop version. The Orchard 60 (O-60) was an additional variant for fruit growers, using the A powertrain. Only 530 "All-Fuel" O-60's were made, 285 gasoline O-60's, and only 45 LP Gas O-60's.

=== John Deere 620 ===
The 60's replacement was the John Deere 620, in 1956. Engine power was increased again by reducing engine stroke by 0.375 in (9.5 mm), increasing the rpm. The Orchard 620 or O-620 used the new 620 engine and remained in production after the 630 was introduced. It was the only "20" series tractor in production after 1958.

=== John Deere 630 ===
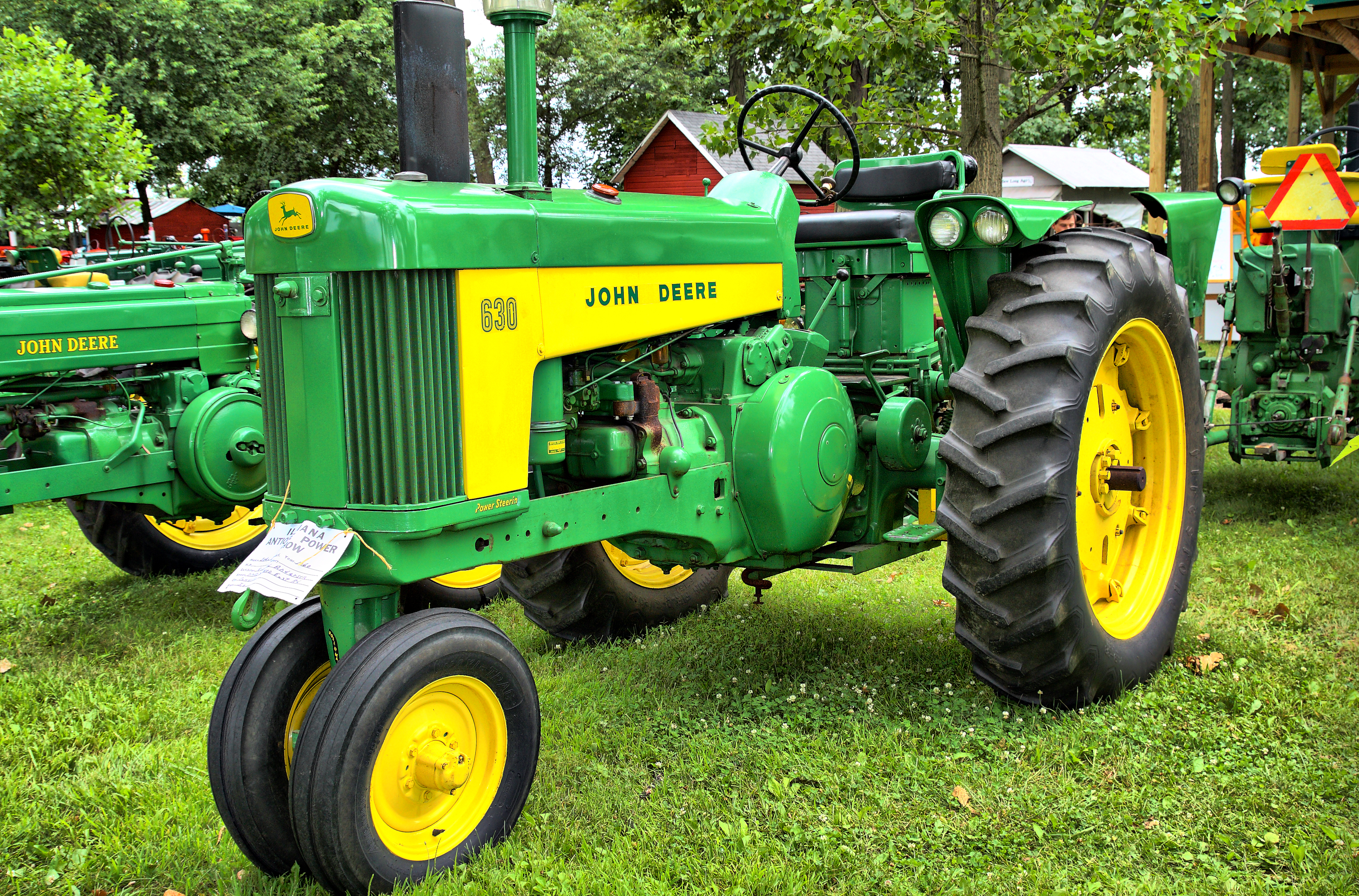
John Deere 630

The John Deere 630 followed in 1958, with no mechanical changes. The only changes were more refined decal visuals, updated muffler, air intake, hood design, and dashboard. Production ended in 1960. The 630 was replaced by the four-cylinder John Deere 3010.

== See also ==
- John Deere B
- John Deere H
- John Deere G
