= John Deere Model GP =

Row crop tractor

John Deere GP
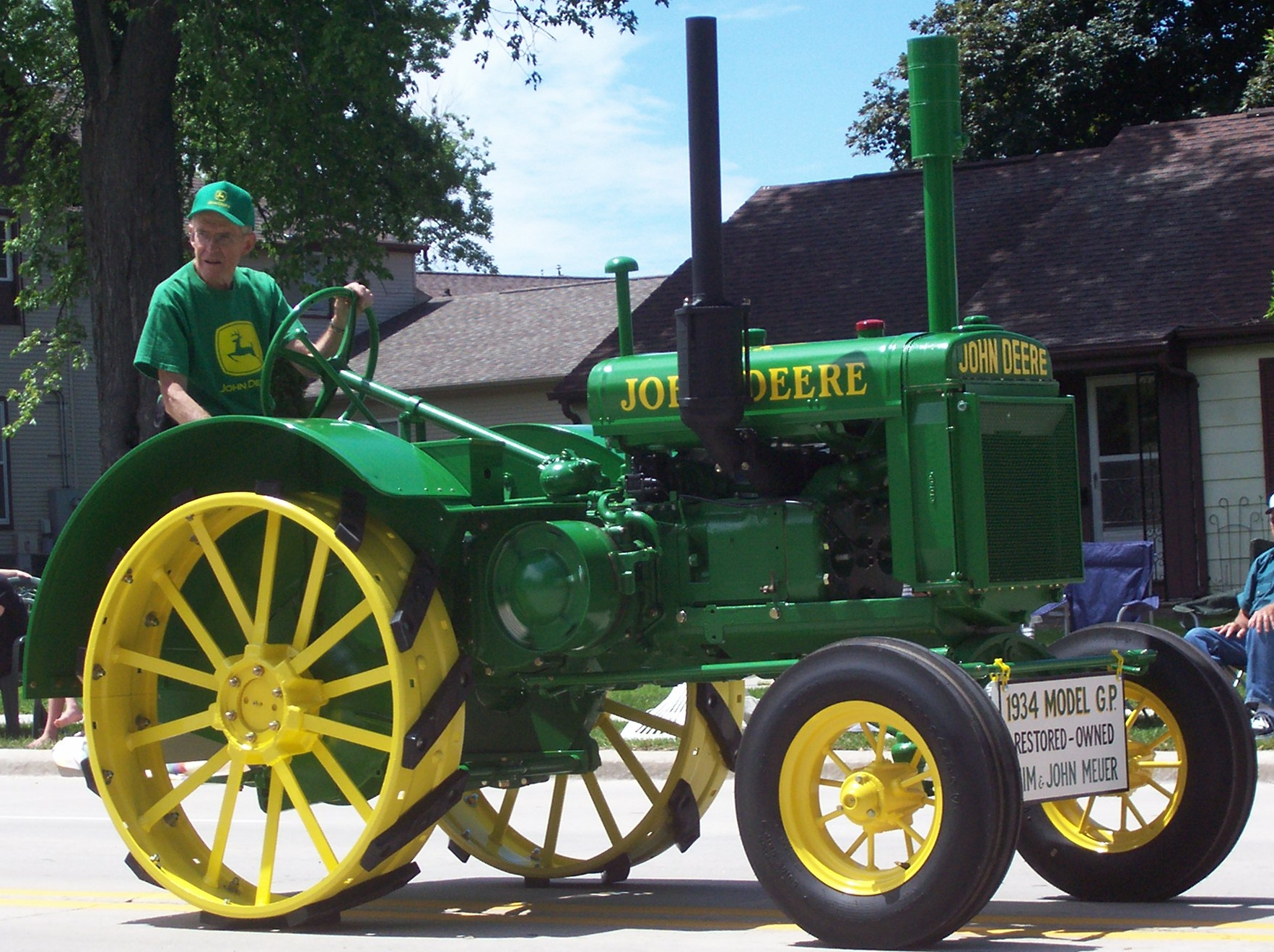
- 1934 John Deere GP
- Type: Row-crop agricultural tractor
- Manufacturer: John Deere
- Production: 1928-1935
- Length: 112 inches (280 cm)
- Height: 55.5 inches (141 cm) to steering wheel)
- Weight: 3,600 pounds (1,600 kg)
- Propulsion: Rear wheels
- Gross power: 22 horsepower (16 kW)
- PTO power: 24.97 horsepower (18.62 kW) (belt)
- Drawbar power: 17.24 horsepower (12.86 kW)
- Drawbar pull: 2,489 pounds (1,129 kg)
- NTTL test: 153

The John Deere Model GP tractor was a two-plow, and later a three-plow row-crop tractor produced by John Deere from 1928 to 1935. Initially called the John Deere Model C, the name was changed to GP as a result of difficulties in distinguishing between the Model C and Model D over the telephones of the time. It was intended as a response to the Farmall Regular line of general-purpose tractors produced under the Farmall brand by International Harvester.

== Description and production ==
The original C was first produced in 1927. Intended as a general-purpose row-crop tractor to compete with the Farmall line, the tractor had a wide arched front axle to straddle three rows of crops In 1928 the tractor was renamed the GP, following confusion in distinguishing between "C" and "D" over the telephone. The C's innovations included a mechanical implement lift and front and rear power take-offs. The GP used a horizontal side-by-side 312-cubic-inch (5,110 cc) two-cylinder engine, giving 17 horsepower (13 kW) of drawbar horsepower, and 25 horsepower (19 kW) by belt, allowing a two-plow rating. The GP had a three-speed transmission. Both gasoline and kerosene-fueled versions were available. All GPs were manufactured at the John Deere factory in Waterloo, Iowa, where 30,535 were built.

A two-row version, the GPWT (GP wide-tread) was introduced in 1930 with a tricycle configuration, featuring close-set front wheels. By 1931 the GP's engine had 339-cubic-inch (5,560 cc) displacement, for 18.86-horsepower (14.06 kW) drawbar and 25.36-horsepower (18.91 kW) measurements, allowing a three-plow rating. This also allowed the elimination of water injection, which had been used in the smaller engines to avoid pre-detonation.

The GPWT was introduced in 1932, 6 inches (15 cm) longer, with a simplified steering system that was arranged over the engine.

== Variants ==
The Model P was produced specifically for potato cultivation from 1930 to 1931 with a 68-inch (170 cm) rear wheel tread. Later models of the GP could be fitted with adapters to achieve the same result. The GPO was adapted for orchard work, with lower axles. The GPO-L was a tracked version.
