= John Deere Model R =

Agricultural tractor

John Deere R
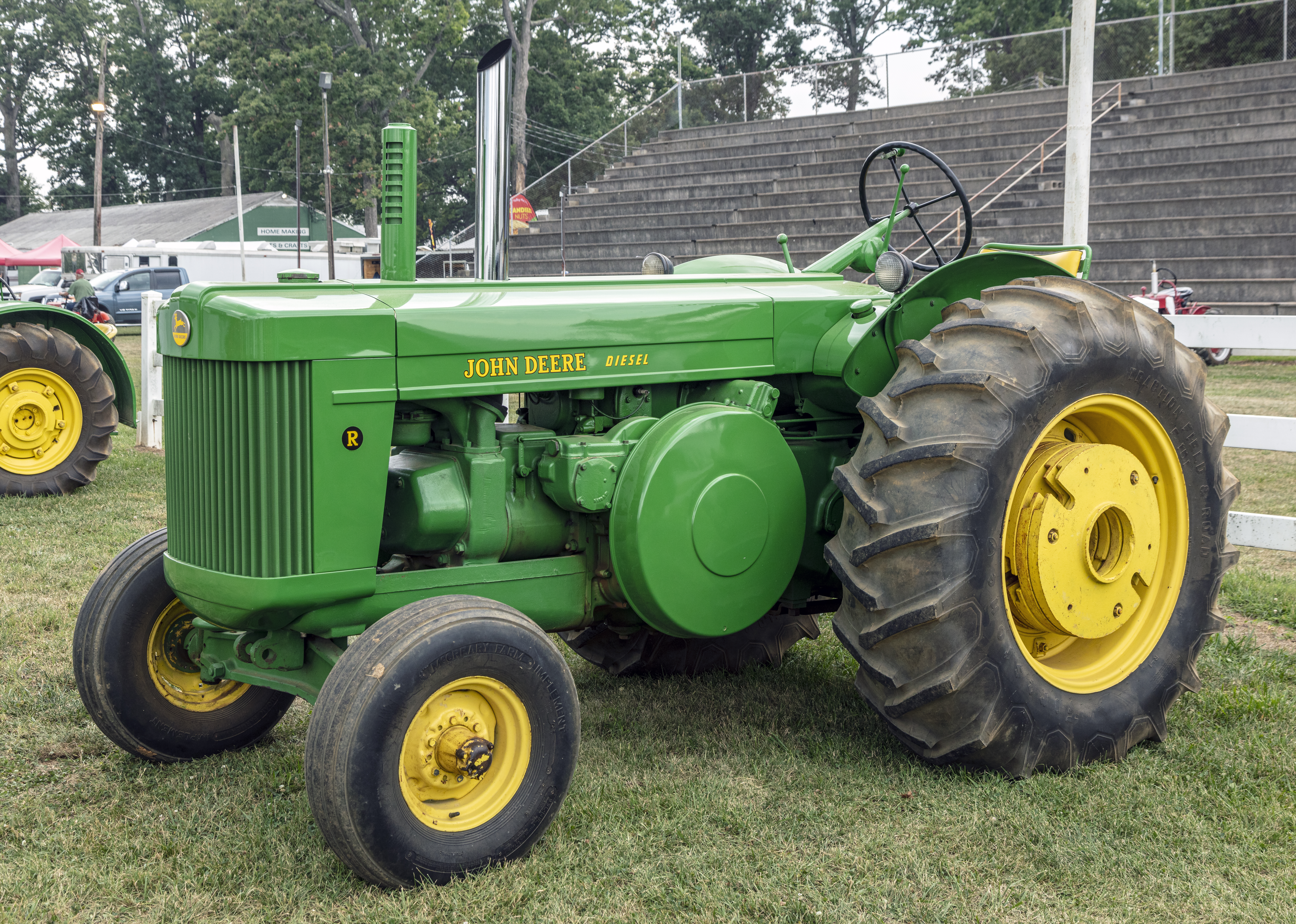
- John Deere R
- Type: Standard agricultural tractor
- Manufacturer: John Deere
- Production: 1949-1954
- Length: 147 inches (370 cm)
- Width: 79.5 inches (202 cm)
- Height: 78.175 inches (198.56 cm)
- Weight: 7,603 pounds (3,449 kg)
- Propulsion: Rear wheels
- Gross power: 47 horsepower (35 kW)
- PTO power: 48.58 horsepower (36.23 kW) (belt)
- Drawbar power: 43.15 horsepower (32.18 kW)
- Drawbar pull: 6,644 pounds (3,014 kg)
- NTTL test: 406
- Preceded by: John Deere Model D
- Succeeded by: John Deere 80

The John Deere Model R tractor was John Deere's first diesel tractor. A large, heavy tractor, it had fixed wheel widths and was not produced as a row-crop tractor with adjustable axles. The R was followed in the John Deere numbered model series by the John Deere 80, 820 and 830 tractors, which represented evolutionary upgrades to the basic R.

== Description and production ==
The R was the successor to the Model D standard-tread tractor. The R had a two-cylinder side-by-side diesel engine of 415.5-cubic-inch (6,809 cc) displacement. The R required a starter motor, which was also a two-cylinder engine, horizontally opposed, burning gasoline to warm up the primary engine. The pony engine had electric start. In addition to being the first Deere diesel tractor, the R was the first to have a "live" power take-off, with its own clutch allowing independent control of the PTO. A cab option was available for the R.

The Model R was produced at the John Deere factory in Waterloo, Iowa. 21,293 were built, at a selling price of about $3,600.

=== John Deere 80 ===
From 1955 the R was replaced by the John Deere 80 with substantially increased power and a six-speed transmission. The gasoline starting engine for the diesel engines was updated from a two-cylinder opposed arrangement to a V-4. However, the new model was announced late in Deere's product cycle, and only about 3,500 were built before the next model was announced, the 820.

=== John Deere 820 ===
From 1956 the 80 was replaced by the John Deere 820. The 820 differed primarily in styling, with Deere's latest paint scheme and larger fenders. The brakes were enlarged with the 820 as well. In 1957 a larger, more powerful engine was introduced.

An industrial version of the 820 was produced, as well as the 820 Rice Special with special bearings and wheels. The 820 could be ordered with an enclosed cab.

=== John Deere 830 ===
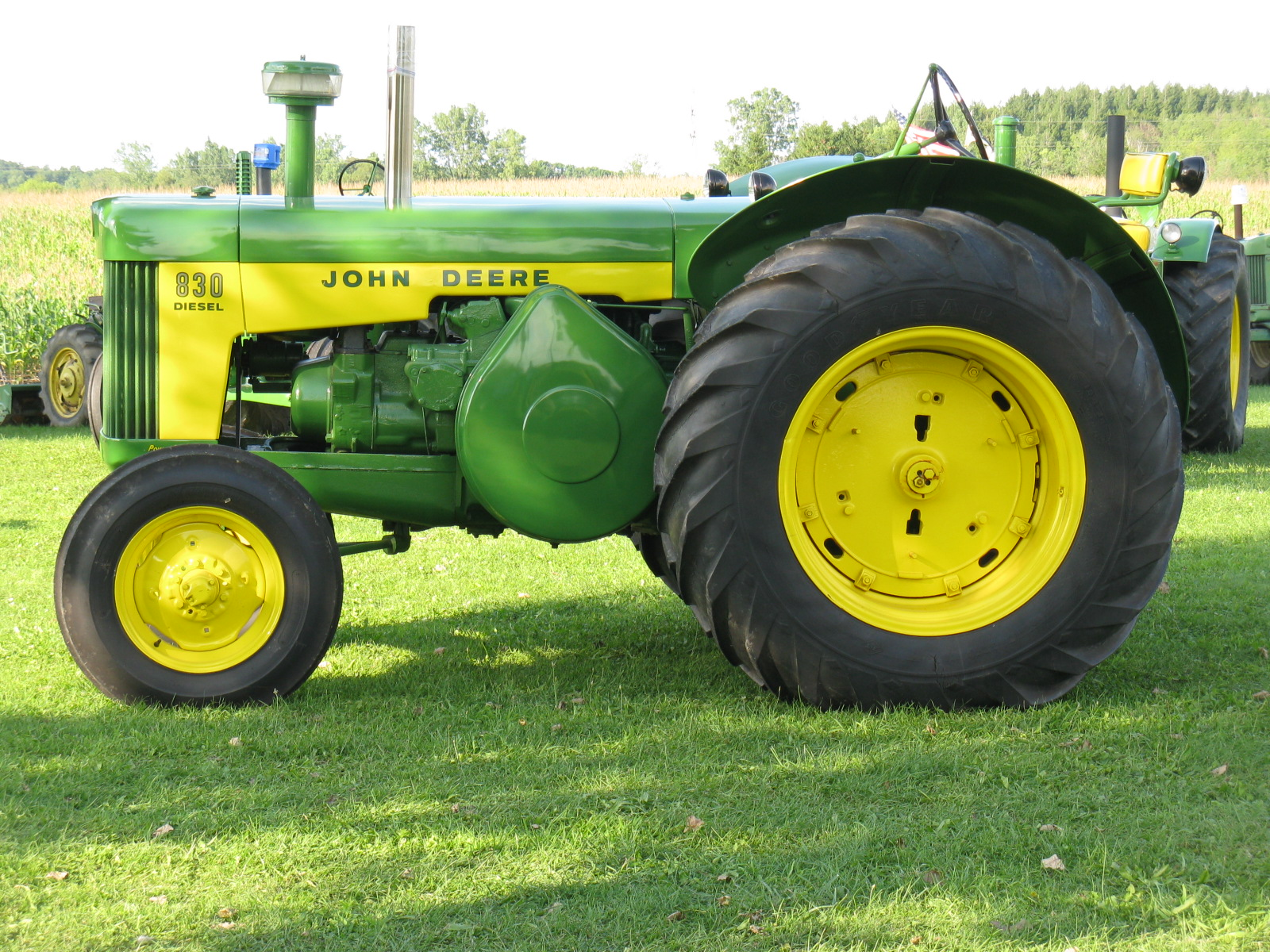
John Deere 830

In 1959 the John Deere 830 was introduced. It maintained the same powertrain as the 820. An electric start in lieu of the gasoline starting engine was offered for the standard wheatland models, and the Rice Special model was continued. Production ended in 1960.

820s and 830s were produced at Waterloo. 7,080 were manufactured, at a sales price of about $7,000.
