= Farmall F-20 =

Row crop tractor

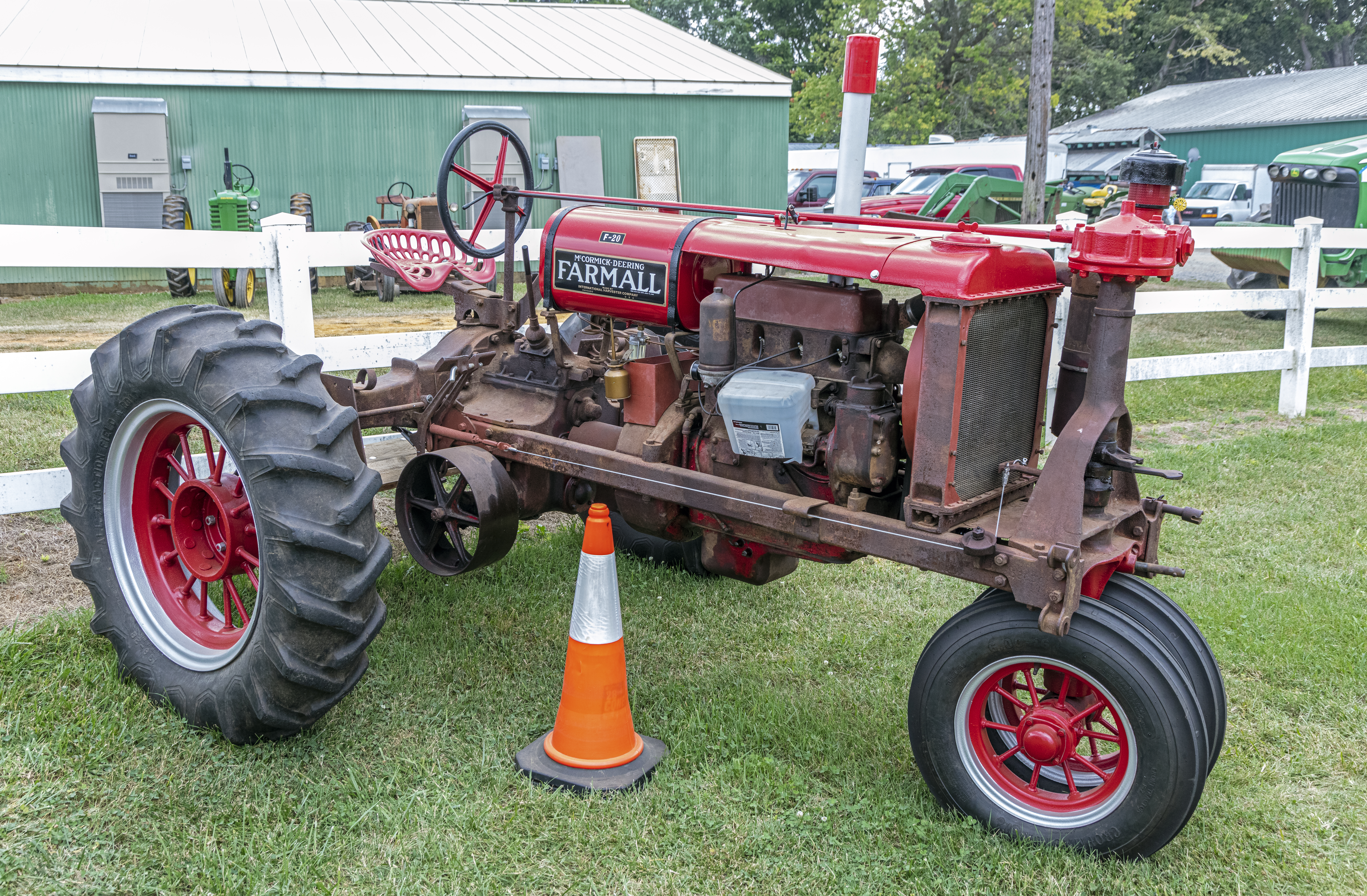
- Farmall F-20
- Type: Row-crop agricultural tractor
- Manufacturer: International Harvester
- Production: 1932-1939
- Length: 140 inches (360 cm)
- Width: 86 inches (220 cm)
- Height: 67 inches (170 cm) to steering wheel)
- Weight: 4,500 pounds (2,000 kg)
- Propulsion: Rear wheels
- Gross power: 29 horsepower (22 kW)
- PTO power: 23.11 horsepower (17.23 kW) (belt)
- Drawbar power: 15.39 horsepower (11.48 kW)
- Drawbar pull: 2,334 pounds (1,059 kg)
- NTTL test: 221
- Preceded by: Farmall Regular
- Succeeded by: Farmall H

The Farmall F-20 is a medium-sized two-plow row crop tractor produced by International Harvester under the Farmall brand from 1932 to 1939, with approximately 148,000 produced. It replaced the Farmall Regular, and was itself replaced in 1939 by the Farmall H.

== Description and production ==
The F-20 was a modernization of the earlier Farmall Regular. It had a more powerful engine, improved narrow front wheels and a four-cylinder overhead valve engine with 29 horsepower (22 kW), feeding a four-gear sliding-gear transmission. The F-20 name implied that the machine could pull two plows. Versions were available for distillate and kerosene fuels. Gasoline was not an option, except to start the engine. The rear portal axle used drop gears to raise the clearance underneath the tractor higher than a simple axle would allow. A wide front axle was available as an option. The first tractors were delivered with steel wheels, with pneumatic tires being offered in 1933. Early-year F-20s were painted gray, like the Regular. Beginning in 1936 the F-20 was painted bright red, to increase visibility; this quickly became a trademark of the Farmall line. About 148,000 were produced during the product run. Purchase prices were between $895 and $1,000.

== Variants ==
A version with high clearance, a narrow rear wheelset and wide front wheels was produced for sugar cane cultivation, known as the F-20 Cane Tractor.

== Comparable product ==
The John Deere Model A was a comparable model from John Deere.
