= John Deere Model B =

Row crop tractor

John Deere B
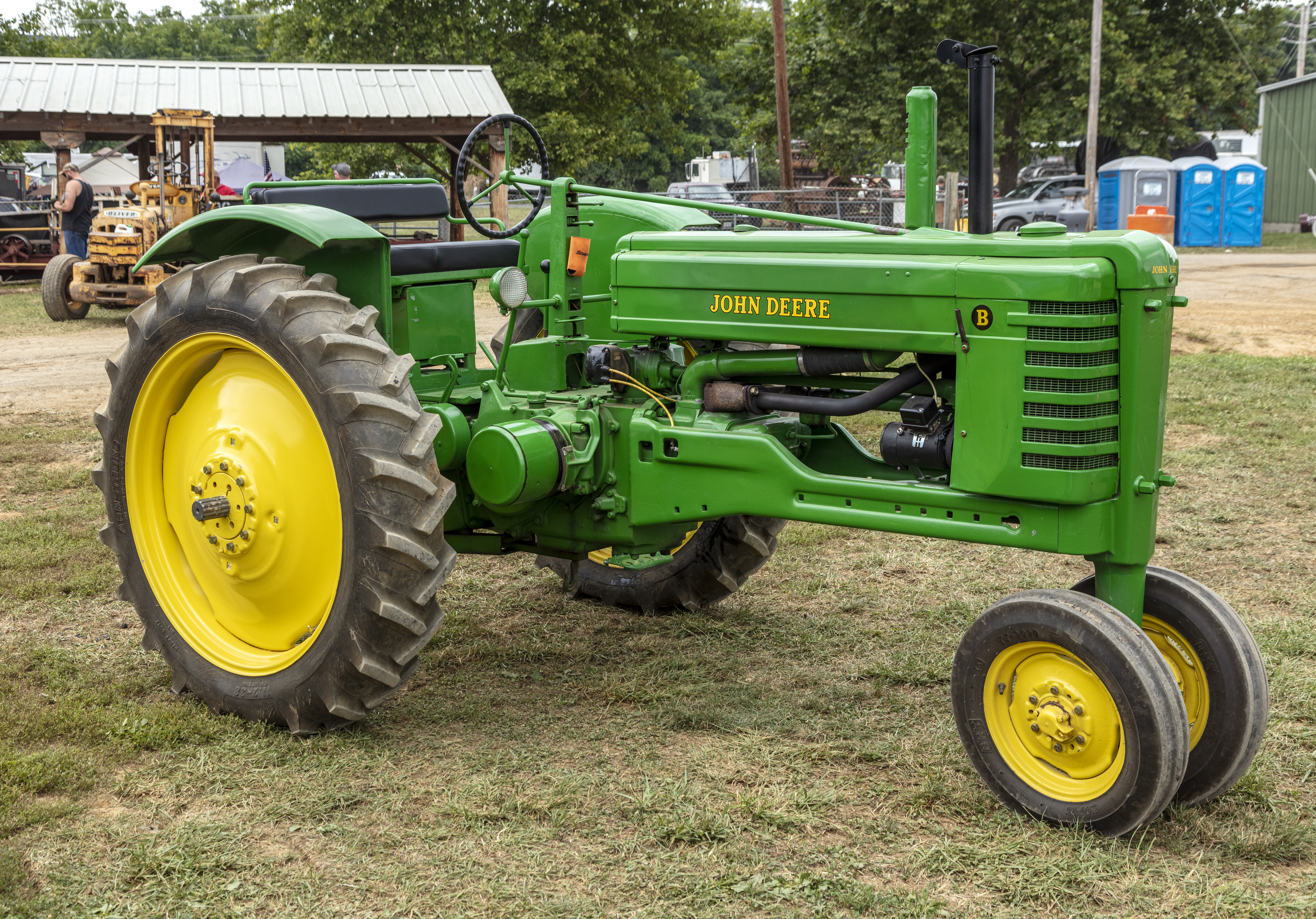
- Styled John Deere B
- Type: Row-crop agricultural tractor
- Manufacturer: John Deere
- Production: 1935-1938 (Unstyled),1939-1947 (Wartime/Early-Styled), 1948-1952 (Late-Styled)
- Length: 120.5 inches (306 cm)
- Width: 85 inches (220 cm)
- Height: 56 inches (140 cm) (to steering wheel)
- Weight: 3,275 pounds (1,486 kg)
- Propulsion: Rear wheels
- Gross power: 17 horsepower (13 kW)
- PTO power: 16.01 horsepower (11.94 kW) (belt)
- Drawbar power: 11.80 horsepower (8.80 kW)
- Drawbar pull: 1,728 pounds (784 kg)
- NTTL test: 232

The John Deere Model B tractor was a two-plow row-crop tractor produced by John Deere from 1935 to 1952, with direct successors produced until 1960. The B was a scaled-down, less expensive version of the John Deere Model A. It was followed by the updated 50, 520 and 530 models.

== Description and production ==
The B was first produced in 1935. It was a general-purpose row-crop tractor, less expensive than the Model A at about two thirds the A's size. As with most row-crop tractors, the spacing between the rear wheels could be adjusted to suit row spacings, and the front wheels were offered with wide and narrow wheel arrangements. The B could work two plows. The tractor was equipped with a two-cylinder side-by-side 17-horsepower (13 kW) engine, of 149-cubic-inch (2,440 cc) displacement. Both gasoline and kerosene-fueled versions were available.

The BN, a single front wheel version, was introduced in 1935, together with a wide front axle version, the BW. The BR standard tread tractor was introduced in 1936 as well, with fixed axle widths and a lower profile, for farming uses that did not involve row-crop cultivation. An orchard version, the BO, and an industrial tractor version, the BI, were also produced. The BR and BO ended production in 1947, with the BI ending production in 1941. Meanwhile the John Deere AR and AO continued until 1952. For compatibility with Model A cultivation accessories, the frame was extended in 1937, referred to as "long-frame" Bs. High-crop versions of all subtypes were offered beginning the same year, with various combinations of letter designations.

The BO-L was a crawler version, produced from 1943 to 1946.

From 1938 a more attractive engine housing and grille, designed by Henry Dreyfuss, enclosed the engine, radiator and steering gear. These were called "styled" tractors. Electric start and lighting were added in 1940. Further updates in 1947 mirrored those of the A, with improvements to operator comfort and a larger engine that produced 15% more power. Tractors produced from 1947 onward were referred to as "late-styled." The B was produced until 1952. All Bs were manufactured at the John Deere factory in Waterloo, Iowa, where 40,057 were built, with a sale price of about $1,900.

=== John Deere 50 ===
From 1952 the B was replaced by the John Deere 50. with updated styling and a cast frame. Power was increased by 10 percent with the same engine, and a rack-and-pinion rear wheel adjustment was provided, along with live hydraulics and power take-off. Fuel options included gasoline, all-fuel and LP gas. 32,574 50s were built at Waterloo, selling for about $2,000.

=== John Deere 520 ===
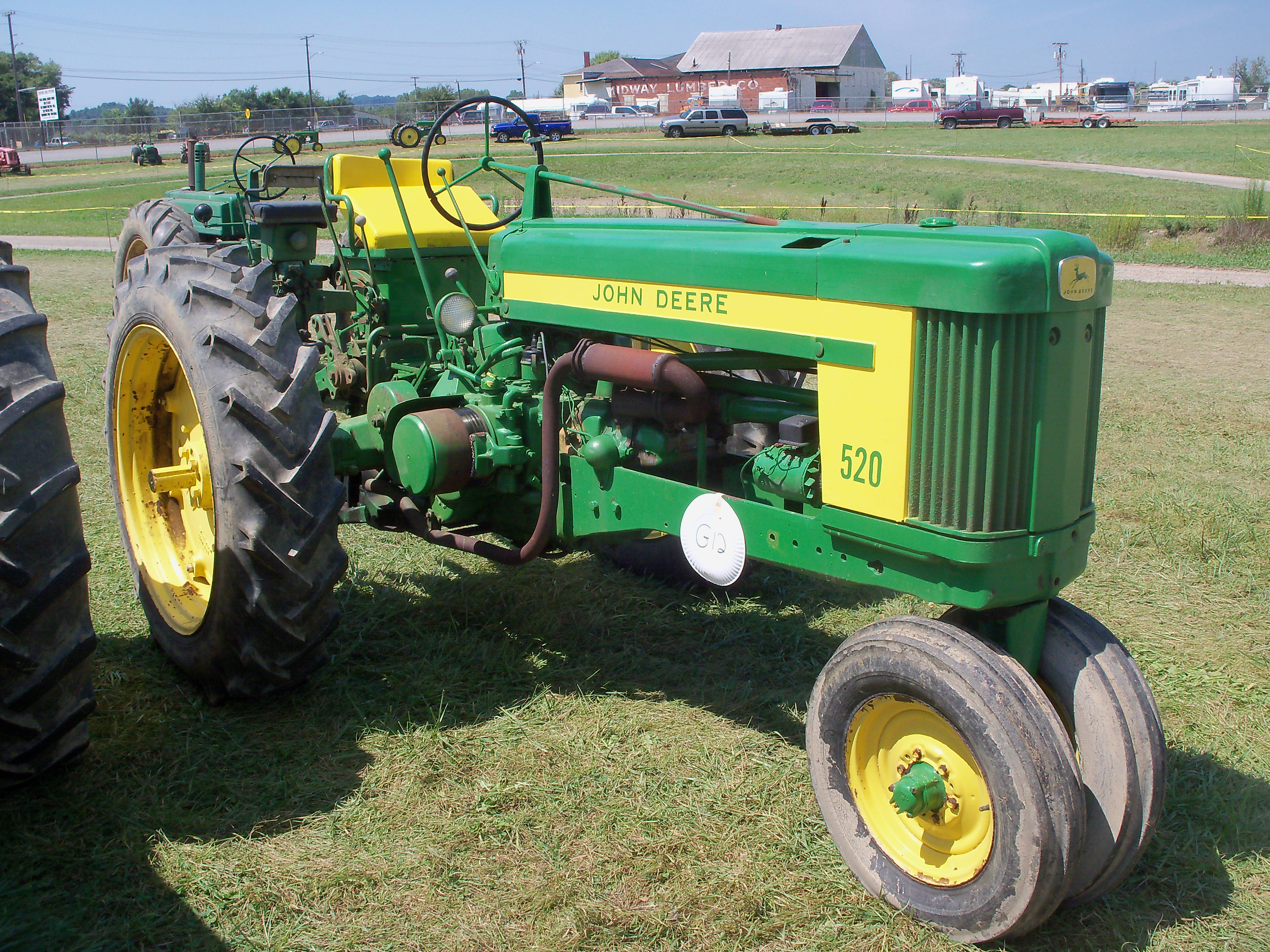
John Deere 520

From 1957 the 50 was replaced by the John Deere 520. with new styling. Power output was increased 20%, with a new two-cylinder engine, to the point that the 520 could work three plows. Only row-crop versions were produced, with the same fuels as the 50.

=== John Deere 530 ===
In 1958 the John Deere 530 was introduced. As with the 520, the 530 was produced only as a row-crop tractor. Fenders with four headlights were optional, and an option was available for power adjustment to rear wheel track width.
