= John Deere Model L =

Row crop tractor

John Deere L
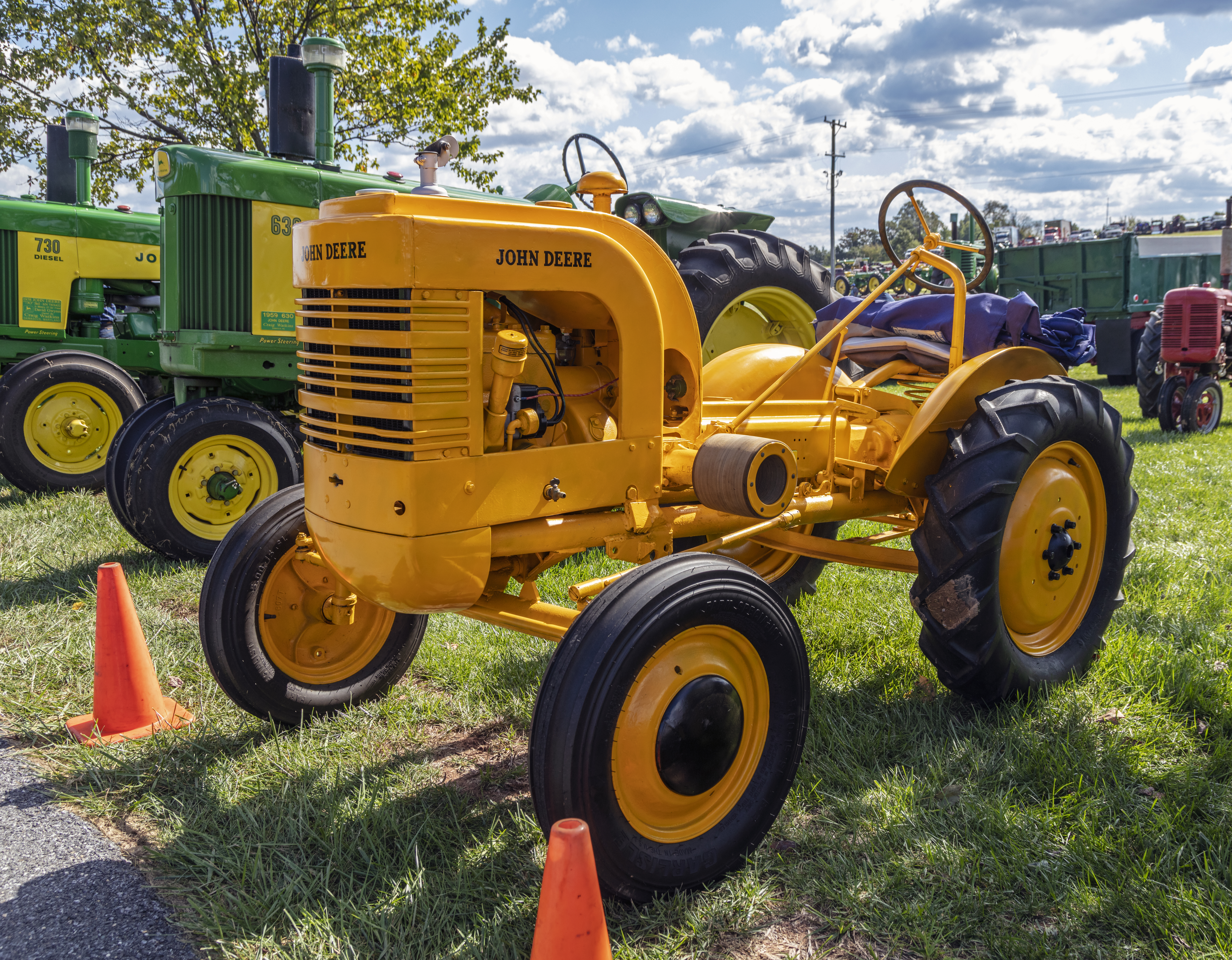
- A John Deere LI
- Type: Small agricultural tractor
- Manufacturer: John Deere
- Production: 1937-1946
- Length: 91 inches (230 cm)
- Width: 49 inches (120 cm)
- Height: 57 inches (140 cm) (to steering wheel)
- Weight: 1,515 pounds (687 kg)
- Propulsion: Rear wheels
- Gross power: 10 horsepower (7.5 kW)
- PTO power: 10.42 horsepower (7.77 kW) (belt)
- Drawbar power: 9.06 horsepower (6.76 kW)
- Drawbar pull: 1,235 pounds (560 kg)
- NTTL test: 313

The John Deere Model L tractor was an American small one-plow row-crop tractor produced by John Deere from 1937 to 1946.

== Description and production ==
The L was first produced in 1937. Unlike most John Deere tractors, it was designed in John Deere's Dubuque Wagon Works plant in Dubuque, Iowa, and did not resemble previous Deere products. It departed further from tradition by using a non-Deere engine, a Hercules two-cylinder engine mounted in line, rather than transversely, as had been traditional, mated to a three-speed Ford transmission, with the engine mounted far forward over the wide-set front wheels. This created a distinctive empty gap between the engine and operator. Late 1938 models were restyled in line with other Deere tractors, with Henry Dreyfuss cowlings and grilles. In 1940. the 14-horsepower (10 kW) LA was introduced, using a John Deere engine, and the L received a Deere engine in lieu of the Hercules. The LA introduced a power take-off to the L line. Both the L and LA were produced at the same time. Ls and LAs used only gasoline as fuel. Production ended in 1946.

== Variants ==
A high-clearance version was available. Special plowing, mowing and cultivating accessories were produced for the L tractors. A lower and wider industrial version, the LI, was introduced in 1941, usually employed as a mower.
