= John Deere Model D =

Agricultural tractor

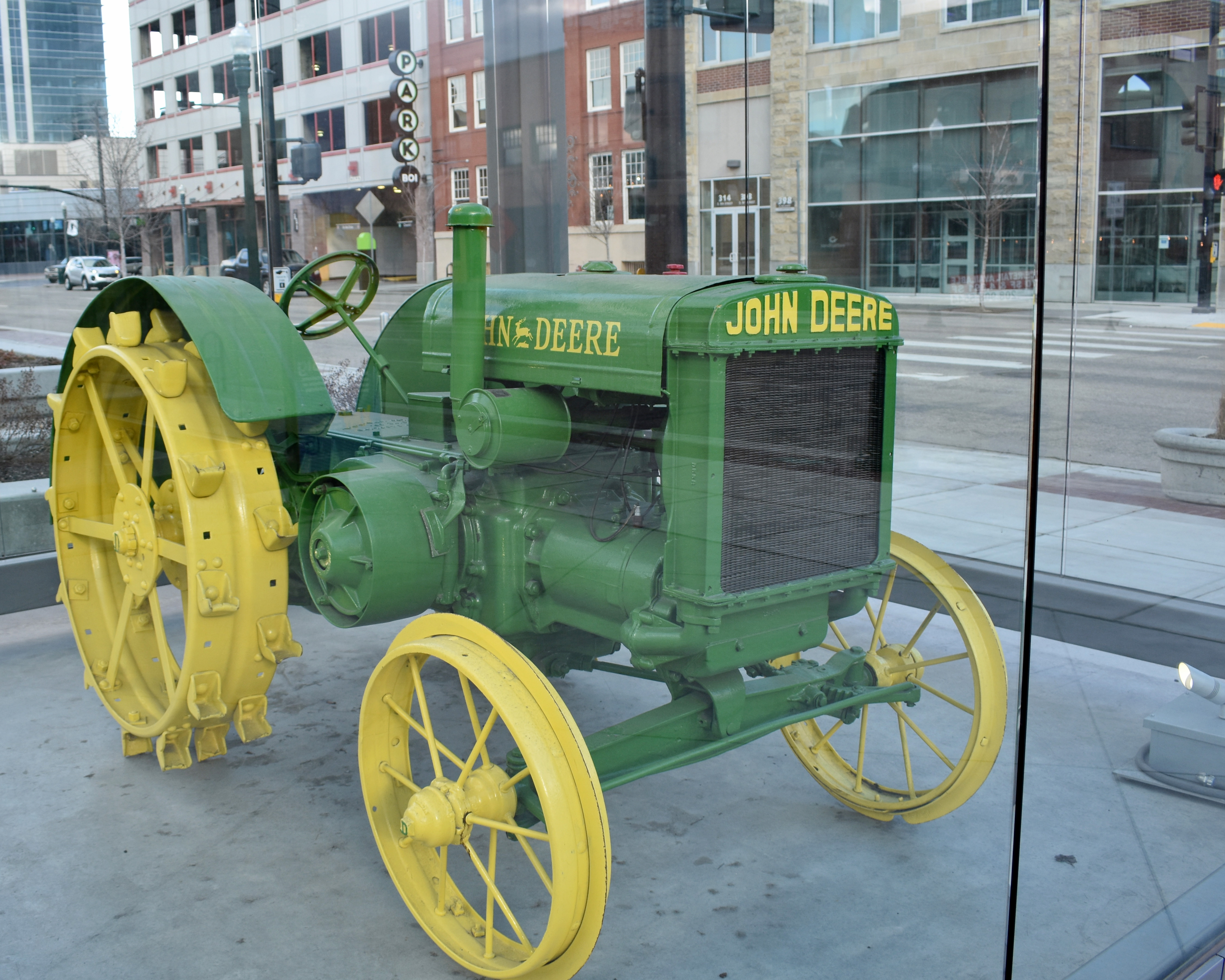
- Unstyled John Deere D on display
- Type: Row-crop agricultural tractor
- Manufacturer: John Deere
- Production: 1923-1953
- Length: 135 inches (340 cm)
- Width: 84 inches (210 cm)
- Height: 61.5 inches (156 cm) (to steering wheel)
- Weight: 5,000 pounds (2,300 kg)
- Propulsion: Rear wheels
- Gross power: 34 horsepower (25 kW)
- PTO power: 30.40 horsepower (22.67 kW) (belt)
- Drawbar power: 22.53 horsepower (16.80 kW)
- Drawbar pull: 3,277 pounds (1,486 kg)
- NTTL test: 102
- Succeeded by: John Deere Model R

The John Deere Model D tractor was a large standard tractor produced by John Deere from 1923 to 1953. Unlike other John Deere letter-series tractors, it kept the "D" designation throughout production, and never changed to a number designation. The D had the longest model run of any John Deere tractor. It was succeeded by the John Deere Model R.

== Description and production ==
The Model D was John Deere's first mass-produced tractor, and was released to the public in 1923. It was a standard tread tractor with fixed wheel widths, as opposed to the adjustable wheels of a row-crop tractor. The D was initially equipped with a two-cylinder side-by-side 30-horsepower (22 kW) engine, of 465-cubic-inch (7,620 cc) displacement, updated in 1927 to a 501-cubic-inch (8,210 cc) engine. Early models had a two-speed transmission. The earlier D tractors can be sorted into three major eras based on the style of flywheel used. The "Spoker" style was produced from 1923 to 1926, and as the nickname suggests, the flywheel had spokes like a wagon wheel. Due to the hazard presented by a spoked wheel rotating at a high speed, a solid flywheel was introduced in 1926. These had small stress-relief holes in the flywheel, earning them the "nickel" moniker. The "nickel" flywheels had problems with cracking which were solved by increasing the size of the holes and slots, and these improved flywheels were introduced later in 1926.

In 1930 the engine was increased in power, and in 1934 a three-speed transmission was introduced. Specialized orchard models (DO), half-track and fully-tracked crawler models were also produced, along with the DI industrial tractor. By 1935 steel wheels were being phased out in favor of rubber tires on most models, and had never been used for the DI models, which required higher road travel speeds than could be borne with steel wheels. The D was equipped as an all-fuel tractor, able to operate with gasoline, kerosene, or distillate. All Ds were manufactured at the John Deere factory in Waterloo, Iowa, where 55,929 were built.

In 1939 the D received the Deere brand-wide styling changes designed by Henry Dreyfuss, with updated hoods and grilles. An optional power take-off was offered. After the longest production run for any single model made by John Deere, the Model D was replaced by the Model R in 1949.
