= 1066 (disambiguation) =

1066 is a year in history.

== History ==
- Battle of Stamford Bridge, a battle on September 25, 1066, between an English army under King Harold Godwinson and an invading Norwegian force under King Harald Hardrada
- Battle of Hastings, a battle on October 14, 1066, between the English army under King Harold Godwinson, and the French-Norman army under William, Duke of Normandy

== Fiction and dramatisations ==
- 1066 and All That, a 1930 book that parodies English history textbooks
- 1066 The Battle for Middle Earth, a two-episode TV dramatisation, made in 2009
- 1066 (film), a movie in pre-production as of 2017, starring Mark Lester as King Harold Godwinson

== Other uses ==
- International Harvester 1066, a popular tractor model made between 1971 and 1976
