= Farmall eight-cylinder tractors =

Row crop tractor family

Farmall 1468
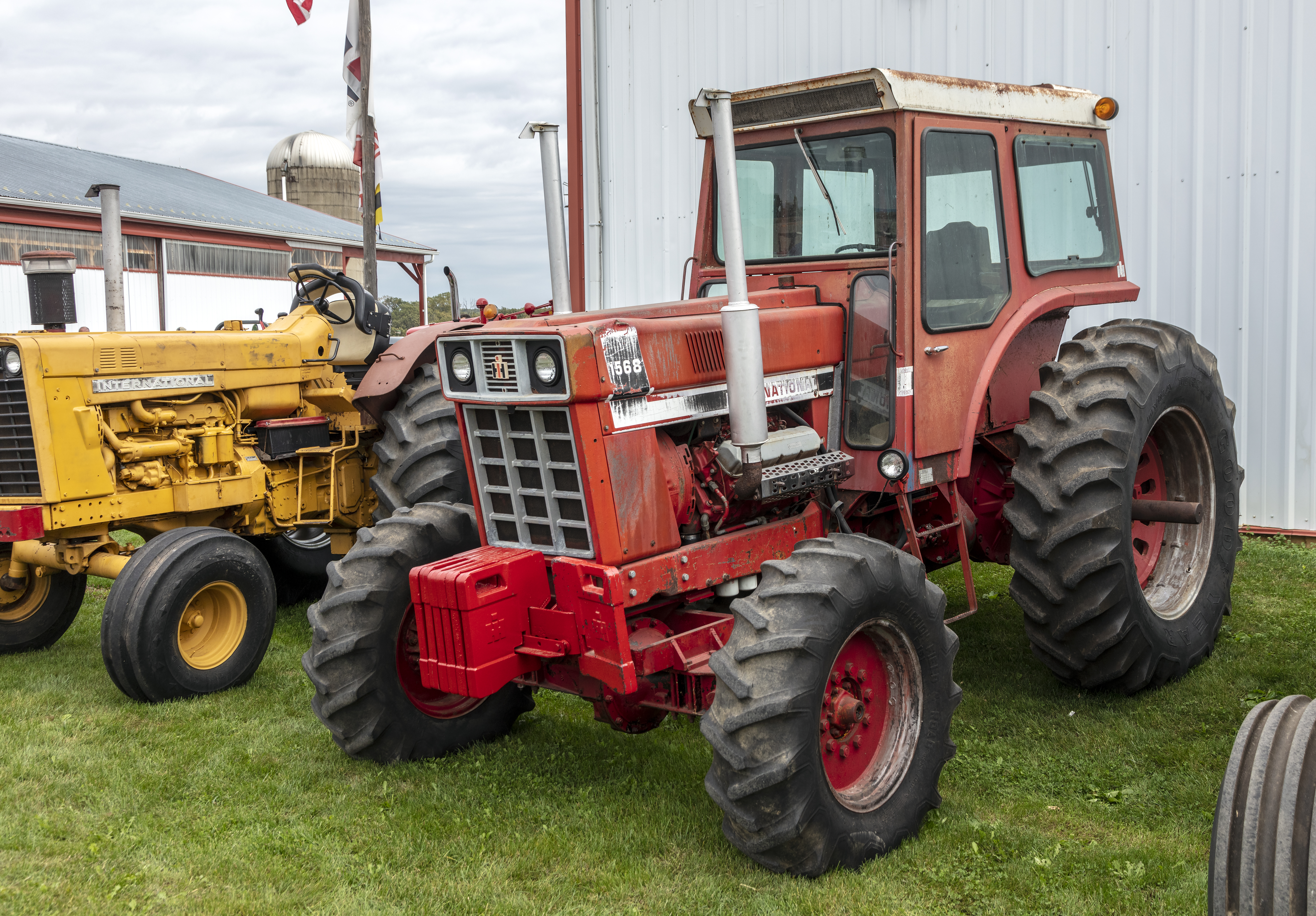
- International Farmall 1568 tractor
- Type: Row-crop agricultural tractor
- Manufacturer: International Harvester
- Production: 1957-1963
- Weight: 11,850 pounds (5,380 kg)
- Propulsion: Rear wheels
- Engine model: International DV550
- Gross power: 161 horsepower (120 kW)
- PTO power: 145 horsepower (108 kW)
- Succeeded by: Farmall 1568

The Farmall eight-cylinder tractor line or Farmall 08 series was briefly produced near the end of the Farmall product run, in response to pressure to increase horsepower and to match competing brands.

== Background ==
The Farmall eight-cylinder tractor line was a culmination of the trend toward row crop tractors with an emphasis on horsepower over torque. Early tractors had low horsepower ratings, but had great "lugging" power. As trends toward higher operating speeds and advanced, power-consuming implements increased, all of International Harvester's product lines received larger and more powerful engines. The Farmall row-crop line began using six-cylinder engines in the early 1960s in most models, and introduced turbocharged engines in higher lines. The introduction of hydrostatic transmissions in place of geared transmissions increased the demand for power. In the late 1960s Massey Ferguson began selling V-8 tractors. As a result, V-8 engines were introduced into the Farmall line.

== Farmall 1468 ==
The Farmall 1468 was produced beginning in 1971. It was essentially a Farmall 1466 with an International 549-cubic-inch (9,000 cc) diesel V-8 truck engine. Compared to the 1466, it was no more powerful, but made a distinctive noise and had two prominent exhaust stacks flanking the engine housing. Since the engine was designed for trucks, it could not be used as a structural element, which was standard practice for tractor engines and transmissions, and had to be mounted in a frame. The protruding exhausts and manifolds of the V-8 posed a burn hazard and had to be protected with decorative shields. To save fuel, the injector sent fuel to only four cylinders when the engine was under a light load. About 2,500 1468s were produced, selling for about $18,000.

== Farmall 1568 ==
The 1468 was replaced in 1975 by the 1568, with an updated powertrain. By this time the Farmall name was being phased out, and a few of the mostly International 1568s were sold as Farmall 1568s. About 1,000 1568s were produced, selling for about $23,000.

== Comparable products ==
The 1468D was comparable to the Massey Ferguson MF-1155D, the Minneapolis-Moline G-1355D, and the Oliver 2255D. The 1568 compared to the Allis-Chalmers 7040DT and 7060DTI.
