= Farmall 06 series tractors =

Row-crop tractors

Farmall 806
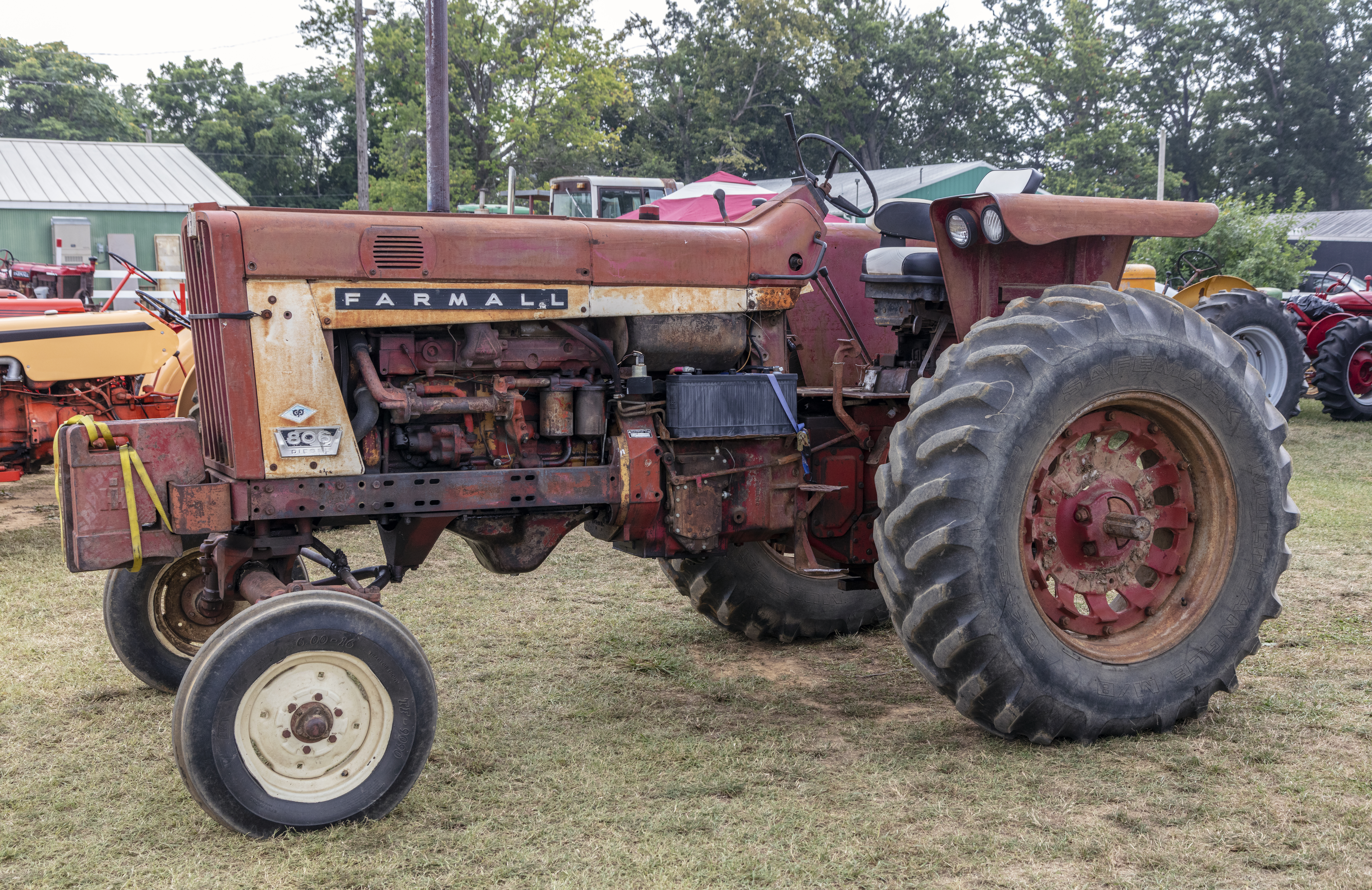
- Farmall 806 with wide front axle
- Type: Row-crop agricultural tractor
- Manufacturer: International Harvester
- Production: 1963-1967
- Length: 161 inches (410 cm)
- Width: 110 inches (280 cm)
- Height: 81 inches (210 cm) (to steering wheel)
- Weight: 7,720 pounds (3,500 kg) gasoline (shipping), 8,500 pounds (3,900 kg) diesel (shipping), 11,895 pounds (5,395 kg) ballasted
- Propulsion: Rear wheels
- Engine model: International Harvester C301 (gasoline), D361 (diesel)
- Gross power: 95 horsepower (71 kW) (gasoline), 110 horsepower (82 kW) (diesel)_
- PTO power: 63.85 horsepower (47.61 kW)
- Drawbar power: 53.23 horsepower (39.69 kW)
- Drawbar pull: 9,182 pounds (4,165 kg)
- NTTL test: 909

The Farmall 06 series tractors are a family of row-crop tractors with six-cylinder engines, providing greater horsepower than the parallel product line of four-cylinder Farmall 04 series tractors. Until the late 1950s, Farmall and parent company International Harvester tractors used four-cylinder engines for general-purpose and row-crop tractors. Demands for higher performance and greater horsepower led to broader use of six-cylinder engines, with the bulk of International's production moving to the larger engines. The Farmall 806 and 706 were introduced in 1963, with production running to 1967. The Farmall 1206 was introduced in 1965 as the most powerful tractor of its time, using a turbocharged diesel engine. Production of the 1206 also ran until 1967. The 06 series sold well and was regarded as extremely successful.

As part of International's product development and marketing cycle, new models were usually introduced every three years, either as new developments, or as rebadged and minimally updated versions of the previous series. The 56 series was an update of the 06 series, and included the new Farmall 656. 56-series tractors could be equipped with roll-over protection with integrated sunshades A hydrostatic transmission was introduced for the first time in IH/Farmall products, with the 656. More updates followed in the 66 series, which was itself followed, counter-intuitively, by the 26 series.

== Development ==
Through the 1940s and 1950s, tractor horsepower had increased from around 30 horsepower (22 kW) to between 40 horsepower (30 kW) to 50 horsepower (37 kW). In 1960, John Deere introduced a general crop tractor with a six-cylinder engine. International's response was the Farmall 806 and 706. The new models also featured hydraulic braking, steering and accessory systems, using three separate pumps. The evolution to higher power continued with the 56 series, a direct outgrowth of the 06 series, and continued in the 66 and 26 series...

== Farmall 806 ==
Introduced in 1963, the Farmall 806 was equipped with a C301 six-cylinder in-line engine of 301 cubic inches (4,930 cc), producing 95 horsepower (71 kW) in gasoline form. Diesel and LP gas versions were offered as well, the D361 diesel with 361-cubic-inch (5,920 cc) and 110 horsepower (82 kW). The transmission was a two-range unit with low and high ranges for a total of eight gears forward and two in reverse. A torque amplifier was offered as an option. Hydrostatic power steering was provided. Two power take-off (PTO) shafts were provided, turning at 540 and 1000 RPM. Both narrow and wide front axles were offered, with an option for a powered wide front axle. The 806 was produced from 1963 to 1976. About 35,000 806s were produced, ranging in price from about $7,100 for gasoline engines, to about $7,900 for diesel engines.

High-crop versions of the 806 were produced as the 806 "HiClear" line, and factory cab installations were added in 1965 as an option. The IH 806 was the International Harvester version with a wide front axle.

=== Farmall 856 ===
The Farmall 856 was introduced in 1967 as a rebadged 806. Larger engines were used, with a non-turbocharged diesel engine that produced 110 horsepower (82 kW). Most 856s were produced with diesel engines. The Farmall 856 Custom was the slightly downgraded economy model.

=== Farmall 826 ===
The Farmall 826 followed the 856 in 1969 with a 102-horsepower (76 kW) gasoline engine, with options for LP and diesel. Similar to its predecessor, the 826 was offered with conventional gear drive and hydrostatic drive. The hydrostatic transmission cost about 20 horsepower (15 kW), but provided greater flexibility and ease of operation. About 15,000 826s were produced, at a purchase price of about $9,500 to $10,500.

=== Farmall 966 ===
The Farmall 966 replaced the 826. It was produced only with diesel engines. The International Harvester 966 is the same machine. A Farmall high crop version was produced as well. About 25,000 966s were produced, with prices ranging from $11,600 to $12,700.

=== Farmall 1066 ===
The Farmall 1066 used a turbocharged version of the 966's 414-cubic-inch (6,780 cc) diesel engine. The Farmall 1066 Hi-Clear was intended for high crops. An international Harvester-branded 1066 was offered as well. About 55,000 1066s were produced, selling for between $12,900 to $13,900.

=== Farmall Hydro 100 ===
The Farmall Hydro 100 replaced hydrostatic versions of the 966 and 1066, using a 436-cubic-inch (7,140 cc) engine, with no turbocharger. About 7,000 Hydro 100s were produced, selling for about $7,000.

== Farmall 706 ==
Farmall 706
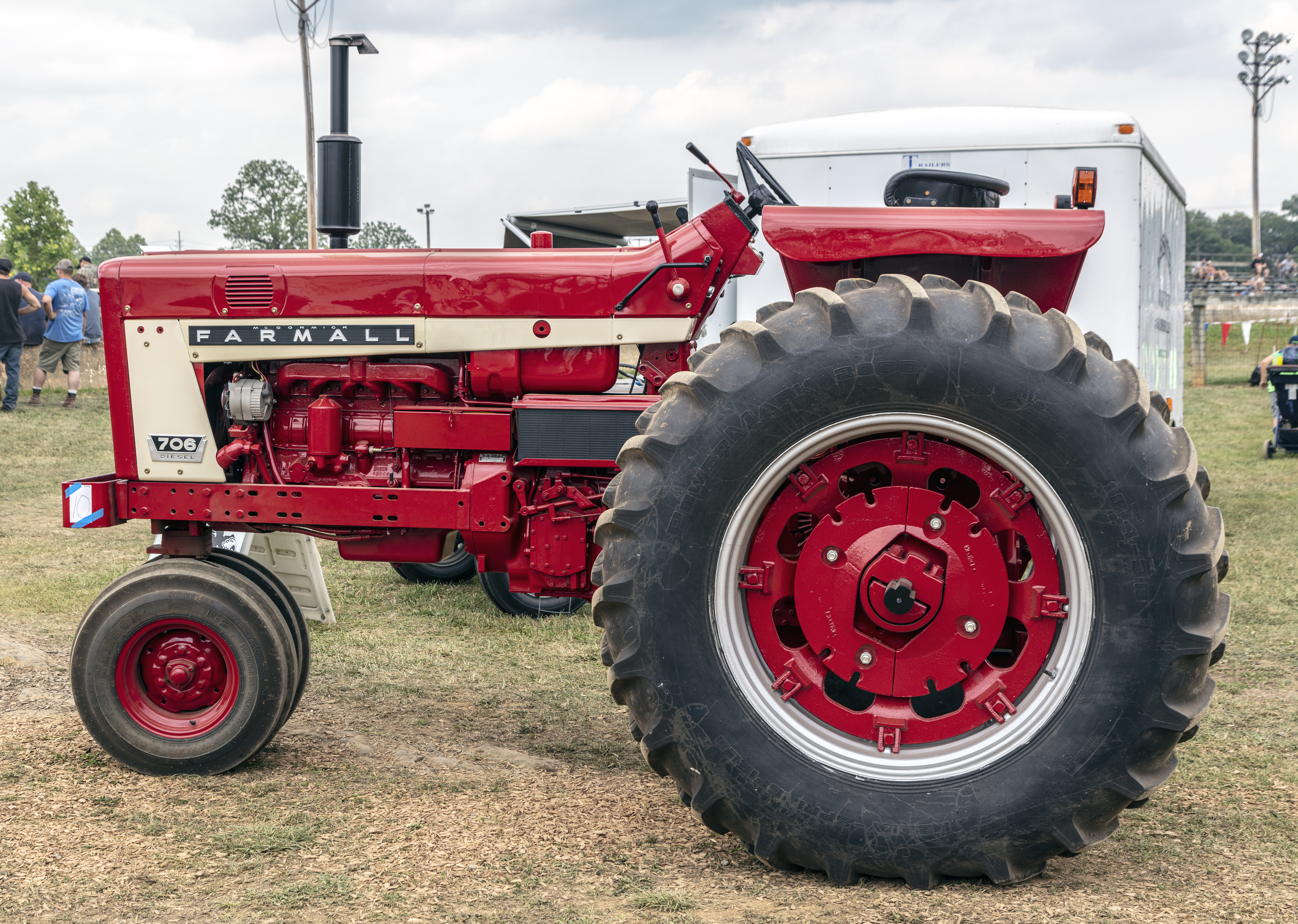
- Farmall 706
- Type: Row-crop agricultural tractor
- Manufacturer: International Harvester
- Production: 1963-1967
- Length: 157 inches (400 cm)
- Width: 92 inches (230 cm)
- Height: 80 inches (200 cm) (to steering wheel)
- Weight: 8,285 pounds (3,758 kg) gasoline, 8,530 pounds (3,870 kg) diesel, 10,710 pounds (4,860 kg) ballasted
- Propulsion: Rear wheels
- Engine model: International Harvester C263 (gasoline), D282 (diesel)
- Gross power: 89 horsepower (66 kW) (gasoline)
- PTO power: 72.42 horsepower (54.00 kW)
- Drawbar power: 65.12 horsepower (48.56 kW)
- Drawbar pull: 8,026 pounds (3,641 kg)
- NTTL test: 856

The Farmall 706 was a slightly smaller version of the 806, and was also first produced in 1963. It used an 89-horsepower (66 kW) C263 six-cylinder in-line engine of 282 cubic inches (4,620 cc), producing 89 horsepower (66 kW) in gasoline form. As with the 806, diesel and LP gas versions were offered, along with cabs, wide and narrow front axle, and a powered wide front axle. The diesel used a D282 engine. The 706 was produced from 1963 to 1967. About 46,000 706s were produced, for a price of about $6,300 for models with gasoline engines, to about $7,100 for diesel versions.

The International IH-706 was the standard-tread version, and the IH-2706 was the industrial version.

=== Farmall 756 ===
The Farmall 756 replaced the 706 in 1967. The tractor was similar to its predecessor, but had an upgraded range of gasoline, LP and diesel engines with greater horsepower. An International 756 was also produced, together with the Farmall 756 Custom, an economy model meant to compete with the John Deere 4000. Production ran to 1969.

=== Farmall 766 ===
The Farmall 766 was a development of the 756, introduced in 1971. As before, engines became more powerful, increasing to 88 horsepower (66 kW) for gasoline and LP, with a diesel option. The frame was reinforced to allow for heavier accessories and tank carriage. 766s were produced from 1971 to 1976. About 11,000 766s were produced, for a price of about $8,800 for gasoline models to about $9,700 for diesels.

== Farmall 1206 ==
Farmall 1206
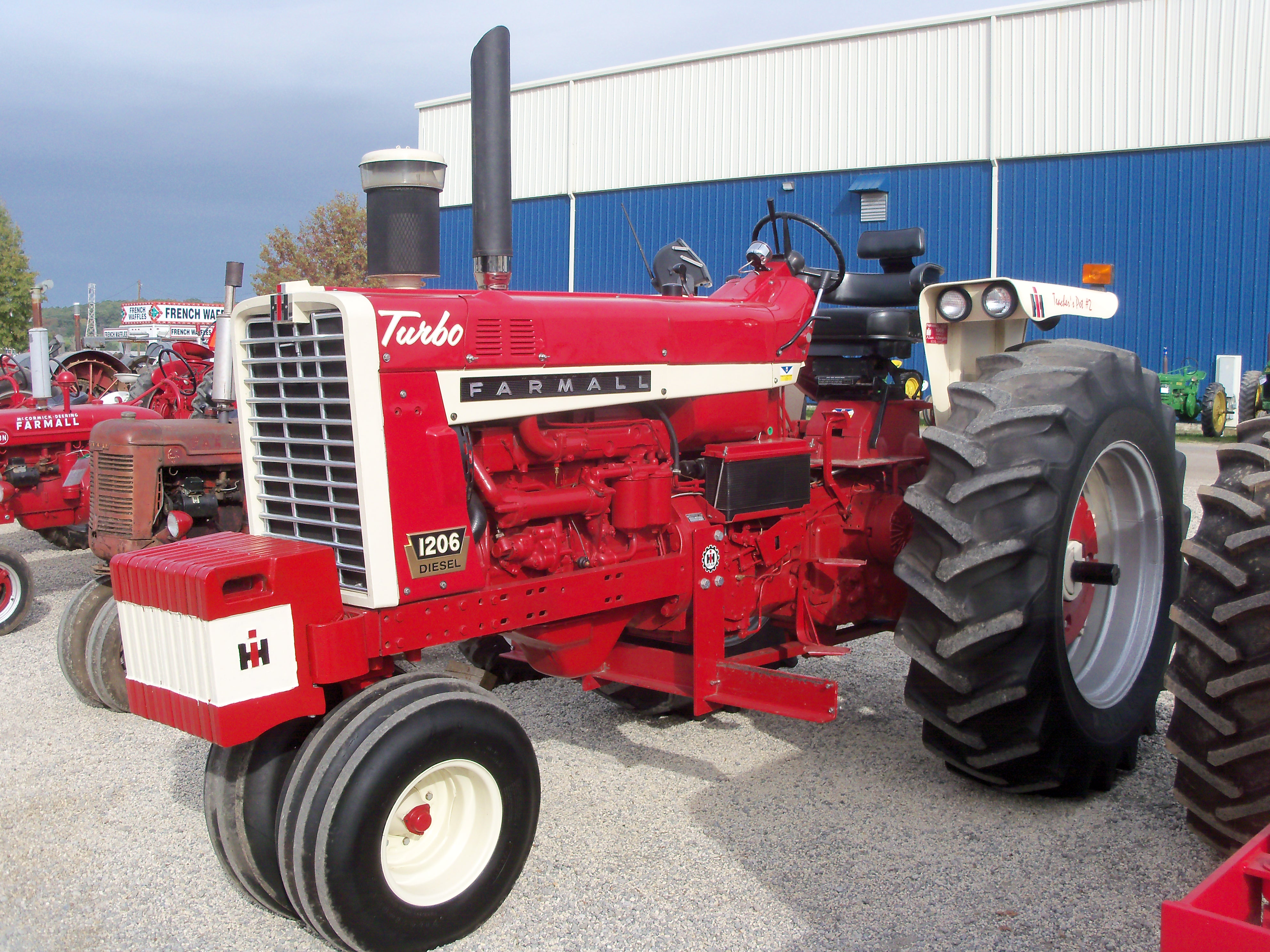
- Farmall 1206
- Type: Row-crop agricultural tractor
- Manufacturer: International Harvester
- Production: 1965-1967
- Weight: 10,115 pounds (4,588 kg) (operating), 13,580 pounds (6,160 kg) (ballasted)
- Propulsion: Rear wheels
- Engine model: International Harvester D361
- Gross power: 110 horsepower (82 kW)
- PTO power: 112.644 horsepower (83.999 kW)
- Drawbar power: 95.00 horsepower (70.84 kW)
- Drawbar pull: 10,744 pounds (4,873 kg)
- NTTL test: 910
- Succeeded by: Farmall 1256

The Farmall 1206 was the first turbocharged Farmall, using the 806's diesel engine, developing 110 horsepower (82 kW). A dual-range four-speed transmission was used for a total of eight gears, increasing to 16 with an optional torque amplifier. The PTO unit turned only at 1000 RPM. Dual rear wheels were standard, and both wide, narrow and powered front axles were available, as was a factory cab. The Farmall 1206 had narrow front wheels for row-crop work, while the International 1206 had a wide axle. A more robust IH 1206 Wheatland model was offered with greater drawbar strength. About 12,000 1206s were produced, at a price of about $9,600.

The 1206 was so powerful that early models damaged tires. Special heavy-duty tires were developed by Goodyear and Firestone to address the problem. 1206s were produced from 1965 to 1967.

=== Farmall 1256 ===
The 1206 was rebadged as the 1256 in 1967, with a larger engine. The new engine was a 125 horsepower (93 kW) 407-cubic-inch (6,670 cc) turbo diesel. Production ran from 1967 to 1969. Only Farmall row-crop tractors were produced, there were no International models.

=== Farmall 1026 ===
The Farmall 1026 was similar to the 1256, but with hydrostatic drive. The International Harvester 1206 Wheatland was produced as well. About 4,000 1026s were produced, selling for about $11,800.

== Farmall 1456 ==
The 1256 was replaced by the entirely new Farmall 1456. The engine was upgraded again, with a 144 horsepower (107 kW) 407 cubic inches (6,670 cc) DT407 engine. The 1456 was produced from 1969 to 1971. As with the 1256, the tractor was produced in a Farmall row-crop model and an International general-use model., About 5,600 1456s were produced, at a price of about $12,300.

=== Farmall 1466 ===
The Farmall 1466 replaced the 1456 in 1971. A yet larger turbocharged diesel engine was offered, the 436 cubic inches (7,140 cc) DT436, with 147 horsepower (110 kW). The frame was reinforced for heavier accessories, and a two-post roll-over protection system was standard, with a four-post system if the tractor was equipped with a cab. About 22,000 1466s were produced, selling at about $14,800.

=== Farmall 1566 ===
The Farmall 1566 replaced the 1466, using a 160 horsepower (120 kW) turbo diesel engine. About 9,000 1566s were produced at a sales price of about $23,000.

== Farmall 656 ==
The proposed International 606 was eventually produced as the International 656 and Farmall 656, replacing the Farmall 460. Its chief innovation was the use of a new hydrostatic transmission. The 656 was produced from 1965 to 1973 with an 66 horsepower (49 kW) C263 263-cubic-inch (4,310 cc) gasoline engine, as well as an LP version. The D282 282-cubic-inch (4,620 cc) diesel engine was also offered. Variants included the International 656 utility tractor, the International 2656 industrial tractor, and the Farmall 656HC high-clearance version.

=== Farmall 666 ===
The Farmall 666 replaced the 656 in 1972, and was offered with either gasoline or diesel engines. About 6,000 666s were produced, selling for between $7,600 and $8,500.

== Comparable products ==
The John Deere 3020 was comparable to the 706. The John Deere 4010 and 4020 were similar to the 806. The John Deere 5020, Massey Ferguson 1130, and Allis-Chalmers D21 were comparable to the 1206.

The 656 was comparable to the Massey Ferguson 180. The 856 corresponded to the Ford 8000. The 1256 matched the Oliver 2050. The 1456 corresponded to the John Deere 4320D.

The 826 was similar to the Case 970 and the Oliver 1855. The 1026 compared to the Oliver 1955D.

The 766 was similar to the Ford 7000, while the 966 was comparable to the Case 970D, and the 1066 matched the Case 1070D. The 1466 was comparable to the Ford 9600DT.

The Massey Ferguson MF-265 and MF-275 were comparable to the 666. The 1566DT was similar to the White 2-155DT.

The Hydro 100D compared to the Ford 8700D.
