= International Harvester 1066 =

Farm tractor

International Harvester Farmall 1066
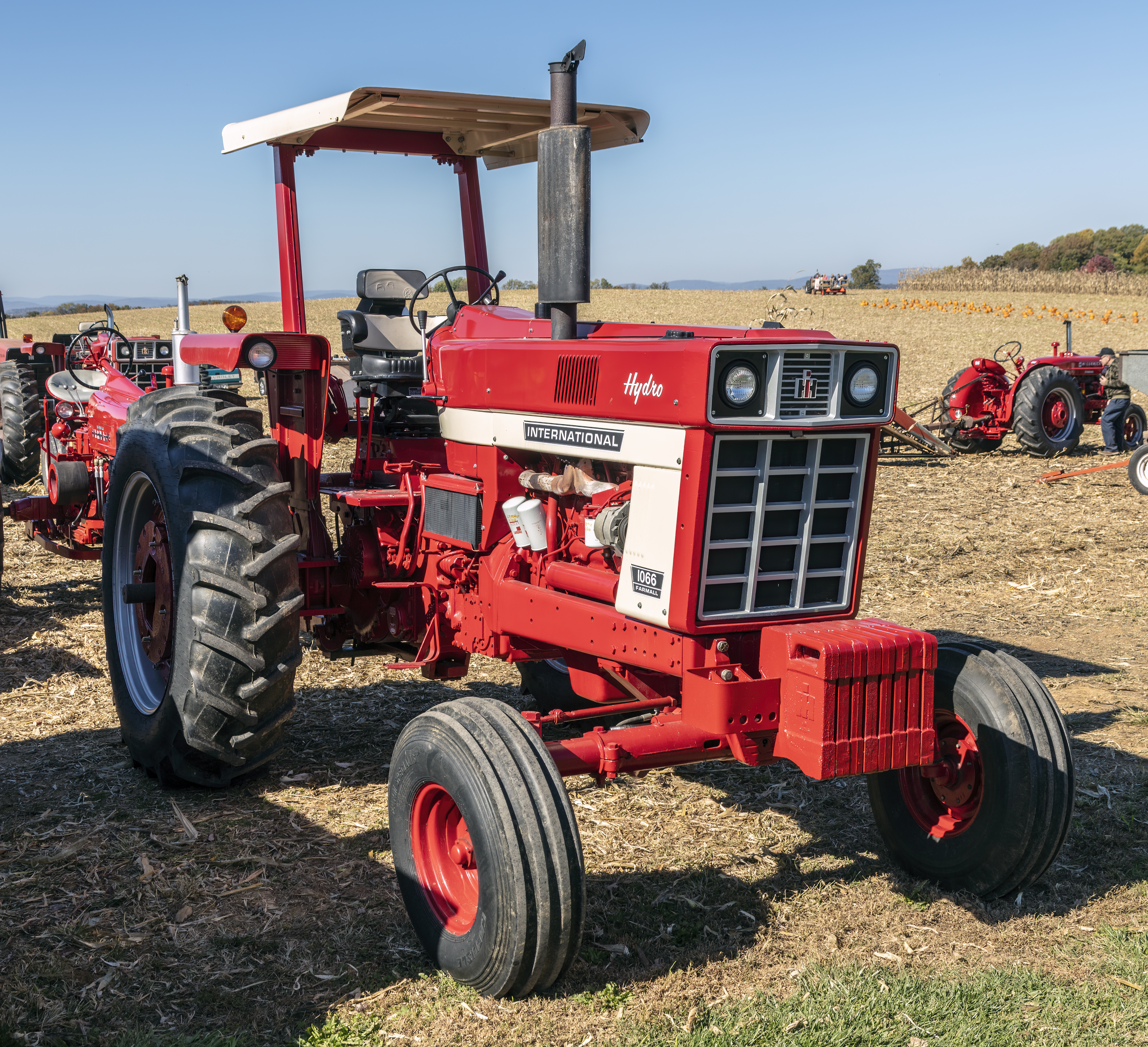
- An IH 1066 Hydro.
- Type: Agricultural, row crop.
- Manufacturer: International Harvester
- Production: 1971 to 1976
- Weight: 12,148–15,260 pounds (5,510–6,922 kg)
- Propulsion: Rear-wheel, front-wheel, and 4WD layout options.
- Gross power: 105 horsepower (78 kW)
- Preceded by: International Harvester 966
- Succeeded by: International Harvester 1466

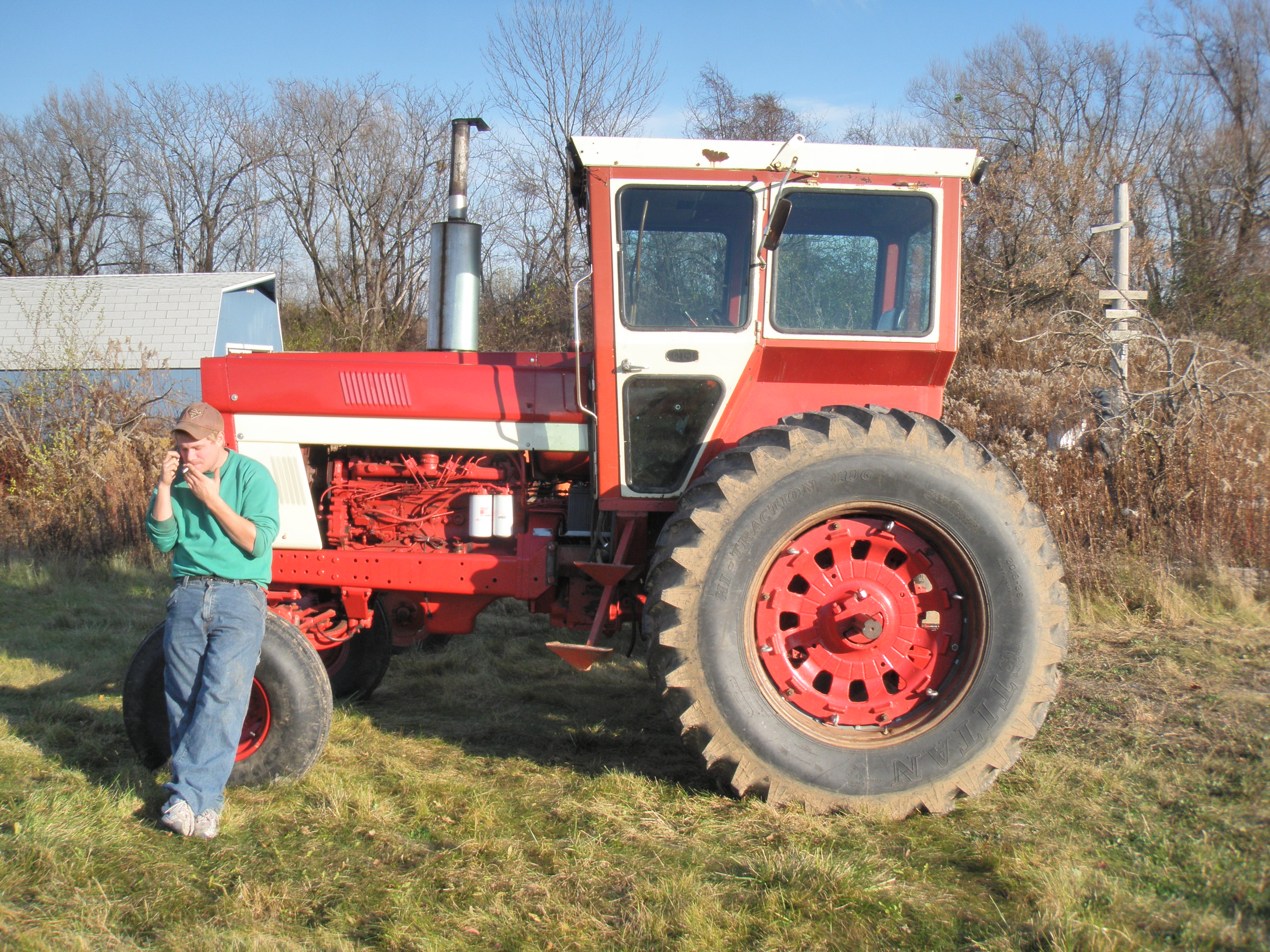
International Harvester 1066 Turbo

The International Harvester Farmall 1066 is a farm tractor that was made by International Harvester from 1971 to 1976. The 1066 has a six-cylinder diesel engine and about 105 drawbar and 125 PTO horsepower. The 1066 is significant for its popularity, with over 50,000 units having been built in its six-year run. There were two variations of the 1066, those being the more standard turbocharged 1066, and the Hydrostatic transmission options, both detailed by their respective hood decals. The hydrostatic version is described to have had greatly less power than the more standard turbo variation 1066.

== Features ==
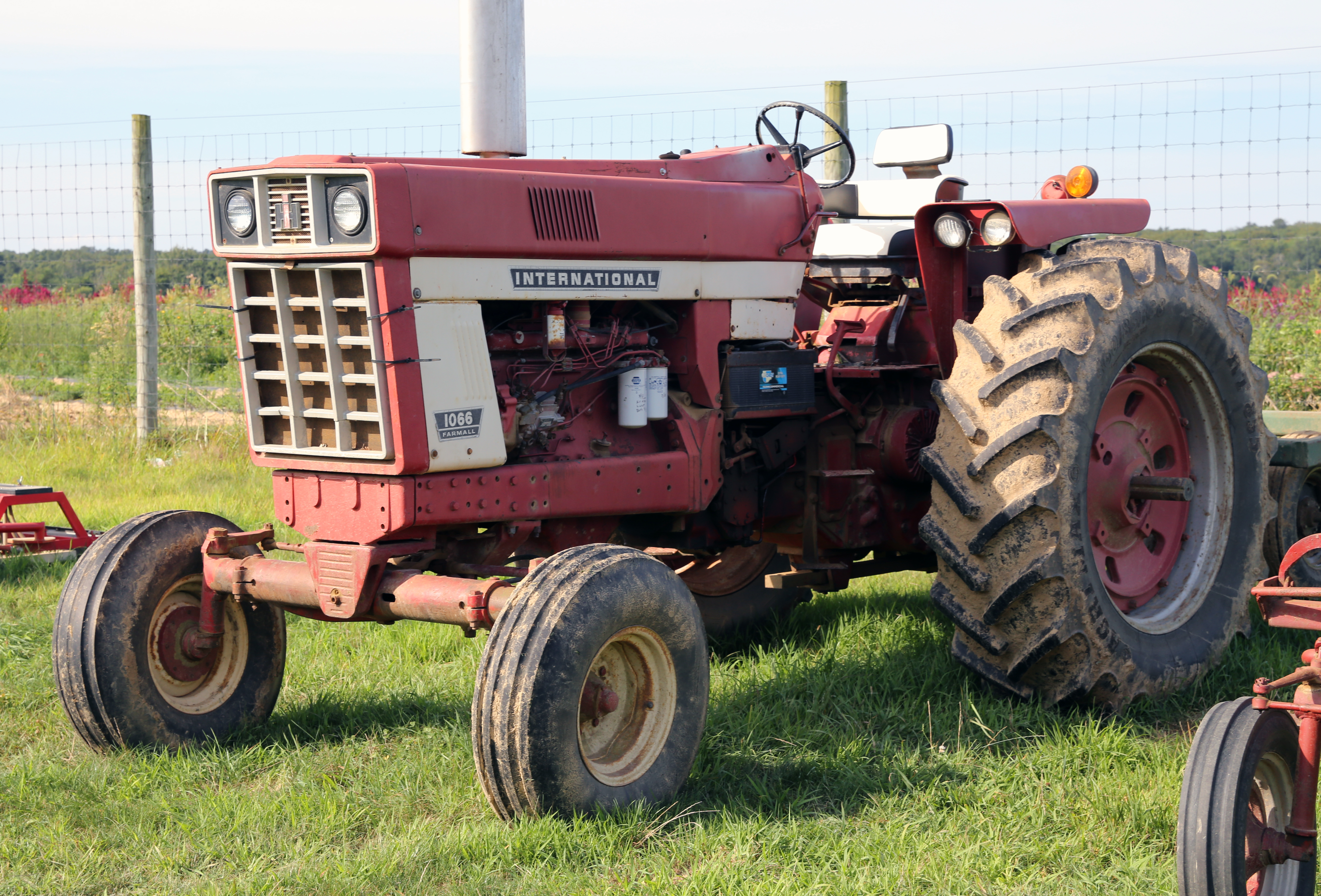
1066 Tractor

- DT-414 engine.
- Turbocharged six-cylinder direct start diesel engine.
- Hydrostatic power steering.
- Dry disc brakes.
- Hydraulic assist clutch
- Dual pto's (540/1000).
- Non synchronized 4 speed transmission with a non-synchronized 2 speed range transmission, 16 total forward speeds when equipped with Torque Amplifier.
- Dual hydraulics.
- Engine HP 105 it has been a myth that some tractors came off the floor with over 150 hp, which was not uncommon. The 414 is sometimes known as a factory hot rod, built and engineered by Jerry Lagod who later formed Hypermax Engineering and set the milestone for the ultimate super stock diesel engine

== Cabs ==
When introduced in 1971, two cabs were available, the "Custom" cab carried over from the previous series and the "Deluxe" cab. Both cabs could be equipped with air conditioning, heat and AM radio.

== Engine ==
The 1066 was equipped with a DT414 direct start, turbocharged diesel engine. The DT414 carried 6.5 Liters of fuel and produced 105 to 108 drawbar horsepower and about 125 PTO horsepower. The engine has six-cylinders.

== Updates ==
In 1975, after the introduction of the 30 series John Deere, IH decided rather than replacing the 66 series, they would give the line a "tune-up" starting with an increase of about five horsepower. IH also altered the "Deluxe" cab. It now had just one window on the doors instead of two, and the rear window could be opened further, and the lower rear window was enlarged. The cab was now painted all red with the roof still being white. In 1973, the "custom" cab was released along with the optional Hydrostatic transmission version.
