= Oliver 60 =

Row crop tractor

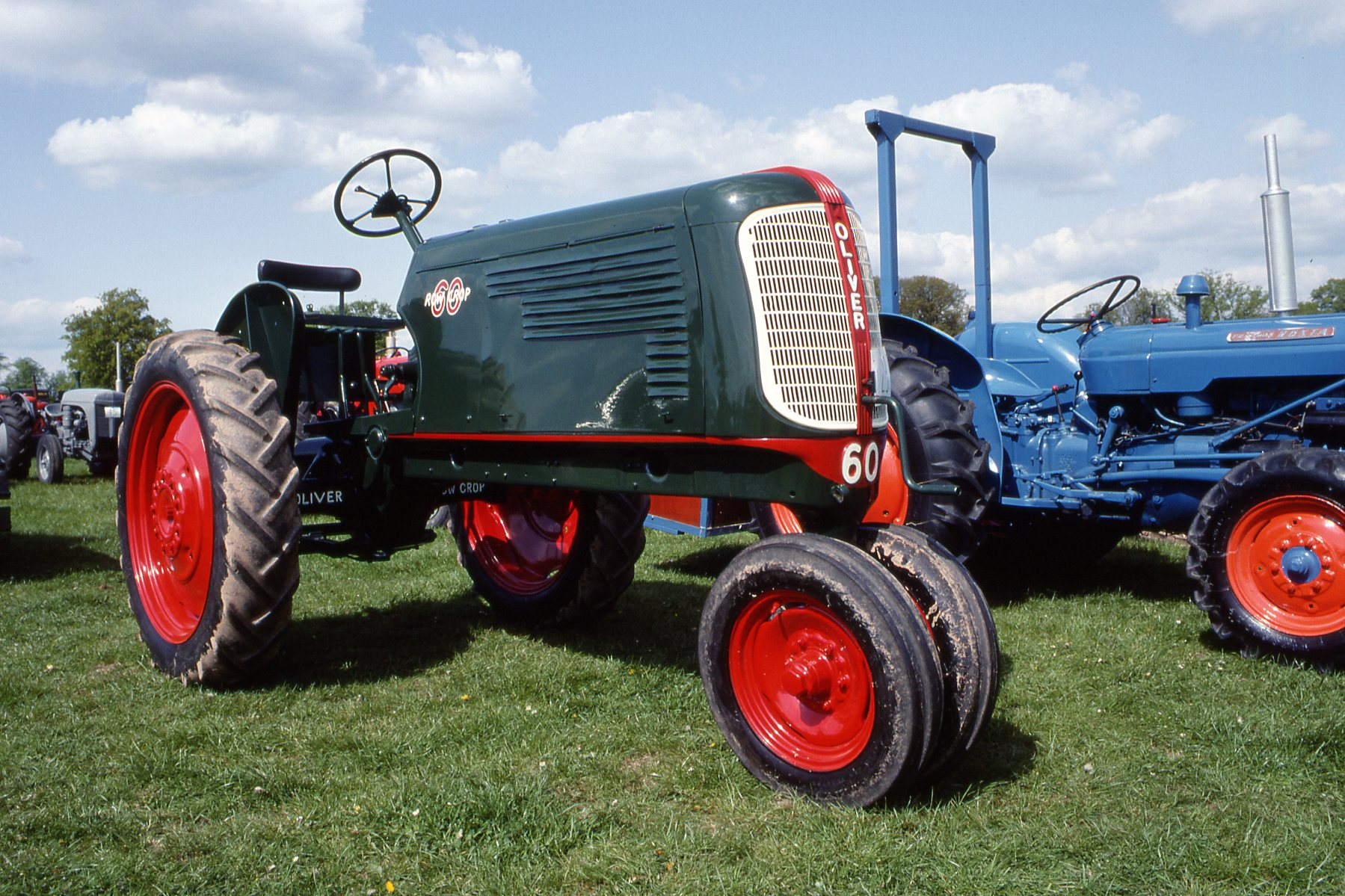
- Oliver 60
- Type: Row-crop agricultural tractor
- Manufacturer: Oliver Farm Equipment Company
- Production: 1940-1964
- Weight: 2,500 pounds (1,100 kg) (operating) 4,000 pounds (1,800 kg) (ballasted)
- Propulsion: Rear wheels
- Engine model: Oliver 2.0L
- Gross power: 20 horsepower (15 kW)
- PTO power: 18.76 horsepower (13.99 kW) (belt)
- Drawbar power: 16.923 horsepower (12.619 kW)
- Drawbar pull: 2,496 pounds (1,132 kg)
- NTTL test: 375 (gasoline)
- Succeeded by: Oliver 66

The Oliver 60 series of row-crop tractors was a product line of agricultural tractors produced from 1940 to 1964 by the Oliver Farm Equipment Company. The 60 series was a four-cylinder follow-on to the six-cylinder Oliver 70. As the 70 was outsold by the less-expensive Farmall A, Allis-Chalmers Model B and John Deere Model B, Oliver introduced the 60 to compete.

The 60 was followed by the Oliver 66, Super 66 and 660, each with incremental changes and upgrades, and was produced until 1964.

== Description ==
The Oliver 60 was introduced in 1940 as a less expensive alternative to the 70. The 60 was equipped with a four-cylinder 120.6-cubic-inch (1,976-cubic-centimetre) engine, developing 20 horsepower (15 kW), with a four-gear transmission. The 60 inherited the 70 Fleetline's styling, with fully enclosed bodywork and a swept-back radiator grille. Versions were produced for row crops with narrow front wheels, standard models with a wide front axle, and an industrial version. Engines could be obtained for gasoline or kerosene/distillate fuels. Production took place in the Oliver plant in Charles City, Iowa, selling for about $1,700 in 1948. The Oliver 60 was sold in Canada as the Cockshutt 60.

== Oliver 66 ==
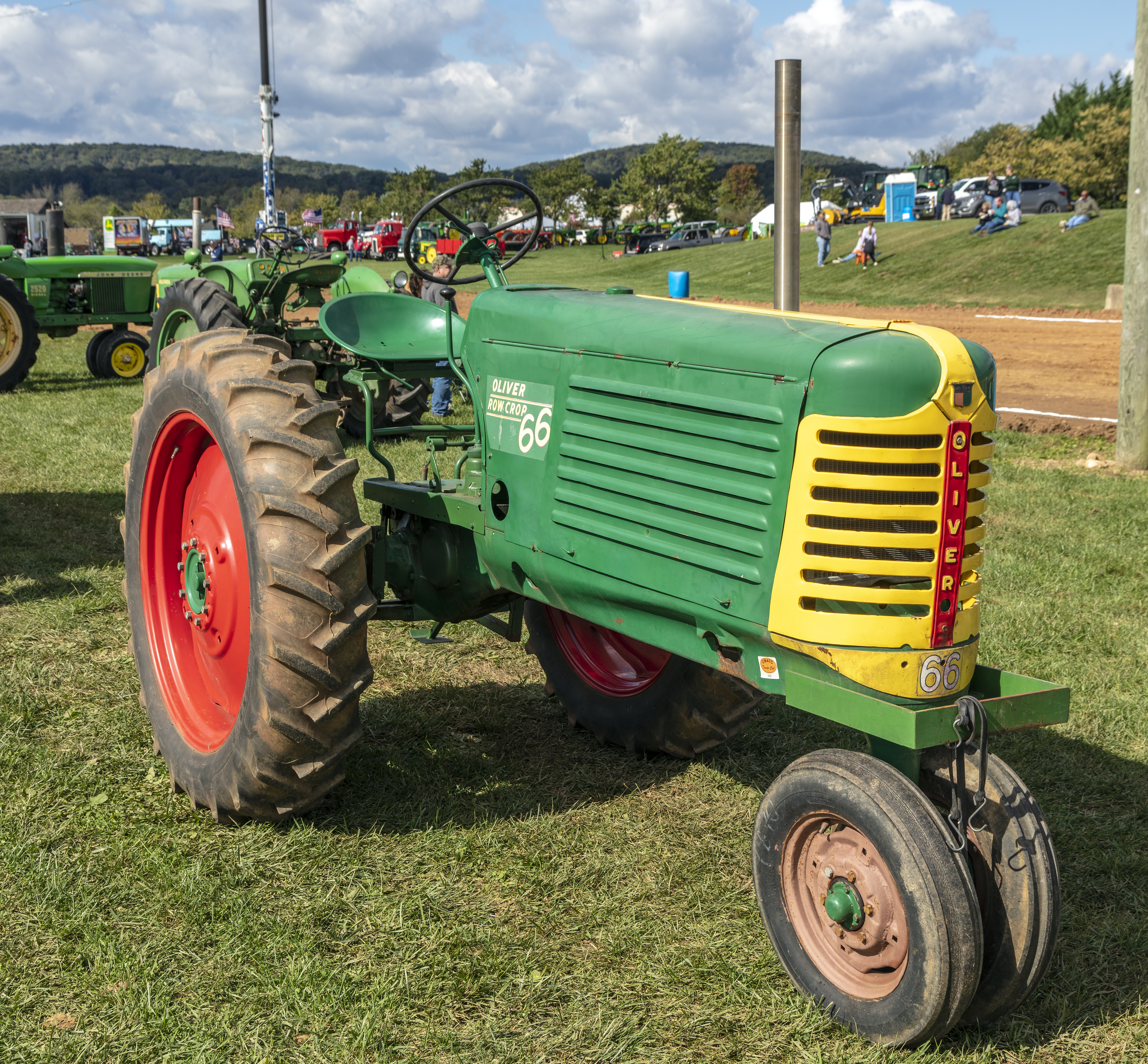
Oliver 66 Row Crop

The 60 was restyled in 1954 as the Oliver 66. Engines came with gasoline, kerosene/distillate, diesel and LP gas options. The 66 introduced an option for hydraulic accessories. Gross power increased to 27 horsepower (20 kW). The 60 sold for about $2,000 in 1954. the oliver 66 was the only fleet line series that was not offered with a factory lp gas option

== Oliver Super 66 ==
The Super 66 was introduced in 1954. The Super 66 used a three-point hitch with hydraulic lift. The Super 66 introduced a diesel version, and a 12-volt electrical system. Power rose to 36 horsepower (27 kW). The engine compartment was no longer fully shrouded with bodywork. The Super 66 sold for about $3,000 in 1958.

== Oliver 660 ==
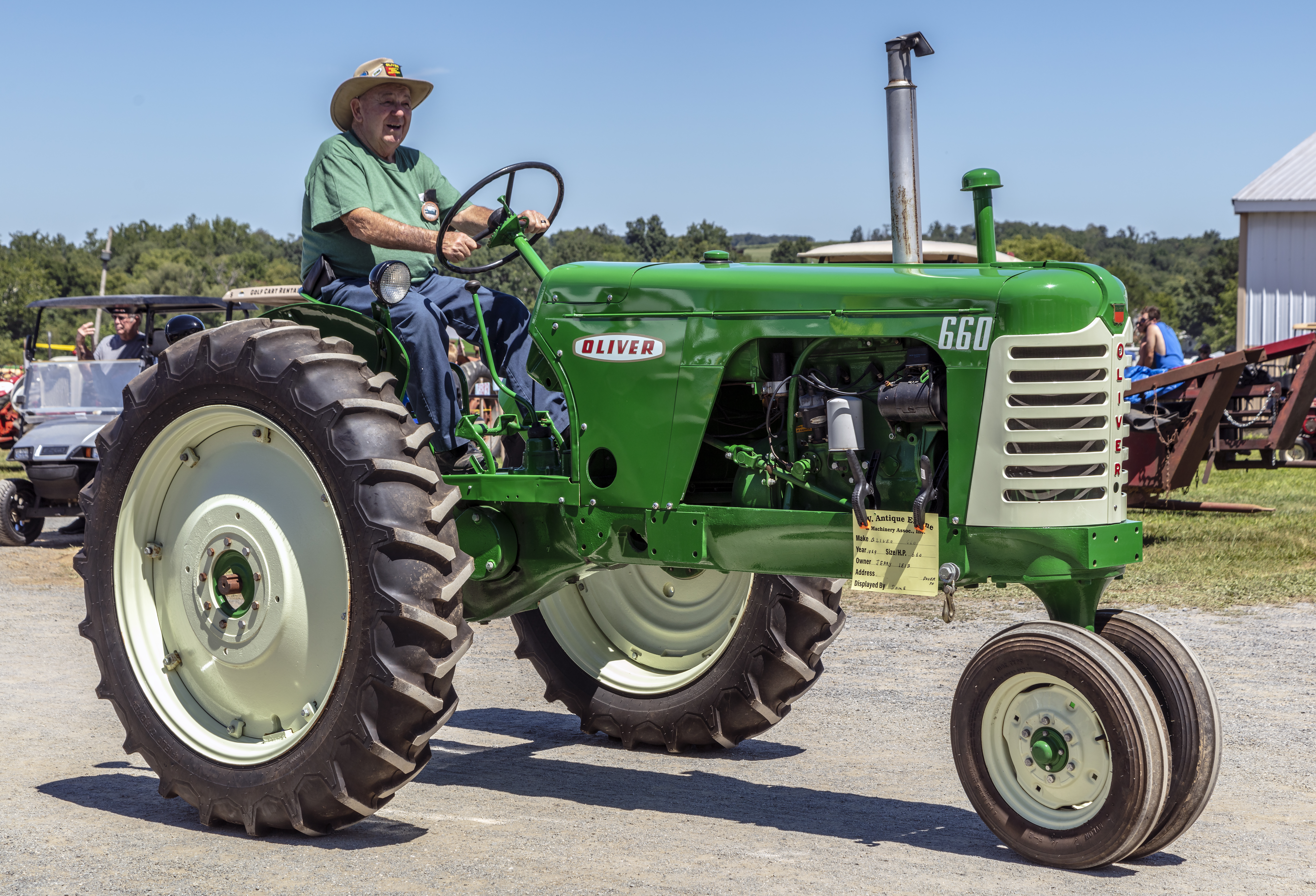
Oliver 660 at a tractor show in Pennsylvania.

A three-number sequence was introduced in 1959 with the Oliver 660. The new line was more squared-off in appearance, retaining the green body and replacing previous models' yellow and red highlights with a green-tinged white for grilles and wheels. The engine increased in power again, to 45 kilowatts (60 hp) gross power. The 660 was produced until 1964, selling that year for about $3,450.
