= Oliver OC-9 =

- Type: bulldozer
- Manufacturer: Oliver Farm Equipment Company
- Production: 1959–1964
- Weight: 9,675 pounds (4,389 kg) unloaded, 13,000 pounds (5,900 kg) with dozer blade
- Propulsion: tracks

The Oliver OC-9 was the first tractor crawler by Oliver Farm Equipment Company to employ the use of a torque converter. Along with the OC-96 variant, this model was introduced in 1959 as the final model in the OC series, marking a significant advancement in the company's technological standards.

The bulldozer originally sold for approximately US$9,200. A valuation guide published in 2001 listed the current value of an OC-9 crawler in excellent condition as US$12,000.

== Powertrain ==
Over its lifetime, the OC-9 had several different models of engines, both gasoline powered and diesel powered. In 1960, the crawler was fitted with a 4-cylinder, 198 cubic inches (3.24 L), 62 hp Hercules diesel engine. The same year, the OC-9 introduced Oliver's Trans-O-Matic power-shift transmission, the case made of cast alloy steel. The hydrostatic transmission allowed for on-the-go changes between high and low ranges and also the ability to have one drive sprocket in forward and the other in reverse, something not possible with clutch type crawlers. The transmission, along with power steering and instant reverse, made the crawler easily maneuverable. While a conventional clutch type bulldozer only allows for the engine's kinetic torque to be transmitted to the ground, a converter type set up allows the engine to build static torque and transfer more power to the ground.

== Blade and other attachments ==
The OC-9 was fitted with a three-meter blade. Its design allowed for angling, a crucial design factor used in grading roads. Other attachments included a log winch or 3-Tyne multi-shank ripper. The OC-96 was fitted with a 1.1 cubic yards (0.84 m^{3}) bucket.

== Variants ==
Over the years the OC-9 was in production, there were only slight modifications and improvements made to the design. The most notable were the blade push trunnions and hydraulic ram mounting positions. The only real variant of the OC-9 was a track loader designated the OC-96, built on the same design as the OC-9. The OC-96 was modified slightly to allow for the loader configuration: the final drives were rotated slightly to allow the position of the tracks to be farther in front of the machine. The track frames were lighter duty, and some changes to the chassis allowed the loader arms to be fitted.
