= Nichols and Shepard =

American farm machinery company 1848–1929

Advertisement for Nichols and Shepard traction engine

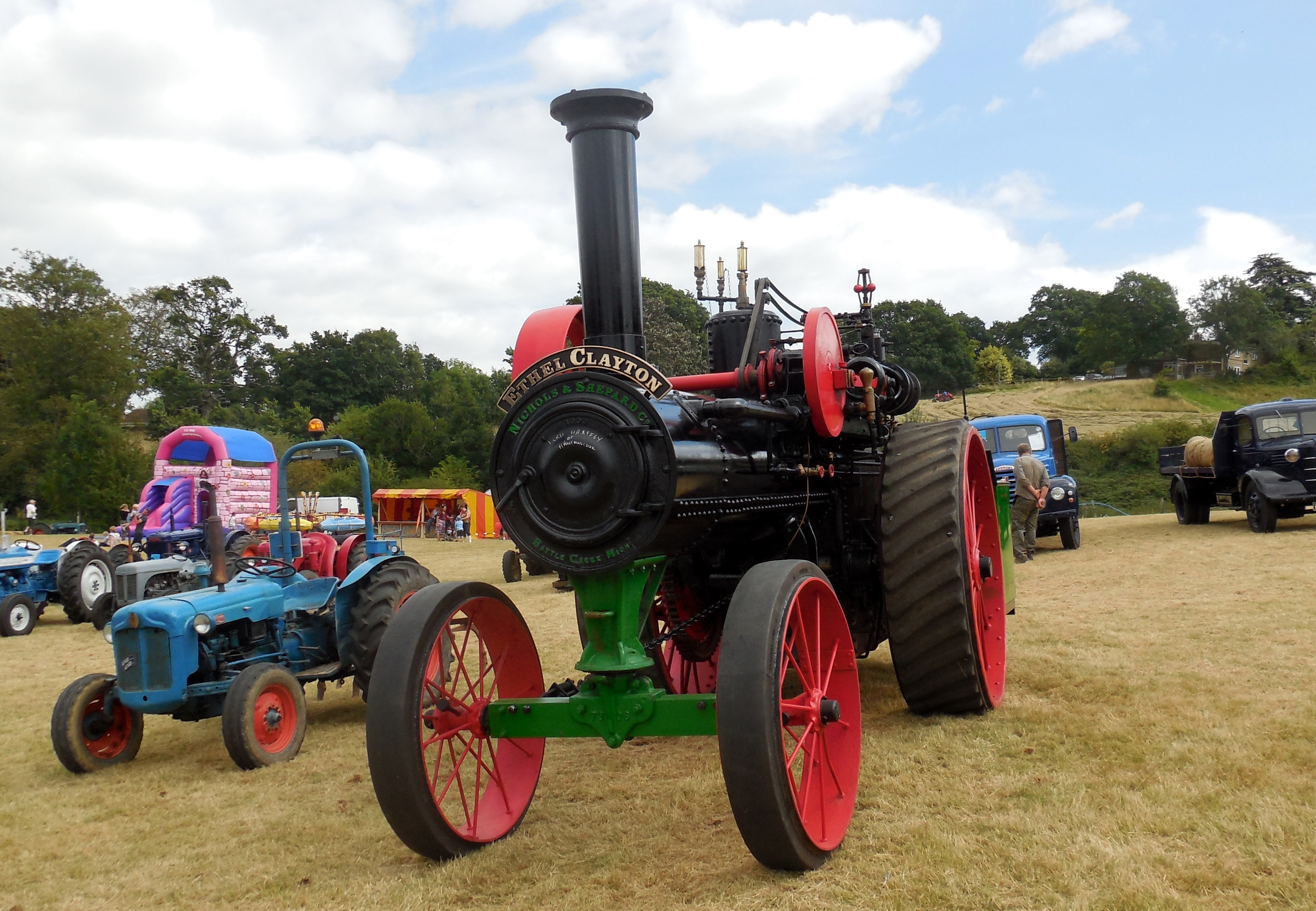
Nichols & Shepard Co traction engine, "Ethel Clayton" at Rural Pastimes, Sedlescombe, East Sussex

Nichols and Shepard Co. was an American partnership company which manufactured farm machinery, steam engines and mill machinery.

In 1848, John Nichols opened a blacksmith shop in Battle Creek, Michigan, where he began making various farm tools for local farmers. He built his first thresher/separator in 1852. The business was successful, so in the 1850s he joined with David Shepard to form a partnership known as Nichols, Shepard and Company which manufactured farm machinery, steam engines and mill machinery.

The first thresher/separator of small grains (largely wheat and oats) was developed in about 1831 by the Pitts brothers—Hiram and John Pitts of Buffalo, New York. However, this early thresher, called the "ground hog," was quite unlike the conventional thresher/separators that developed since that time. For instance, the ground hog's separating unit was largely a slatted apron which pulled the grain across a screen. John Nichols and David Shepard realized that the apron style separator was not a technology that was going to work. Consequently, in 1857, the Nichols and Shepard Company developed the first "vibrator" separating unit for the small grain thresher. This vibrator-style of separator soon became universally adopted by all other thresher/separator manufacturers. The Nichols and Shepard Company received a patent from the United States government for their "Vibrator" grain separator on January 7, 1862. The company also obtained a number of other patents for other advances in the thresher/separator technology, for original improvements in steam engine traction technology. During the 1920s, the Nichols and Shepard Company developed a successfully functioning corn picker.

In 1929 the Nichols and Shepard Company was acquired by the Oliver Farm Equipment Company. Thus the 'corn picker' became the direct ancestor of the Oliver cornpicker.

== See also ==
- Oliver Farm Equipment Company
