= Oliver 90 =

Standard tractor

- Type: Row-crop agricultural tractor
- Manufacturer: Oliver Farm Equipment Company
- Production: 1937-1952
- Weight: 7,000 pounds (3,200 kg)
- Propulsion: Rear wheels
- Engine model: Waukesha-Oliver 7.3L
- Gross power: 43 horsepower (32 kW)
- PTO power: 44 horsepower (33 kW) (belt)
- Drawbar power: 22 horsepower (16 kW)

The Oliver 90 series of row-crop tractors was a series of agricultural tractors produced from 1937 to 1961 by the Oliver Farm Equipment Company. Beginning with the Hart-Parr 28–44, the series was the most powerful Oliver tractor offering, capable of heavy plowing. Initial development proceeded on parallel lines, with the 28–44 offered with low and high-compression engine options that became the Oliver 90 and 99, respectively. The lines merged with the Super 99, then diverged again with the 950, 990 and 995 models. The series was produced until 1961.

== Hart-Parr Model A 28–44 ==
The first heavy Hart-Parr tractor was the 28–44, or Hart-Parr Model A. Following rating by the Nebraska Tractor Test Laboratory, it was marketed with its power rating. It could operate a four or five-bottom plow. Built in Charles City, Iowa, the 28–44 was itself a scaled-up Hart-Parr 18-36, with a 443-cubic-inch (7,260-cubic-centimetre) engine with 48 horsepower (36 kW) gross, and a weight of 6,415 pounds (2,910 kg). At a selling price of $about $1,325, almost 9,000 2844s were sold. A high-compression version was also sold.

Charles City-manufactured 28-44s were sold in Canada by Cockshutt with Cockshutt Hart-Parr branding, starting in 1930.

== Oliver 90 ==
The Oliver 90 was introduced in 1937, updating the 28–44 with a self-starter and the Oliver name. The Waukesha-Oliver engines came with gasoline and kerosene/distillate options. The 90 was offered only as a standard-tread tractor, with wide front wheels. Compared with other Oliver number-series tractors, the 90s were minimally styled. Production of the 90 ran until 1952. A version with a high-compression engine was marketed as the Oliver 99.

As with the 28-44, Iowa-made 90s were sold as Cockshutt 90s in Canada.

== Oliver 99 ==
The mainstream agriculturally-oriented Oliver 99 was introduced in 1952, replacing the 1932 Oliver Hart-Parr 99 Industrial Special High-Compression and the Oliver 90. The 99's production was moved from the main Oliver plant in Charles City, Iowa to South Bend, Indiana. Options were added for six-cylinder and diesel engines, and the tractors received styled sheet metal. The 99 was the heaviest Oliver offering, exceeding an operating weight of 11,000 pounds (5,000 kg). Selling price in 1956 was about $3,500.

The 99 was sold in Canada as the Cockshutt 99.

== Oliver Super 99 ==
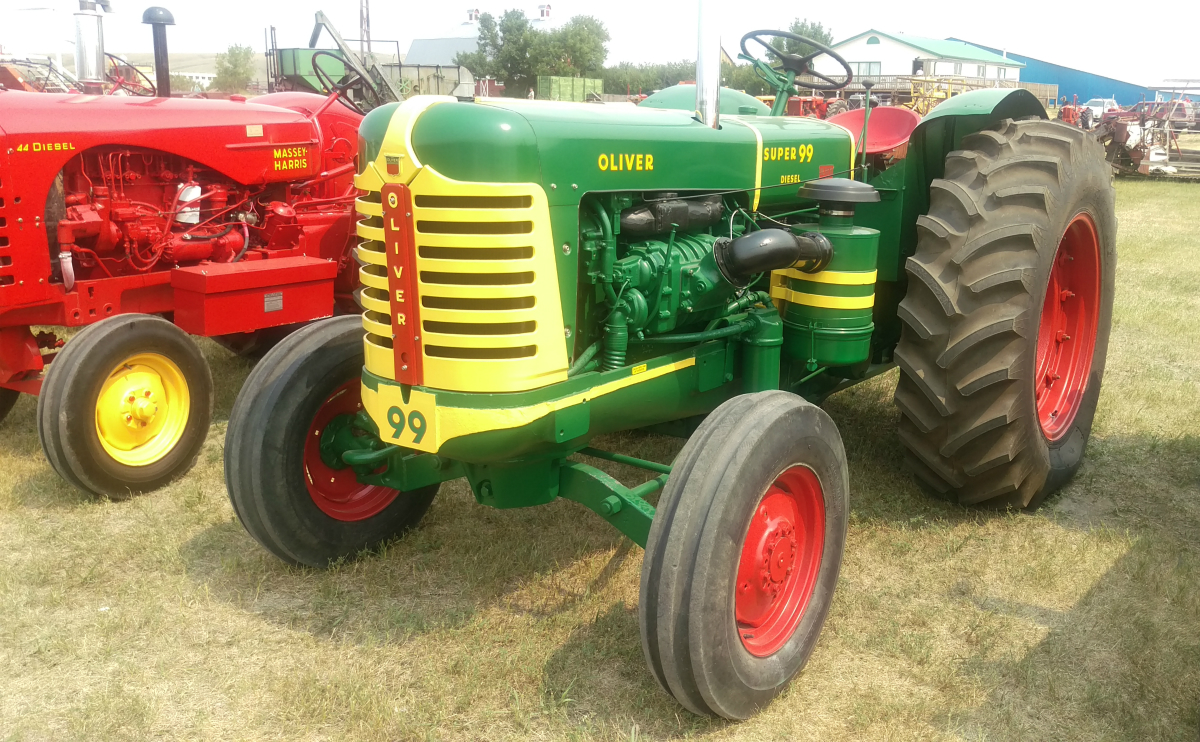
Oliver Super 99

The Oliver Super 99 was introduced in 1955. Engine options included Waukesha-Oliver six-cylinder 302-cubic-inch (4,950-cubic-centimetre) gasoline or diesel engines, or a supercharged 213-cubic-inch (3,490-cubic-centimetre) three-cylinder two-cycle General Motors 3-71 engine. All models had a six-speed transmission. Options included a cab and a torque converter transmission. The Super 99 was the most powerful agricultural tractor of its time, developing an estimated 72 horsepower (54 kW) gross engine power. In 1958 production was transferred back to Charles City. The Super 99's price in 1958 was about $5,000.

== Oliver 950, 990 and 995 ==
Three separate replacements using a three-number sequence was introduced in 1958 for the Super 99. All three were re-styled, more squared-off in appearance, with green bodies and a green-tinged white for grilles and wheels. The Oliver 950 was a re-styled version of the Super 99 with the same systems and six-cylinder power options. The 950 could pull six plows and sold for about $5,900 in 1961. The Oliver 990 replaced the General Motors-engined Super 99, with an upgrade in rated RPM, allowing seven plows with 93 horsepower (69 kW) gross. The 990 sold for about $8,200 in 1961. A version of the 990 was sold as the Massey Ferguson 98, in Massey Ferguson sheet metal. The Oliver 995 Lugmatic added more RPM and a torque converter to the 990 for better performance under load, and was rated for 12 to 14 plows. It sold for about $10,000 in 1961. The 995 was succeeded by the mostly-new Oliver 1900 in 1960, while production of the 950 and 990 ended in 1961.
