= Oliver Farm Equipment Company =

Former American farm equipment manufacturer

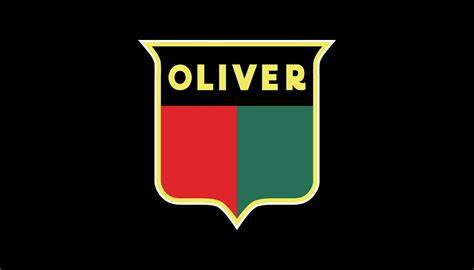
- Predecessor: American Seeding Machine Company, Oliver Chilled Plow Works, Hart-Parr Tractor Company, Nichols and Shepard Company
- Founded: April 1, 1929
- Defunct: February 13, 1976
- Products: Tractors

The Oliver Farm Equipment Company was an American farm equipment manufacturer from the 20th century. It was formed as a result of a 1929 merger of four companies: the American Seeding Machine Company of Richmond, Indiana; Oliver Chilled Plow Works of South Bend, Indiana; Hart-Parr Tractor Company of Charles City, Iowa; and Nichols and Shepard Company of Battle Creek, Michigan.

On November 1, 1960, the White Motor Corporation of Cleveland, Ohio, purchased the Oliver Farm Equipment Company.

The Oliver Farm Equipment Company continued to make tractors until they went out of production in 1976.

== Merger ==
Four companies merged on April 1, 1929, to form the Oliver Farm Equipment Company: The Oliver Chilled Plow Company, dating from 1855; the Hart-Parr Tractor Company from 1897, and the American Seeding Machine Company and Nichols and Shepard Company, both dating from 1848.

By 1929, each of these companies had reached a point where continuing operations independently would not be feasible. For most of them, the market had some time earlier reached a saturation point, and in some instances, their machines were dated and rapidly approaching obsolescence. By uniting their various and somewhat diverse product lines into a single company, Oliver Farm Equipment immediately became a full-line manufacturer.

== Merged companies ==
=== American Seeding Machine Company ===
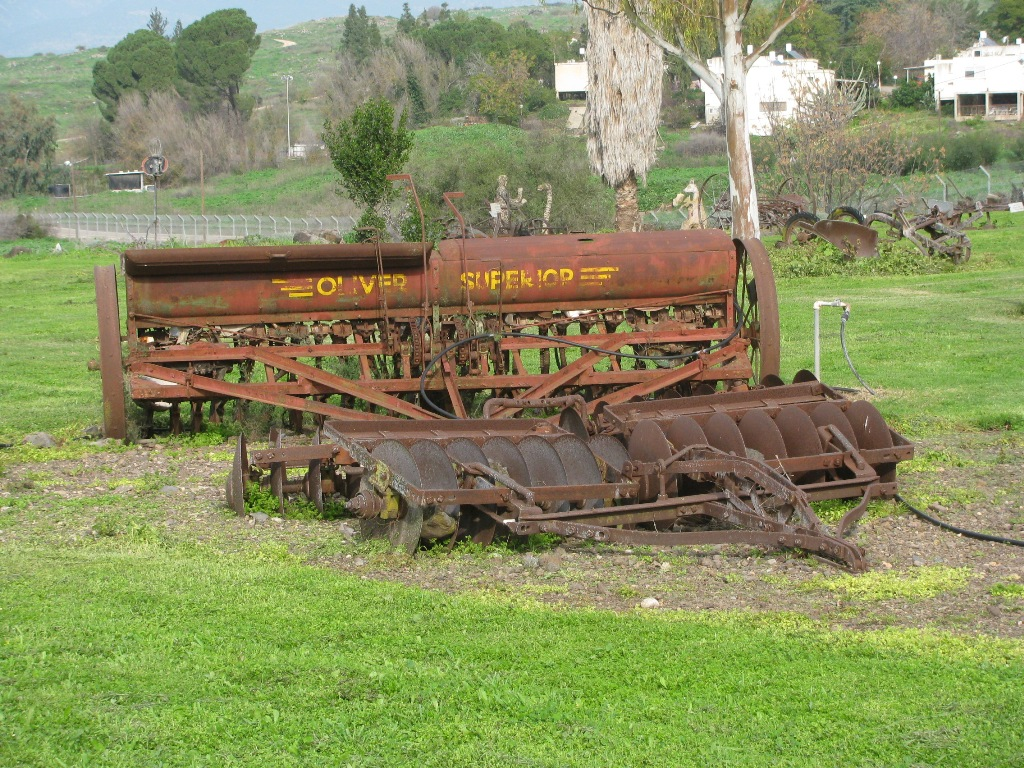
"Oliver Superior" grain and fertilizer drill

The American Seeding Machine Company was organized in 1903 from the a merger of seven different manufacturers of grain drills, corn planters and other "seeding machines." The leading corporate component among the seven merged companies was the Superior Drill Company of Springfield, Ohio. Accordingly, the American Seeding Machine Company established its corporate headquarters at Springfield in the facilities formerly operated by the Superior Drill Company. Other companies which formed the 1903 merger include P. P. Mast and Company (est. 1856), Hoosier Drill Company (est. 1857), the Empire Drill Company, and Bickford & Huffman. The Superior Drill Company name lived on for many years following the merger that created Oliver, in the "Oliver Superior" line of seeding drills and related equipment.

=== Oliver Chilled Plow Works ===
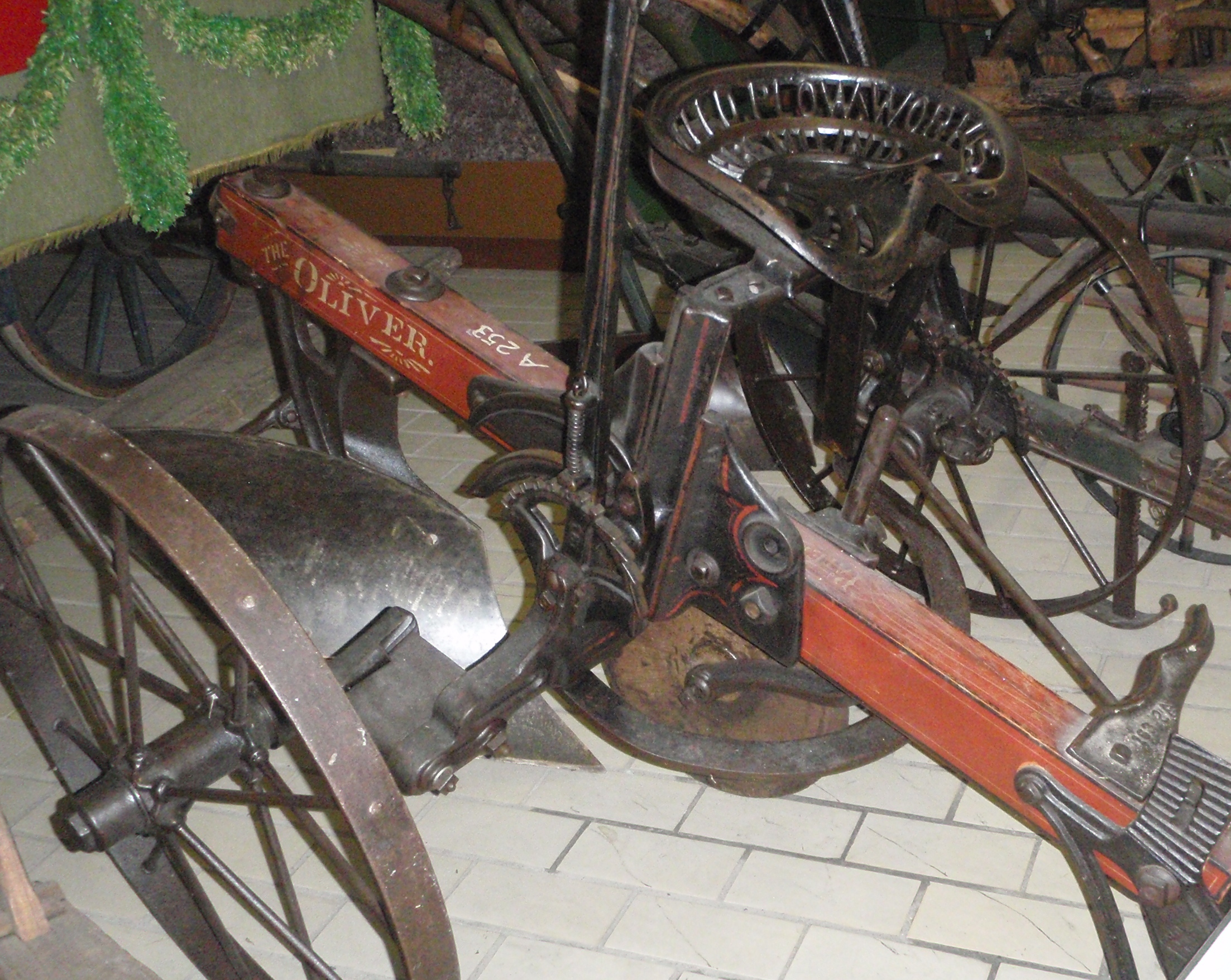
Sulky Plow (ca. 1870) by Oliver Chilled Plow works at the German Agricultural Museum, Hohenheim near Stuttgart

James Oliver started the Oliver Chilled Plow Works in 1853 In Mishawaka, Indiana, where he worked in a foundry. He later bought into an already existing small foundry in South Bend, Indiana. Plows with cast iron bottoms and moldboards had been successfully used by farmers and planters in the eastern states of the United States since the time of Thomas Jefferson. However, in the sticky soils of North Dakota and various other portions of the Midwest, the cast iron plows would not "scour"; that is, the sticky soil would cling to the plow, disrupting the flow of soil over the plow's surface, making plowing impossible. Thus, when settlement of North America moved over the Allegheny Mountains into the Midwest, there was a need for a new plow that would be able to scour in the soils of the Midwest. To allow a cast iron bottom to scour in sticky soil, various methods of heat treating for creating a hardened surface on the metal plow bottom had been attempted. All of these processes failed because the hard surface created was very thin and would soon wear through to the soft iron under the heat-treated surface. James Oliver developed his sand casting process to include rapid chilling of the molten iron near the outside surface of the casting, which resulted in a bottom that had a thick hardened surface with far greater wearability than competing plow bottoms.

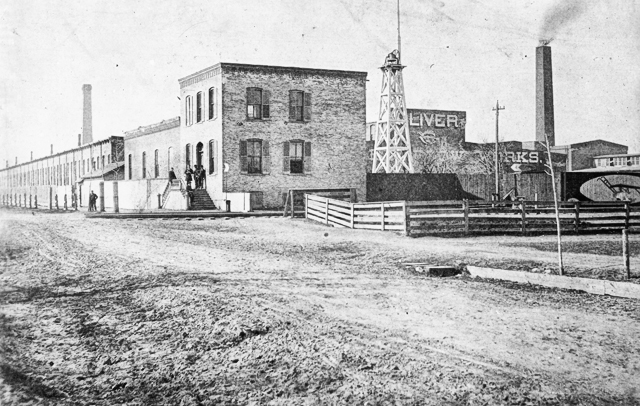
The entrance to the Oliver Chilled Plow Works in South Bend, Indiana, c. 1880.

Another problem common to cast iron plow bottoms was the lack of soundness and uniformity in the metal's molecular structure, which meant that some cast iron bottoms would have soft spots in the hardened surface, reducing the wearability of the plow bottom. Improvements made by James Oliver to his casting process also overcame this problem. Consequently, on June 30, 1857, James Oliver obtained his first patent from the United States government for his chilled plow shares and in February 1869, he obtained another patent for his process. What Oliver accomplished by this invention is sometimes referred to as chill hardening, or simply chilling. The purpose of chilling is to produce an extremely hard and durable exterior of the object. This is done by including "chills", pieces of metal, into the sand mold, such that when the molten iron is poured into the mould, the portion next to the chill cools rapidly, hardening in a way akin to quenching. This chilled area forms the exterior of the plowpoint. This metal cools more quickly than the metal which forms the other portion of the plowshare, and effectively becomes case hardened. Also, the vapors which arise as the molten metal comes in contact with the mould are expelled through a spout. Had these vapors been trapped in the mould, they would have caused impurities and would have weakened the plowpoint at the place where it should have been the hardest. To harden the plowpoints, Oliver arranged his moulding apparatus in such manner that the surface of the chill was in a position so that the melted metal first came into contact with the chill at the edge of the plowshare. This insured a hard plow cutting point.

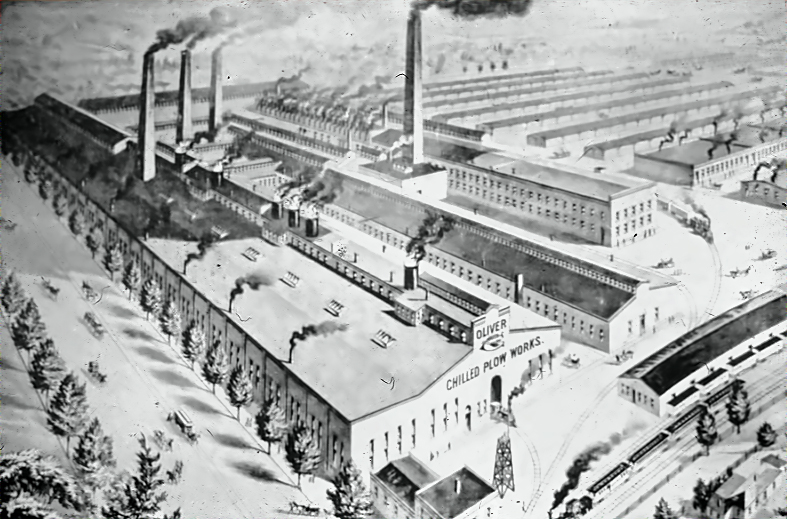
An artist's conception drawing of an aerial view of the Oliver Chilled Plow Works, South Bend, Indiana, c.1900.

Thus, James Oliver's chilled plow bottom became a practical success and on July 22, 1868, the Oliver's business was incorporated as the South Bend Iron Works. In 1871, the company sold 1,500 plows per year. By 1874 this figure had increased to 17,000 plows a year. At the time of death of James Oliver in 1908, the company had again changed names to the Oliver Chilled Plow Works, and their factory site in South Bend, Indiana covered 58 acres (230,000 m^{2}) with 25 of those acres under roof. In January 1885, the plant's mostly Polish workers went on strike in protest of cuts to wages and hours in response to a glut of stock. Veterans of the Civil War with fixed bayonets finally ejected the strikers from the premises. The ownership considered leaving South Bend in the wake of the destruction of parts of the plant, with newspapers stating that they feared "the Socialistic influences operating among the foreign elements at South Bend...probably emanating from Chicago." Many workers employed in plow factories died from grindstone consumption. This is the result of the dust from emery wheels and grindstone in the grinding and polishing rooms. "In South Bend, the 'grinder' is either a Pole or a Belgian; so when he dies, society knows nothing about it." Upon the death of his father in 1908, Joseph D. Oliver, the only son of James and Susan (Doty) Oliver took over the management of the Oliver Chilled Plow Works. By 1910, the company was manufacturing a wide variety of farm tillage implements in addition to the chilled plow. Production had reached the point that, in 1910, the company purchased over 40,000 tons of pig iron alone.

=== Hart-Parr Gasoline Engine Company ===
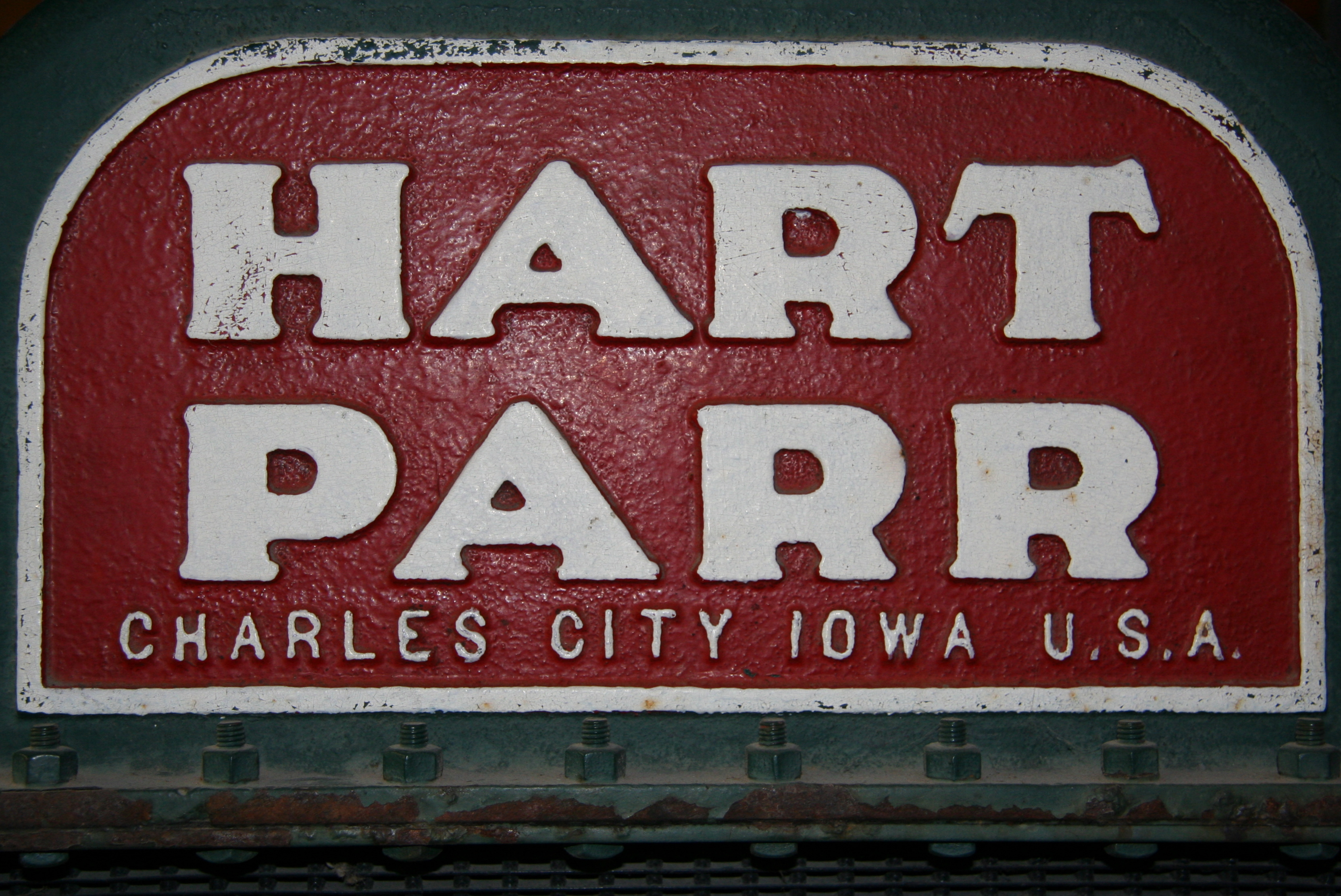
Hart-Parr nameplate

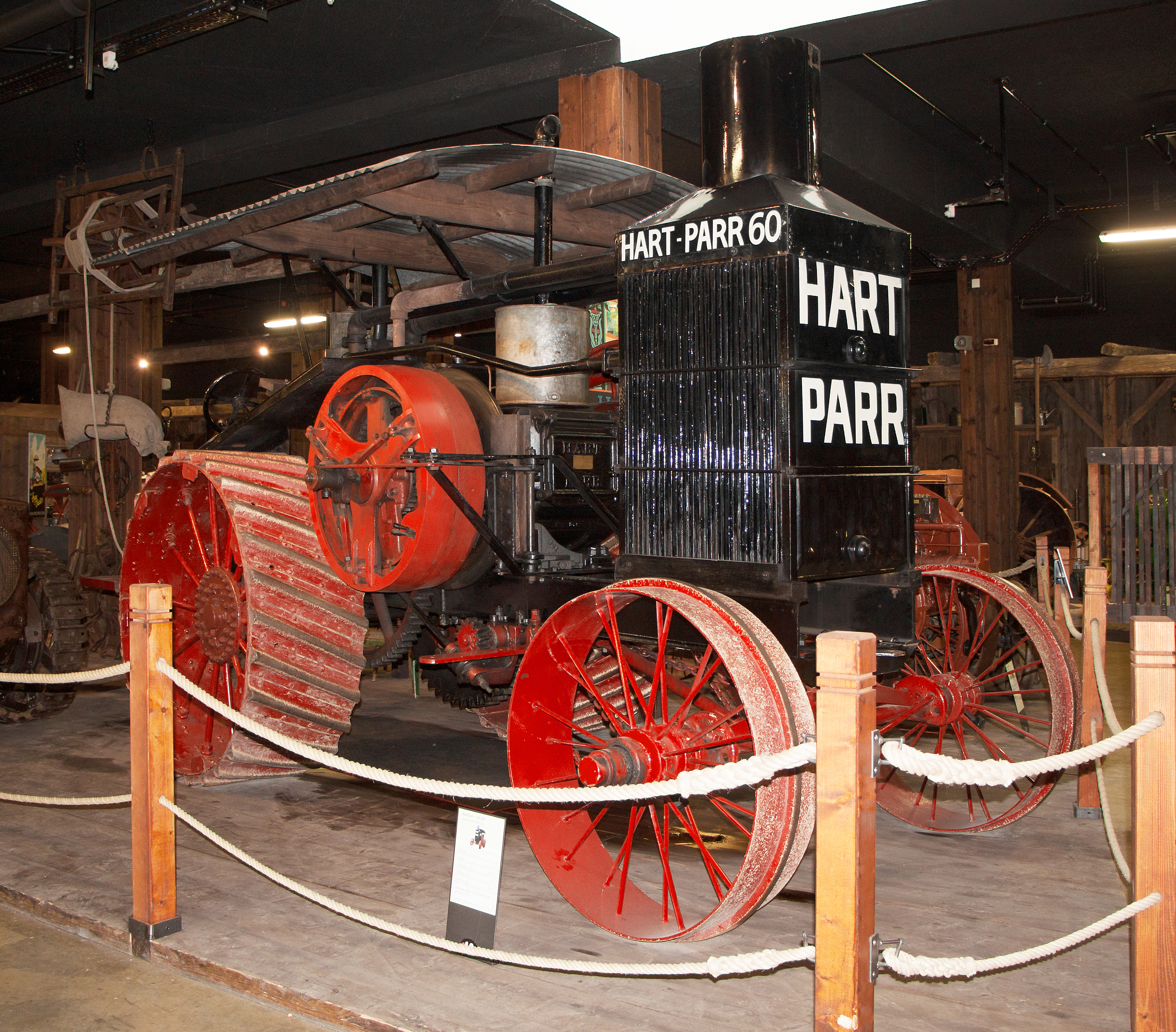
Hart-Parr 30-60 "Old Reliable"

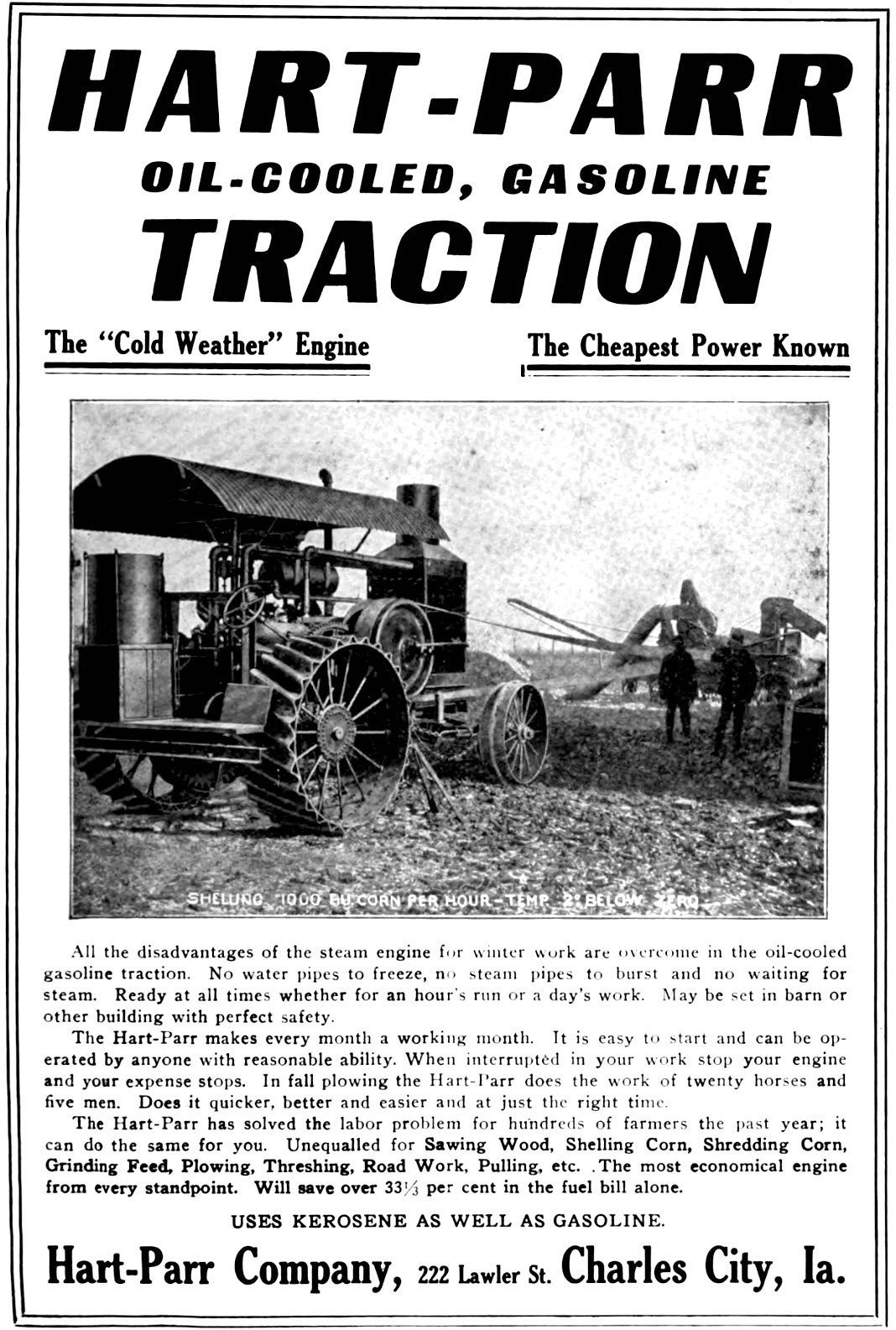
Hart-Parr advertisement (1909)

Charles Walter Hart was born in Charles City, Iowa, in 1872. At the age of twenty, he transferred from Iowa State College of Agriculture and Mechanical Arts, to the University of Wisconsin–Madison. It was here that he met Charles H. Parr, and the two young men quickly became friends. Together they worked on their Special Honours Thesis and from that thesis they built three working internal combustion engines right there on the campus at Madison.

Following their graduation from the University of Wisconsin in 1897, Hart and Parr gathered $3000 in capital and formed the Hart-Parr Gasoline Engine Company. Towards the end of 1899, Charles Hart paid a visit to his parents in Charles City, Iowa. He complained to his father that development funds could not be found for his tractor project. "There's money around here that might be interested," replied the elder Hart, admitting for the first time that his son's ambition was not folly. They then found another investor in Charles D. Ellis, a local attorney, who invested $50,000 in additional capital.

In 1900, as the engine business expanded, Hart and Parr decided to move their company from Madison to Charles City. Hart-Parr Company was organized on June 12, 1901, in Charles City, Iowa. Ground was broken for the new factory on July 5 that year. By the following December, the Hart-Parr Company was now ready to do business and had an authorized capitalization of $100,000.

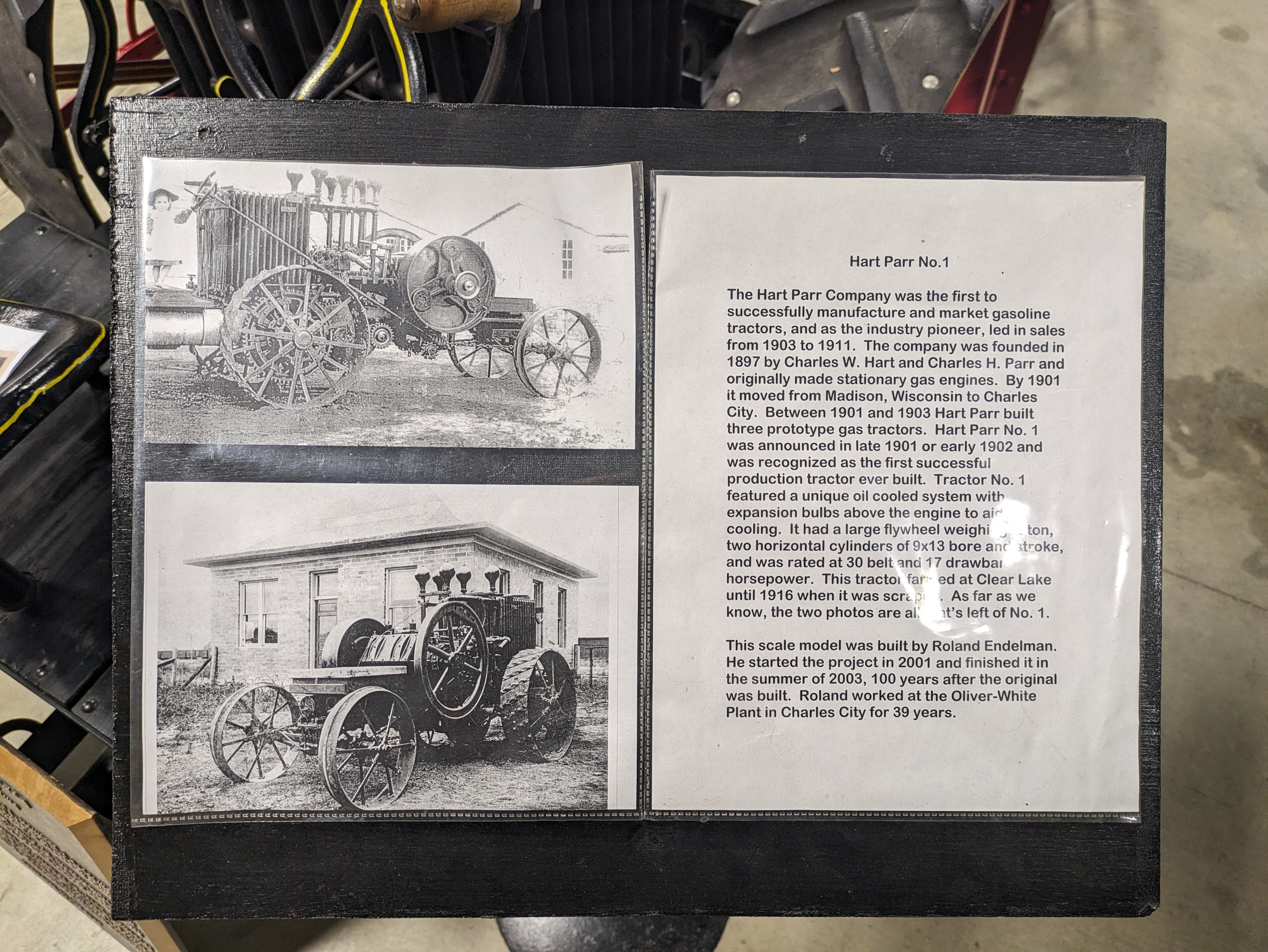
Pictures of Hart-Parr No 1 at the Floyd County Museum.

Hart-Parr No. 1 was completed in 1902 and is recognized as one of the first practical tractors built. However, customers did not immediately beat the proverbial path. However, Hart-Parr was able to field one salesman to run demonstrations at county fairs and other events. Hart was patient. "We can't force it," he said. "We have to let it simmer into the market." Hart-Parr No. 1 featured a unique oil-cooled system that used expansion bulbs on oil-cooling radiators. It used two horizontal cylinders with a bore of 9 inches and a stroke of 13 inches (1,654 cuin / 27.1L). The tractor was rated at 30 belt and 17 draw-bar horsepower. The single example of the Hart-Parr No. 1 operated around Clear Lake until 1916, when it was scrapped.

Hart Parr No. 2 was a prototype machine with only one being built.

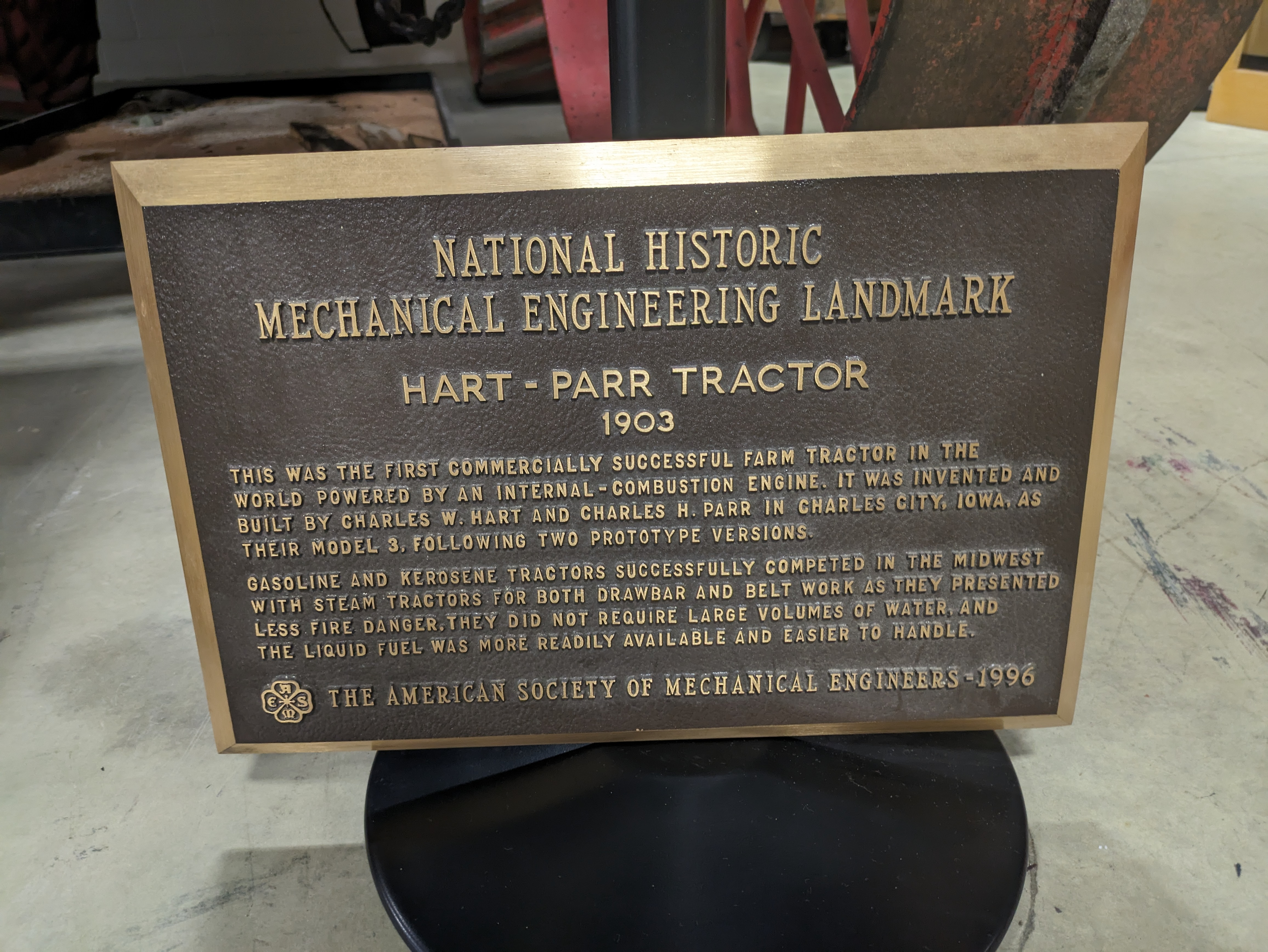
Plaque for the Hart-Parr model 3 from the American Society of Mechanical Engineers (ASME).

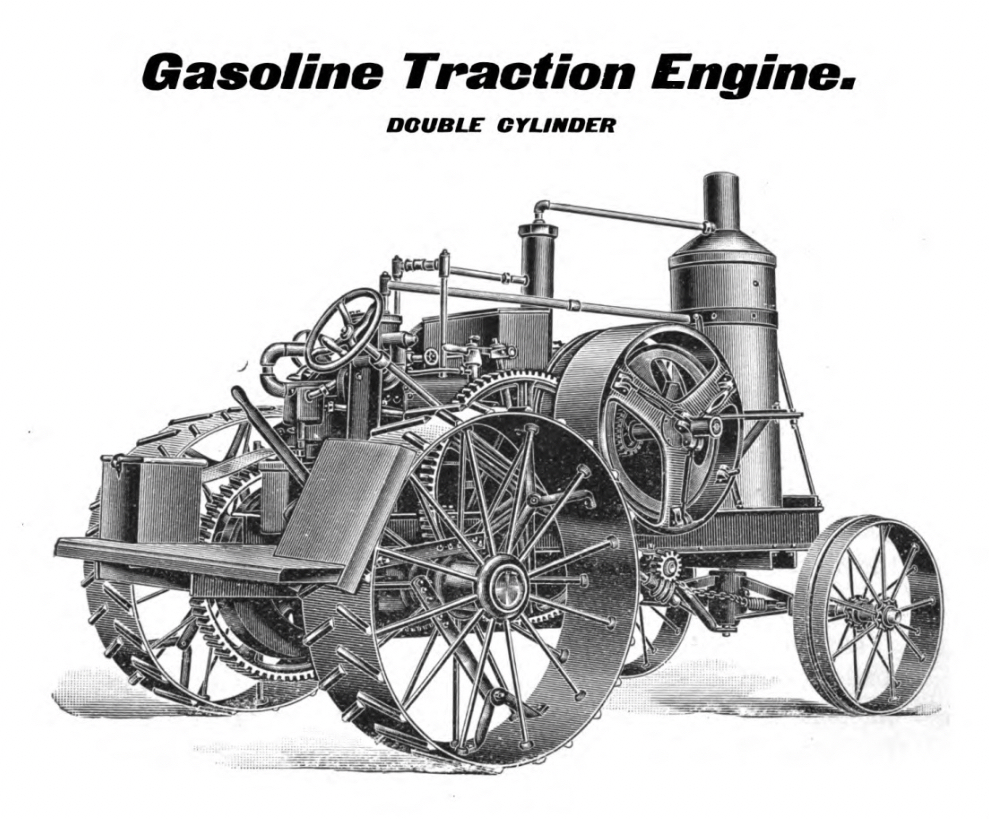
Hart Parr 17-30 Model 3 (1903)

The Hart Parr Model 3 was released in 1903 and is recognized by the American Society of Mechanical Engineers as the first successful farm tractor in the world powered by an internal combustion engine. Fifteen tractors were produced in total. The two horizontal cylinders use a hit-and-miss governor along with an oil-cooled engine. It ran on either gasoline or kerosene. It is 14,000 pounds, and a copy at the Smithsonian is the oldest surviving internal combustion engine tractor in the United States and is held by the Smithsonian's National Museum of American History. It produced 18 horsepower at the draw-bar and 30 at the belt. The tractor at the Smithsonian was used at the George Mitchell farm near Charles City, Iowa, for twenty-three years. Following this, the Oliver Tractor Corporation bought it back and donated it to the Smithsonian in 1960. It was fully restored in 2003, with funding provided by the Hart-Parr/Oliver Collectors Association.

Little by little, the Hart-Parrs began to gather defenders. Some of the first tractors delivered were gaining a reputation of usefulness that far surpassed that of the steamers.

Later Hart-Parrs were denoted with a two-number name, where the first number stood for horsepower at the draw bar and the pulley, respectively.

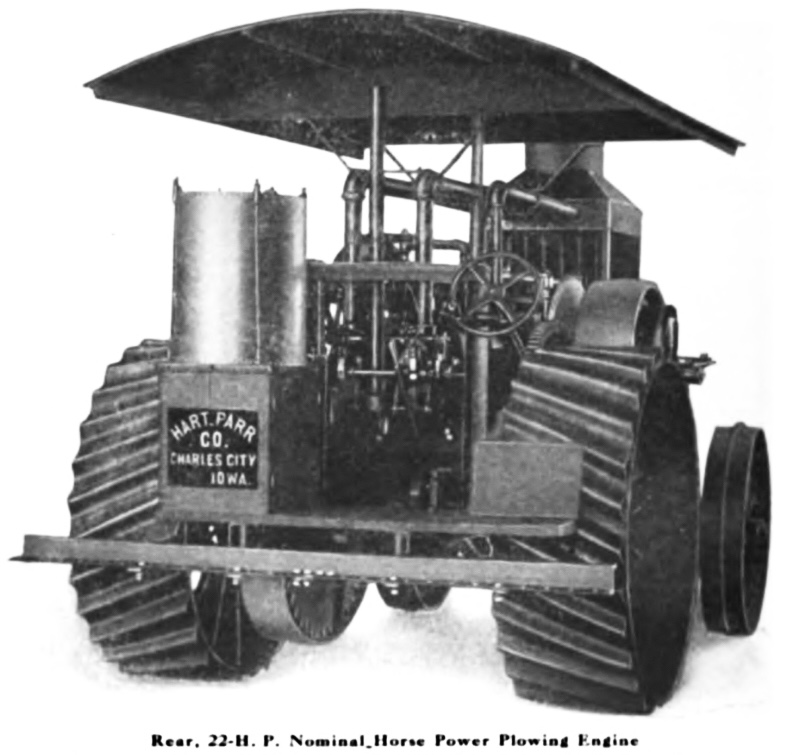
Hart-Parr 22-45 (1903–1911)

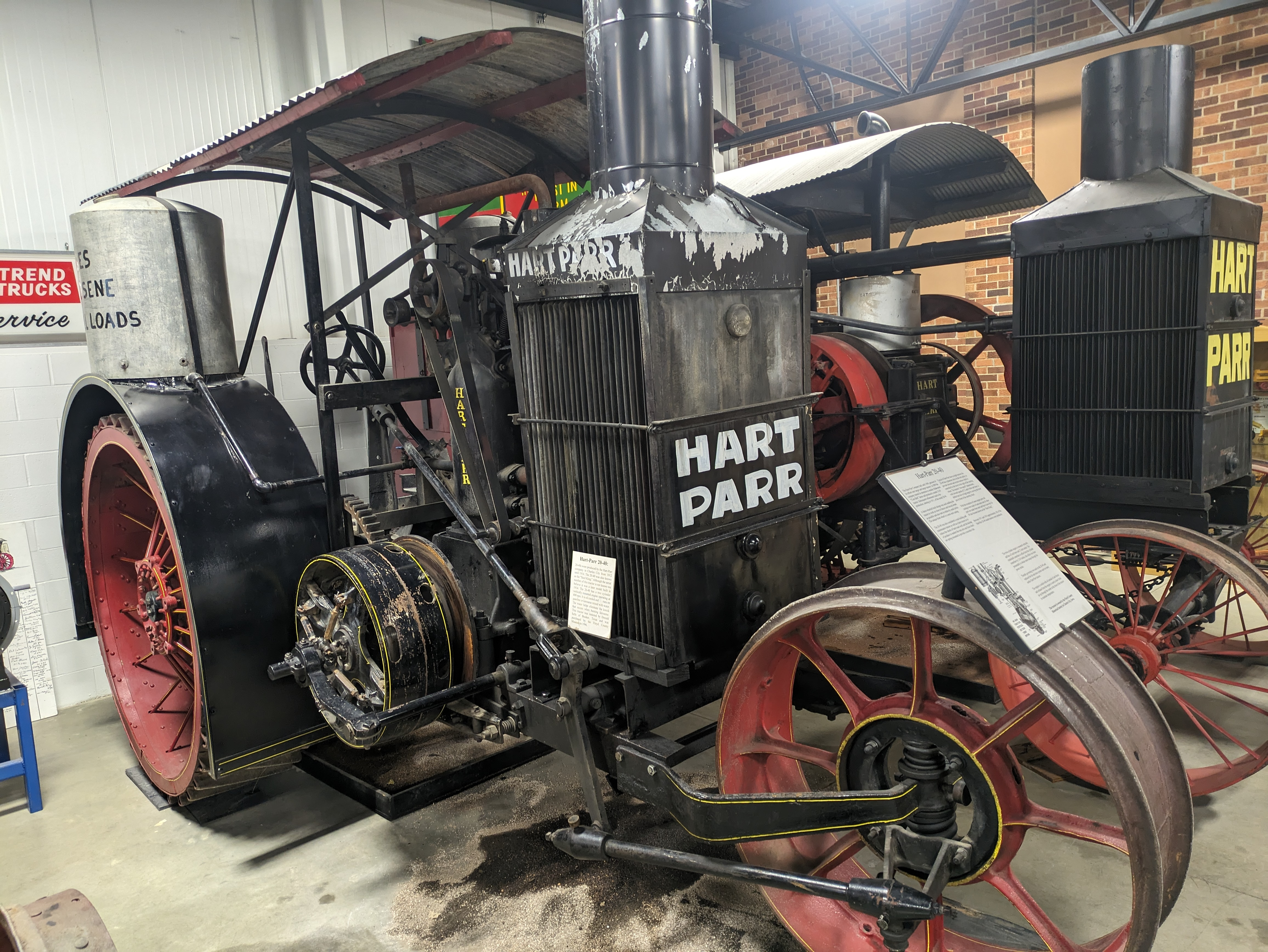
Hart-Parr 20-40 "Steel King" at the Floyd County Museum.

The Hart-Parr 20-40, also called the "Steel King", is a tricycle tractor produced by the Hart-Parr company at their facility in Charles City, Iowa, starting in 1911 and going till 1914. Approximately 197 were produced: 99 in 1912, 49 in 1913, and 49 in 1914. The 20-40 has a two-cylinder vertically mounted engine operating at 400 RPMs. Each cylinder has an 8-inch bore and a 12-inch stroke (1,206.4cuin/19.8L). The centerline of the crankshaft is offset from the cylinder by 2-3/4 inches to increase torque on the power stroke. The engine is oil-cooled rather than water-cooled. The engine runs either gasoline or a mixture of kerosene and water as the water helps eliminate the knock that occurs when burning kerosene. The tractor had two forward speeds, either 2.2 or 4 MPH. The 20-40 was considered a road-building and maintenance tractor as well as a farm tractor. To help reduce shock, the front and rear axles were spring-mounted, a rarity for the time. The name "Steel King" derives from the fact that most of the parts were made from steel or semi-steel, except for some engine parts. It used a Centrifugal governor rather than the older hit-and-miss governors.

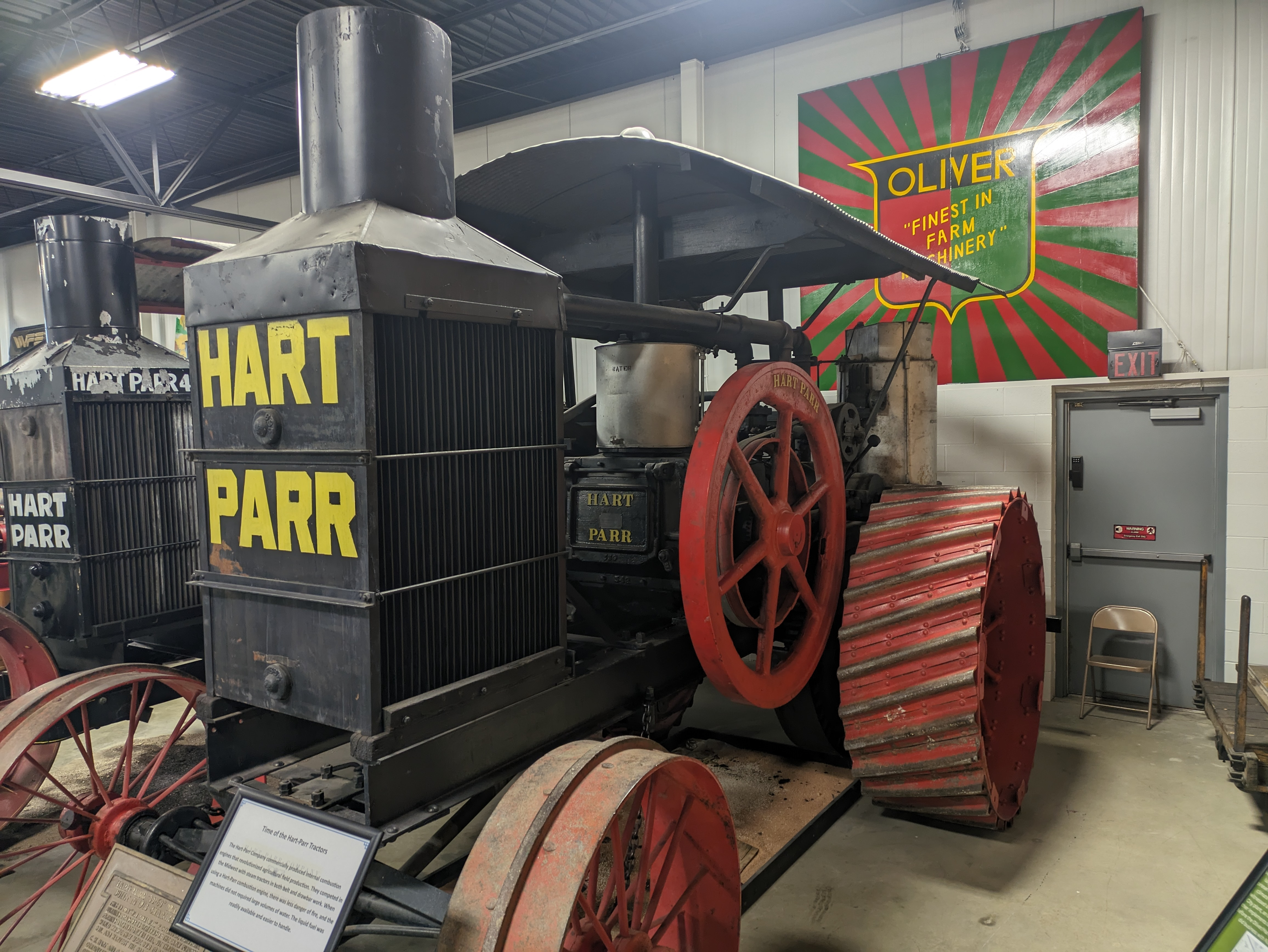
Hart-Parr 30-60 "Old Reliable" at the Floyd County Museum.

The Hart-Parr 30-60 "Old Reliable" is a 2-cylinder kerosene-burning burning that weighed 10 tons and was built from 1907 to 1918. At special request, a further four units were built in 1924. A total of 3,798 units were built. The engine displaces 2,356 cubic inches The tractor is a dual front-wheel style. The 30-60 is so named as it generates 30 horsepower at 300 RPM at the drawbar and 60 at the pulley. The tractor produces over a thousand foot-pounds of torque. It employs a unique elliptical reverser to allow it to reverse. Ignition impulse is provided by a battery during start-up and a dynamo once the flywheel gains speed. It contains 200 quarts of light oil for coolant, so it never freezes.

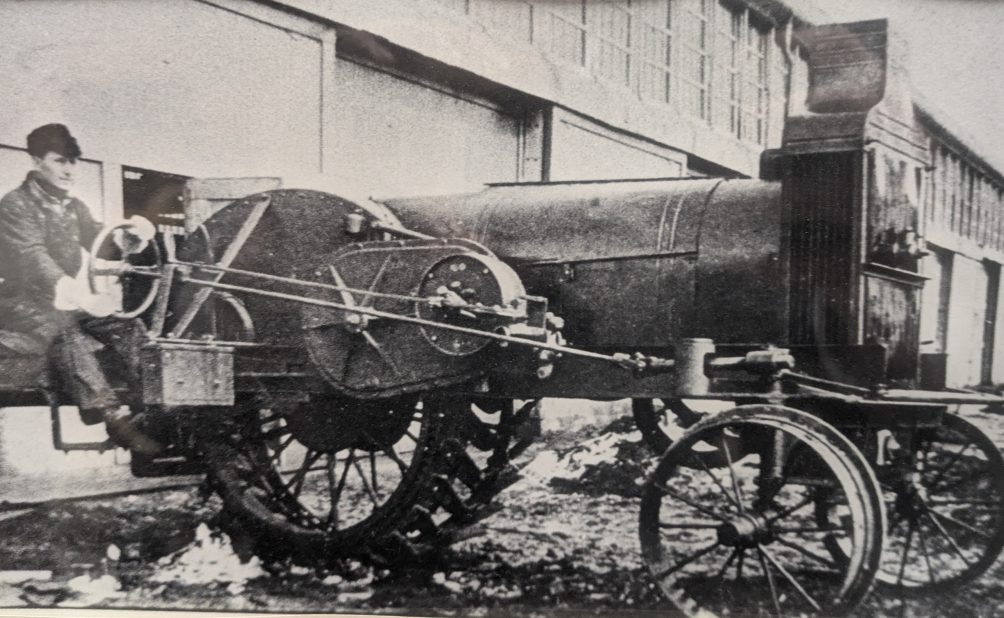
Hart-Parr Little Red Devil

By 1915, the sod-busting or "Prairie" style tractors were becoming obsolete as they were far too big and clumsy for the average farmer of the time. The need for smaller tractors led to the two-cylinder two-stroke "Little Red Devil". It was powered by a thermosyphon water-cooled engine rated at 15–22 horsepower and operating at 600 rpm. The minimilisty tractor lacked valves, a transmission, and a differential; features omitted through the use of cylinder-wall ports actuated by piston movement and a single driven rear wheel with an offset operator's seat. Directional change was achieved by reversing engine rotation at idle, and the tractor offered speeds of approximately 3⅓ and 2¼ mph. It was a complete failure, and the tractors were recalled.

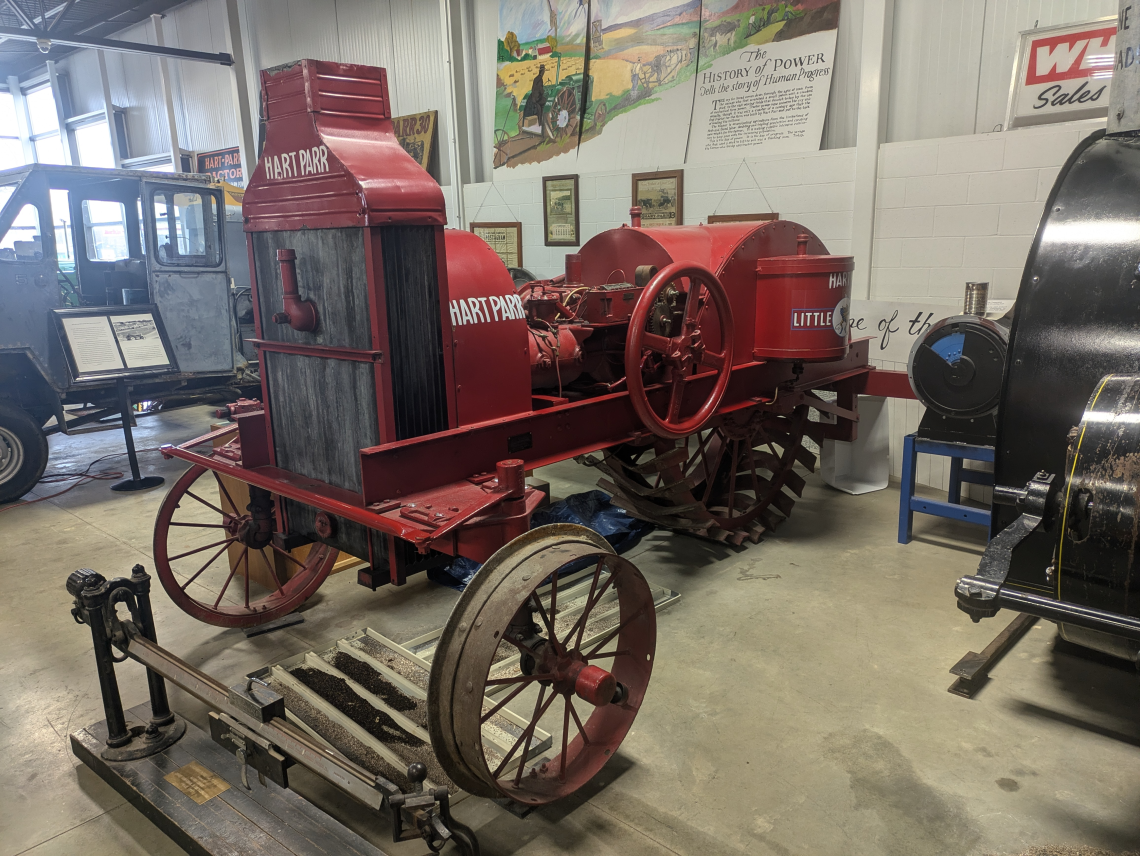
Hart-Parr Little Red Devil picture (front left) at the Floy County Museum

In 1918, Hart-Parr released the "New Hart Parr" 12-25 model. This tractor was significantly smaller than the old "Prairie" style tractor. The 12-25 model formed the basis for all subsequent Hart-Parr tractors and was equipped with a two-cylinder, slow-speed, unpressurized water-cooled engine. It used forced feed lubrication and open gears used to drive the rear wheels. As required by law in the state of Nebraska, it was tested at the University of Nebraska and re-rated at 15–30. The 15-30 design was upgraded in 1924 to become the 16-30. The design was again upgraded in 1926 to become the 18-36.

Approximately 6000 tractors were produced in 1928.

Hart Parr built the 18-36 from 1926 to 1930. The 18-36 was the company's most popular tractor during this time period and was rated at 18.10 HP and the draw bar and 36.53 HP at the pulley.

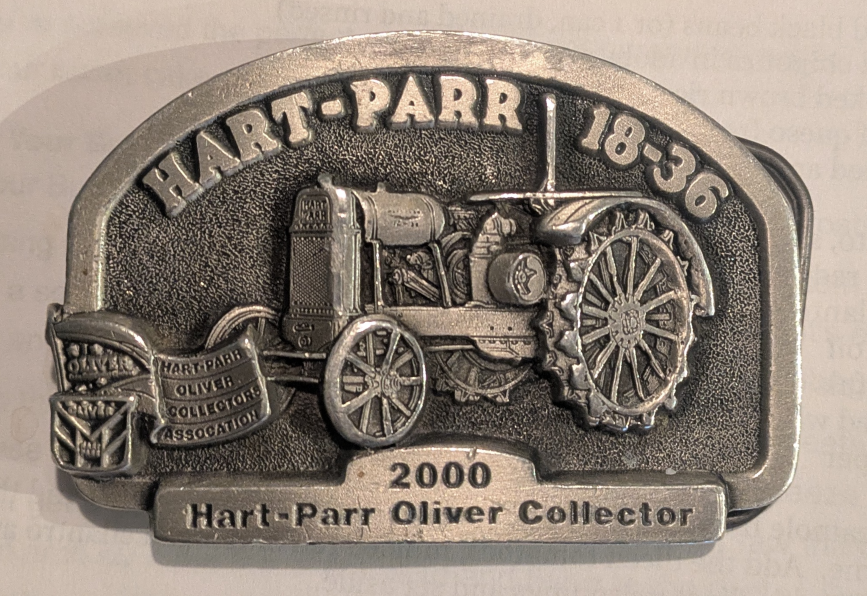
A belt buckle with a Hart-Parr 18-36

W.H. Williams, Sales Manager in 1907, decided the words "traction engine" were vague and too long to be used in press releases, so he coined the word "Tractor", a combination of the words "traction" and "power", instead. For this reason, and because the Charles City plant was the first to be continuously and exclusively used for tractor production, Hart-Parr often used the slogan "Founders of the Tractor Industry" in their advertising.

=== Nichols and Shepard Company ===
In 1848, John Nichols opened a blacksmith shop in Battle Creek, Michigan. In the blacksmith shop, John Nichols began making various farm tools for local farmers. He built his first thresher/separator in 1852. The business was successful from the start, so successful that some time in the 1850s he took on a partner by the name of David Shepard. Together they formed a partnership known as Nichols, Shepard and Company which manufactured farm machinery, steam engines and mill machinery. The first thresher/separator of small grains (largely wheat and oats) was developed in about 1831 by the Pitts brothers—Hiram and John Pitts of Buffalo, New York. However, this early thresher, called the "ground hog," was quite unlike the conventional thresher/separators that developed since that time. For instance, the ground hog's separating unit was largely a slatted apron that pulled the grain across a screen. John Nichols and David Shepard realized that the apron style separator was not a technology that was going to work. Consequently, in 1857, the Nichols and Shepard Company developed the first "vibrator" separating unit for the small grain thresher. This vibrator-style of separator soon became universally adopted by all other thresher/separator manufacturers. The Nichols and Shepard Company received a patent from the United States government for their "Vibrator" grain separator on January 7, 1862. The company also obtained a number of other patents for other advances in the thresher/separator technology, for original improvements in steam engine traction technology. During the 1920s, the Nichols and Shepard Company developed a successfully functioning corn picker. Following the acquisition of the Nichols and Shepard Company by the Oliver Company. This corn picker became the direct ancestor of the famous Oliver cornpicker.

== Later acquisitions ==
For the first couple of years, the tractors carried the Oliver-Hart-Parr designation, but the Hart-Parr essence soon disappeared, just as an entirely new line of purely Oliver tractors made their appearance.

=== McKenzie Manufacturing Company ===
Following the 1929 merger of the four companies into the Oliver Farm Equipment Company, several other corporate acquisitions were made by the new company over a period of years. The first of these post-merger acquisitions occurred a mere year later, in 1930, when the Oliver Farm Equipment Company purchased the McKenzie Manufacturing Company of La Crosse, Wisconsin. The McKenzie Manufacturing Company was a leading maker of potato planting and potato harvesting equipment. Acquisition of the McKenzie Company broadened the line of farm equipment offered by Oliver to include potato diggers which were then sold under the "Oliver" name. However, following the 1930 merger production of the "Oliver" potato diggers moved out of La Crosse, Wisconsin to Chicago, Illinois.

=== Ann Arbor Agricultural Machine Company ===
In 1943, the Oliver Farm Equipment Company purchased the Ann Arbor Agricultural Machine Company of Ann Arbor, Michigan. Founded in 1885, the Ann Arbor Agricultural Machine Company became the leading manufacturer of "hay presses" or stationary balers.

=== Cletrac ===
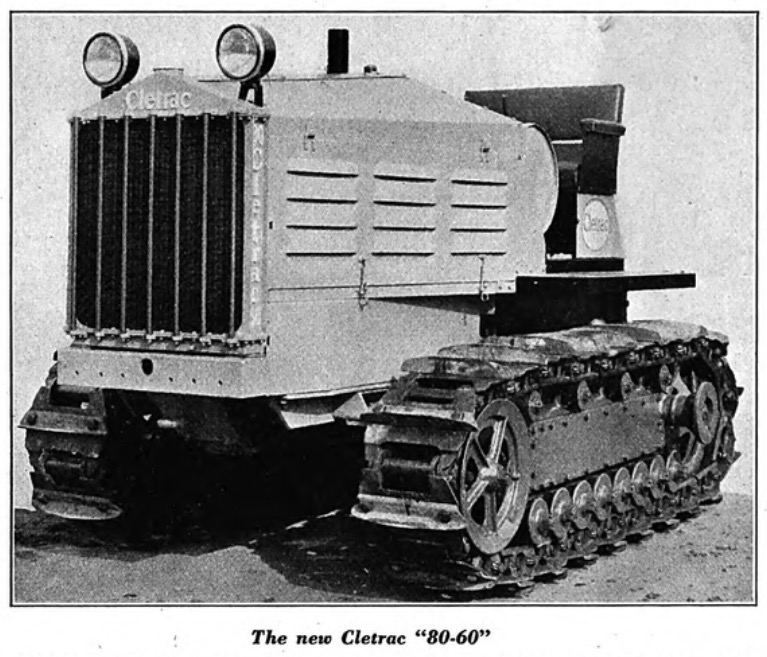
Cletrac 80-60 (1930-1932)

The Cleveland Tractor Company was created by Rollin H. White in 1916. In 1918 the name was switched to Cletrac. Later they became a part of the Oliver family in 1944. At the October 3, 1944, stockholders meeting, with approval of the stockholders, the corporate name was changed to "The Oliver Corporation". In 1962 White Motors bought Oliver, thus bringing Cletrac back to the White Family. Unfortunately, they didn't seem to miss Cletrac at all, and only three years later, crawler tractor production ended at Charles City in 1965.

=== A. B. Farquhar Company ===
In 1952 the A. B. Farquhar Company was sold to the Oliver Corporation. Founded in York, Pennsylvania, in the 1850s as W. W. Dingee & Co, in 1861 young businessman Arthur Briggs Farquhar bought the business and enlarged it during the Civil War as the Pennsylvania Agricultural Works. In 1889, the A. B. Farquhar Company began building threshing machines and other farm machinery. Later, the company started the production of cultivators for farm use (especially potato harvesting equipment). Farquhar produced some steam engines early then moved onto the production of traction engines.

== Product development ==
=== Crawlers ===
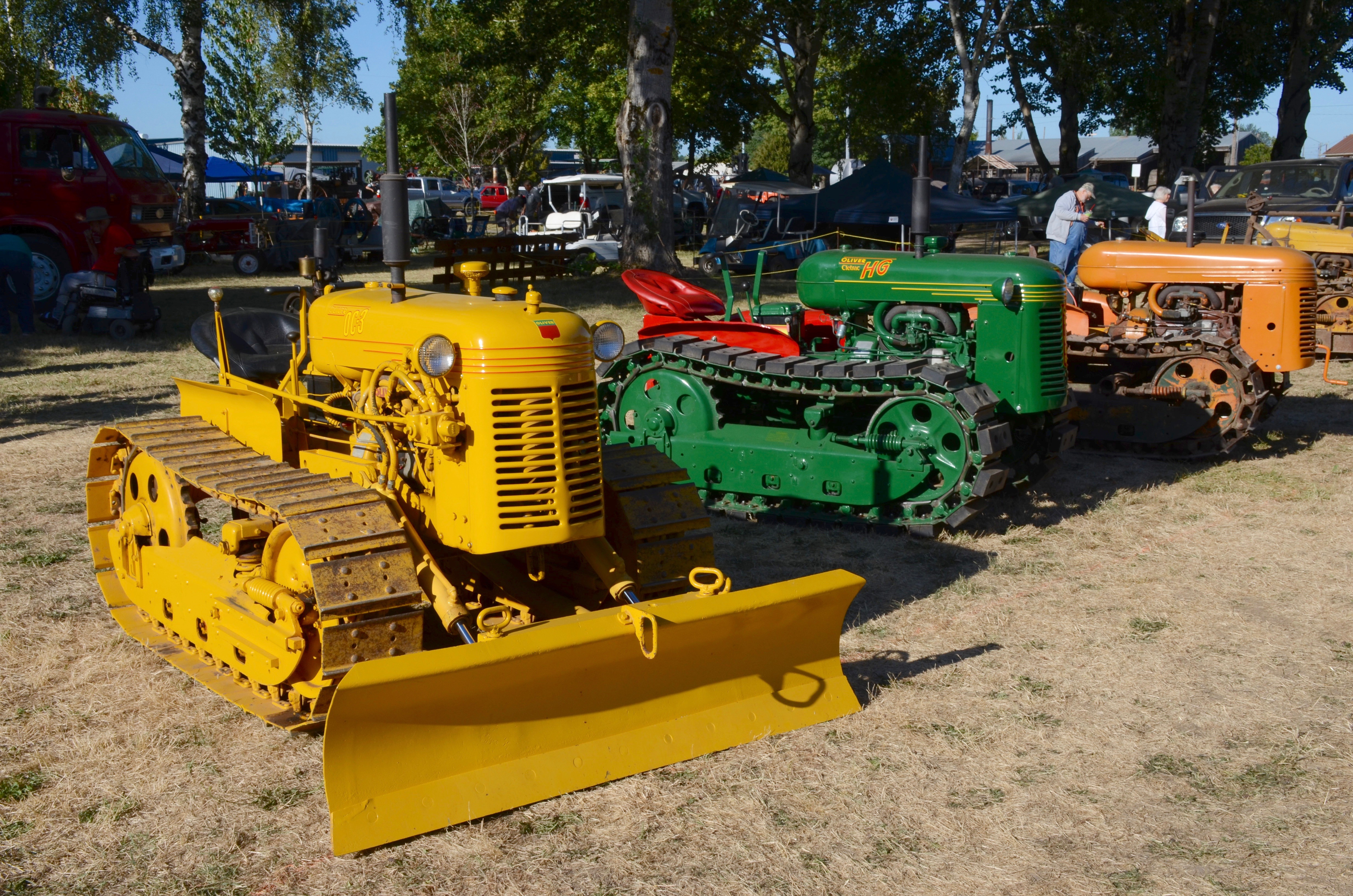
Three Oliver-built crawler-type tractors on display at Antique Powerland, in Oregon

In 1944 Oliver acquired the Cleveland Tractor Company (Cletrac). They continued production of the existing Cletrac HG model until 1951, and based on the experience with M2 high-speed tractor modified it to run on rubber tracks in 1945, but the result turned out to be ahead of its time, and its small-scale production was discontinued in 1948. The agricultural Cletrac HG gradually evolved into the more industrial Oliver OC-3 which was produced from 1951 through 1957.

In 1956 Oliver announced the slightly larger OC-4 with a four-cylinder Hercules IXB3 engine. In late 1957 (diesel) and early 1958 (gas) OC-4's came equipped with 3 cylinder Hercules 130 engines. Most noticeable was the change to a 'beefier' more industrial front grille. In 1962 at the new Charles City, Iowa, crawler production line, the last incarnation of the OC-4 was produced. It was a sturdier industrial model named the Series B. They were powered with the same 3 cylinder Hercules GO-130 and DD-130 engines of the mid-series models. The OC-4 product line was discontinued in 1965.

Oliver also produced larger crawlers: the OC-6 from 1953 to 1960; the OC-9 from 1959 to 1965; the OC-12 from 1954 to 1961; and the OC-15 and the large OC-18.

All crawler production was halted in 1965.

=== Tractors ===
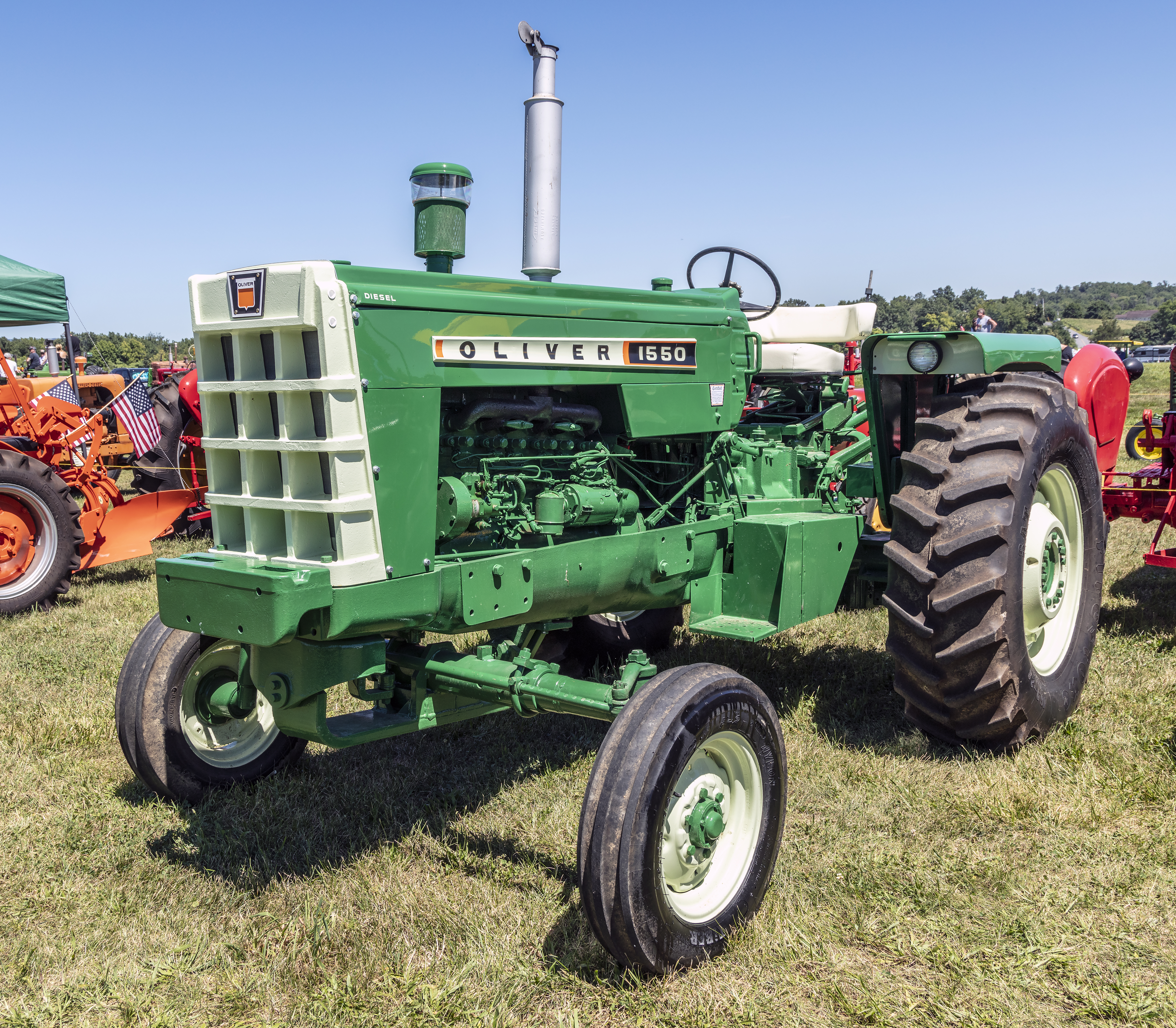
Oliver 1550 tractor

In 1948, Oliver was ready with an entirely new line of tractors. These were built over the successes of the past, including the Oliver 60, 70, and 80 tractors.

The latter was even built with a diesel engine, although very few were sold. However, in the 1950s, Oliver was an industry leader through their promotion of diesel power. Oliver led the industry in the sale of diesel tractors for several years.

The Oliver 66, 77 and 88 tractors of the 1948 to 1954 period, marked an entirely new series of Fleetline models. The 77 and 88 could be bought with either gasoline or diesel engines. During 1954, the company upgraded these tractors with the new "Super" series models, and added the Oliver Super 55. It was the company's first compact utility tractor.

In 1958, Oliver began marketing the new 660, 770, 880, 990, and other new models.

=== Non-agricultural products ===
During the war years of the 1940s Oliver Corporation expanded rapidly into non-agricultural production, most notably in the defense sector. By 1947, the Oliver Corporation employed 9,000 with 37% of Oliver's production for defense contracts. Product lines included graders, forklifts, road rollers, crawlers, and power units incorporated into products by other companies.

Oliver also built airplane fuselages for Boeing RB-47E Reconnaissance planes at a Battle Creek, Michigan aviation division set up exclusively for defense contracts. The Charles City, Iowa plant assembled transmissions for the 25-ton crane carriers and built and assembled 106 mm recoilless rifle gun mounts for the Army. The Cleveland, Ohio plant built the MG-1 crawler for the Army as well as tank parts. The Gilroy, California plant produced the 76 mm guns for the Walker Bulldog tank. The Shelbyville, Ohio, plant built 155 mm Howitzer gun parts.

== Acquisition by White Motor Corporation ==
=== Oliver Corporation ===
White Motor Corporation of Cleveland, Ohio had a long history of truck manufacturing. On November 1, 1960, White Motor acquired Oliver, changed the name to Oliver Corporation, and made it a wholly owned, separately operating subsidiary of the White Motor Corporation.

=== Further mergers, acquisitions, and branding ===
White also acquired Cockshutt Farm Equipment of Canada in February 1962, and it was made a subsidiary of Oliver Corporation. Cockshutt had also previously, in 1928, marketed tractors made by Hart-Parr, and again from 1934 through the late 1940s, it marketed tractors made by Oliver, only changing the paint color to red, and changing the name tags to Cockshutt. Minneapolis-Moline became a wholly owned subsidiary of White Motor Corporation in 1963. The Cockshutt production line was dropped and went back to using Olivers painted red. The Minneapolis-Moline and Oliver lines were blended until there was virtually no difference between them.

In 1960, the new four-digit tractor models appeared. Among them were the 1600, 1800 and 1900 models. In 1969, White Motor Corporation formed White Farm Equipment Company, almost immediately after a transitional period when virtually identical tractors and combines were marketed under different trade names. A few models were sold as Oliver, Minneapolis, or Cockshutt, the major difference being the paint colour. As the transaction continued, the White name was more and more applied to the tractor line, with the Oliver 2255, also known as the White 2255, being the last purely "Oliver" tractor. With the introduction of the White 4-150 Field Boss in 1974, the White name would be used, henceforth to the exclusion of all others.

White Motor Corporation shut down the original Oliver Chilled Plow Works factory (factory no. 1) in 1985. The Oliver buildings remained vacant until 2002 when most were demolished to make way for an industrial park. The Oliver powerhouse is now restored and occupied by Rose Brick & Material.

FIAT tractors were marketed under the Oliver name in the mid-1970s, such as the Oliver 1465 tractor. Oliver tractors with FIAT gages were available in 1970.

Today White is an AGCO brand. AGCO was formed in 1990 by former Deutz-Allis executives. The executives took over Deutz-Allis and then purchased the White tractor line in 1991. The White tractor line was produced by AGCO from 1991 through 2001 when the White line was merged with AGCO-Allis to create the AGCO brand. The White name continues on under AGCO with the White Planter division.

== Legacy ==
More information about Oliver Tractors can be found in Oliver Heritage Magazine.

== See also ==
- Oliver OC-9
