= Oliver 80 =

Row crop tractor

- Type: Row-crop agricultural tractor
- Manufacturer: Oliver Farm Equipment Company
- Production: 1938-1948
- Weight: 4,800 pounds (2,200 kg)
- Propulsion: Rear wheels
- Engine model: Oliver 2.0L
- Gross power: 43 horsepower (32 kW)
- PTO power: 38.78 horsepower (28.92 kW) (belt)
- Drawbar power: 29.92 horsepower (22.31 kW)
- Drawbar pull: 3,785 pounds (1,717 kg)
- NTTL test: 300 (gasoline)

The Oliver 80 row-crop tractors was a model of agricultural tractors produced from 1938 to 1963 by the Oliver Farm Equipment Company. The model 80 was a development of the Oliver Hart-Parr industrial tractor, for agricultural use. The initial 80 was rated for three 14-inch plows, making it a medium-sized tractor. By the time the Super 88 development was introduced, it was rated for six plow bottoms, making it a heavy tractor.

== Description ==
The Oliver 80 was introduced in 1938 by developing the existing Oliver Hart-Parr 80 industrial tractor for row-crop use. The 80 was equipped with a Waukesha-Oliver four-cylinder 334-cubic-inch (5,470-cubic-centimetre) engine, developing 43 horsepower (32 kW), with three or four-gear transmissions. The original 80 was unstyled, with an exposed radiator and steering gear, as was the industrial tractor. Versions were produced for row crops with narrow front wheels and standard models with a wide front axle. Engines could be obtained for gasoline or kerosene/distillate fuels. Production took place at Oliver's Charles City, Iowa plant. A diesel-engined version was introduced in 1940 with a Buda-Lanova 4.9L engine The Oliver 35 was an industrial tractor version of the 80 from 1937 to 1945.

Starting in 1937, the Oliver 80 was sold in Canada by Cockshutt as the Cockshutt 80, replacing the Oliver-built 18-28. The 80 never received any styling treatment. Options were the same as to Oliver tractors', and all were built in Charles City.

== Oliver 88 ==
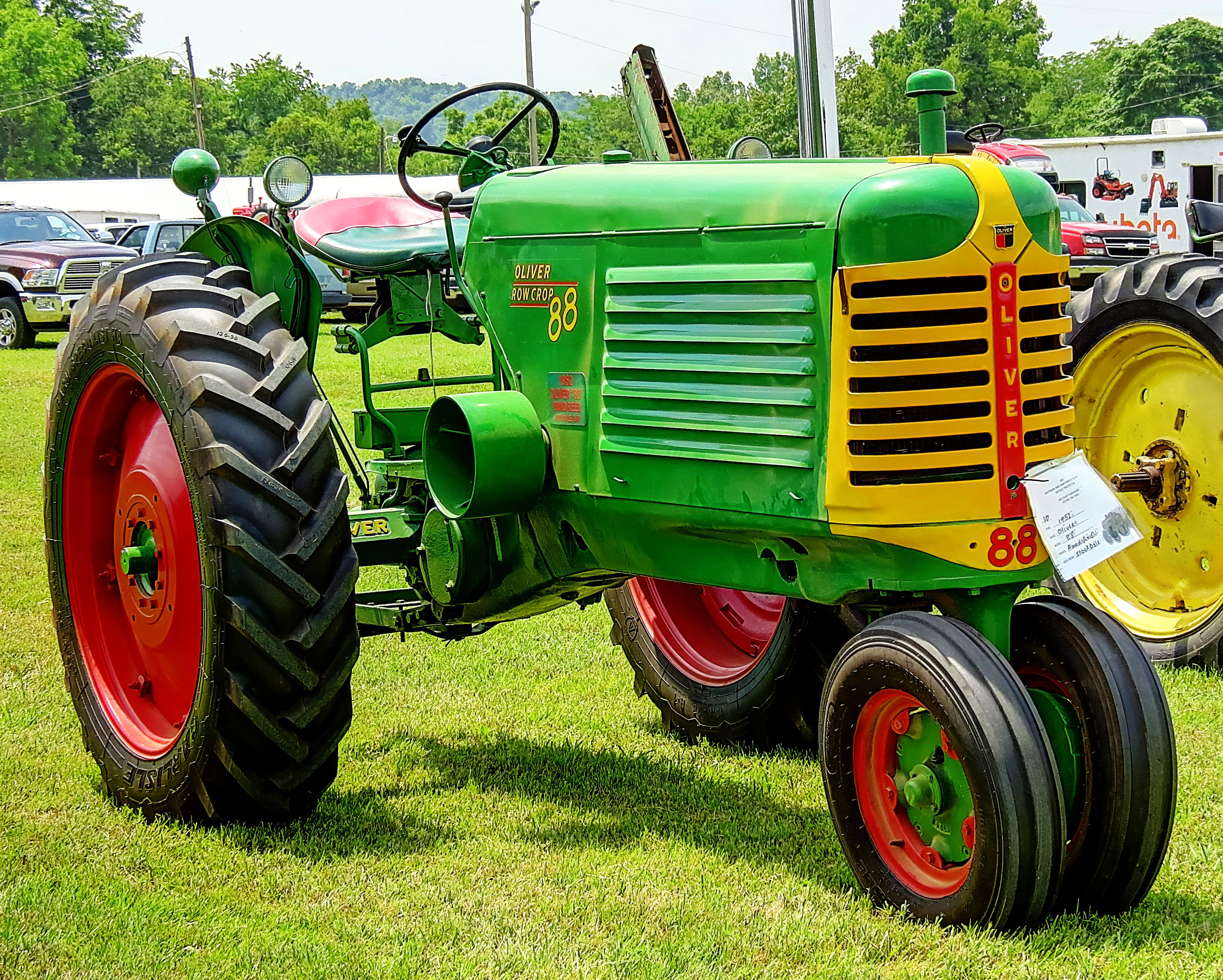
Oliver 88

The Oliver 88 was introduced in 1947, and was restyled in 1948 with "Fleetline" styling that enclosed the mechanical systems. Early models in the restyled run used the swept-back Fleetline style, which was updated with a more upright posture in later years. Engines came with gasoline, kerosene/distillate, diesel and LP gas options. The 88's diesel engine had six cylinders, and most models had six-speed transmissions. Gross power for the gasoline engine increased to 46 horsepower (34 kW). The 88 was offered with single, dual-front-wheel, and wide-front row-crop versions and a standard version, as well as orchard, high-crop and industrial versions. Hydraulic hitch operation was introduced in 1949. The 1954 price was about $3,000.

== Oliver Super 88 ==
The Super 88 was introduced in 1954. Power rose to 62 horsepower (46 kW) for the gasoline engine. The kerosene/distillate version was dropped from the line. The Super 88 was rated for a six-bottom plow. The Super 88 sold for about $4,000 in 1958.

The Super series was visually the same as the 88, but the wheels were now painted green and the side panels removed.

== Oliver 880 ==
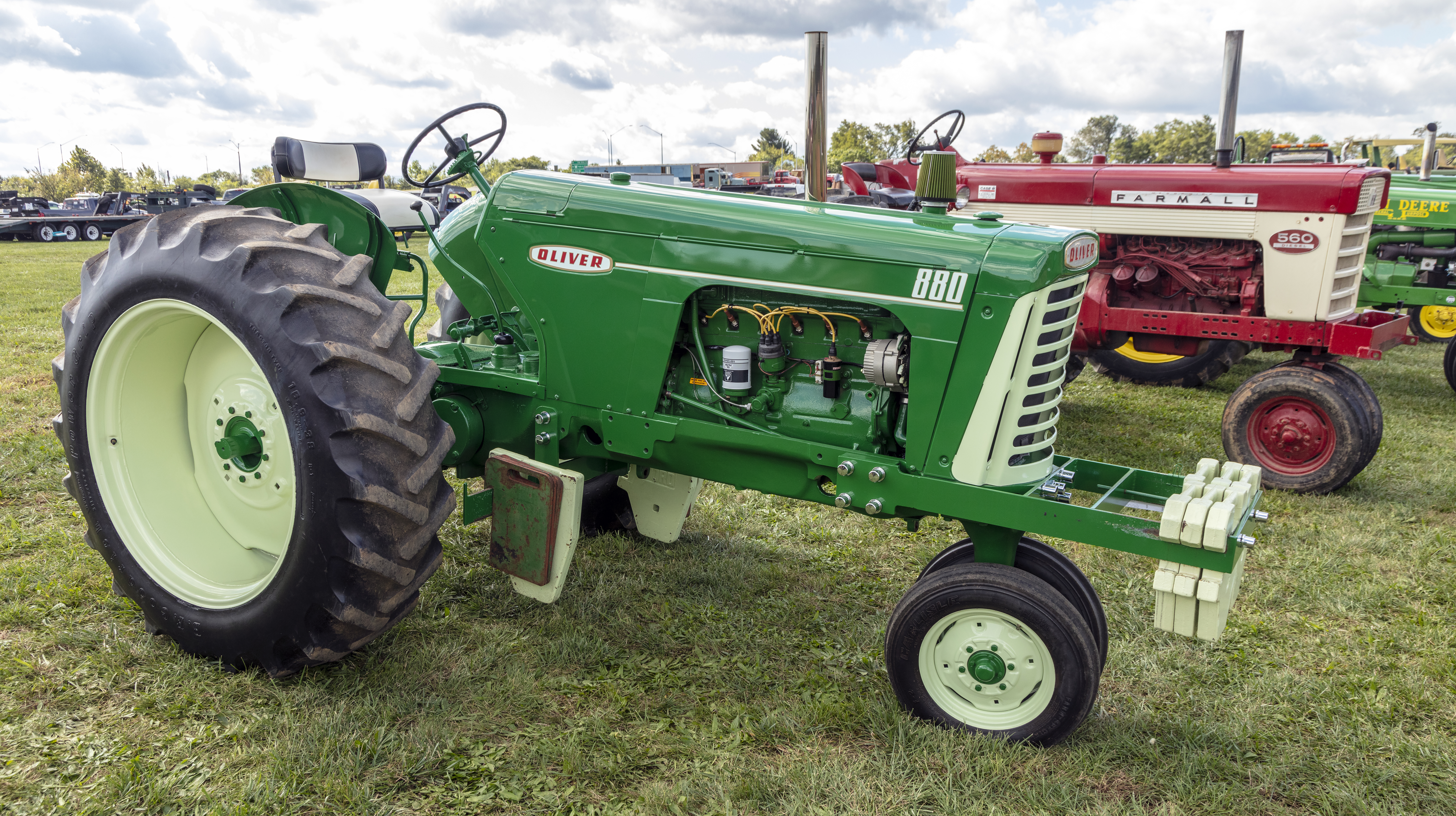
Oliver 880

A three-number sequence was introduced in 1958 with the Oliver 880. The new line was more squared-off in appearance, retaining the green body and replacing previous models' yellow and red highlights with a green-tinged white for grilles and wheels. The 880 featured transmission improvements, as well as hitch and accessory refinements. The 880 was produced until 1963, with row-crop, standard-axle Wheatland and high-crop models. Selling price in 1963 was about $5,000. An industrial 880 was produced from 1958 to 1963. Towards the end of production, the grill was changed from a horizontal slatted design, to the cast iron checkerboard.

== Oliver 1800 ==
The Oliver 1800, manufactured from 1960 to 1964. The 1800 A was essentially a restyled 880 with some adjustments in engine and accessories, and increased power. The 1800 B was produced in 1963 with increased power. The 1964 1800 C was the final model and year, with improved steering and hydraulics, selling for about $5,900. An industrial 1800 was produced from 1960 to 1964.

== Oliver 1850 ==
The Oliver 1850 was an upgraded version of the 1800 C produced from 1964 to 1969. The main difference was the introduction of Oliver's Over-Under Hydraul Shift partial powershift transmission.

== Oliver 1855 ==
The final iteration of the model 80 produced by Oliver was the 1855, introduced in 1969. During the production of the 1850, Oliver was acquired by White motors, the 1855 resulted in White's involvement. Once more, not much visually changed. The grill now incorporated headlights, the emblem had a horizontal green stripe through the middle, and a small tag with the name "WHITE" above the Oliver badge.
