= Oliver 70 =

Row crop tractor

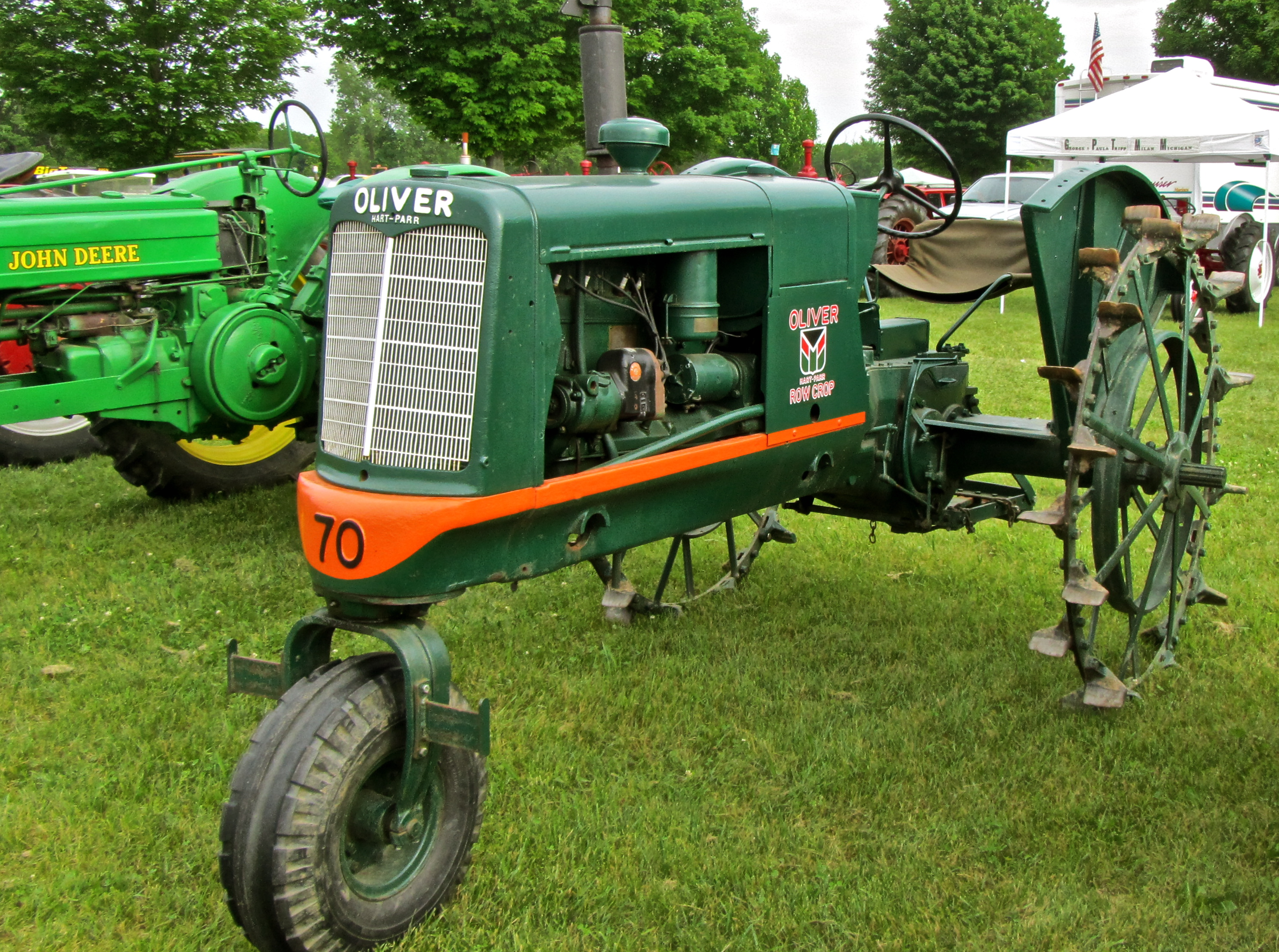
- An Oliver Hart-Parr 70 with a single front wheel and steel rear wheels
- Type: Row-crop agricultural tractor
- Manufacturer: Oliver Farm Equipment Company
- Production: 1935-1967
- Length: 91.25 inches (231.8 cm) (wheelbase)
- Weight: 4,400 pounds (2,000 kg)
- Propulsion: Rear wheels
- Engine model: Oliver 3.3L
- Gross power: 33 horsepower (25 kW)
- PTO power: 28.4 horsepower (21.2 kW) (belt)
- Drawbar power: 21.93 horsepower (16.35 kW)
- Drawbar pull: 3,120 pounds (1,420 kg)
- NTTL test: 252 (gasoline)
- Succeeded by: Oliver 77

The Oliver 70 series of row-crop tractors was a series of large agricultural tractors produced from 1935 to 1967 by the Oliver Farm Equipment Company. Oliver tractors were known for their powerful engines compared to competitors, and their attention to styling. The Oliver Hart-Parr 70 marked the beginning of a strikingly-styled series of tractors that were produced under both the Oliver and the Cockshutt names. Oliver's emphasis on styling strongly influenced offerings by competing brands such as Farmall and John Deere.

As was the case with most tractor brands of the 1940s and 1950s, tractor offerings were incrementally upgraded under a series of names for essentially the same machine, with changes in styling and the addition of features and power. The 70 was progressively rebranded as the 77, Super 77 and 770 through its life.

== Oliver Hart-Parr 70 ==
The Oliver Hart-Parr 70 was introduced in 1935, with emphasis on the "Oliver" brand. The 70 featured an unprecedented six-cylinder engine, with options for an electric starter and lights. The 70 was offered as a row-crop tractor with narrow front wheels, a standard tractor with a wide front axle, an orchard tractor with wheel skirting and a low profile, and a high-crop tractor with high clearance. The 200-cubic-inch (3,300-cubic-centimetre) displacement engine developed 33 horsepower (25 kW), with four and six-gear transmissions available. The HC engine ran on 70 octane gasoline, providing the "70" series designation. A KD version operated on kerosene and distillate fuel. The tractors were styled with automobile-like sheet metal full hood enclosures, giving them a streamlined look, and car-like controls. A competition was held to determine the 70's paint scheme, with voting at county fair exhibits promoting the tractor. Voting settled on a green body with red trim. The green body color was continued throughout Oliver production. The 70 line was manufactured at Oliver's Charles City, Iowa plant. Despite the 70's features, the model was outsold by the equally innovative and less expensive Ford 9N tractor.

Starting in 1935, the 70 was marketed in Canada by Cockshutt with Cockshutt Hart-Parr branding. Initially sold only in row-crop configuration, it was sold in standard and orchard configurations by 1936.

=== Styled Oliver 70 ===
The 70 was restyled in 1937, with strikingly streamlined sheet metal. The "Hart-Parr" branding was discontinued, and the tractors were sold entirely under the Oliver brand. 70 series tractors were marketed in Canada as Cockshutt tractors. As before, the 70 was offered in row-crop, standard, orchard, and high-clearance models, with the addition of a model optimized for airport use. The newer 70s incorporated standardized configurations for hitch and PTO equipment. The 70 cost about $3,000 in 1954.

The styled Oliver 70 was introduced at the same time in Canada under Cockshutt branding and colors as the Cockshutt 70. All were built in Charles City. Demand was high for the model, and some were delivered in Oliver green and red colors until 1940.

== Oliver 77 ==
The Oliver 77 was introduced in 1947, replacing the 70 with minimal changes, apart from styling updates, a standard three-point hitch, and an option for an electric equipment lift. Rated for three 14" plows, it was initially offered with gasoline and kerosene/distillate engines. The kerosene/distillate model was replaced with a diesel version in 1949, and an LP gas version was introduced in 1952. Row-crop, standard and orchard models were offered. Production of the 77 ran until 1954. The price in 1954 was approximately $3,000.

== Oliver Super 77 ==
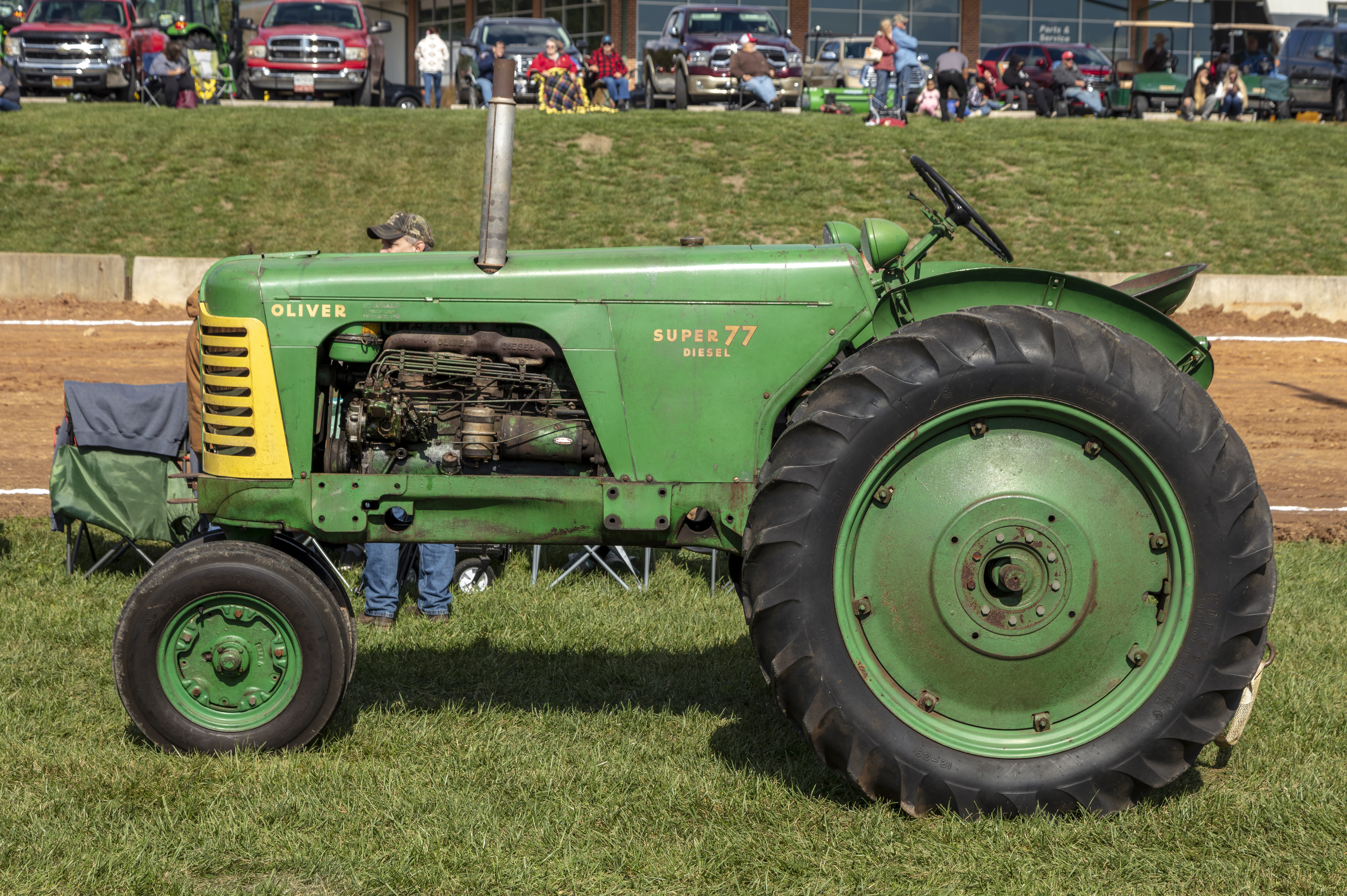
Oliver Super 77 diesel

The Super 77 was introduced in 1954. A six-cylinder engine continued to be used, with 216-cubic-inch (3,540-cubic-centimetre) displacement and 44 horsepower (33 kW). The engine compartment was no longer fully shrouded with bodywork. Versions included row-crop, standard (Super 77-S), orchard (Super 77-O), high-crop and industrial configurations. The price in 1958 was about $3,500.

== Oliver 770 ==
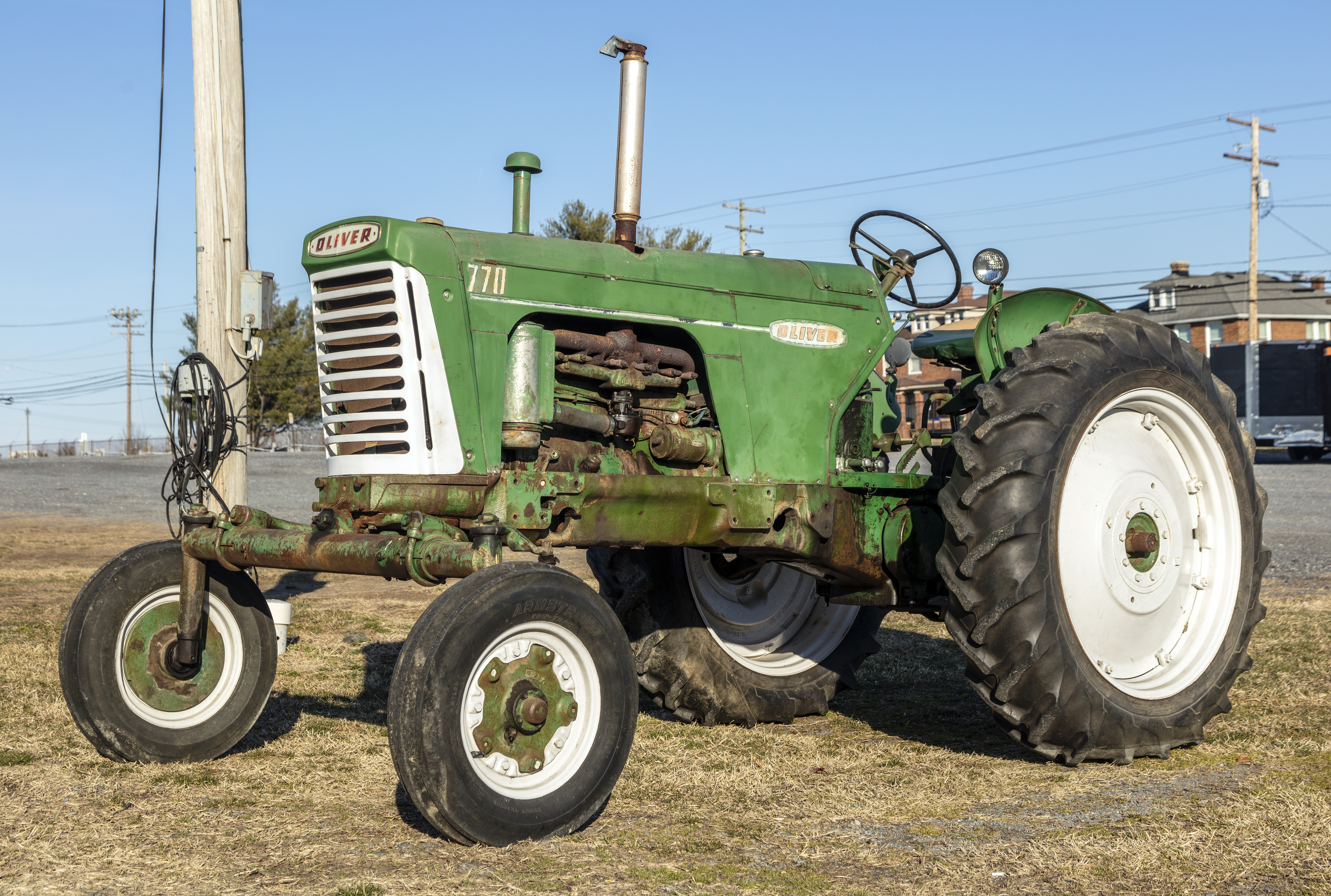
Oliver 770

A three-number sequence was introduced in 1958 with the Oliver 770. The new line was more squared-off in appearance, retaining the green body and replacing previous models' yellow and red highlights with a green-tinged white for grilles and wheels. The engines remained the same, with a slightly higher RPM and compression ratio, yielding about 10% more power. The transmission was offered with a torque amplifier. During this time Oliver, Cockshutt and White were combined, and the 770 was sold as the Cockshutt 770 in Canada. The 770 was produced until 1967, by which time the Oliver brand was absorbed into White. The 1967 price was about $4,345. Oliver produced an industrial version of the 770 from 1958 to 1967.
