= Oliver Heritage Magazine =

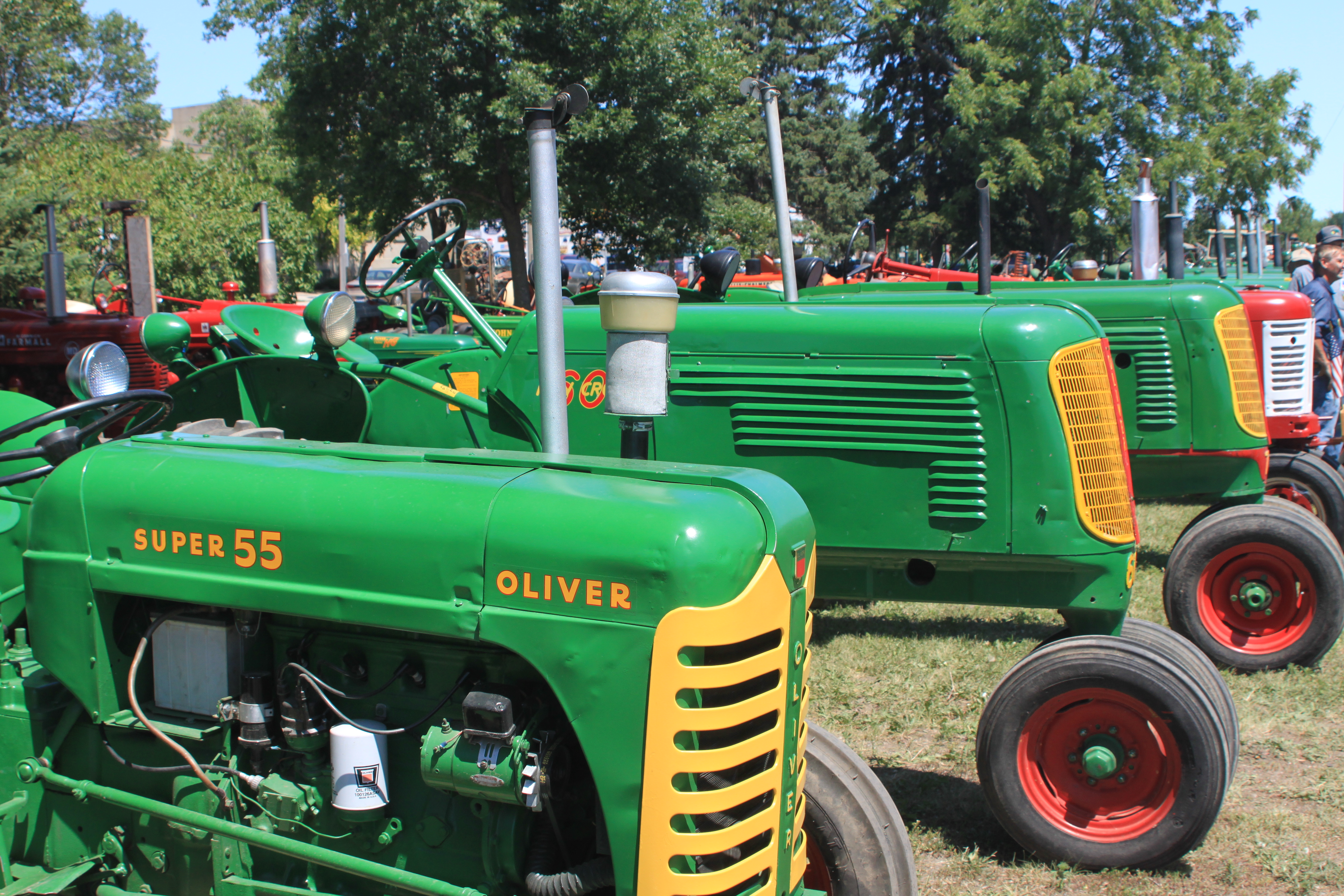
Retired Oliver tractors on display

Oliver Heritage Magazine is a bi-monthly publication dedicated to the users, collectors, and enthusiasts of all tractors and equipment under the Oliver flag, including Oliver, White, Hart-Parr, and Cletrac. From James Oliver's first chilled plow to the White Field Boss, this full-color magazine presents technical articles, history, personal stories, and tractor and machinery reviews. Founded in 2004 and with subscribers worldwide, current circulation is 11,000. Oliver Heritage is a must-have publication for anyone interested in the history of the Oliver line of machinery. Current and founding editor is Sherry Schaefer, a renowned Oliver expert who has also written and contributed to several agricultural books and publications.
