= Oliver 1900 =

Row-crop tractor

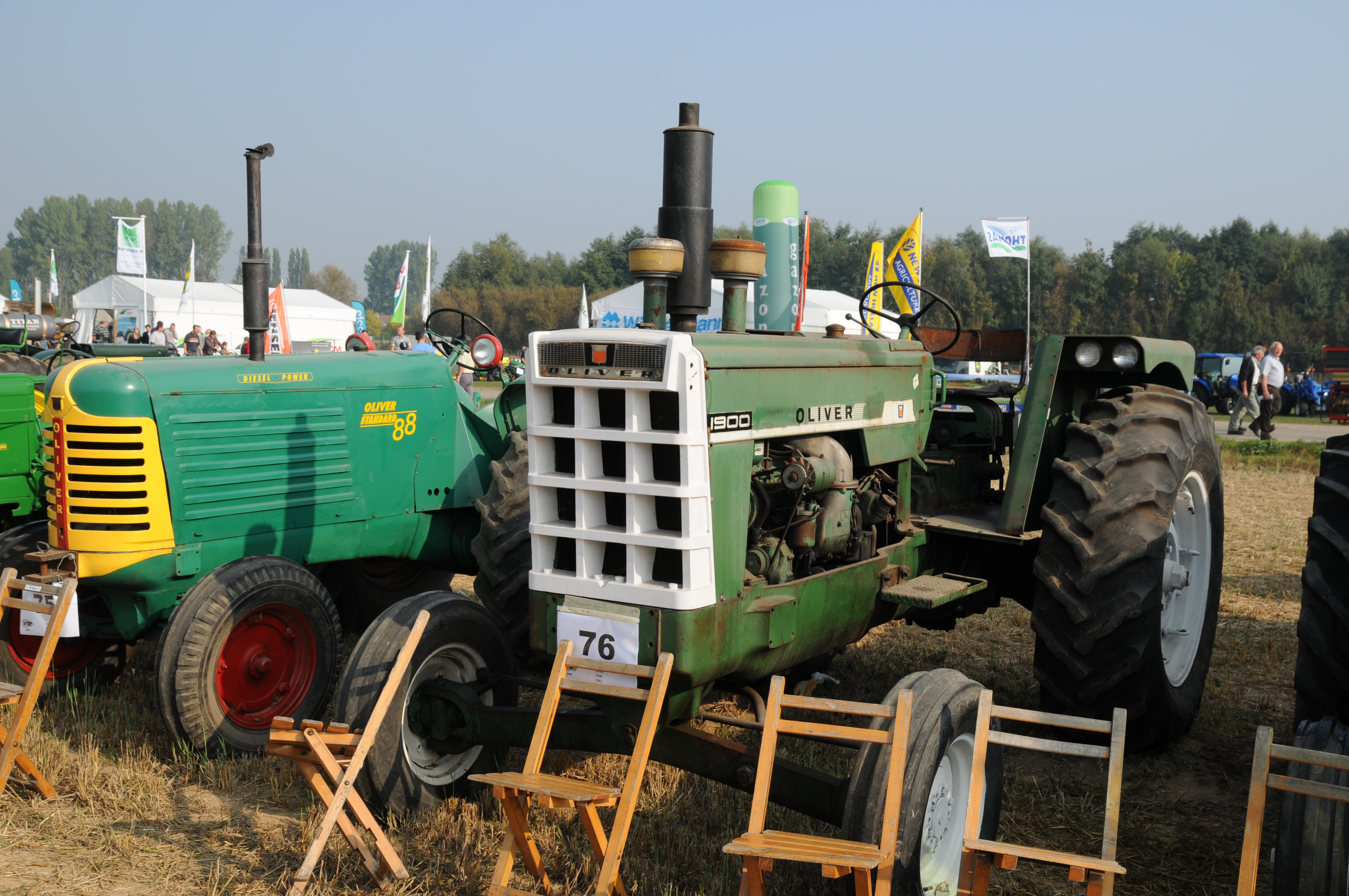
- Oliver 1900 next to an Oliver 88
- Type: Utility tractor
- Manufacturer: Oliver Farm Equipment Company
- Production: 1960-1964
- Weight: 12,000 pounds (5,400 kg)
- Propulsion: Rear wheels
- Engine model: General Motors supercharged 3.5L 4-cylinder diesel
- Gross power: 99 horsepower (74 kW)
- PTO power: 89.35 horsepower (66.63 kW)
- Drawbar power: 82.85 horsepower (61.78 kW)
- Drawbar pull: 12,475 pounds (5,659 kg)
- NTTL test: 768

The Oliver 1900 row-crop tractor was built between 1960 and 1964 by the Oliver Farm Equipment Company. The 1900 was a heavy, powerful tractor, built in three series.

== Description and production ==
The Oliver 1900 was a standard-type tractor, with wide-set front wheels. It was powered by naturally aspirated two stroke General Motors 4-53a 212.4-cubic-inch (3,481 cc) displacement four-cylinder diesel engine. The initial A series was built in 1960-61. It was succeeded in 1962 by the B series, with increased power, a swap from a 2 valve per cylinder head in the engine to 4 valves per cylinder and an option for four-wheel drive. The C series improved the operator's station and incorporated hydraulic power steering. Early tractors used only a six-speed transmission, with a shaft directly from the engine to the transmission. Later, a shift on the go unit bolted directly to the rear of the engine, known as the “hydra-power drive” was offered, along with the standard 6 speed. The tractor was marketed in Wheatland, Row-Crop and Rice Tire versions. The 1964 price was about $9,000.
