= Power shuttle =

Additional unit used in transmissions

A power shuttle is an additional unit used in transmissions and is generally used in agricultural tractors. While a vehicle is moving forwards, the driver can pull a lever that makes it stop and reverse at the same speed. Power shuttles are known under various trade names, such as Power Reverser.

In forward/reverse position of the F-R lever, pressure is built in the system due to flow to the wet clutch. During, the pressure rise, F-R clutch is energized, which makes the vehicle move. Flow to the tank line is blocked during the flow to the clutch.

== Types ==
Power shuttle is incorporated in transmissions in three forms: counter-shaft, full planetary (power shifts), and continuously variable transmissions.

=== Counter shaft transmissions ===
In this case generally forward reverse synchronizers are replaced by the multi-plate friction clutches. Typically the multi-plate clutches are arranged on the main shaft or on the counter shaft. The forward reverse section of the gear box is generally located in the forward section as close to the engine as possible. This is beneficial to the forward reverse control elements as they are not subjected to the high relative torque. The challenge involved in providing this feature in the existing transmissions is the complex shaft arrangement. This problem arises due to the limitation of centre distance between the two shafts and fixed axial dimensions due to the vehicle size limitations.

=== Full planetary (power shift) ===
In this type of transmissions the planetary action is used for providing reverse or forward action to the gear box.

=== CVT/IVT ===
Here the automatic nature of the gear box takes care of the direction change by either engaging planetary sets or by engaging multi-plate clutches or by some other means. Features of power shuttle transmissions.

Power shuttle transmissions were invented for mining and earth moving applications. The needs in the areas were:

1. Quick shuttle response
2. Left hand shuttle lever (so that right hand is free for loader joystick)
3. Reducing driver fatigue.
