= Corn picker =

Agricultural machine

A corn picker is an agricultural machine used to harvest corn leaving the whole ear intact rather than shelling the kernels off like a conventional combine.

The first corn picker was produced in 1909. New Idea introduced the first commercially successful corn sheller and husker in 1928. Massey Harris began manufacturing self propelled corn pickers in 1946.

Corn pickers began suffering an extreme loss in sales after a corn head was developed for combines in 1956.
