= Distillate (motor fuel) =

Grade of fuel in North America, c. 1910s–1960s

Distillate fuel, also called tractor fuel, was a petroleum product that was commonly used to power North American agricultural tractors from the early and mid-20th century. The product was crudely refined, akin to kerosene chemically, but impure.

== Characteristics ==
North American distillate is broadly described as a fuel with heavier molecular weight than gasoline, and similar to or lighter than kerosene or No. 1 fuel oil. However, both usage of the term and formulation of the product varied widely. Octane ratings varied similarly, between 33 and 45.

== Usage ==
Early railroad motor cars and tractors were offered with kerosene or gasoline-powered engines. Beginning in 1925, distillate-powered versions were offered, persisting until 1956, when the last "all-fuel" tractors were sold, while diesel-fueled tractors increased in popularity. Kerosene-engined tractors were phased out by 1934. Distillate fuel was used in machines with specific provisions for distillate, as well as all-fuel tractors which could handle kerosene, gasoline or distillate. Tractors designed for distillate could operate on gasoline, and were usually started with gasoline, but since they operated at a much lower compression ratio than gasoline-engined models, they developed less power on gasoline, and had to be warmed up with the more easily-volatilized gasoline before they could switch to distillate. Compression ratios for distillate could be about 4.7:1, while gasoline engines would run at 7:1 or more. Such machines were provided with small gasoline tanks for starting and warming up. However, distillate was often substantially less expensive than gasoline in farming regions, either because it was a less-refined product or because it was taxed at a lower rate or untaxed. "Power fuel" was a higher grade product that was somewhat short of gasoline in effectiveness.

== Distillate fuel oil ==
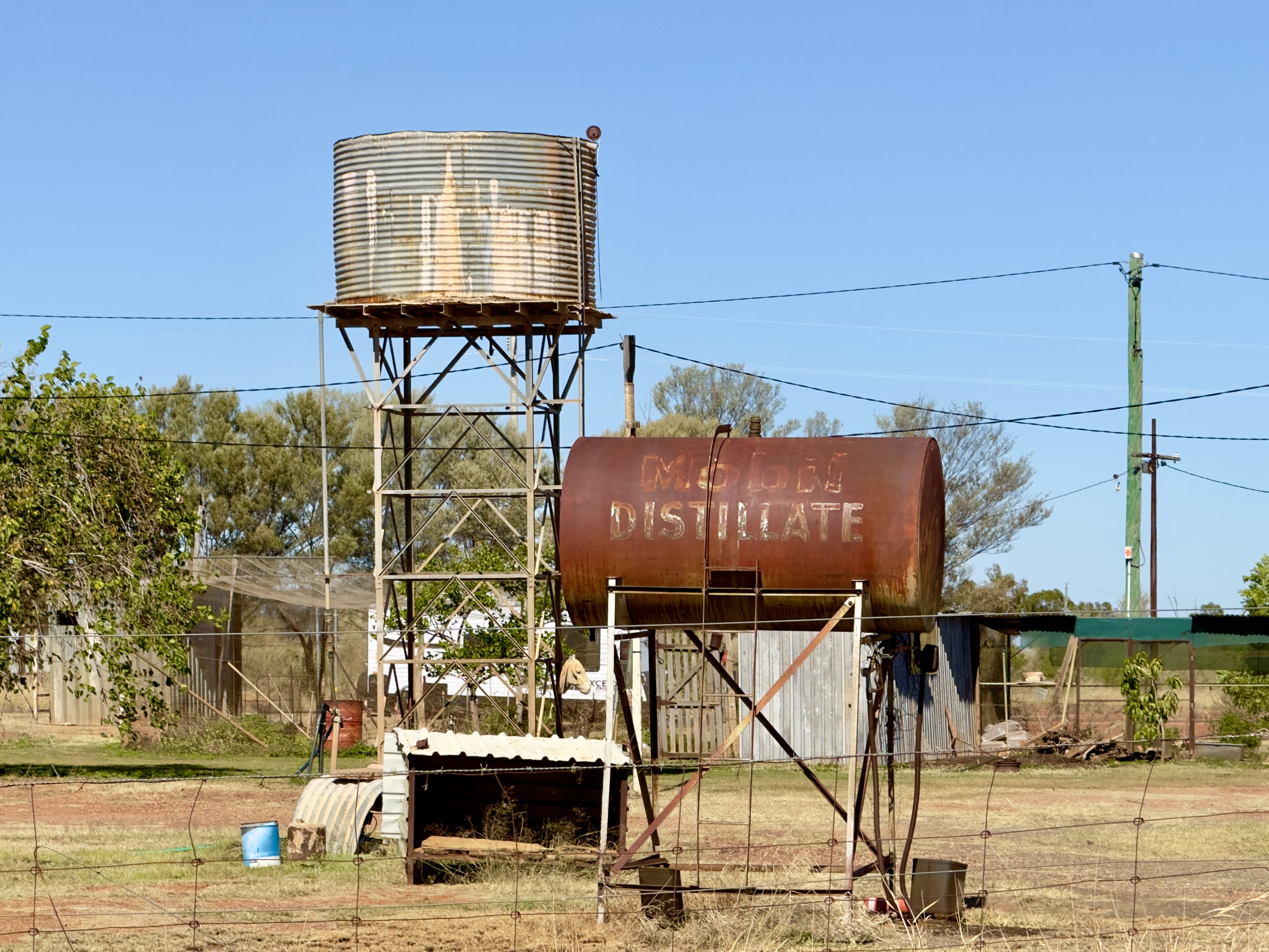
Distillate tank at Foxtrap Road House Cooladdi, Queensland, 2024

Distillate was withdrawn from the market as cheaper and higher-grade gasoline and diesel fuels reached the markets. In time, "distillate" came to describe lighter fractions of diesel and fuel oil, with "No. 1 distillate" and "No. 2 distillate" referring to the lighter fractions of both products, albeit with different characteristics between fuel oil and diesel fuel.

== See also ==
- Tractor vaporising oil, a similar, but higher-quality product used from the late 1930s until 1974 in the United Kingdom and Australia
