= Cockshutt 540 =

Utility tractor

- Type: Utility agricultural tractor
- Manufacturer: Cockshutt Plow Company
- Production: 1958-1962
- Propulsion: Rear wheels
- Engine model: Continental F162 2.7L 4-cylinder gasoline
- Gross power: 34 horsepower (25 kW)
- PTO power: 31 horsepower (23 kW) (belt)
- Drawbar power: 26 horsepower (19 kW)
- Preceded by: Cockshutt 20

The Cockshutt 540 utility tractor was built by the Cockshutt Plow Company, from 1958 to 1962. It was a utility successor to the Cockshutt 20 tractor, capable of operating two or three plows. Following industry trends, the 540 was styled with squared-off lines compared to the streamlined look of previous models.

== Description and production ==
The Cockshutt 540 was the only Cockshutt tractor to be marketed as a utility tractor. In accordance with industry trends of the early 1960s, the 540 was styled with squared-off lines by industrial designer Raymond Loewy. The 540 was powered by a Continental Motors Company 162-cubic-inch (2,650 cc) four-cylinder gasoline engine with a six-speed transmission, sharing the transmission with the larger 550. Although it was a utility tractor, the wheels could be adjusted in a manner similar to row-crop tractors, with power rear wheel adjust an option. A wide adjustable front axle was the only front wheel offering. The 540 came with a three-point hitch, power take-off (PTO) and hydraulics as standard equipment.

About 2,500 Cockshutt 540s were built at Cockshutt's Brantford, Ontario plant from 1958 to 1962. None were produced in 1960 due to excess inventory from previous years. Base price in 1958 was CA$2,667.
