= Cockshutt 20 =

Row crop tractor

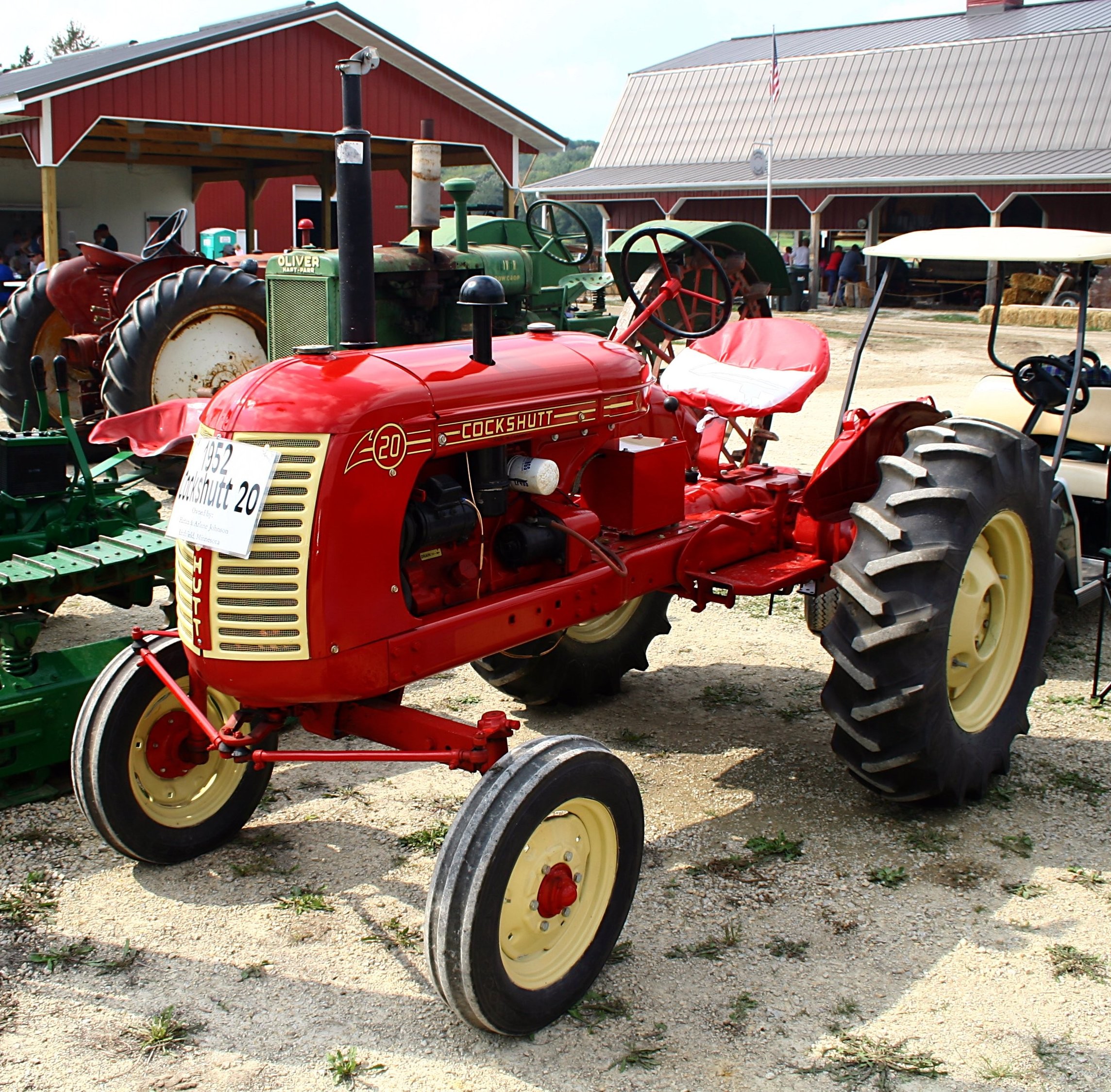
- Cockshutt 20
- Type: Row-crop agricultural tractor
- Manufacturer: Cockshutt Plow Company
- Production: 1952-1958
- Weight: 2,820 pounds (1,280 kg)
- Propulsion: Rear wheels
- Engine model: Continental 140 (main production)
- Gross power: 33 horsepower (25 kW)
- PTO power: 28.94 horsepower (21.58 kW) (belt)
- Drawbar power: 25.47 horsepower (18.99 kW)
- Drawbar pull: 3,266 pounds (1,481 kg)
- NTTL test: 474 (gasoline)
- Succeeded by: Cockshutt 540

The Cockshutt 20 row-crop tractor was the third tractor produced by the Cockshutt Plow Company, from 1951 to 1958. Having developed the medium-sized Cockshutt 30 and the heavier Cockshutt 40, the 20 was a small two-plow tractor for general use. The 20 was sold in the United States as the CO-OP E2.

== Description and production ==
The Cockshutt 20 was scaled down from the 30, with many of the same features, but lacking the live power takeoff (PTO) of larger Cockshutts. The tractor was styled in the same streamlined manner as the 30 by Canadian architect Charles Brooks. A Continental Motors Company 124-cubic-inch (2,030 cc) four-cylinder engine was initially used, but was replaced by a Continental 140-cubic-inch (2,300 cc) engine when early production models proved underpowered. A distillate version was offered in 1953.

Models were produced with narrow double front wheels, or a wide adjustable front row-crop axle. About 4,000 Cockshutt 20s and derivatives were built at Cockshutt's Brantford, Ontario plant from 1952 to 1958. Base price in 1956 was CA$1,656. A fully-optioned 20 could cost more than CA$2,600.

In 1956 the Model 20 Deluxe Black Hawk was offered with refinements and a mostly cream-colored paint scheme with red chassis. At the request of the United States distributor, a model with an offset engine, similar to the Farmall A or C tractors was offered, branded the Little Chief.

== CO-OP E2 ==
Painted all-orange, the CO-OP E2 was a Cockshutt 20 rebranded for sale in the United States.
