= Oliver 500 =

Utility tractor

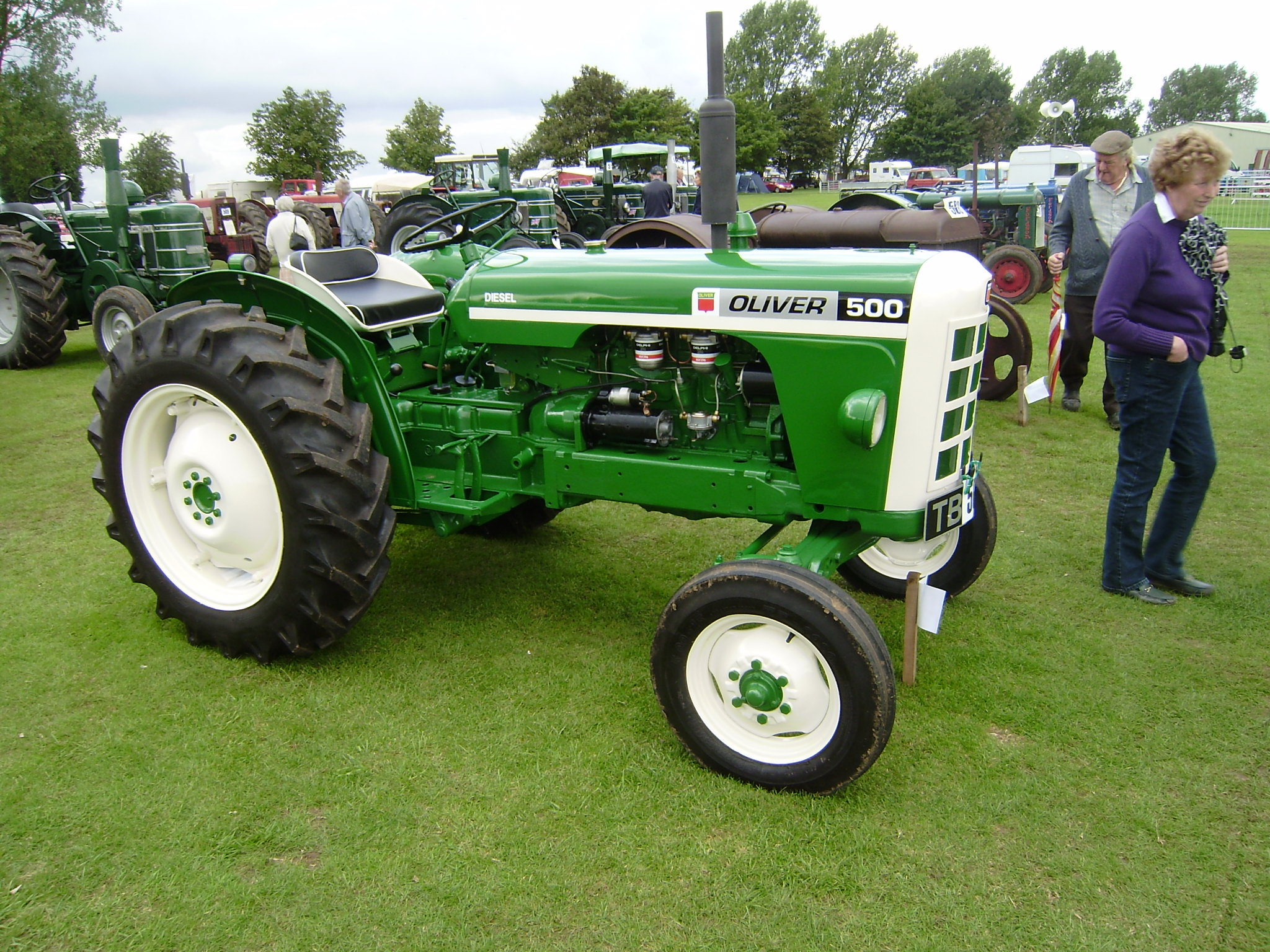
- An Oliver 500, a rebadged David Brown tractor
- Type: Utility tractor
- Manufacturer: David Brown for the Oliver Farm Equipment Company
- Production: 1954-1958
- Weight: 2,400 pounds (1,100 kg)
- Propulsion: Rear wheels
- Engine model: David Brown 2.5L four-cylinder
- Gross power: 35 horsepower (26 kW)
- PTO power: 28.24 horsepower (21.06 kW)
- Drawbar power: 30.92 horsepower (23.06 kW)
- Drawbar pull: 4,242 pounds (1,924 kg)
- NTTL test: 734 (David Brown 850 data)

The Oliver 500 utility tractor was built between 1961 and 1963 by David Brown Ltd. in England for the Oliver Farm Equipment Company, and marketed in North America by Oliver.

== Description and production ==
The Oliver 500 was a David Brown 850 tractor, restyled as an Oliver, and marketed to the same general market segment as the Oliver 550. The 500 used a David Brown engine with 154-cubic-inch (2,520 cc) displacement with a six-speed transmission, produced in gasoline and diesel versions. The 500 was sold between 1961 and 1963, at a price in 1963 of $2,670. 1,648 were built.
