= Cockshutt 570 =

Utility tractor

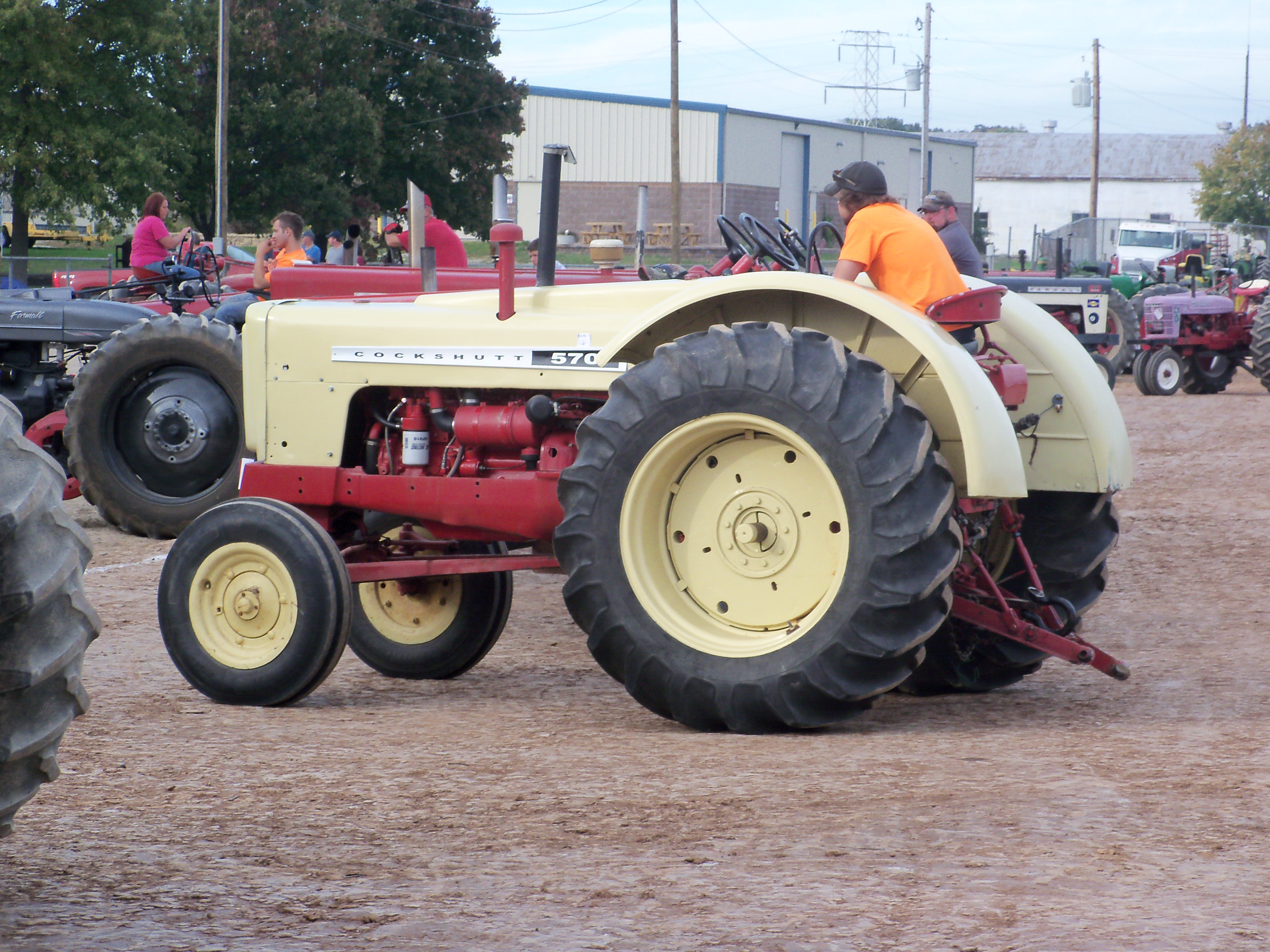
- Type: Row-crop agricultural tractor
- Manufacturer: Cockshutt Plow Company
- Production: 1958-1960
- Propulsion: Rear wheels
- Engine model: Hercules 4.9 6-cylinder diesel
- Gross power: 67 horsepower (50 kW)
- PTO power: 60.84 horsepower (45.37 kW) (belt)
- Drawbar power: 52.25 horsepower (38.96 kW)
- Drawbar pull: 9,063 pounds (4,111 kg)
- NTTL test: 683
- Preceded by: Cockshutt 50
- Succeeded by: Cockshutt 570 Super

The Cockshutt 570 row-crop tractor was built by the Cockshutt Plow Company, from 1958 to 1960. It succeeded the Cockshutt 50 heavy tractor in the Cockshutt product line, and was capable of pulling five plows. The new tractor was restyled in accordance with the trend toward squared-off lines, compared to earlier Cockshutt offerings.

== Description and production ==
The Cockshutt 570 succeeded the Cockshutt 50 as a heavy row-crop tractor. In accordance with industry trends of the early 1960s, the 570 was styled with squared-off lines by industrial designer Raymond Loewy. The 570 was powered by a Hercules Engine Company 269.5-cubic-inch (4,416 cc) six-cylinder diesel engine with a six-speed transmission. The 570 could be ordered with adjustable wide front wheels, narrow wheels and fixed wide front wheels.

3,100 Cockshutt 570s were built at Cockshutt's Brantford, Ontario plant from 1958 to 1961. Base price in 1958 was CA$3,670, and with options could exceed CA$4,500.

== 570 Super ==
The Cockshutt 570 Super was introduced in 1961 with a 339-cubic-inch (5,560 cc) Hercules diesel engine that substantially increased performance.

1,680 570 Supers were built at Brantford in 1961 and 1962. The 570 was the last Cockshutt-built tractor.

== 580 Super ==
Three prototypes of an even larger tractor, the 100-horsepower (75 kW) 580 were built in 1961, just before Cockshutt was taken over by the White Motor Company, using a 354-cubic-inch (5,800 cc) six-cylinder Perkins diesel. One example has been preserved and restored by Andy Appelfeller.
