= Cockshutt 560 =

Utility tractor

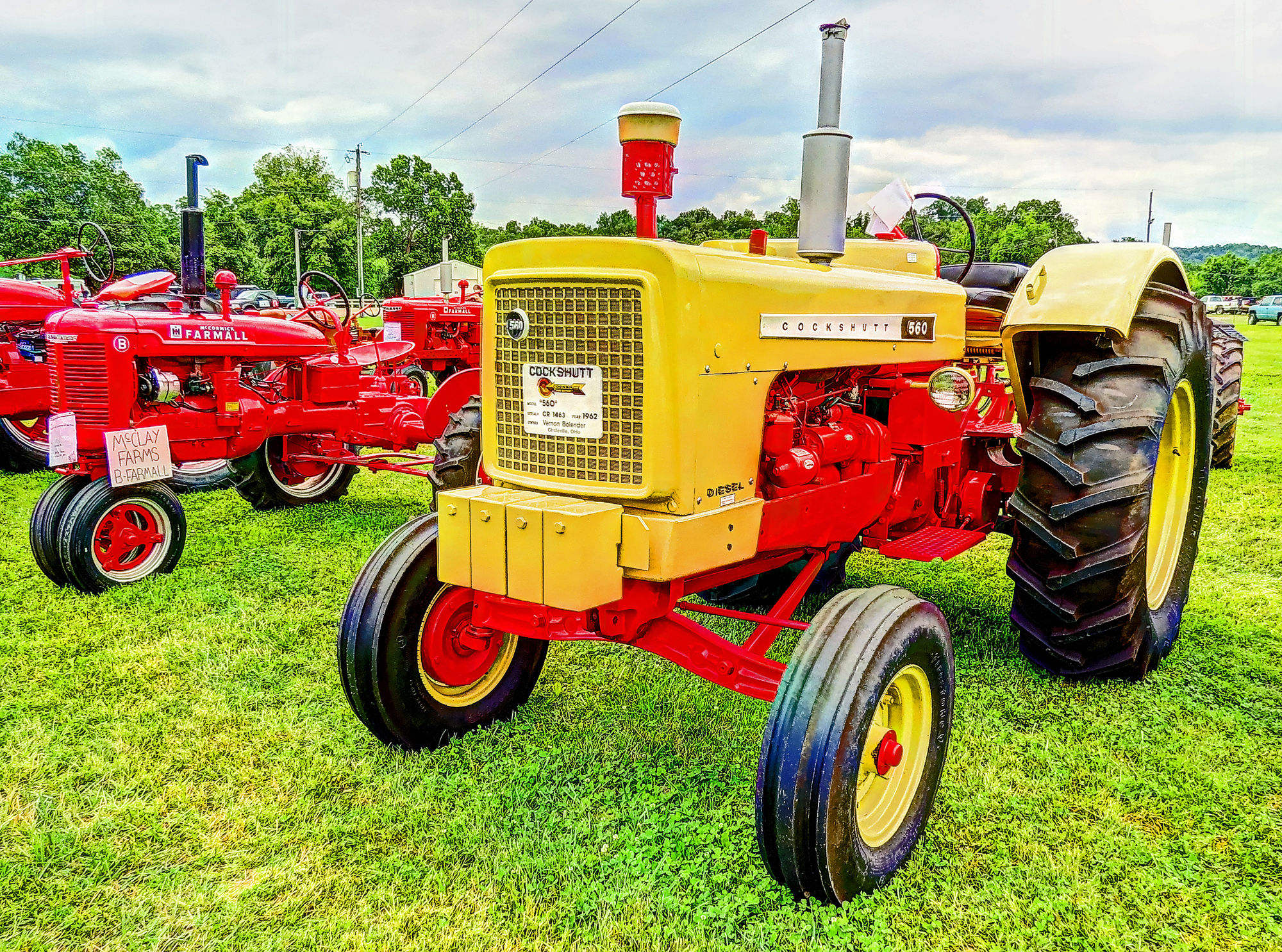
- Type: Row-crop agricultural tractor
- Manufacturer: Cockshutt Plow Company
- Production: 1958-1961
- Propulsion: Rear wheels
- Engine model: Perkins 4-270 4.4L 4-cylinder diesel
- Gross power: 54 horsepower (40 kW)
- PTO power: 48.52 horsepower (36.18 kW) (belt)
- Drawbar power: 45.61 horsepower (34.01 kW)
- Drawbar pull: 6,706 pounds (3,042 kg)
- NTTL test: 682
- Preceded by: Cockshutt 40D4

The Cockshutt 560 row-crop tractor was built by the Cockshutt Plow Company, from 1958 to 1961. It succeeded the Cockshutt 40D4 diesel in the Cockshutt product line, and was capable of pulling four plows. The new tractor was restyled in accordance with the trend toward squared-off lines, compared to earlier Cockshutt offerings.

== Description and production ==
The Cockshutt 560 succeeded the Cockshutt 35 Golden Arrow as a medium-sized row-crop tractor. In accordance with industry trends of the early 1960s, the 560 was styled with squared-off lines by industrial designer Raymond Loewy. The 560 was powered by a Perkins Engines 269.5-cubic-inch (4,416 cc) four-cylinder diesel engine with a six-speed transmission. The 560 could be ordered with adjustable wide front wheels, narrow wheels and fixed wide front wheels

2,910 Cockshutt 560s were built at Cockshutt's Brantford, Ontario plant from 1958 to 1961. Base price in 1958 was CA$3,812.
