= Cockshutt 50 =

Row crop tractor

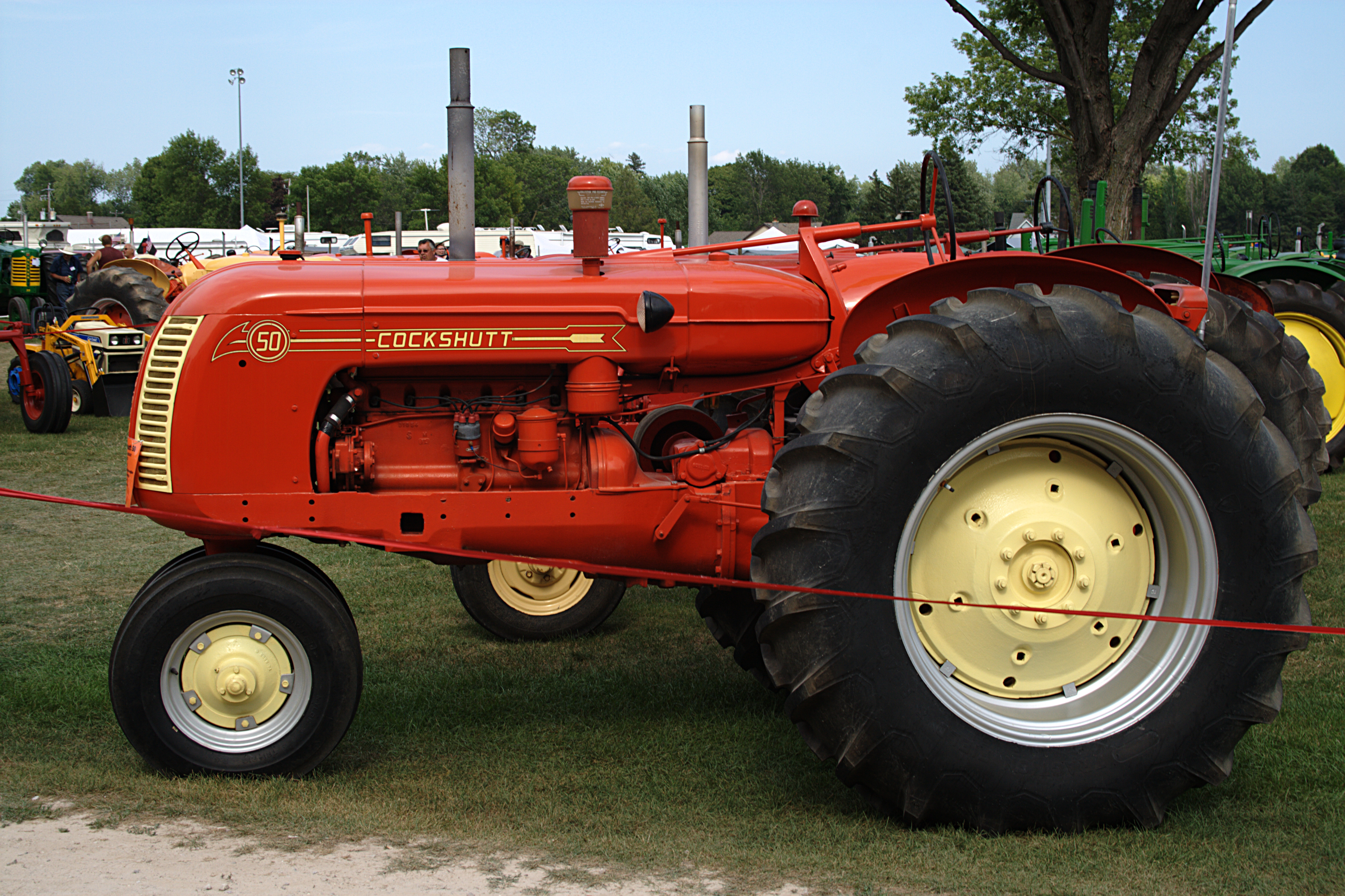
- Cockshutt 50
- Type: Row-crop agricultural tractor
- Manufacturer: Cockshutt Plow Company
- Production: 1953-1957
- Weight: 6,163 pounds (2,795 kg)
- Propulsion: Rear wheels
- Engine model: Buda 4.5L
- Gross power: 54 horsepower (40 kW)
- PTO power: 51.05 horsepower (38.07 kW) (belt)
- Drawbar power: 46.26 horsepower (34.50 kW)
- Drawbar pull: 6,319 pounds (2,866 kg)
- NTTL test: 487 (gasoline)
- Succeeded by: Cockshutt 570

The Cockshutt 50 row-crop tractor was a row-crop tractor produced by the Cockshutt Plow Company, from 1953 to 1957. It was the largest of a series of Canadian-produced tractors that started with the Cockshutt 30, and was based on the Cockshutt 40 with a more powerful engine. The 50 was a large four or five-plow tractor for general use. The 50 was sold in the United States as the CO-OP E5.

== Description and production ==
The Cockshutt 50 was essentially a heavier Cockshutt 40 with a more powerful engine. The tractor was styled in the same streamlined manner as the original 30 by Canadian architect Charles Brooks. A Buda Engine Company 273-cubic-inch (4,470 cc) six-cylinder gasoline engine was initially used with a diesel engine option soon after.

The tractor was brought to market in 1953, rated for four or five plows. In addition to its optional live PTO, it could also operate belt-connected apparatus. Models were produced with narrow double or single front wheels, a wide standard fixed front axle and an adjustable wide row-crop front axle, and front wheel units were interchangeable with the 40 and the later 35. 3,974 Cockshutt 50s and derivatives were built at Cockshutt's Brantford, Ontario plant from 1953 to 1957. Base price in 1956 was CA$2,872. A fully-optioned 50 could cost up to CA$4,000.

Comparable tractors to the Model 50 included the Case LA, Oliver 99, John Deere Model R, Minneapolis-Moline G and the Allis-Chalmers W.

== CO-OP E5 ==
Painted all-orange, the CO-OP E5 was a Cockshutt 50 rebranded for sale in the United States.
