= Cockshutt 550 =

Utility tractor

- Type: Row-crop agricultural tractor
- Manufacturer: Cockshutt Plow Company
- Production: 1958-1961
- Propulsion: Rear wheels
- Engine model: Hercules 3.2L 4-cylinder gasoline
- Gross power: 42 horsepower (31 kW)
- PTO power: 38.45 horsepower (28.67 kW) (belt)
- Drawbar power: 34.97 horsepower (26.08 kW)
- Drawbar pull: 6,544 pounds (2,968 kg)
- NTTL test: 698
- Preceded by: Cockshutt 35
- Succeeded by: Oliver 550 (rebranded as Cockshutt)

The Cockshutt 550 row-crop tractor was built by the Cockshutt Plow Company, from 1958 to 1961. It succeeded the Cockshutt 35 Golden Arrow in the Cockshutt product line, and was capable of pulling two or three plows. The new tractor was restyled in accordance with the trend toward squared-off lines, compared to earlier Cockshutt offerings. Confusingly, the 550 was replaced in 1962 by a different Oliver-built tractor, also branded as the Cockshutt 550.

== Description and production ==
The Cockshutt 550 succeeded the Cockshutt 35 Golden Arrow as a medium-sized row-crop tractor. In accordance with industry trends of the early 1960s, the 550 was styled with squared-off lines by industrial designer Raymond Loewy. The 550 was powered by a Hercules Engine Company 198-cubic-inch (3,240 cc) four-cylinder gasoline engine with a six-speed transmission. A Hercules diesel engine was optional. The three-point hitch incorporated hydraulic depth and draft control that had been introduced in the Golden Arrow demonstrators. The 550 could be ordered with adjustable wide front wheels, narrow wheels and fixed wide front wheels

2,930 Cockshutt 550s were built at Cockshutt's Brantford, Ontario plant from 1958 to 1961. Base price in 1958 was CA$2,819.

From 1962 the Brantford-built 550 was replaced by a rebranded Oliver 550 as part of the White Motor Company takeover of both Cockshutt and Oliver.
