= Oliver Super 44 =

Utility tractor

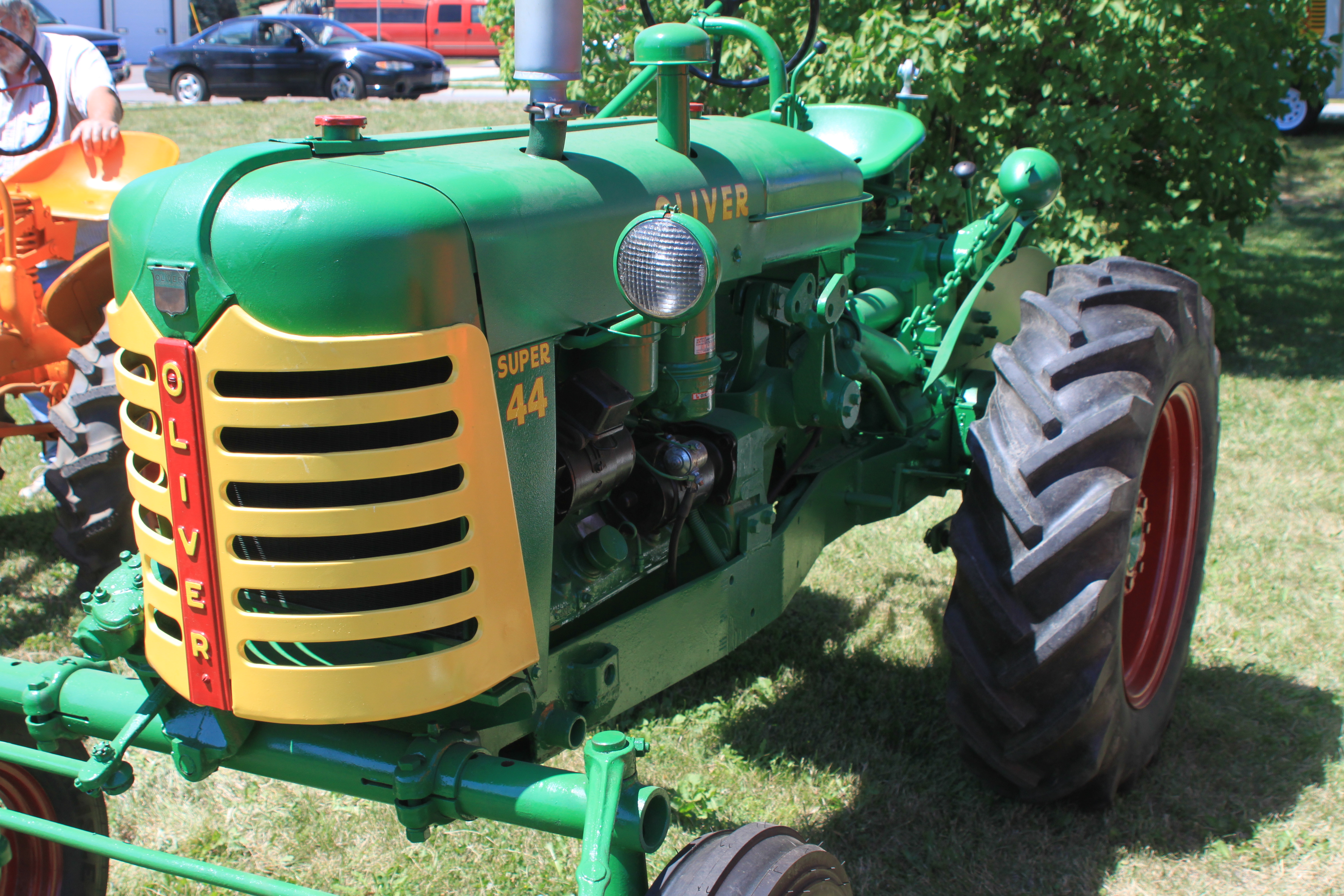
- Oliver Super 44
- Type: Utility tractor
- Manufacturer: Oliver Farm Equipment Company
- Production: 1954-1958
- Weight: 2,400 pounds (1,100 kg)
- Propulsion: Rear wheels
- Engine model: Continental 2.3L four-cylinder
- Gross power: 31 horsepower (23 kW)
- PTO power: 28 horsepower (21 kW) (belt)
- Drawbar power: 25 horsepower (19 kW)
- Succeeded by: Oliver 440

The Oliver Super 44 series of utility tractors was developed and produced from 1957 to 1975 by the Oliver Farm Equipment Company to complement the Oliver line of heavy row-crop and standard agricultural tracts. Like row-crop tractors, the wheel track width could be adjusted to conform to crop row spacing, but the front wheels were only offered with a wide track. No narrow front wheel options were offered, making the tractor more stable with front-end loaders. Both the Super 44 and 440 were rated for two plows.

== Description and production ==
The Oliver Super 44 and the heavier Super 55 were intended to compete against light tractor offerings from Farmall, Ford and John Deere]. They were built in an Oliver plant in Battle Creek, Michigan. The Super 44 was introduced in 1957, selling for about $2,200 in 1958. The 140-cubic-inch (2,300-cubic-centimetre) four-cylinder gasoline engine powered a four-speed transmission. Similarly to the Farmall C, the seat and steering wheel were offset to the right, increasing visibility. 775 Super 44s were produced, selling for about $2,200 in 1958.

== Oliver 440 ==
The Oliver 440 was produced with updated styling and few other changes, with production moving to the main Oliver plant in Charles City, Iowa. Production ran until 1975 under White ownership. Selling price in 1963 was about $2,800.
