= Cockshutt 40 =

Row crop tractor

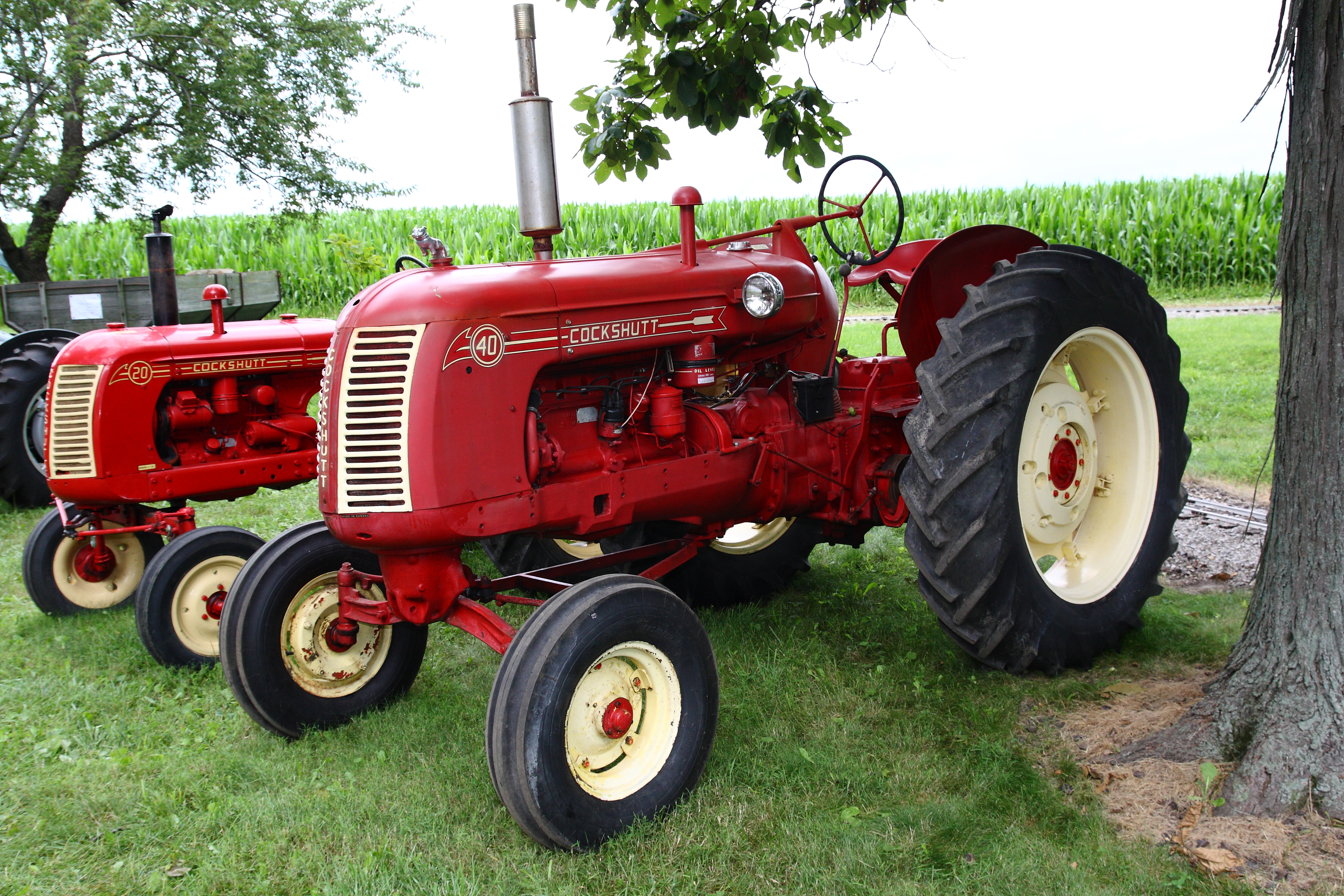
- A Cockshutt 40 with a Cockshutt 20 behind
- Type: Row-crop agricultural tractor
- Manufacturer: Cockshutt Plow Company
- Production: 1949-1958
- Length: 132 inches (340 cm)
- Height: 62.5 inches (159 cm) to hood
- Weight: 5,305 pounds (2,406 kg)
- Propulsion: Rear wheels
- Engine model: Buda 3.8L 4-cylinder
- Gross power: 47 horsepower (35 kW)
- PTO power: 43.3 horsepower (32.3 kW) (belt)
- Drawbar power: 37.855 horsepower (28.228 kW)
- Drawbar pull: 5,538 pounds (2,512 kg)
- NTTL test: 442 (gasoline)
- Succeeded by: Cockshutt 35 and Cockshutt 560 diesel

The Cockshutt 40 row-crop tractor was the second tractor produced by the Cockshutt Plow Company, from 1949 to 1958. Having developed the medium-sized Cockshutt 30, Cockshutt developed the heavier 40, using a six-cylinder engine. The 40 was rated for four plows. It was sold in the United States as the CO-OP E4.

== Description and production ==
The Cockshutt 40 was scaled up from the 30, with many of the same features, including a live power takeoff (PTO), which at that time was a novelty. This optional feature allowed the tractor to operate machinery at a constant speed whether the tractor was in motion or stationary. The tractor was styled in the same streamlined manner as the 30 by Canadian architect Charles Brooks. A 230-cubic-inch (3,800 cc) six-cylinder engine was provided by the American Buda Engine Company for the 40, supplemented by a diesel version in 1950. Kerosene and LP gas options were added to the product line in 1953.

Following the acquisition of Buda by competitor Allis-Chalmers in 1953, Cockshutt used Perkins and Hercules engines. 40s with Perkins four-cylinder diesels were designated the Cockshutt 40D4 from 1954 to 1957, and the Golden Eagle in 1956 and 1957. The 40D4 eventually became the basis for the Cockshutt 560.

In addition to its optional live PTO, the 40 could also operate belt-connected apparatus. Models were produced with narrow double or single front wheels, a wide standard fixed axle and an adjustable wide row-crop axle. 14,929 Cockshutt 40s and derivatives were built at Cockshutt's Brantford, Ontario plant from 1949 to 1958. Base price in 1955 was CA$2,626. A fully-optioned 40 could cost more than CA$3,600.

== Derivatives ==
Painted all-orange, the CO-OP E4 was a Cockshutt 40 rebranded for sale in the United States. The 40 was also sold through the Gambles department store chain, but unlike the 30, was never branded in the Gambles Farmcrest line.

The Cockshutt 50 was developed using Model 40 transmission components and running gear, but was substantially heavier and more powerful.

== Cockshutt 35 ==
Cockshutt 35
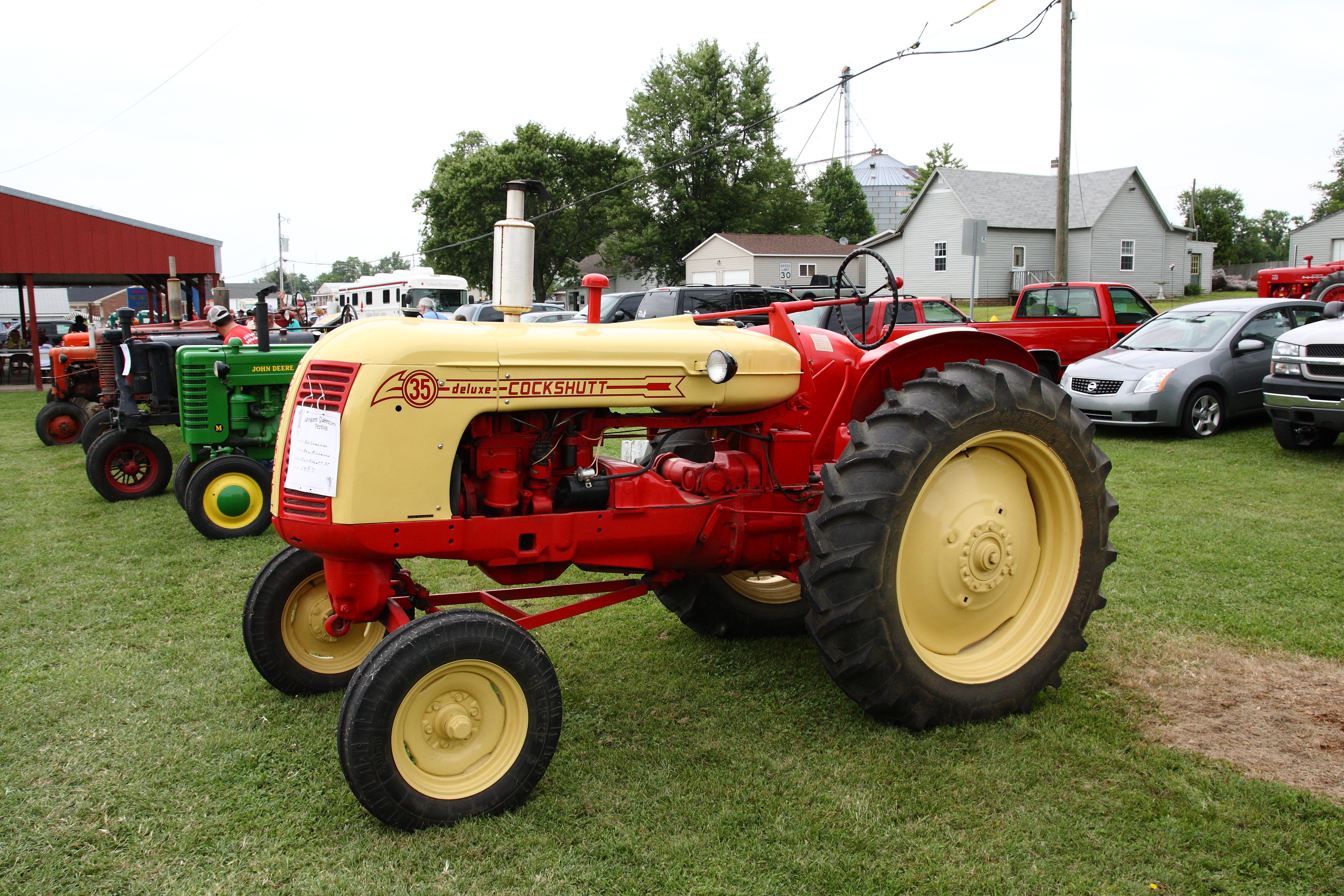
- Cockshutt 35
- Type: Row-crop agricultural tractor
- Manufacturer: Cockshutt Plow Company
- Production: 1955-1958
- Propulsion: Rear wheels
- Engine model: Hercules 3.2L 4-cylinder
- Gross power: 47 horsepower (35 kW)
- PTO power: 47.25 horsepower (35.23 kW) (belt)
- Preceded by: Cockshutt 40
- Succeeded by: Cockshutt 550

The Cockshutt 35 was developed to replace accommodate a four-cylinder Hercules Engine Company engine to replace the 40's Buda engines. Buda had been acquired by competitor Allis-Chalmers, and Cockshutt sought an independent supplier. The new tractor used the basic Model 40 frame, with a four-cylinder 198-cubic-inch (3,240 cc) Hercules GO198 gasoline engine, with a 6-speed transmission. The 35L version was a low-profile standard tractor with fixed axle width.

The 1956 Black Hawk version was marketed in the United States to promote Cockshutt's acquisition of the Black Hawk line of Ohio Cultivator Company tillage accessories, with no functional changes. Another promotional version, the Golden Arrow, was produced in 1957 with an enhanced three-point hitch with draft and depth control. 135 were built. The Cockshutt 550 was a descendant of the Golden Arrow version.

1,985 Cockshutt 35s and derivatives were built at Brantford from 1955 to 1958. Base price in 1958 for a Deluxe 35 Blackhawk was CA$2,640. A fully-optioned model would cost about CA$3,000.
