= Fishtail (tool) =

Type of chisel with a flared blade

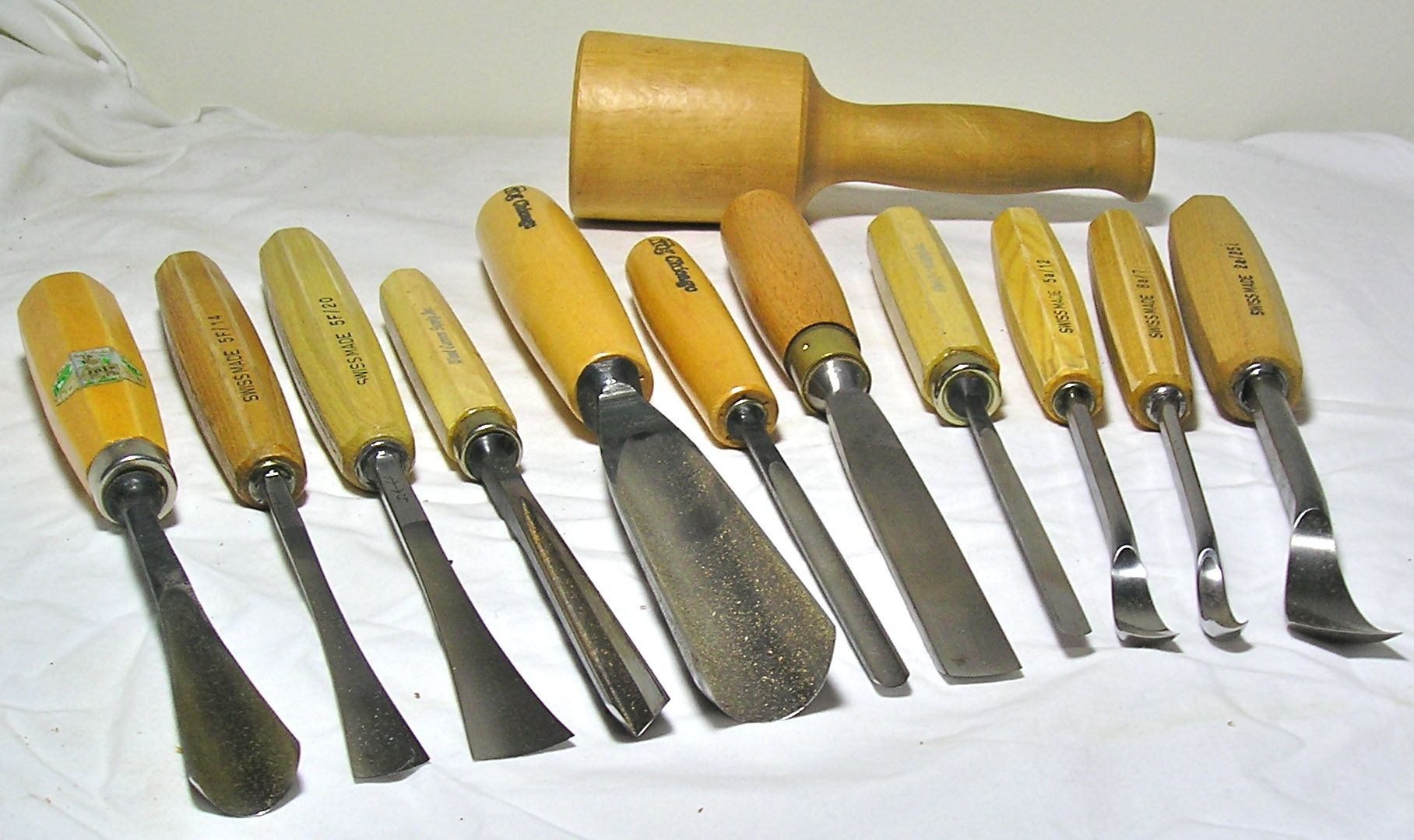
Three types of fishtail gouge on the left, compared with other gouge types

In woodworking, a fishtail (also fishtail gouge or fishtail spade gouge) is a type of chisel with a flared blade that resembles the tail of a fish.

They are used for light wood finishing, lettering, skimming, and modeling. They can be used to reach in tight places where a full-width gouge would not fit.

In gardening, a fishtail spade has a flared triangular blade combining the versatility of the Dutch hoe and power of the common round point shovel into a multipurpose tool.

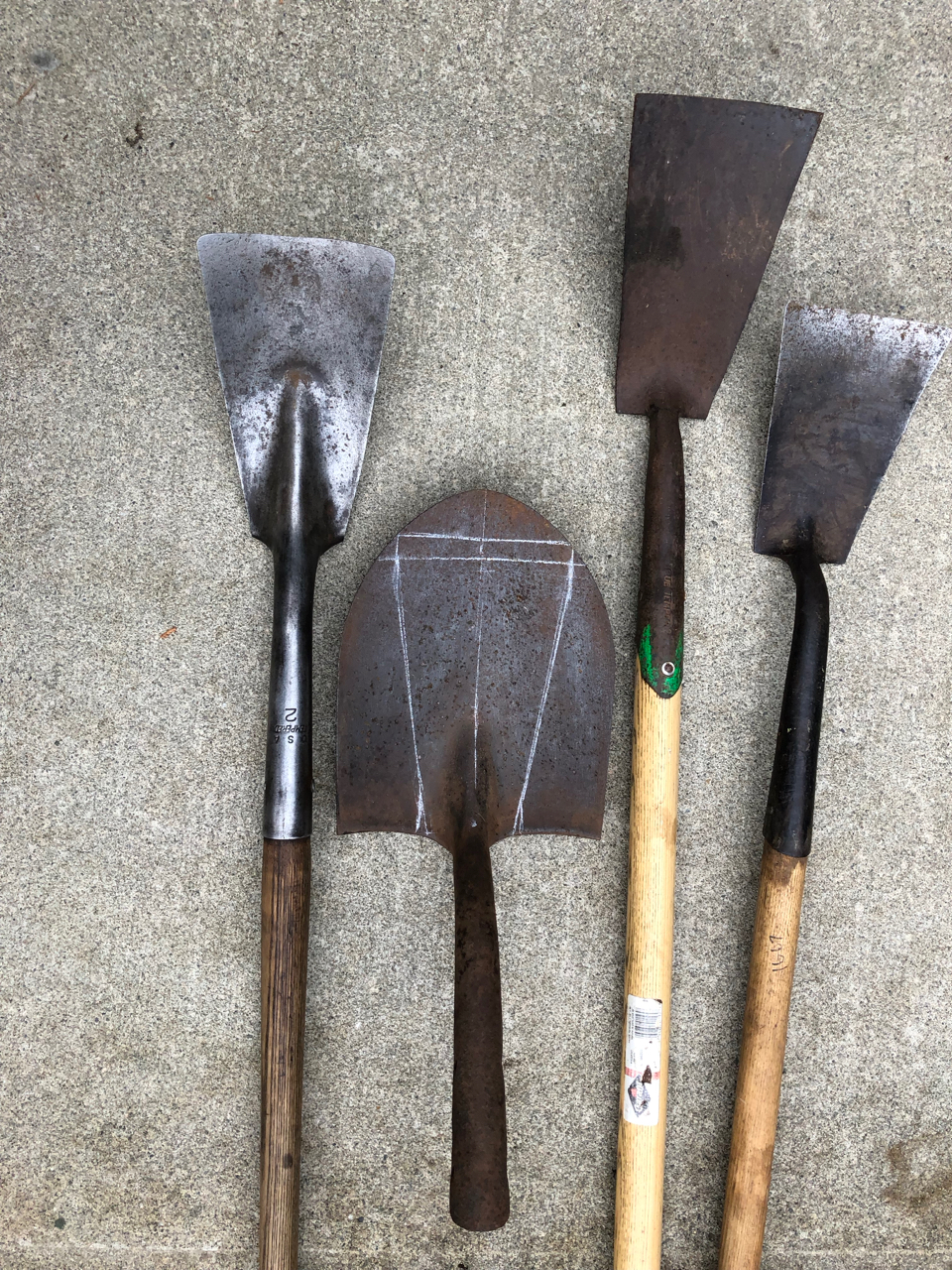
Three fishtail spades made from used pointed shovel heads. Blossom is on the left.
