= Oliver Super 55 =

Utility tractor

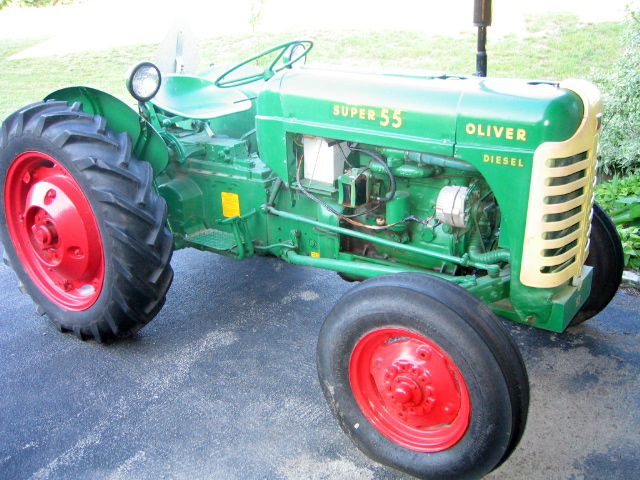
- 1956 Oliver Super 55 diesel
- Type: Utility tractor
- Manufacturer: Oliver Farm Equipment Company
- Production: 1954-1958
- Length: 3.04m
- Weight: 3,400 pounds (1,500 kg)
- Propulsion: Rear wheels
- Engine model: Oliver 2.4L
- Gross power: 36 horsepower (27 kW)
- PTO power: 34.39 horsepower (25.64 kW) (belt)
- Drawbar power: 29.6 horsepower (22.1 kW)
- Drawbar pull: 3,539 pounds (1,605 kg)
- NTTL test: 524
- Succeeded by: Oliver 550

The Oliver Super 55 series of utility tractors was developed and produced from 1954 to 1958 by the Oliver Farm Equipment Company to complement the Oliver line of heavy row-crop and standard agricultural tracts. Like row-crop tractors, the wheel track width could be adjusted to conform to crop row spacing, but the front wheels were only offered with a wide track. No narrow front wheel options were offered, making the tractor more stable with front-end loaders.

== Description and production ==
The Oliver Super 55 and the lighter Super 44 were intended to compete against light tractor offerings from Farmall, Ford and John Deere]. They were built in an Oliver plant in Battle Creek, Michigan. The Super 55 was introduced in 1953, selling for about $2,750 in 1958. Both gasoline and diesel versions used a 144-cubic-inch (2,360-cubic-centimetre) four-cylinder engine with a six-speed transmission.

== Oliver 550 ==
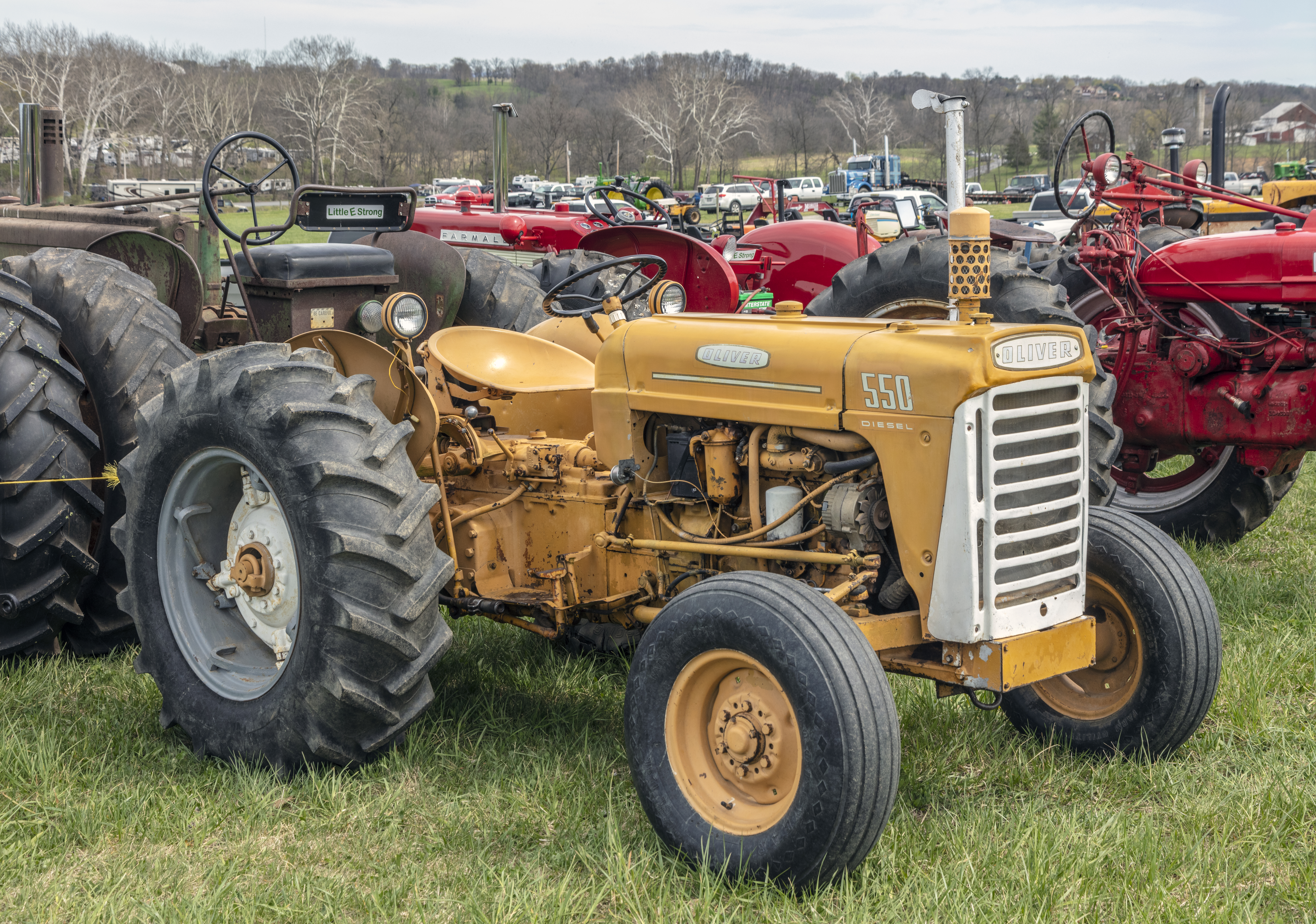
Oliver 550 industrial tractor

The Oliver 550 was introduced in 1958 with updated styling, replacing the Super 55. Engine displacement increased to 155-cubic-inch (2,540-cubic-centimetre), with a two-speed PTO, a new transmission, and a hydraulic three-point hitch. An option for power steering was offered, as well as power-assisted rear wheel spacing. Fixed wheel treads were an additional option. The 550 was sold in Canada as the Cockshutt 550, replacing the preceding Cockshutt-built 550, a completely different tractor. Production ran until 1975 under White ownership. The 550 sold for about $4,400 in 1975. 20,368 550s were produced with the Oliver brand, and 3,915 as Cockshutts. Oliver also produced an industrial tractor version of the 550 from 1958 to 1975.
