= Tree spade =

Machine for transplanting trees

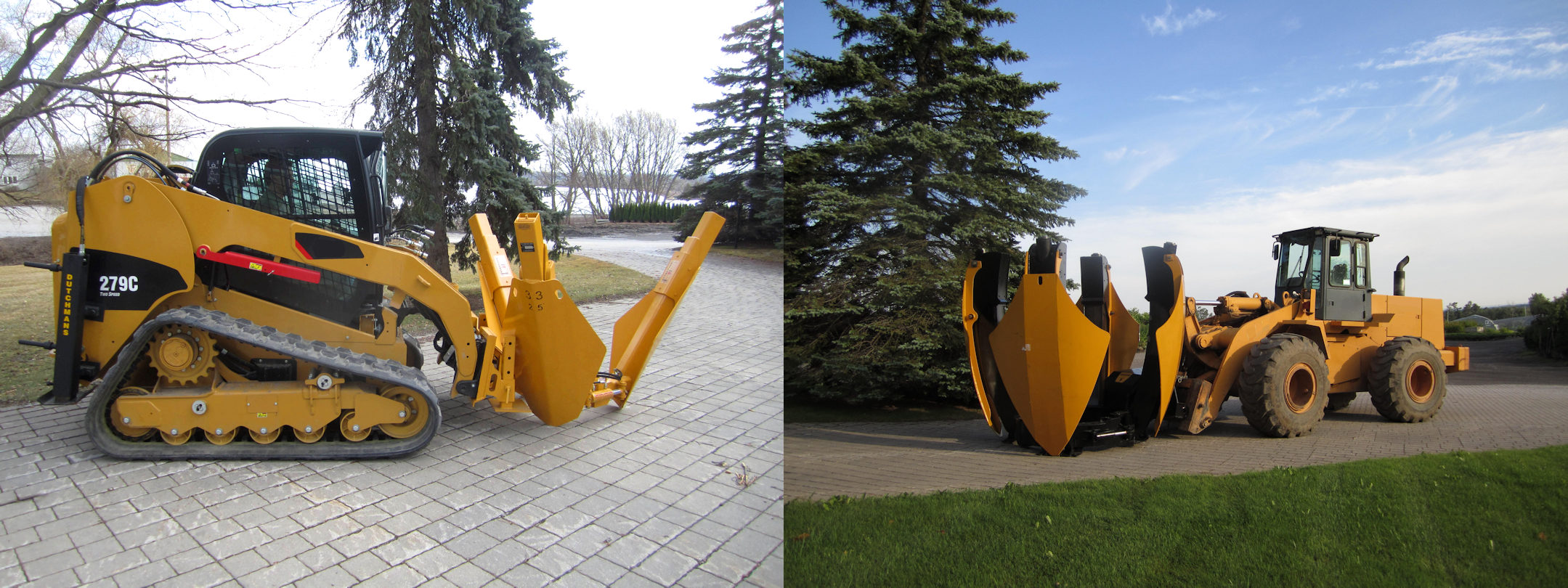
Two different types of tree spades on different types of loader vehicles

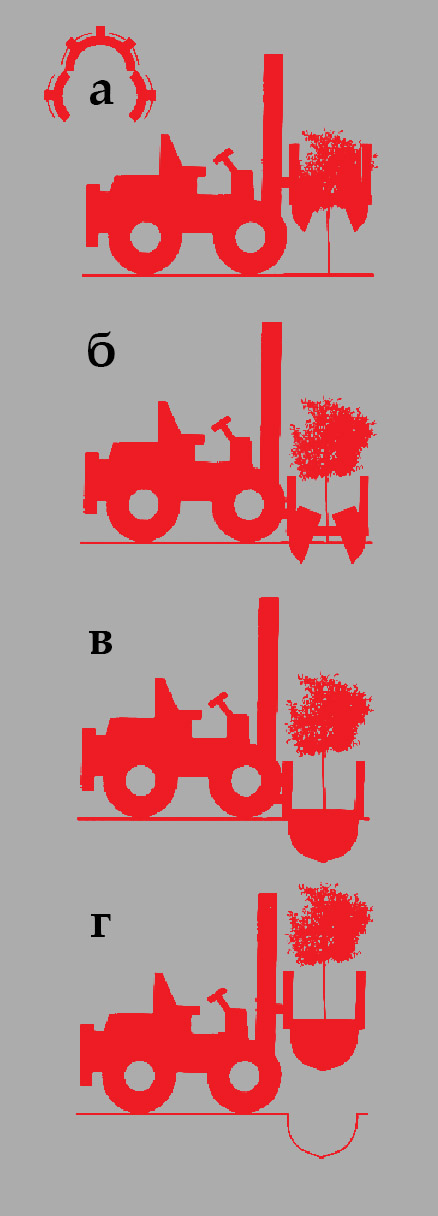
Steps in using a tree spade

A tree spade is a specialized machine that mechanizes the transplanting of large plants whose hand-powered transplanting (using traditional spades, wagons, and other equipment) would be prohibitively laborious. These include large bushes and small or medium trees. By bringing mechanized power to what was formerly only a manual process, tree spades do for transplanting what tractors and combine harvesters do for agriculture, and what excavators and other heavy equipment do for construction. Today, tree spades are widely used in the tree nursery industry to increase production rates, and in the landscaping industry for tree removal and transplanting.

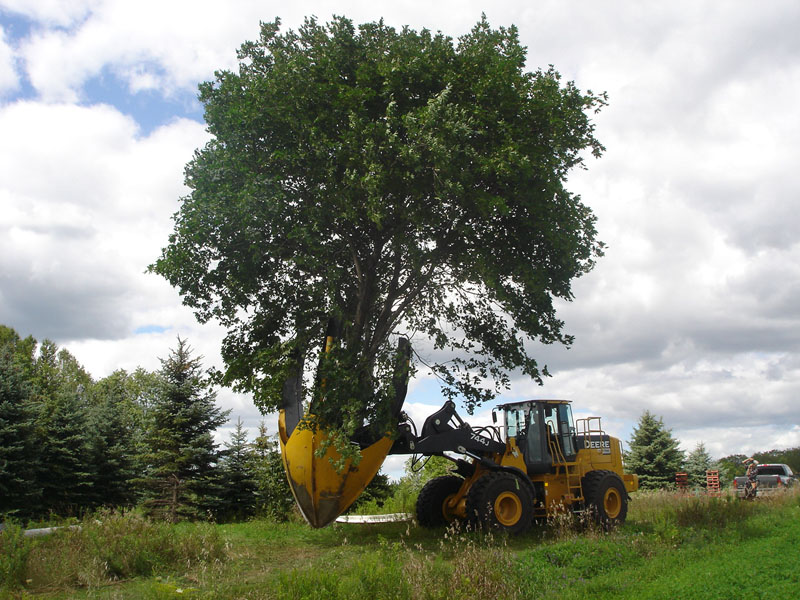
Moving a tree

A typical machine consists of a number of blades (generally 3 or 4, but single or dual blade designs also exist) that encircle the tree, digging into the ground and then lifting the entire tree, including its roots and soil (in what is termed a "root ball"), out of the ground and replanting or transplanting the whole tree in the designated area. Similar machines can also be used for placing trees in pots or baskets for commercial tree nursery operations. Tree spades are available in a wide variety of sizes and designs that are made to suit varied soil conditions and customer requirements. Typical design variations can include straight vs curved blades, root ball diameter, root ball depth, and root ball cone angle.

The machines can be mounted on a tractor or loader for moving trees a short distance, or on the back of a truck for relocating trees over the highway a long distance away. For tree nursery operations, tree spades are also sometimes mounted on excavators, though this is less common due to the weight capacity requirements of manipulating the machine along with an excavated tree. For transport on public roads, the spade tilts the tree to a near-horizontal position in order to clear overhead bridges and cables.

A 'tree moving machine' was patented by Howard E. Crawford, of Detroit (Redford Township) in 1961. The patent application was in February of 1958 and the patent was approved and published on July 4, 1961.

The first tree spade at Opitz was built in 1971. Special machinery in tree nursery did exist before including the treedigger variants which are still more common to transplant smaller trees.

== See also ==
- Transplanting
