= Cockshutt 30 =

Row crop tractor

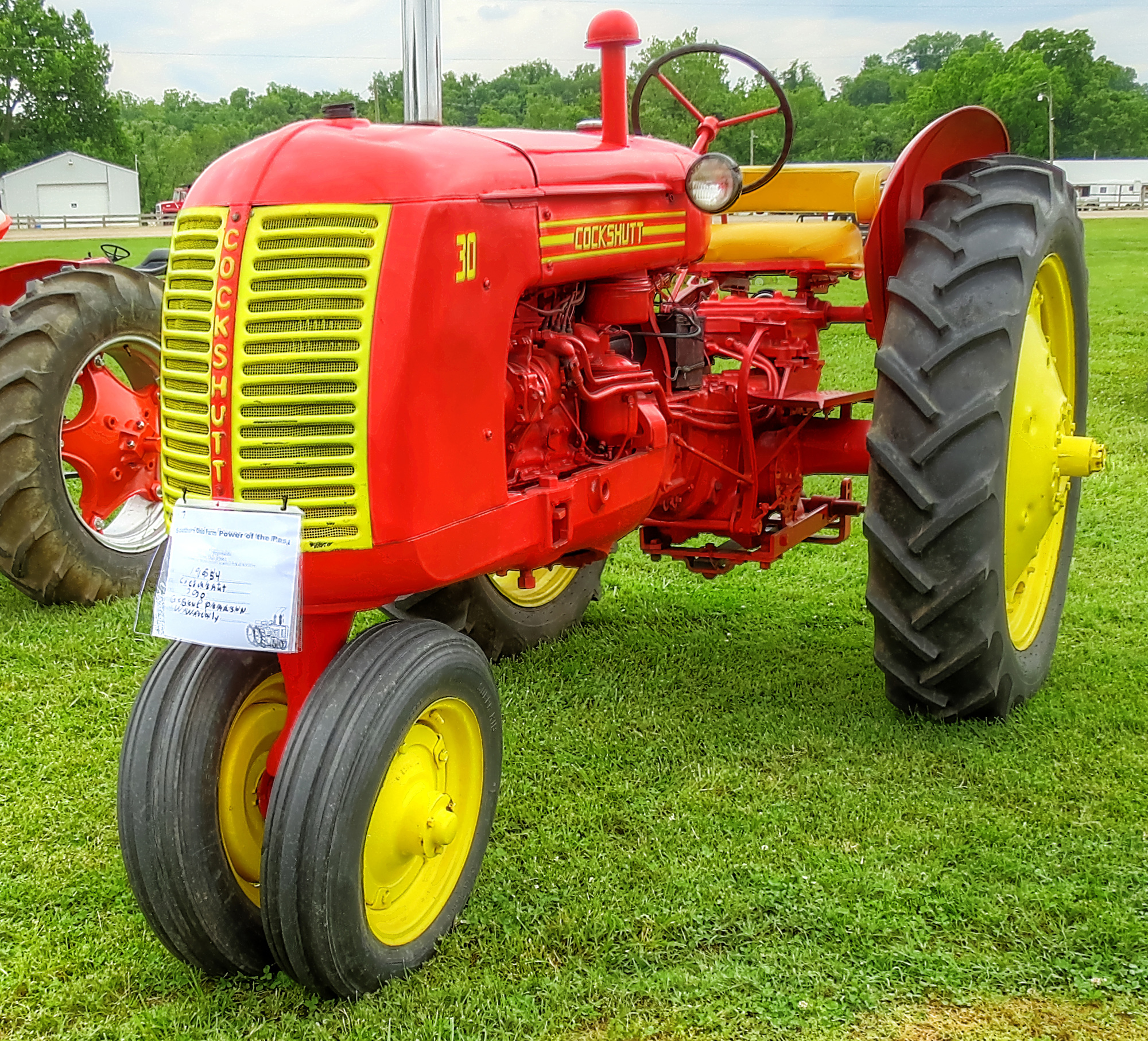
- 1954 Cockshutt 30
- Type: Row-crop agricultural tractor
- Manufacturer: Cockshutt Plow Company
- Production: 1946-1957
- Length: 127 inches (320 cm)
- Height: 59.25 inches (150.5 cm)
- Weight: 3,620 pounds (1,640 kg) (operating) 4,000 pounds (1,800 kg) (ballasted)
- Propulsion: Rear wheels
- Engine model: Buda 2.5L 4-cylinder
- Gross power: 31 horsepower (23 kW)
- PTO power: 30.38 horsepower (22.65 kW)
- Drawbar power: 27.25 horsepower (20.32 kW)
- Drawbar pull: 3,745 pounds (1,699 kg)
- NTTL test: 382 (gasoline)

The Cockshutt 30 row-crop tractor was the first production tractor to be manufactured in Canada. The Cockshutt Plow Company had previously imported rebranded Oliver and Allis-Chalmers tractors from the United States. The Model 30 marked Cockshutt's emergence as a full-line agricultural manufacturer. The tractors were built in Cockshutt's Brantford, Ontario plant. The Model 30 was noted for its introduction of a live power take-off (PTO), the first such accessory that could be operated whether the tractor was moving or stationary. Through the model's production span it was itself resold in the United States as the CO-OP E3 and the Gambles Farmcrest 30.

== Description and production ==
Starting in 1939, Cockshutt studied designs for a Cockshutt-built tractor, with effort accelerating as World War II and war-related production drew to a close. In particular, a need was identified for a "live" power take-off (PTO) drive; i.e. a PTO that provided full power whether the tractor was moving or not, operated by its own clutch. The Cockshutt 30 was the first product of this effort, and was the first Canadian-produced tractor. The live PTO was incorporated into the Cockshutt 30, and the "live" PTO terminology was itself originated by Cockshutt engineers. The tractor was styled in a similar streamlined manner to the early styled Oliver tractors by Canadian architect Charles Brooks. 153-cubic-inch (2,510 cc) four-cylinder engines were provided by the American Buda Engine Company. Diesel and LP gas options were added to the product line in later years.

The new tractor was brought to market in 1947, rated for two or three plows. In addition to its optional live PTO, it could also operate belt-connected apparatus. Models were produced with narrow double or single front wheels, a wide standard fixed front axle and an adjustable wide row-crop front axle. Row-crop wheel spacing could be varied in 2-inch (5.1 cm) increments from 56 inches (140 cm) to 84 inches (210 cm). 37,328 Cockshutt 30s and derivatives were built at Brantford from 1946 to 1957. Base price in 1955 was CA$2,022. A fully-optioned 30 could cost more than CA$3,000.

== Derivatives ==
Painted all-orange, the CO-OP E3 was a Cockshutt 30 rebranded for sale in the United States. The 30 was also sold with no significant modifications to the Cockshutt paint and styling as the Gambles Farmcrest 30, through the Gambles department store chain.

Comparable tractors to the Model 30 offered by competitors included the Farmall H, the Oliver 70, the John Deere Model A, and the Minneapolis-Moline ZTU.
