= Cockshutt Plow Company =

Canadian agricultural machinery manufacturer

- Formerly: Brantford Plow Works (1877–1882)
- Industry: Agricultural machinery
- Founded: 1877
- Defunct: 2 February 1962
- Fate: Acquired by the White Motor Company
- Successor: White Farm Equipment
- Headquarters: 66 Mohawk Street, Brantford, Ontario

Cockshutt was a large agricultural machinery manufacturer, known as Cockshutt Farm Equipment Limited (1957–1962), based in Brantford, Ontario, Canada.

Founded as the Brantford Plow Works by James G. Cockshutt in 1877, the name was changed to the Cockshutt Plow Company when it was incorporated in 1882. After James died shortly thereafter, his brother William Foster Cockshutt took over as president. He remained until 1888, when another brother, Frank Cockshutt, became president of the company. In 1910, Henry Cockshutt, the youngest of the brothers, took over the leadership of the company. Under his direction, the company was able to obtain financing for acquisitions and expansion.

== History ==
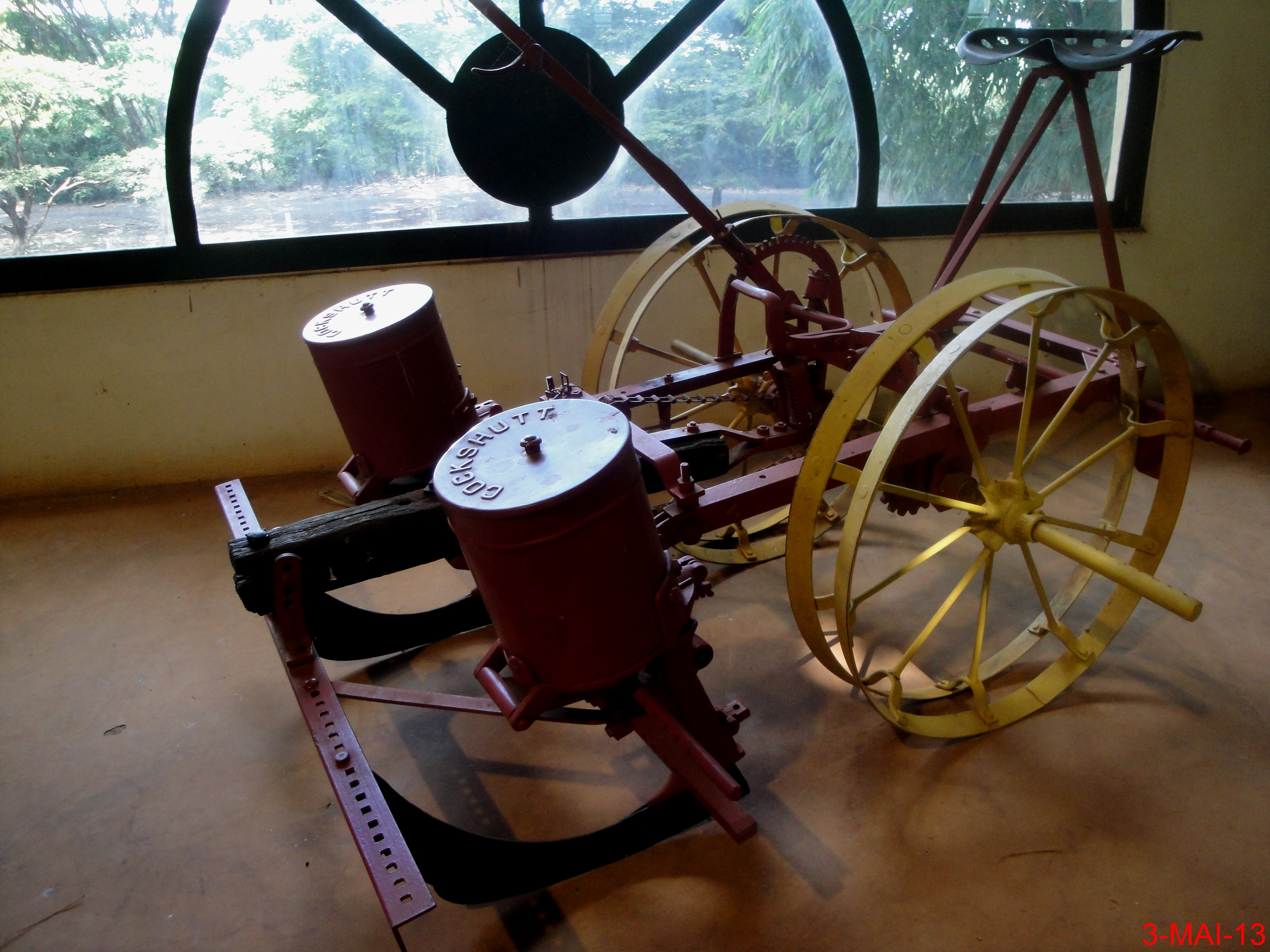
Cockshutt in Museu Agromen in Brazil

Known for quality designs, the company became the leader in the tillage tools sector by the 1920s.

Since Cockshutt did not have a tractor design of its own yet, in 1929 an arrangement was made to distribute Allis-Chalmers model 20-35 and United tractors (United was a group of Fordson dealers who contracted Allis for a new tractor, once Ford stopped North American production of the Fordson). In 1935 Cockshutt took on the Oliver tractor line.

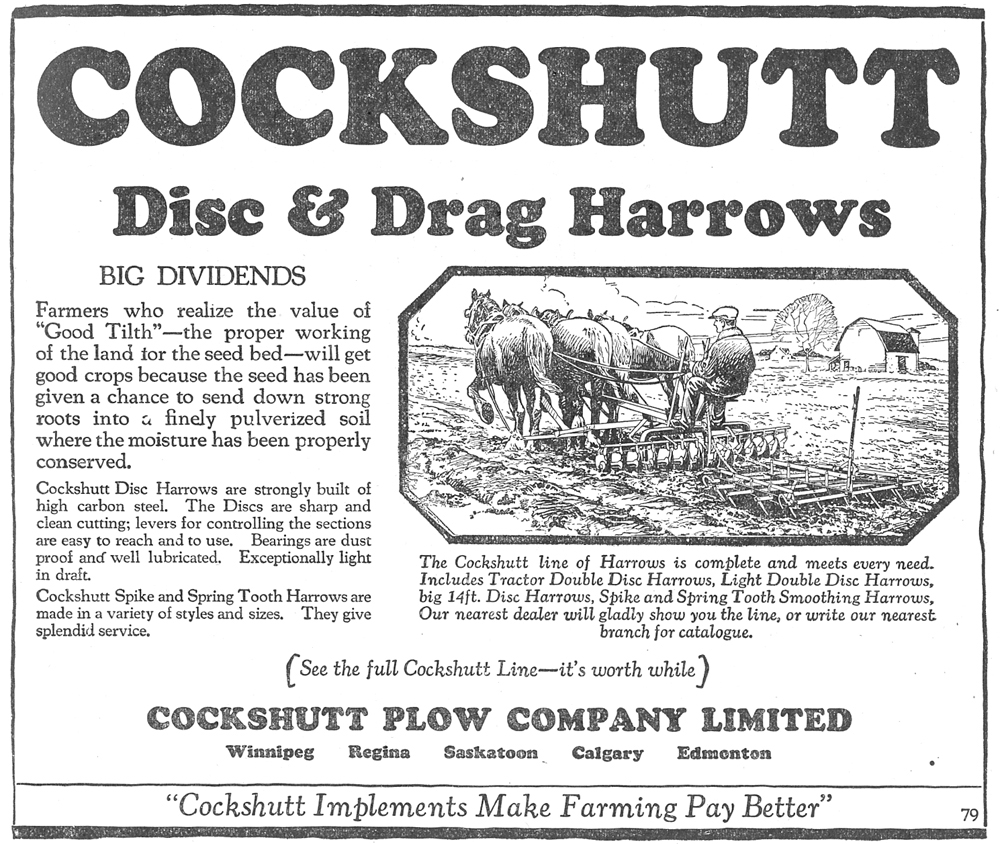
1927 ad for Cockshutt products

During World War II Cockshutt's Brantford, Ontario, factory, operating as Cockshutt Aircraft Division, manufactured undercarriages for several types of British bombers, including the Avro Lancaster Mk X being built by Victory Aircraft at Malton, and built plywood fuselages and wings for the Avro Anson training aircraft and for Britain's famous de Havilland Mosquito bomber. The Brantford plant, as Cockshutt Munitions Division also manufactured artillery trailers and artillery shells of variety of sizes. The work force at Brantford grew to nearly 6,000 people. A great number of the work force were women. Meanwhile, Cockshutt's other Brantford factory, called the Brantford Coach and Body plant, manufactured mechanical transport bodies, ambulances, and specialty trailers for the war effort.

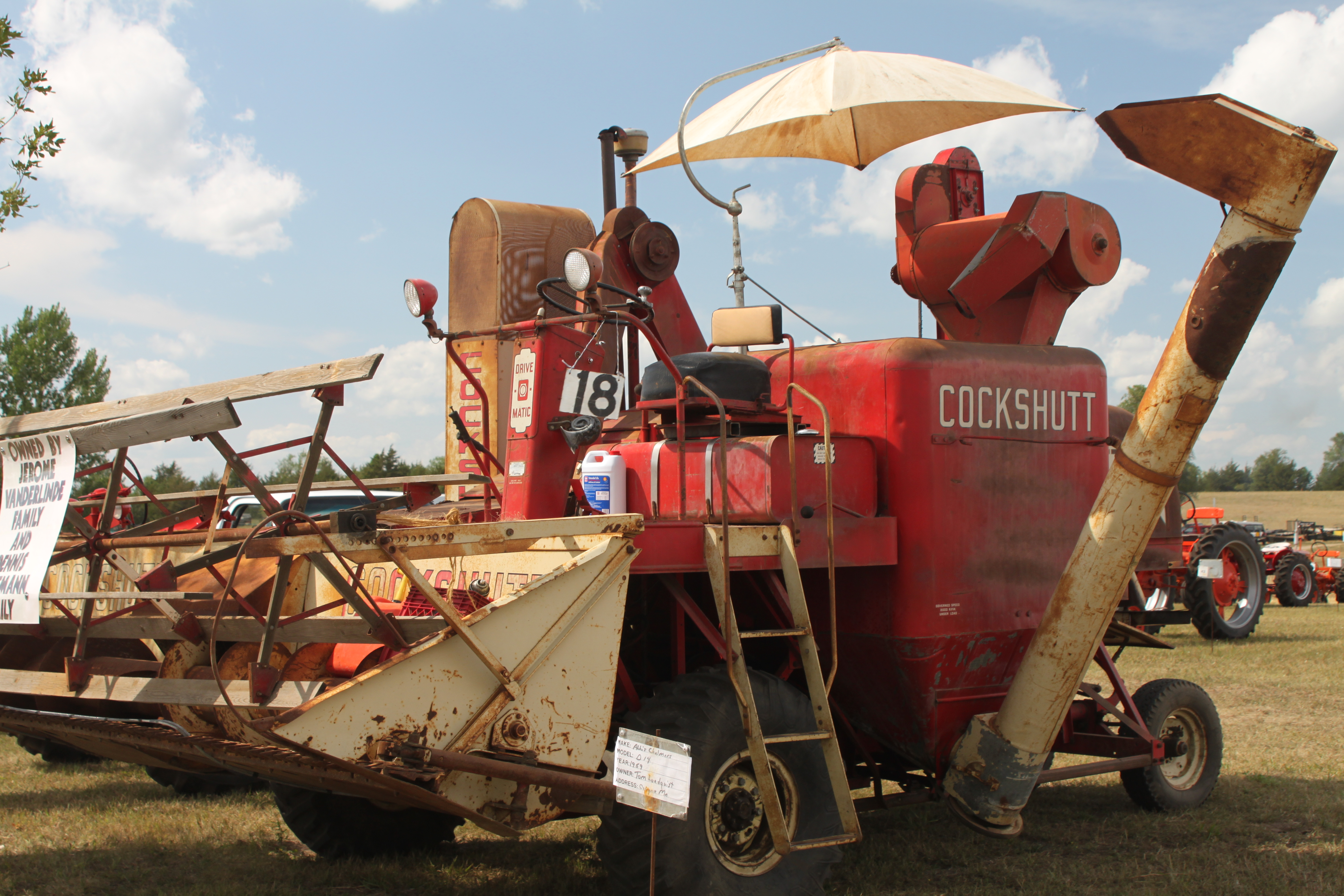
A Cockshutt combine harvester

Still during the war years Cockshutt was able to design its own tractor. This tractor was the Cockshutt 30 tractor. However, because the raw materials needed for industrial production were restricted only for use in the war effort, production of the Model 30 30-horsepower (22 kW) 2-3 plow tractor had to be postponed until the end of the war. The Model 30 finally went into production in 1946. Canada Post commemorated the 50th anniversary of the Model 30's launch with a postage stamp on June 8, 1996. Only 441 Model 30s were manufactured that first year. In 1947, production of the Model 30 hit its full stride when 6,263 were built. Thus, the Model 30 was the first modern production tractor built in Canada. The high water mark of production of the Model 30 was reached in 1948 when 10,665 tractors were made and marketed across Canada. The Cockshutt Model 30 was painted vermillion red in colour with cream white wheels front and rear and with cream white lettering on the tractor. The Model 30 was powered by a 153-cubic-inch (2.51 L) engine made by the Buda Engine Company of Harvey, Illinois.

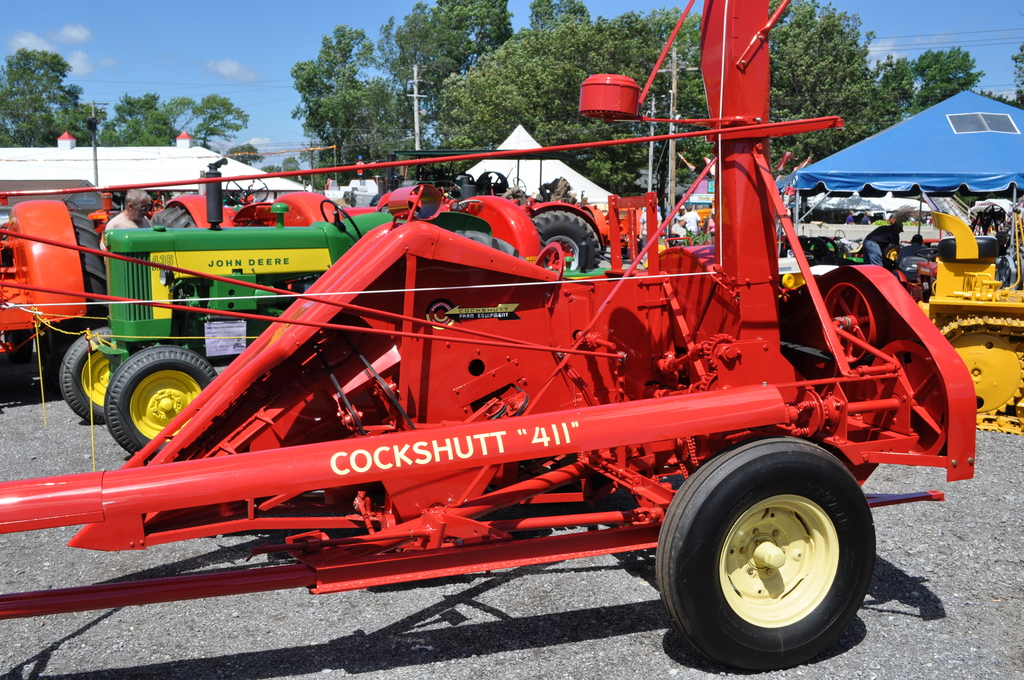
A Cockshutt 411 forage harvester

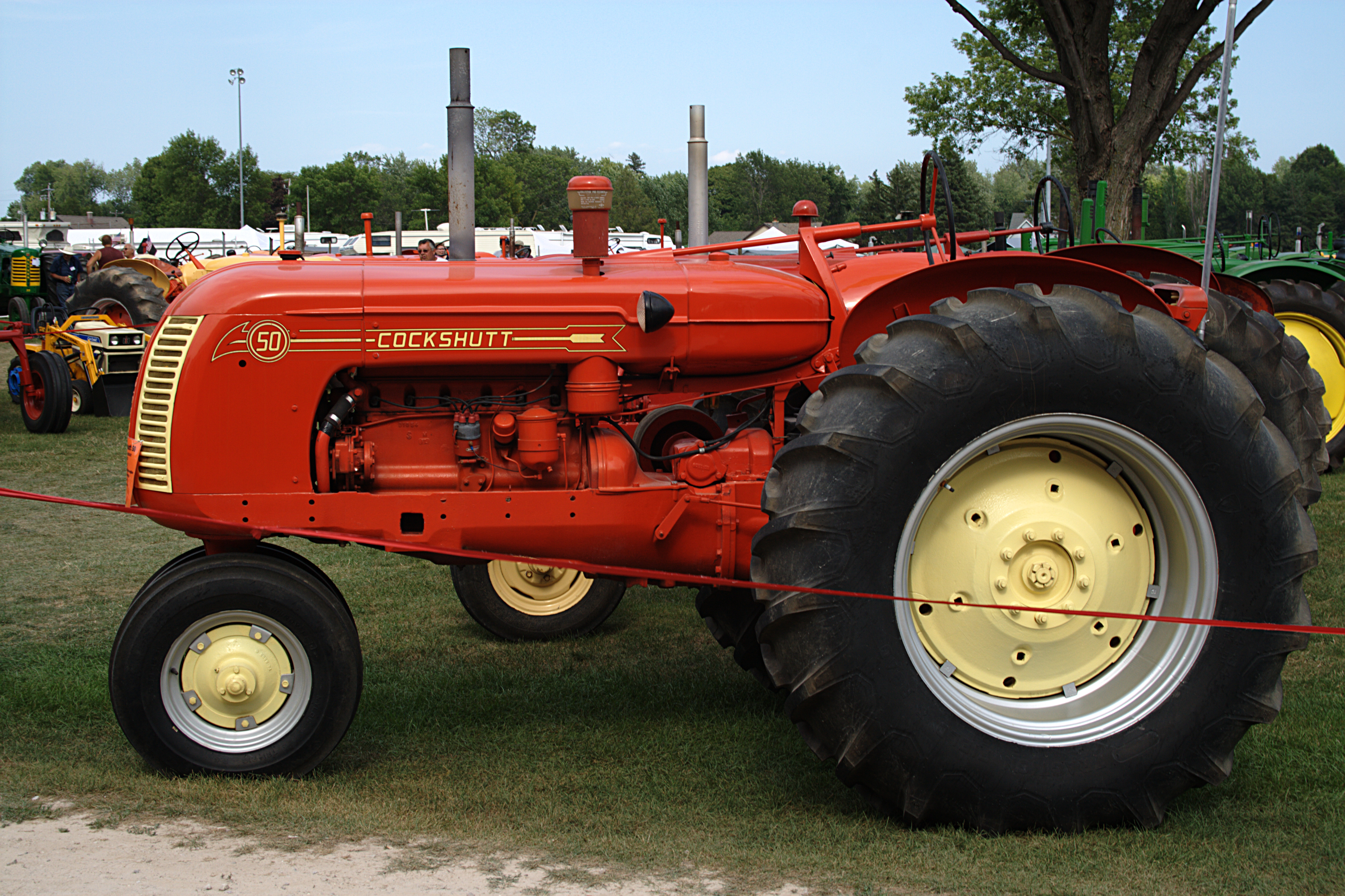
Restored Cockshutt 50 tractor

Cockshutt had always intended to sell its new Model 30 beyond the borders of Canada. The company especially wanted to enter the large farm tractor market south of the border in the United States. However, Cockshutt had no sales network in the United States. Consequently, in 1945, Cockshutt signed two marketing agreements with United States organizations. The first agreement was signed with the National Farm Machinery Co-operative (NFMC) in the midwestern United States. Under the terms of this agreement the Model 30 tractors sold in the United States would be sold under the "Co-op" name. The tractors would be painted entirely "pumpkin orange" with black lettering and would be re-designated as the Co-op E-3 tractor. The NFMC would wholesale the Model E-3 tractors to various local farmer-owned co-operatives. These local farmer-owned co-operatives, spread over 10 states in the midwestern part of the United States, would then retail the Model E-3 tractors to the consuming farming public. Some of these locally owned farmer-owned co-operatives, especially those located in Michigan, Ohio, and Indiana, were affiliated with the American Farm Bureau. By October 1946 the new orange Model E-3 tractors were rolling off the assembly line at the Brantford factory and were beginning to show up at local farmer-owned co-operatives all across the Midwest of the United States. The Canadian Co-operative Implements Limited (CCIL) also marketed the Co-op E3, E4, and E5 in Canada.

Co-op Model E-3 tractors were also marketed to local farmer-owned co-operatives located in Wisconsin, Minnesota, North and South Dakota, and Montana. These tractors were wholesaled by the Farmers Union Grain Exchange located in St. Paul, Minnesota. In order to promote the sales of the Model E-3 tractor in the United States, Cockshutt sent one of the Model 30/Co-op E-3 tractors to Lincoln, Nebraska, to be tested by the staff at the University of Nebraska from May 21 through June 3, 1947. Testing of the Model 30/Co-op E-3 tractor revealed that the tractor delivered 32.95 horsepower (24.57 kW) to the belt pulley and 28.43 horsepower (21.20 kW) to the drawbar.

Following introduction of the Model 30, Cockshutt added the larger 45-horsepower (34 kW), 3-4 plow Cockshutt 40 in 1949 and added the smaller 25-horsepower (19 kW), 2-plow Cockshutt 20 in 1952, and finally in 1953 the Company added the still larger 60-horsepower (45 kW), 4-5 plow Cockshutt 50 to the emerging line of Cockshutt farm tractors. The Cockshutt Blackhawk 35 was introduced in 1956 to promote the acquisition of the Ohio Cultivator Company. The tractor covered the mid-range of the market, with 42.5 horsepower (31.7 kW); 1850 of the models were built, and a beautiful print was made of the cream and orange tractor.

In 1958, Cockshutt introduced a complete new line of tractors at the same time: the 540, 550, 560, and 570. The sheet metal of the 500 series was designed by Raymond Loewy, a well known automobile designer of the era. The design set a new standard in modern styling. The Model 540 was 30-horsepower (22 kW), 2-3 plow; Model 550 was a 40-horsepower (30 kW), 3-plow; Model 560 was a 50-horsepower (37 kW), 4-plow, and the Model 570 was a 65-horsepower (48 kW), 5-plow design. The big-brother Model 580 was never mass-produced; the first three hand-assembled units were on the shop floor in the plant when the shut down order came in early 1962. It was a 100-horsepower (75 kW) unit, and one tractor escaped demolition.

In 1958, the company ownership was taken over by English Transcontinental, a British mercantile bank buying on behalf of an American investment group that became the forerunner of White. The Company name was changed to Cockshutt Farm Equipment Limited, and was acquired by White Motor Company in January 1962. White had previously acquired Oliver Corporation in late 1960 and subsequently bought Minneapolis-Moline in early 1963.

Immediately after assuming control in early 1962, White opted to cease production in Brantford, but to take advantage of Cockshutt's eight decades of brand loyalty, they continued to sell Cockshutt tractors. Manufactured during the 1964-1969 period, the **50 series from 1450 to 2150 were identical to Oliver tractors of the same model number. They were manufactured at the Oliver plant in Charles City, Iowa, and differed from Olivers only in paint colour and bearing the new Cockshutt logo. They covered the horsepower range 55 to 110, essentially the same as the Cockshutt Models 560, 570, and 580. After acquiring Minneapolis-Moline, White began selling the M-M Jet Star 3 as a Cockshutt 1350, a 45-horsepower (34 kW) tractor filling the Cockshutt Model 550 spot. Ultimately, White also offered a diesel import manufactured by Fiat as a Cockshutt: the 40-horsepower (30 kW) Model 1265 a 3-cylinder unit replacing the Cockshutt Model 540.

White established White Farm Equipment in 1969 to merge and further consolidate the three acquisitions and by 1975 had discontinued all three of the previous brand names and began offering White equipment, distinguished by its primarily silver paint job. The Cockshutt name was no longer used beyond the mid-70s.
