= Farmall France =

Brand of tractors made by International Harvester in France

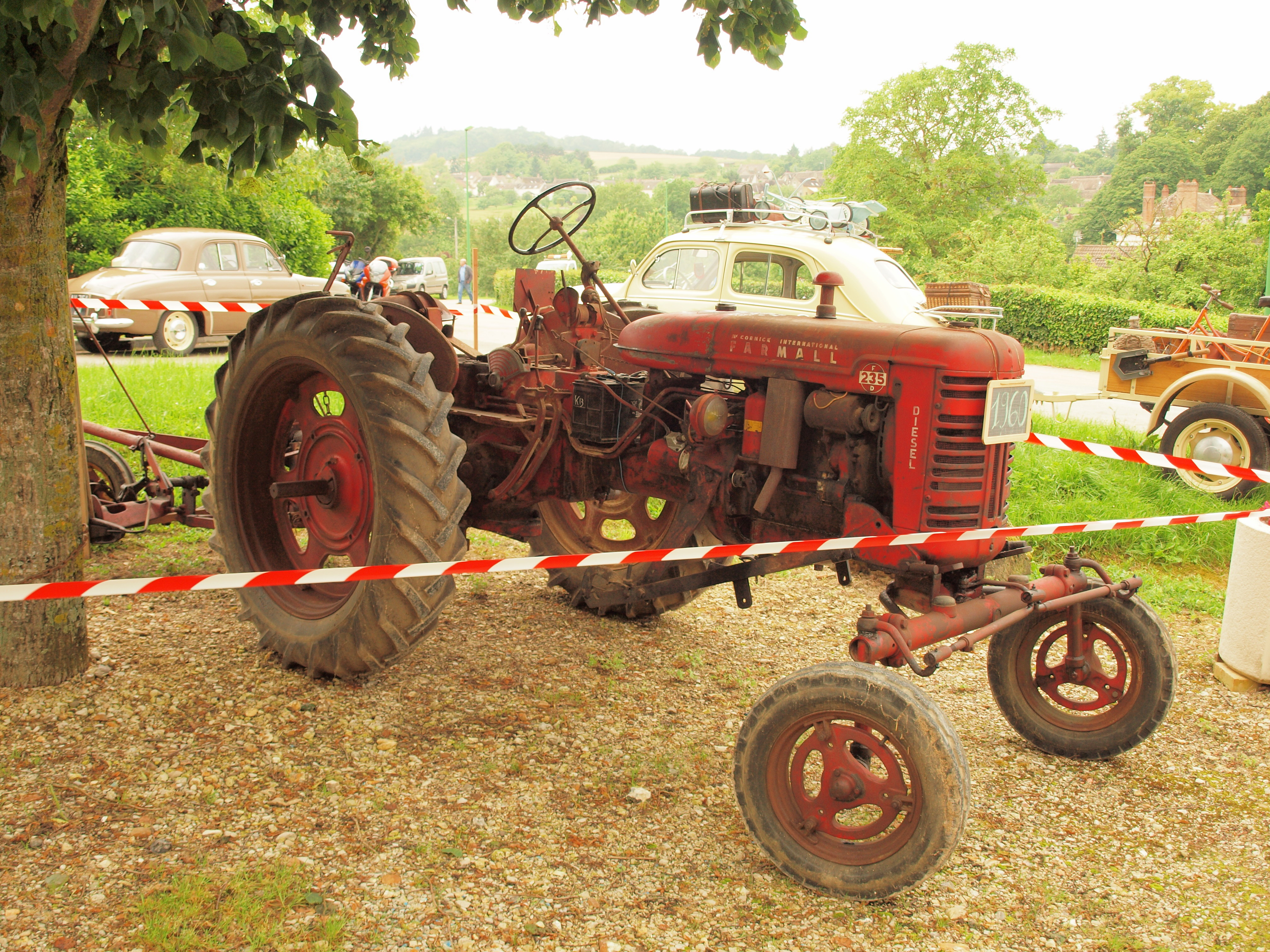
1960 Farmall F-235

International Harvester's Farmall brand of tractors were built in France between 1951 and 1964. Initially produced from US-made components, tractors were made at the International Harvester (IH) plant in Saint-Dizier with French parts from 1952. A range of models were produced, many based on the Farmall C, with special narrow-track models for use in vineyards. The offering gradually broadened, with adaptations of IH Germany models. The Farmall brand was phased out in 1964, with subsequent machines bearing the International Harvester brand.

== History ==
McCormick agricultural machinery was marketed in France beginning in 1855. Following the consolidation the created the International Harvester (IH) company in 1902, a French branch of IH was established in 1906 as the Compagnie International des Machines Agricoles (CIMA), selling Deering and Osborne-branded equipment. A merger with distributor Wallut broadened the product line to include McCormick in 1934, with products sold under the Wallut label. A 1948 consolidation saw the end of the Wallut name.

The Marshall Plan funded the reconstruction of a factory in Saint-Dizier, which started assembling the Farmall C from United States-made parts in 1951. By 1964 the Farmall brand was discontinued, in favor of the International Harvester brand.

== French production ==
Starting in 1952 the Farmall Super FC was produced with French parts and an American-made motor. The Farmall FC-N followed, with a diesel engine. By 1953 all components were being produced in France, and the Farmall Super FC-C (carbureted gasoline), Farmall FC-E (essence distillate), and Farmall Super FC-D diesel were being produced with wide and narrow front axles and an overall-narrow version for vineyards. In 1956 Farmall Cubs were being produced from parts, followed by an all-French Super Cub.

== Farmall F-235 ==
The Farmall F-235 began production at Saint-Dizier in 1957, representing an improved FC line with a hydraulic lift, in Farmall row-crop, utility and vineyard versions, designated F-235-D in diesel versions, FV-V 265D for vineyards, and FU-235 for utility tractors. Both diesel and gasoline versions used a 26-horsepower (19 kW) 123-cubic-inch (2,020 cc) four-cylinder engine.

=== Farmall F-237 ===
From 1961 the Farmall F-237 replaced the F-235, continuing with three versions.

=== Farmall F-270 ===
The Farmall F-270 appeared in 1963, representing a restyling of the F-237. The 270 used a common component set with the 240, only with a more powerful 40-horsepower (30 kW) engine. Regular and narrow vineyard models were produced. The 270 and 240 were the last Farmall-branded models produced in France.

== Farmall F-135D ==
The Farmall F-135D was a French derivative of a German-made International Harvester two-cylinder tractor, made beginning in 1958.The vineyard version was designed the FV-V 135D. It was upgraded and rebadged as the Farmall F-137D in 1961, which was produced until 1964.

== Farmall F-335D ==
The Farmall F-335D was a diesel-only French version of the Farmall 350, with features such as a torque amplifier and an upgraded power take-off.

== Farmall F-265 ==
The Farmall F-265 was introduced as the F-245 in 1958 and quickly renamed.

=== Farmall F-267 ===
In 1961 the F-235 was rebadged as the F-267.

=== Farmall F-240 ===
The Farmall F-240 appeared in 1963, representing a restyling of the F-267. The 240 used a common component set with the 270, only with a 30-horsepower (22 kW) engine. Regular and narrow vineyard models were produced. The 270 and 240 were the last Farmall-branded models produced in France, concluding in 1964.
