= F12 =

F12 may refer to:

== Vehicles ==
Aircraft

- Fokker F.XII, a Dutch airliner
- Larson F-12 Baby, an American sport biplane
- Lockheed YF-12, an American prototype interceptor aircraft
- Republic XF-12 Rainbow, an American prototype reconnaissance aircraft

Automobiles (cars and trucks)

- Alpina B6 (F12), a German grand tourer
- BMW 6 Series (F12), a German grand tourer
- DKW F12, a German saloon car
- Farmall F-12, an American tractor
- Ferrari F12 an Italian grand tourer
- Volvo F12, a Swedish truck

Farm tractors

- Farmall F-12, an American tractor

Ships

- HMS Achilles (F12), a Leander-class frigate of the Royal Navy
- HMS Kashmir (F12), a K-class destroyer of the Royal Navy
- HMS Venturer (F12), an upcoming Type 31 frigate.
- Italian submarine F12, a submarine of the Italian Regia Marina (Royal Navy)

== Other uses ==
- F12 (classification), a disability sport classification
- F12 (gene), coding for coagulation factor XII
- F12 Developer Tools, built into Microsoft Internet Explorer and Microsoft Edge
- F 12 Kalmar, a former Swedish Air Force wing
- F12, a function key on a computer keyboard
- Flat-12, an automobile engine
