= Farmall A =

Row crop tractor

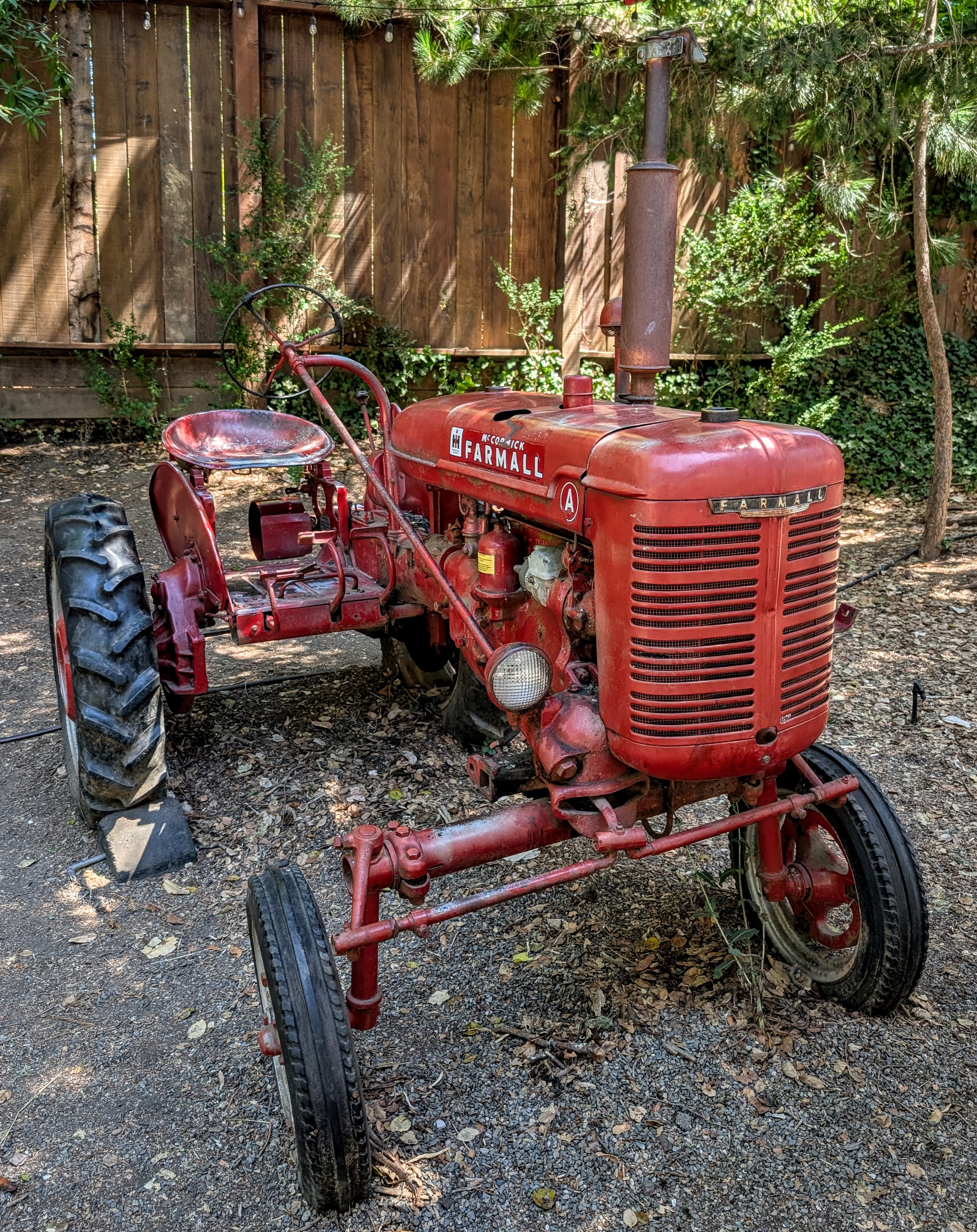
- Farmall A at Alice's Restaurant, Sky Londa, California
- Type: Row-crop agricultural tractor
- Manufacturer: International Harvester
- Production: 1939-1954
- Length: 106.8 inches (271 cm)
- Width: 62 inches (160 cm)
- Height: 64.25 inches (163.2 cm) (to wheel)
- Weight: 3,570 pounds (1,620 kg)
- Propulsion: Rear wheels
- Engine model: International Harvester C113
- Gross power: 17 horsepower (13 kW)
- PTO power: 18.34 horsepower (13.68 kW) (belt)
- Drawbar power: 16.32 horsepower (12.17 kW)
- Drawbar pull: 2,387 pounds (1,083 kg)
- NTTL test: 329
- Preceded by: Farmall F-14
- Succeeded by: Super A/A-1, followed by Farmall 100/130/140

The Farmall A is a small one-plow row crop tractor produced by International Harvester under the Farmall brand from 1939 to 1947. The tractor was popular for its set of innovative features in a small, affordable implement. It succeeded the Farmall F-14. The A was incrementally updated with new model numbers as the Super A, 100, 130 and 140, but remained essentially the same machine. Like the smaller Farmall Cub, the Farmall A features a distinctive offset engine, displaced to the left over wide-set front wheels, to allow vision straight ahead. An International Harvester C113 4-cylinder in-line engine was used for early models, increased to an IH C123 with the A-1. The most significant change was the introduction of hydraulics with the Super A. The series was produced until 1973.

== Description and production ==
Styled by Raymond Loewy, it was one of International Harvester's "letter series", with 117,522 produced over the 8-year run, replacing the Farmall F-14. The A was rated for one 14-inch (36 cm) plow.

The Farmall A is equipped with the F-14's International Harvester C113 4-cylinder inline overhead valve engine, with a 113-cubic-inch (1,850-cubic-centimetre) displacement. The transmission contains five total gears in a sliding gear arrangement: four forward and one reverse, transmitted to a portal axle. The A featured a wide front wheel track with an offset engine, intended to allow for a better view ahead and branded "Cultivision." The Model A had a 20-pound stamped-steel disk on the left rear wheel and a 170-pound cast-iron disk on the right wheel; the right front wheel had a bolted on weight. The offset engine benefited front-mounted cultivators, compared with the towed equipment used by competing Ford-Ferguson tractors. As with other Farmall letter-series tractors, the design featured an integral frame and unitary construction, allowing entire assemblies to be replaced. Rear wheels on all models used a geared portal axle to provide sufficient ground clearance, and could be adjusted in width over a range of 40 inches (100 cm) to 68 inches (170 cm).

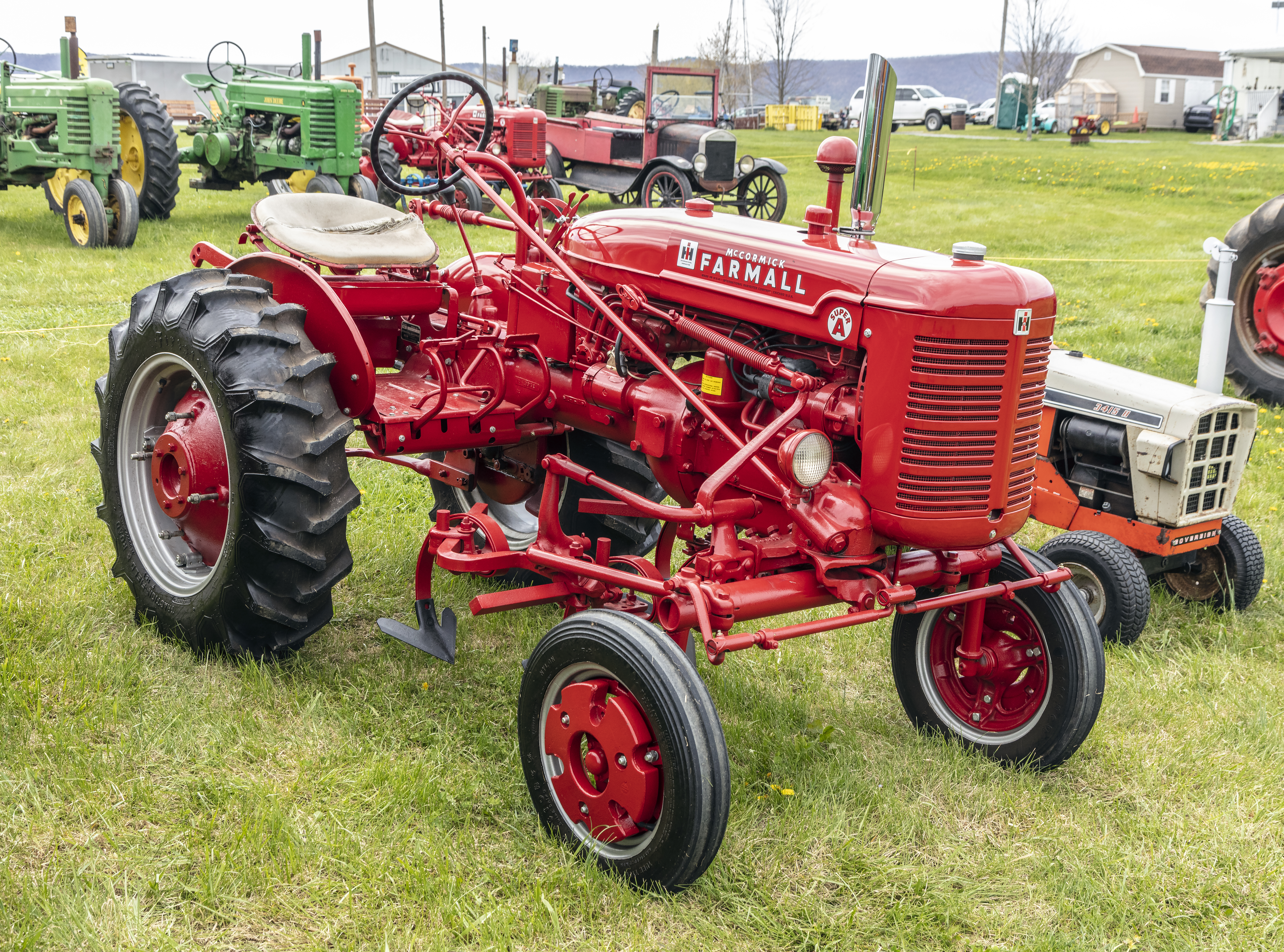
Farmall Super A

=== A variants ===
Versions were produced for both gasoline and kerosene fuel. The Farmall B is essentially the same tractor, but with the engine centered for narrow front wheels, and the seat offset instead of the engine, with a wider range of rear wheel adjustment for two-row cultivation. The AV hiboy variant, with 5 inches (13 cm) more clearance, was intended for vegetable crops, and the International A (or AI) for industrial use. The International A featured a foot throttle and a heavier front axle, and was chiefly used as a mower. About 210,000 As and Bs were produced, selling for between $575 and $1,000.

== Super A ==
From 1947 to 1954, International Harvester produced the Farmall Super A, with the same engine displacement, but with a hydraulic lift system. About 94,000 Super A tractors were produced, including Super AV variants. In 1954 the Super A-1 was produced, using a higher-rpm International Harvester C123 engine, and was otherwise identical to the Super A.The Super A/A-1 was replaced by the Farmall 100.

== Farmall 100 ==
Farmall 100
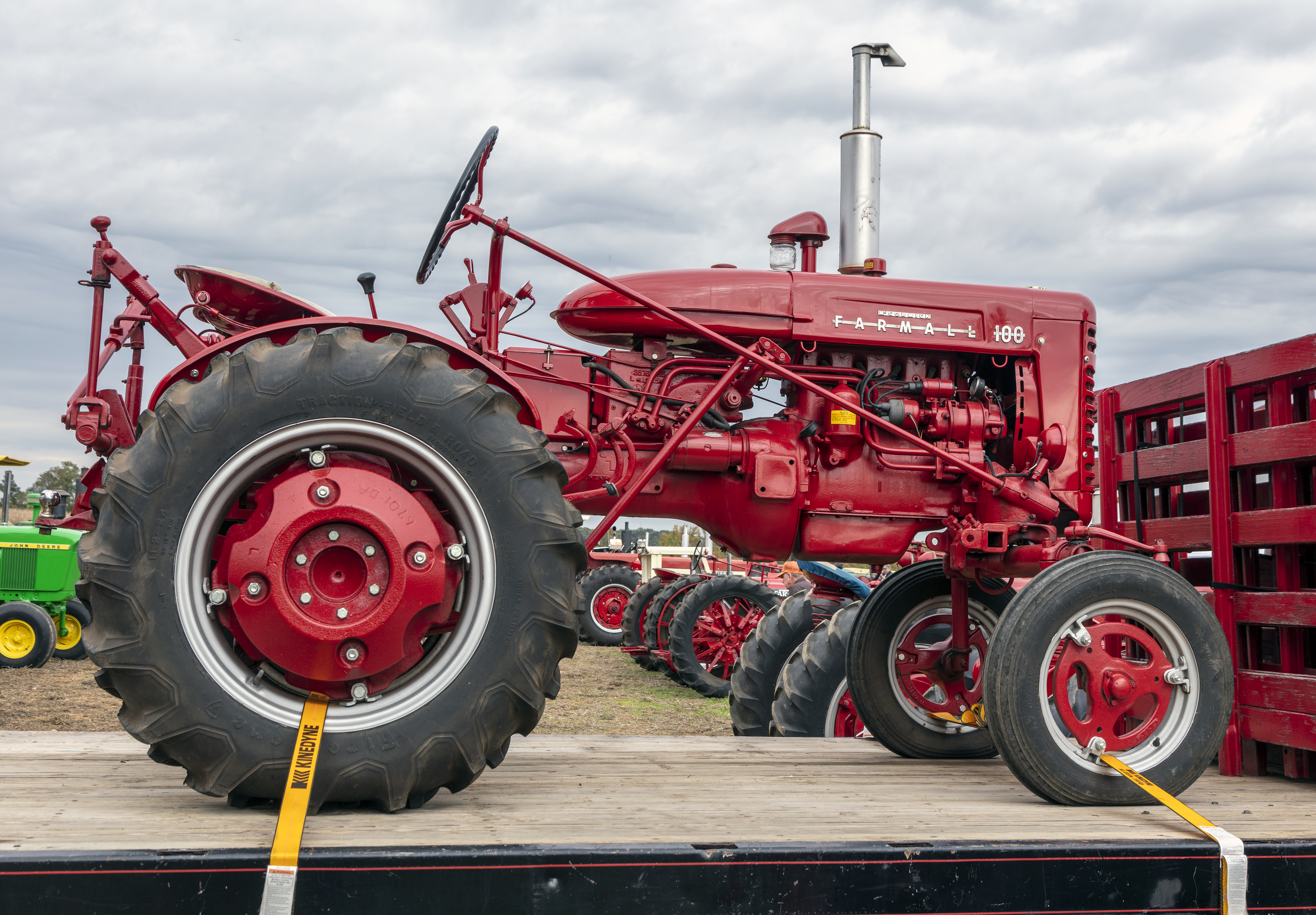
- A Farmall 100 on a flatbed
- Type: Row-crop agricultural tractor
- Manufacturer: International Harvester
- Production: 1954-1956
- Length: 107 inches (270 cm)
- Width: 62
- Height: 65 inches (170 cm) (to steering wheel)
- Weight: 3,000 pounds (1,400 kg) operating, 4,333 pounds (1,965 kg) ballasted
- Propulsion: Rear wheels
- Engine model: International Harvester C123 (gasoline)
- Gross power: 22 horsepower (16 kW)
- PTO power: 20.13 horsepower (15.01 kW) (belt)
- Drawbar power: 17.83 horsepower (13.30 kW)
- Drawbar pull: 2,503 pounds (1,135 kg)
- NTTL test: 537
- Preceded by: Farmall Super A-1
- Succeeded by: Farmall 130

The Farmall 100 was introduced in 1955 as an update to the A-1. It was identical to the A-1 in all respects, but with a new grille and raised chrome lettering. Engines could still be configured for gasoline, kerosene or distillate. Total production was 16,191, with an additional 1,057 high-clearance models. The IH 100 was produced as an industrial tractor.

== Farmall 130 ==
The Farmall 130 was produced from 1956 to 1958. It differed from the 100 in having white trim and a higher compression ratio. The IH 130 was produced as an industrial tractor, and a high-crop version, called the 130 HiClear, was produced. About 15,000 130s were produced, selling for about $2,000.

== Farmall 140 ==
The Farmall 140 was similar to the 130, but with a 12-volt electrical system in lieu of six volts. It was produced from 1958 to 1973. In 1963 it was restyled in a squared-off manner to match larger Farmall tractors. Total production was 66,290. The IH 140 was produced as an industrial tractor, and a high-crop version, called the 140 Hi-Clear, was produced. Sale prices were between $2,400 and $4,300.

== Comparable products ==
Comparable products to the A included the Ford 9N, Allis-Chalmers C, John Deere H, and Case VC. The Massey Pacer was similar to the 100. The Ford 640 was comparable to the 130. The Ford 651 and Oliver Super 66 were similar to the 140 and 240.
