= F14 (disambiguation) =

The Grumman F-14 Tomcat is an American jet fighter aircraft.

F14, F.XIV, F.14 or F-14 may also refer to:

- Curtiss XF14C, a 1941 American naval fighter aircraft
- Fokker F.XIV, a 1920s Dutch cargo plane
- Fokker F-14, a 1929 American transport aircraft
- Ferrari F14 T, a Formula One racing car
- Farmall F-14, a model of Farmall tractor
- Fluorine-14 (F-14 or ^{14}F), an isotope of fluorine
- F14, a former Swedish Air Force Base, now Halmstad Airport
- Italian submarine F14, an Italian Regia Marina (Royal Navy) submarine commissioned in 1917 and sunk in a collision in 1928
- Lockheed F-14, the US Army Air Corps designation used briefly for the reconnaissance variant of the Lockheed P-80 Shooting Star
