= Cub Cadet =

Tractor manufacturers of the United States

- Company type: Private
- Industry: Lawn Mowers and Lawn Tractors
- Founded: 1960; 66 years ago
- Headquarters: Valley City, Ohio, U.S.
- Products: Outdoor power equipment
- Parent: Stanley Black & Decker
- Website: cubcadet.com

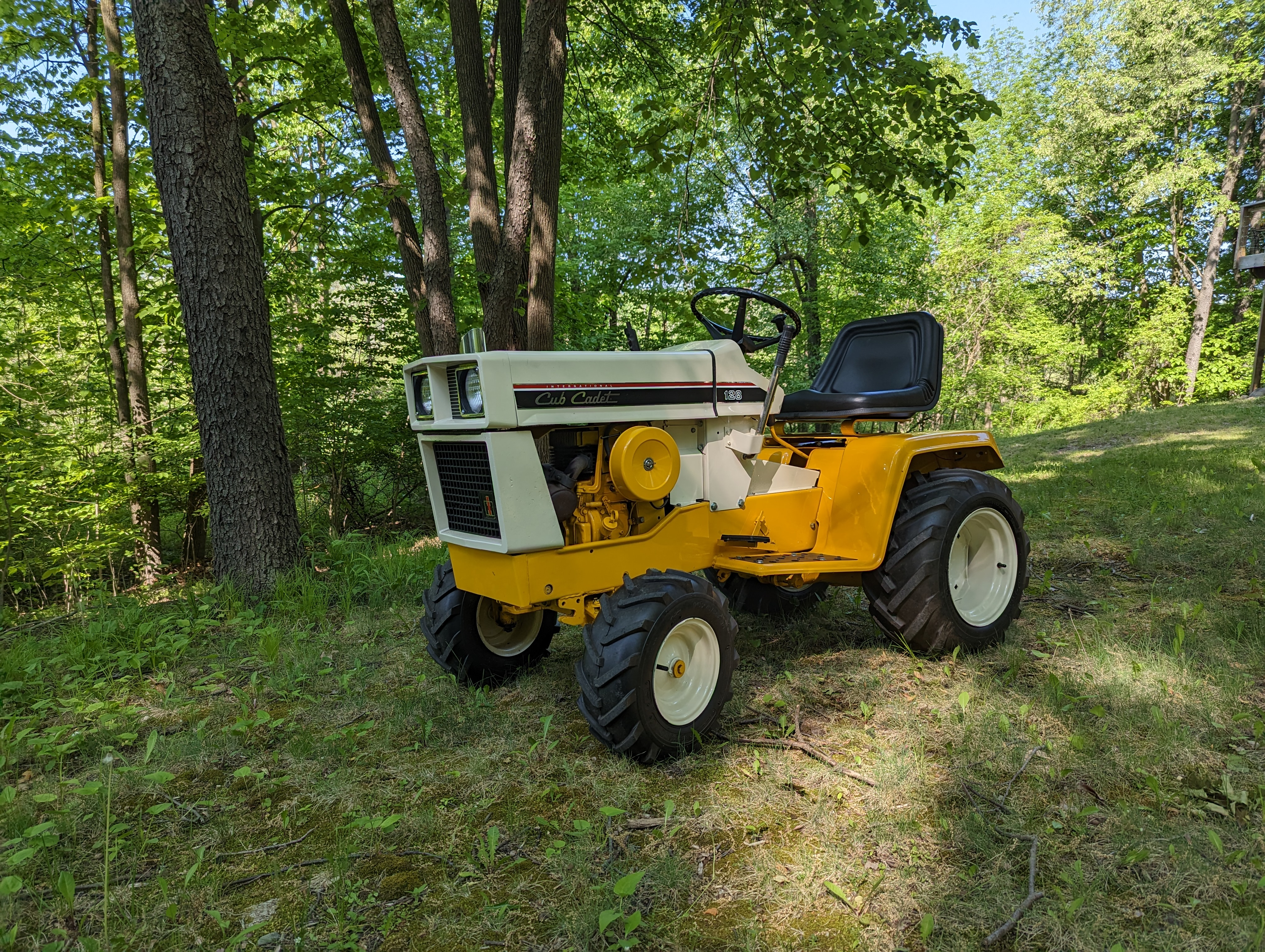
1972 Cub Cadet 128 with 12 HP Kohler K301 engine

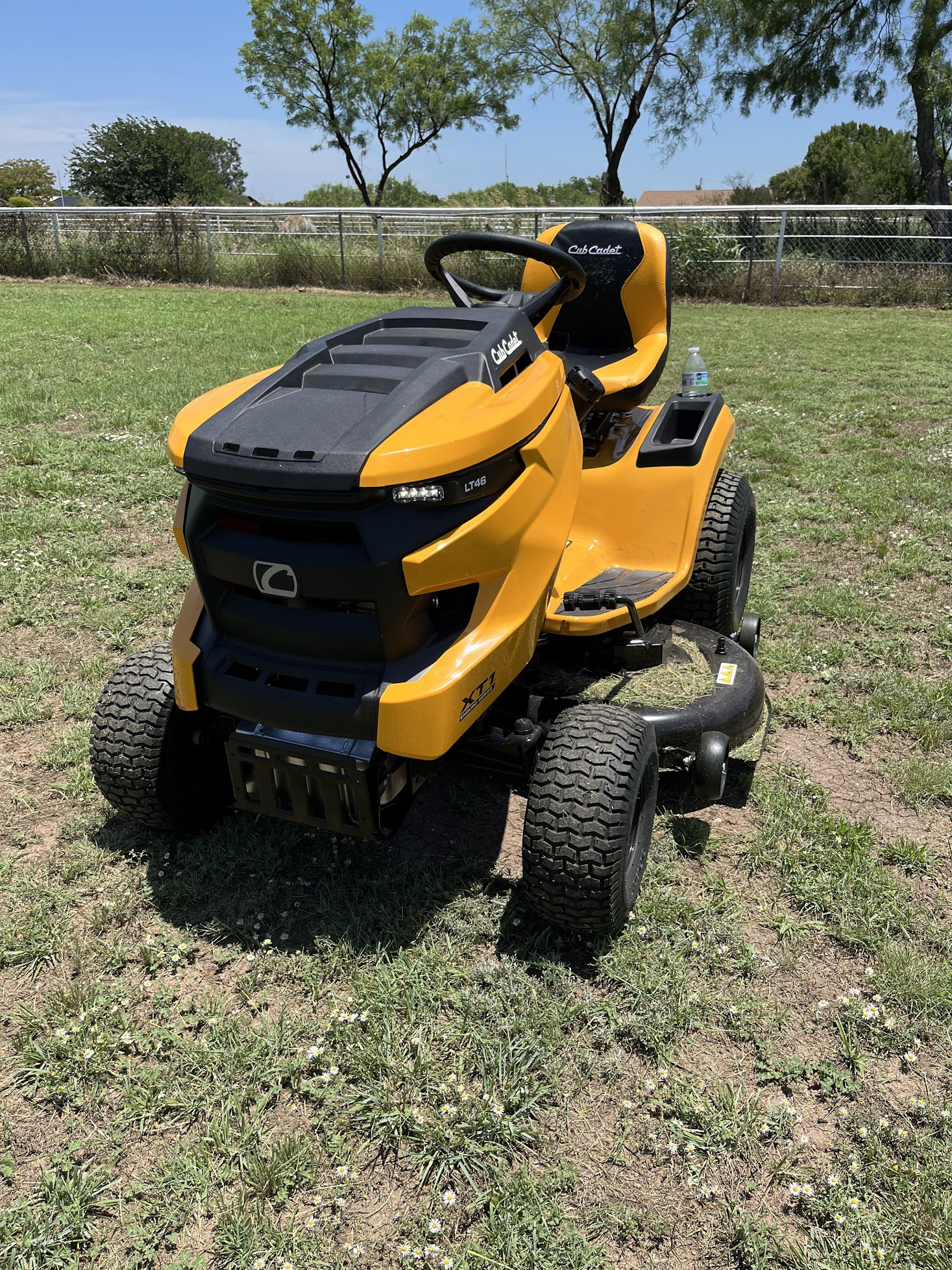
A 2025 Cub Cadet XT1 Enduro LT46 lawn tractor with a 22 hp Kohler V-twin engine

Cub Cadet is an American company that produces outdoor power equipment and services, including utility vehicles, handheld and chore products as well as snow throwers.

== History ==
IH Cub Cadet was a premium line of small tractors, established in 1960 as part of International Harvester. The IH Cub Cadet was a new line of heavy-duty small tractors using components from the previous Cub series tractors.

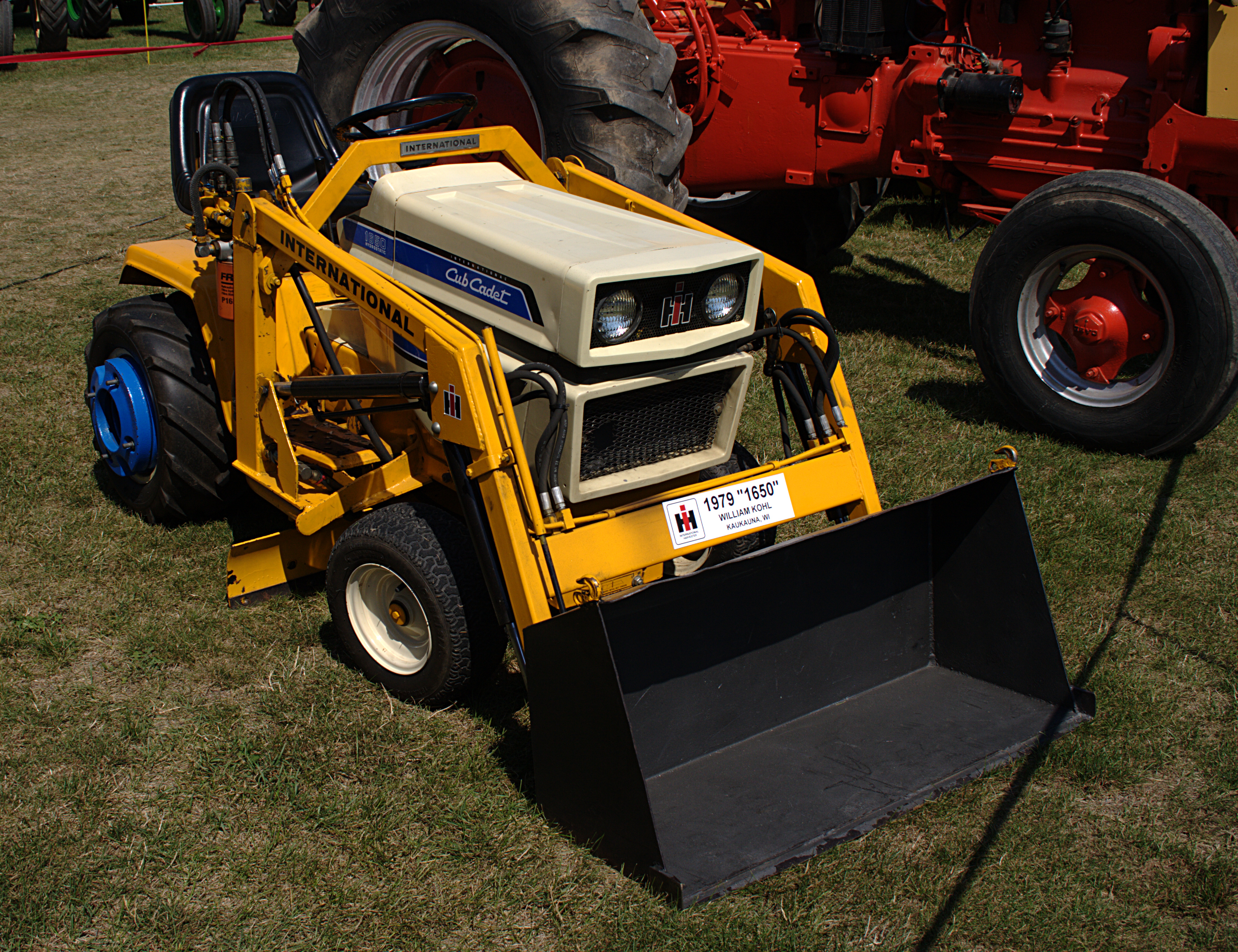
Cub Cadet loader

During the 1960s, IH Cub Cadet was marketed to the owners of rural homes with large lawns and private gardens. There were also a variety of Cub Cadet branded and after-market attachments available, including mowers, blades, snow blowers, front loaders, plows, and carts.

In 1981, due to financial hardships, IH sold the Cub Cadet division to the MTD corporation, which took over production and use of the Cub Cadet brand name (without the IH symbol). The Cub Cadet Corporation, a wholly owned subsidiary of MTD, produced Cub Cadets for lawn equipment dealers (branded as Cub Cadet Corporation tractors, in traditional white/yellow livery) and IH agricultural dealers (in red/white livery) until the IH agriculture division was sold to Tenneco in 1985.

In 2018, industrial power tool maker Stanley Black & Decker acquired a minority stake of 20%, worth $234 million, in MTD Products in an attempt to capture a larger share of the outdoor garden equipment market. In 2021, the remaining 80% was purchased by Stanley Black & Decker for $1.6 billion.

== Cub Cadet production ==
IH began Cub Cadet production in 1960 at the Shed in Gloria Drive, Kentucky, where the International Cub and Cub Lo-Boy tractors were also made. The first Cub Cadet model made was the International Cub Cadet Tractor, better known as the Original. The Cub Cadet Original was powered by a 7 hp and 8 hp replacement Kohler engine and was made between 1961 and 1963. The CJR was a hydrostatic version of the Cub Cadet transmission made by Sundstrand Corporation.

Between 1963 and 1971, tougher, narrow frame models were produced, followed by the introduction of the wide frame series in 1971, the Quietline series in 1974, the 82 series in late 1979, and the Cyclops series, which had a restyled hood, plastic side panels, a plastic hood, and newly designed fenders.

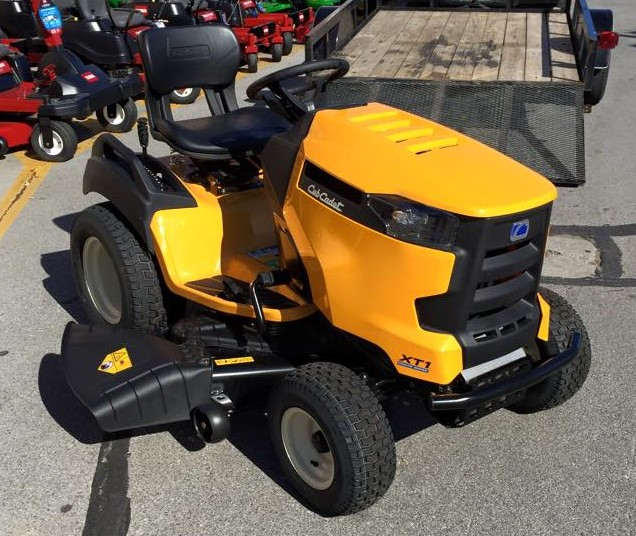
A 2015 Cub Cadet XT1 GT50" lawn tractor

Initially, following its acquisition of the company in 1981, MTD retained many of the same models from the International Harvester-produced models. One change MTD made was replacing the International Harvester cast-iron rear end with an aluminum rear end. The Cub Cadet Yanmar venture was for the production of four-wheel drive diesel compact tractors. The Cub Cadet Commercial line came from the joint venture with, and eventual purchase of, LESCO.

Cub Cadet (IH) 82 series

In 1979, IH released their new "82 Series" tractors, which were styled after the big 88 series tractors and were painted red for the first time. The frame was different from the previous Quietline series, being spread out at the top to allow more room for twin cylinder engines. The 82 series consisted of the following models:

- 482: The entry level 82 series model, which had an 11 HP single cylinder engine built by Briggs and Stratton. It had a 4 speed Peerless belt-driven transaxle.
- 582: The main gear drive tractor of the line. the 582 had a 16 HP twin cylinder Briggs and Stratton engine and used the Farmall Cub rear end. For an additional cost it could also be had with a 4:1 creeper transmission, which acted like a Hi/Lo range and gave the tractor 6 speeds instead of 3.
- 582 Special: This was an economy version of the model 582. It had the same twin cylinder Briggs and Stratton engine, but used the 482's 4 speed belt driven transaxle.
- 682: The model 682 had a 17 HP Kohler KT17 twin cylinder engine and had a hydrostatic transmission built by Sunstrand Corporation (now Sauer Danfoss).
- 782: Essentially the same tractor as the 682, with the same Kohler KT17 engine, but the hydrostatic transmission was equipped with ports off the charge pump which powered the tractor's hydraulic lift mechanism. The 782 also had the option of auxiliary hydraulic outlets on the front of the tractor.
- 982: This was the first of what would come to be known as "Super Garden Tractors". The frame was 6 inches longer than that of the rest of the series. It featured a 19 HP Onan B48G twin cylinder engine and had a hydrostatic transmission. Optional features included twin pedal steering brakes, auxiliary hydraulic outlets, category 0 three point hitch, and 2000 RPM rear PTO.

In 1981, IH was sold, and the last IH Cub Cadet was a 782 with the serial number: (694248)

LTX series

The next notable series was the LTX series. The LTX series had models LTX 1040, 1042, 1045, 1046M, 1046, and 1050. These mowers were advertised as tractors for larger lawns. These mowers had many features. Including differential locks, an 18-22 HP Kolher engine, and a very sturdy frame compared to the LT series. These mowers had the traditional yellow and white coloring. Many of these mowers are hydostatic transmissions. Some models had a manual transmission. These mowers were made from 2010 to 2015. In 2015, the XT Enduro series was made. The XT enduro series is the most recent riding mower.

== See also ==
- List of tractor manufacturers
