= Farmall 1026 =

Row crop tractor

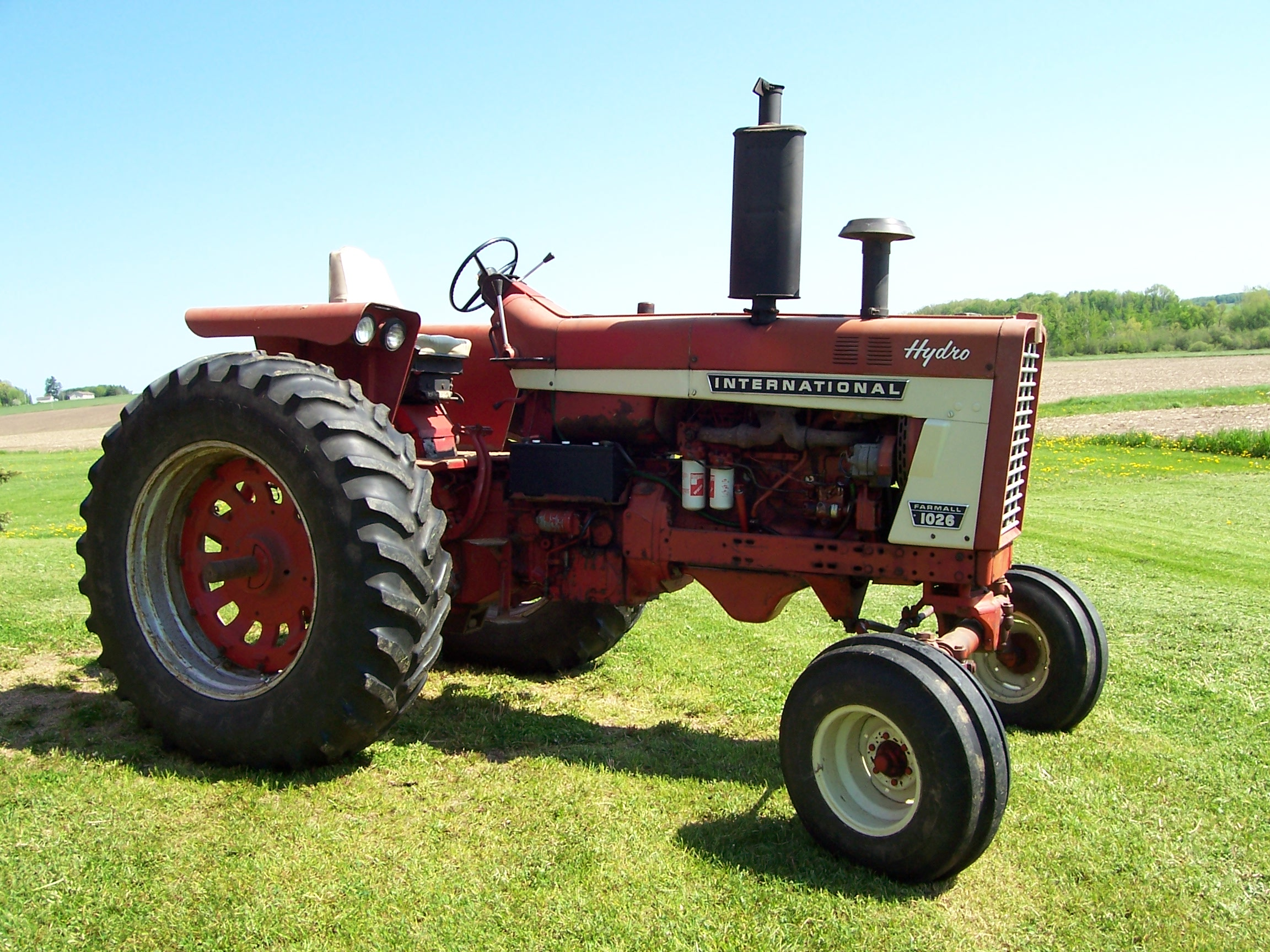
Farmall 1026

The Farmall 1026 is a row crop tractor with a hydraulic drive system, or hydro, produced by International Harvester from 1970–1971. Rated at 112 power take off, (PTO) horsepower, the Farmall 1026 was the first 100+ horsepower hydro tractor ever produced.

The 1026 was produced as a hydro only model. This was unique to this model, as the other hydro models produced by International Harvester at the time were also built as gear drive versions in addition to the hydro versions, while still maintaining the same model number. The Farmall 656 and 826, for example, were available in hydro and gear drive versions.

== Production data ==
Farmall 1026 production lasted only 2 years, with only 2,414 of the Farmall version built. The International, or standard version production totaled only 158. These totals are quite low compared to other tractor models built by International Harvester, and today the Farmall 1026 could be considered a rare tractor, and the International 1026 extremely rare.
