= Farmall Germany =

Farm tractor brand

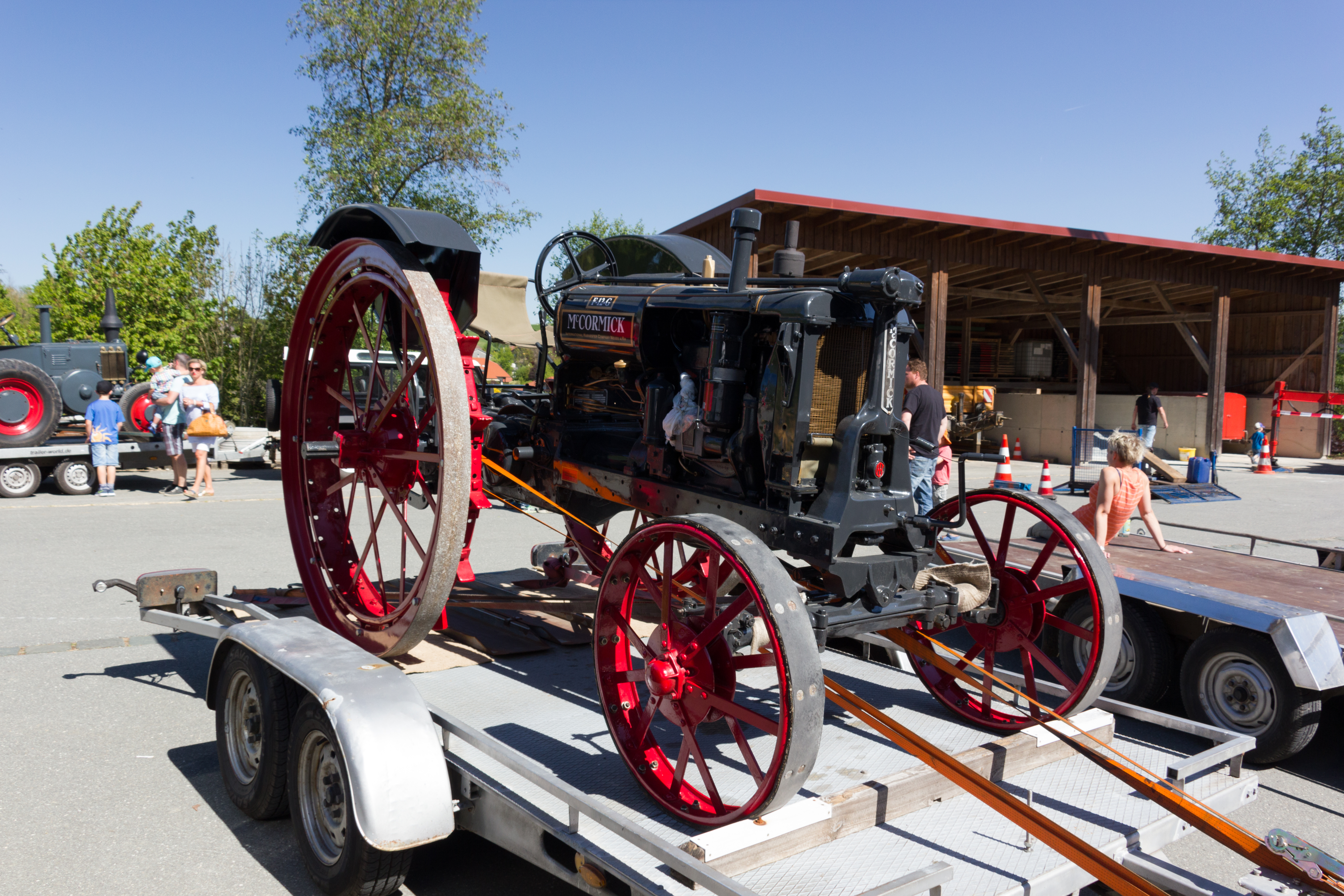
McCormick-branded F-12-G version of the Farmall F-12

International Harvester's Farmall brand of tractors was built in Germany between 1937 and 1959. For most of this time, the Farmall brand was not prominently used, even though the equipment was based on and styled similarly to the Farmall line. The D-217 Farmall was the product that most prominently displayed the brand. As IH Germany's product line increasingly diverged from that of the parent company, other brands were adopted, and most products were marketed as International.

== History ==
International had been selling tractors in Germany under the Deering and McCormick brands since the 1880s, consolidating under the International Harvester brand in 1902. International Harvester Company GmbH was established in 1908, at Neuss am Rhein to produce agricultural equipment in Germany. Production was disrupted during World War I, and was stopped in 1924 for three months when the Ruhr Valley was occupied by French forces. Production was shifted to tractors in 1936 in response to Nazi tariffs on imported machinery. The first domestic tractors were built starting in 1937, when F-12-Gs and their industrial counterparts, I-12-Gs were produced. The F-12-G was essentially the same as an American Farmall F-12. Production moved to FG rubber-tired tractors and FS steel-wheeled tractors in 1940.

As a result of fuel shortages during World War II and a ban on civilian use of gasoline, production moved to vehicles fueled by wood gas, models HG and HS. Production amounted to only 144 units, and about 70% of the Neuss plant was destroyed in Allied airstrikes.

Emergency production resumed in 1945 and the plant was restored, with new FS and FG tractors produced from August 1946. Although the FG and FS were updated with new styling, their gasoline engines were unpopular in Germany, and production shifted to diesel-engined models in 1950, the DF-25.

== F-line ==
The F-line started with the F-12-G, and moved to the FG and FS tractors. They were restyled beginning in 1949 with similar bodywork to U.S. models. The two-cylinder FGD2 was briefly produced before production shifted to the D-series. Products were marketed as McCormick-Deering rather than as Farmall.

== D-line ==
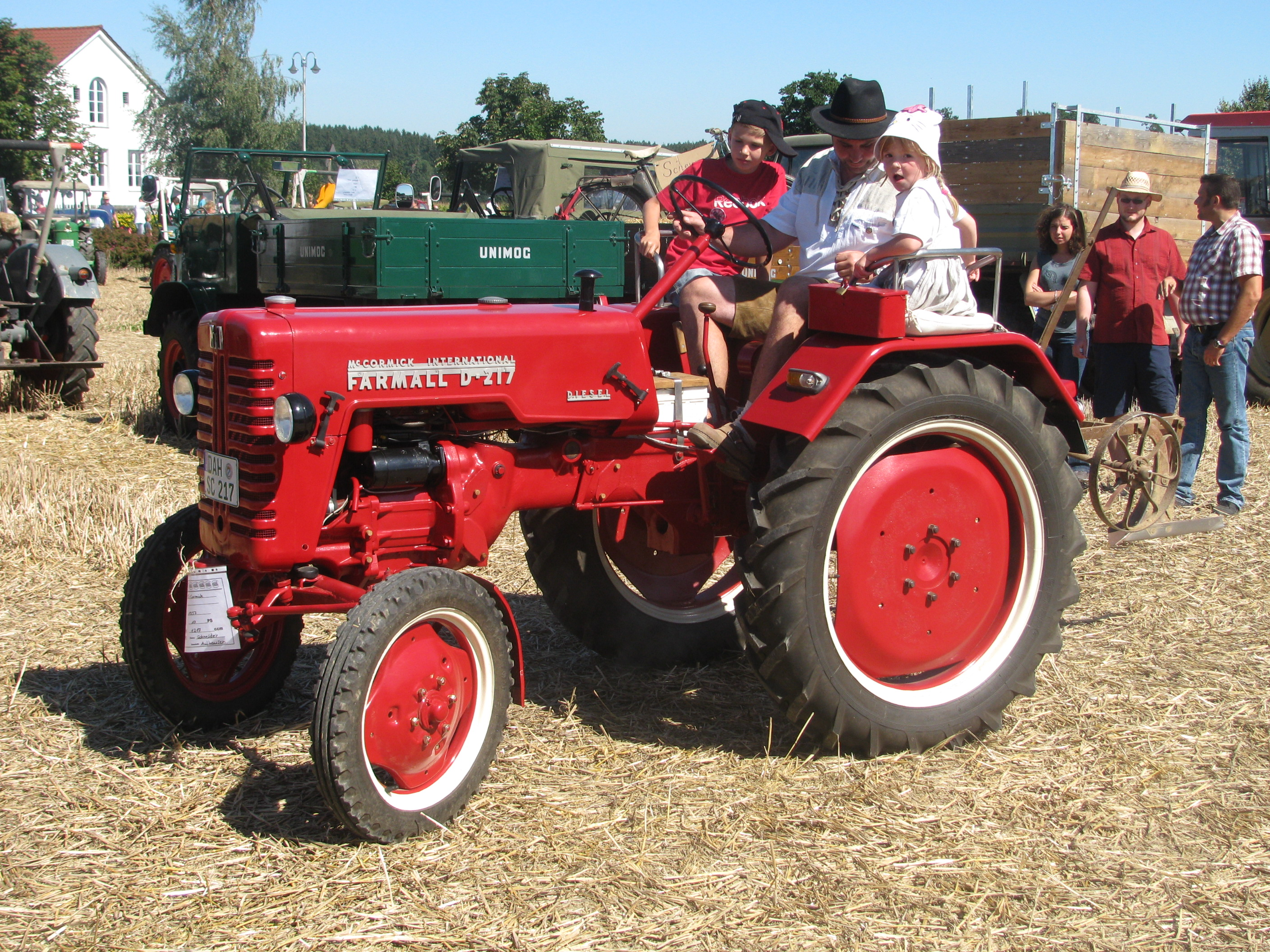
Farmall D-217

The first D-line models were the DLD2, with a two-cylinder 12-horsepower (8.9 kW) engine, the DED3, with a three-cylinder 20-horsepower (15 kW) engine, and the DGD4, with a four-cylinder 30-horsepower (22 kW) engine, all diesels.

The second-generation D-line offered a more diverse range of products, some marketed under the Farmall brand. The two-cylinder 12-horsepower (8.9 kW) D-212 and 176-horsepower (131 kW) D-217 Farmall were accompanied by the three-cylinder 20-horsepower (15 kW) D-320 and the four-cylinder 30-horsepower (22 kW) D-430.

The line expanded in 1958 with the two-cylinder 14-horsepower (10 kW) D-214 replacing the D-212, the four-cylinder 40-horsepower (30 kW) supercharged D-440, and the four-cylinder naturally-aspirated 36-horsepower (27 kW) D-436. Newer models shifted from Farmall branding to Standard branding, and "Agriomatic" was applied to higher-horsepower models. By the 1960s the Farmall brand had been dropped entirely, and new tractors were branded as McCormick International. After 1963, branding moved to simply International.
