= Farmall B =

Row crop tractor

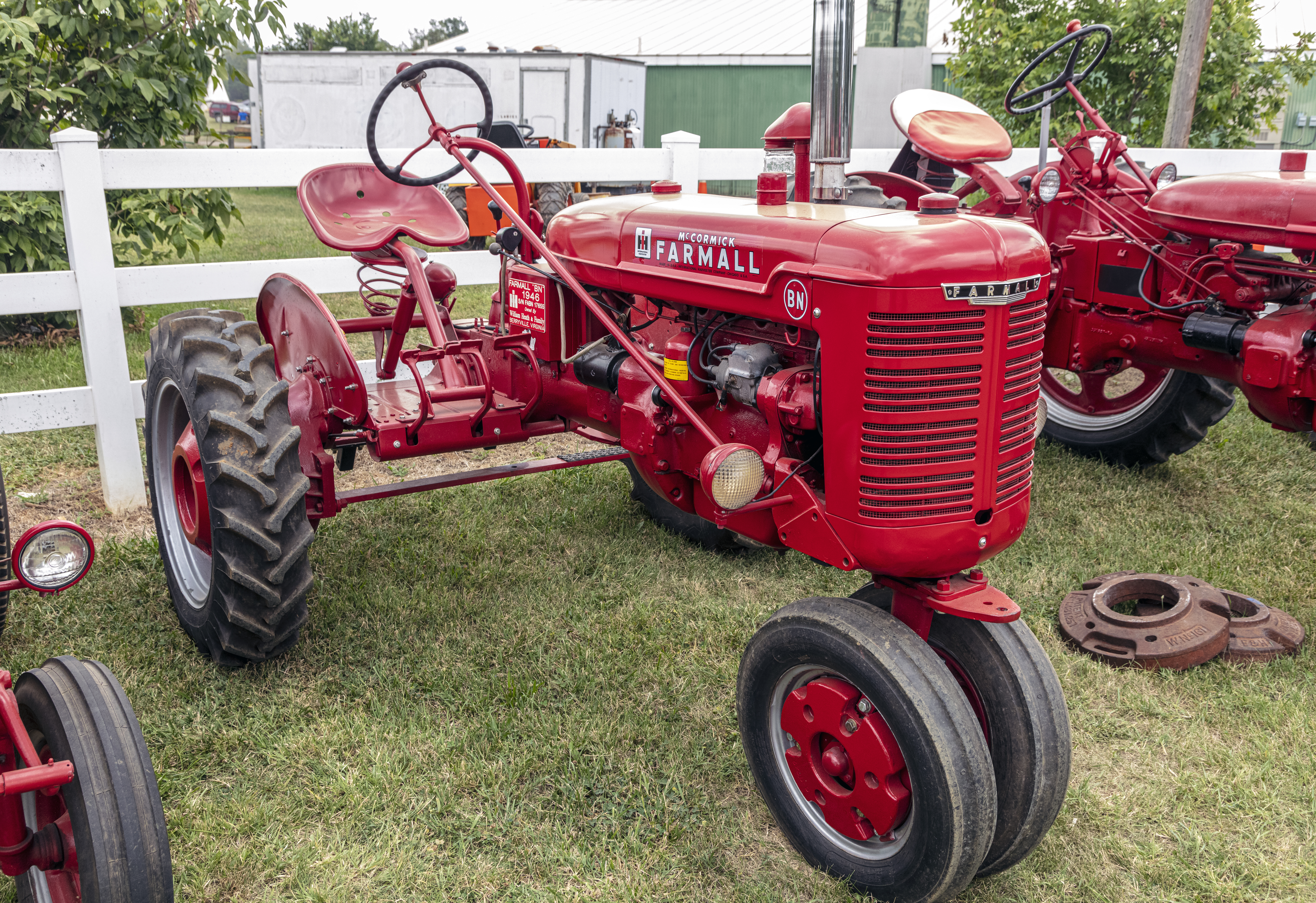
- Farmall BN
- Type: Row-crop agricultural tractor
- Manufacturer: International Harvester
- Production: 1939-1947
- Length: 108 inches (270 cm)
- Width: 79.5 inches (202 cm)
- Height: 65 inches (170 cm)
- Weight: 2,400 pounds (1,100 kg)
- Propulsion: Rear wheels
- Engine model: International Harvester C113
- Gross power: 20 horsepower (15 kW)
- PTO power: 18.39 horsepower (13.71 kW) (belt)
- Drawbar power: 16.21 horsepower (12.09 kW)
- Drawbar pull: 2,377 pounds (1,078 kg)
- NTTL test: 331
- Preceded by: Farmall F-14
- Succeeded by: Farmall C

The Farmall B is a small one-plow row crop tractor produced by International Harvester under the Farmall brand from 1939 to 1947. It was derived from the popular Farmall A, but was offered with a narrow set of centerline front wheels instead of the A's wide front axle, allowing two-row cultivation. The operator's seat was offset to the right to allow better forward visibility.

== Description and production ==
Styled by Raymond Loewy, it was one of International Harvester's "letter series", with 75,241 produced over the 8-year run. Mechanically identical to the Farmall A from which it was derived, B was rated for one 14-inch (36 cm) plow.

The B is equipped with the A's International Harvester C113 4-cylinder inline overhead valve engine, with a 113-cubic-inch (1,850-cubic-centimetre) displacement. The sliding-gear transmission contains five total gears: four forward and one reverse, transmitted via a portal axle. It was similar to the Farmall A, using the same engine moved back to the tractor's centerline, with a narrow front end, centrally placed, and with the seat offset to the right to preserve some of the A's cultivation visibility. The arrangement allowed two rows to be cultivated. As with other Farmall letter-series tractors, the design featured an integral frame and unitary construction, allowing entire assemblies to be replaced. Rear wheels on all models used a geared portal axle to provide sufficient ground clearance, and could be adjusted in width over a range of 64 inches (160 cm) to 92 inches (230 cm), allowing it to straddle wider rows than the A could. Versions were produced for both gasoline and kerosene fuel. About 210,000 As and Bs were produced, selling for between $575 and $1,000.

The B was replaced by the Farmall C in 1948.

From 1940 to 1947, International Harvester produced the Farmall BN, with the same engine displacement, but with a rear wheel width adjustment of 56 inches (140 cm) to 84 inches (210 cm) for narrower rows. About 1500 BN tractors were produced.

== Comparable products ==
Comparable products include the John Deere M, the Massey-Harris 20, and the Ferguson TE-20.
