= Farmall =

Model and brand of tractors

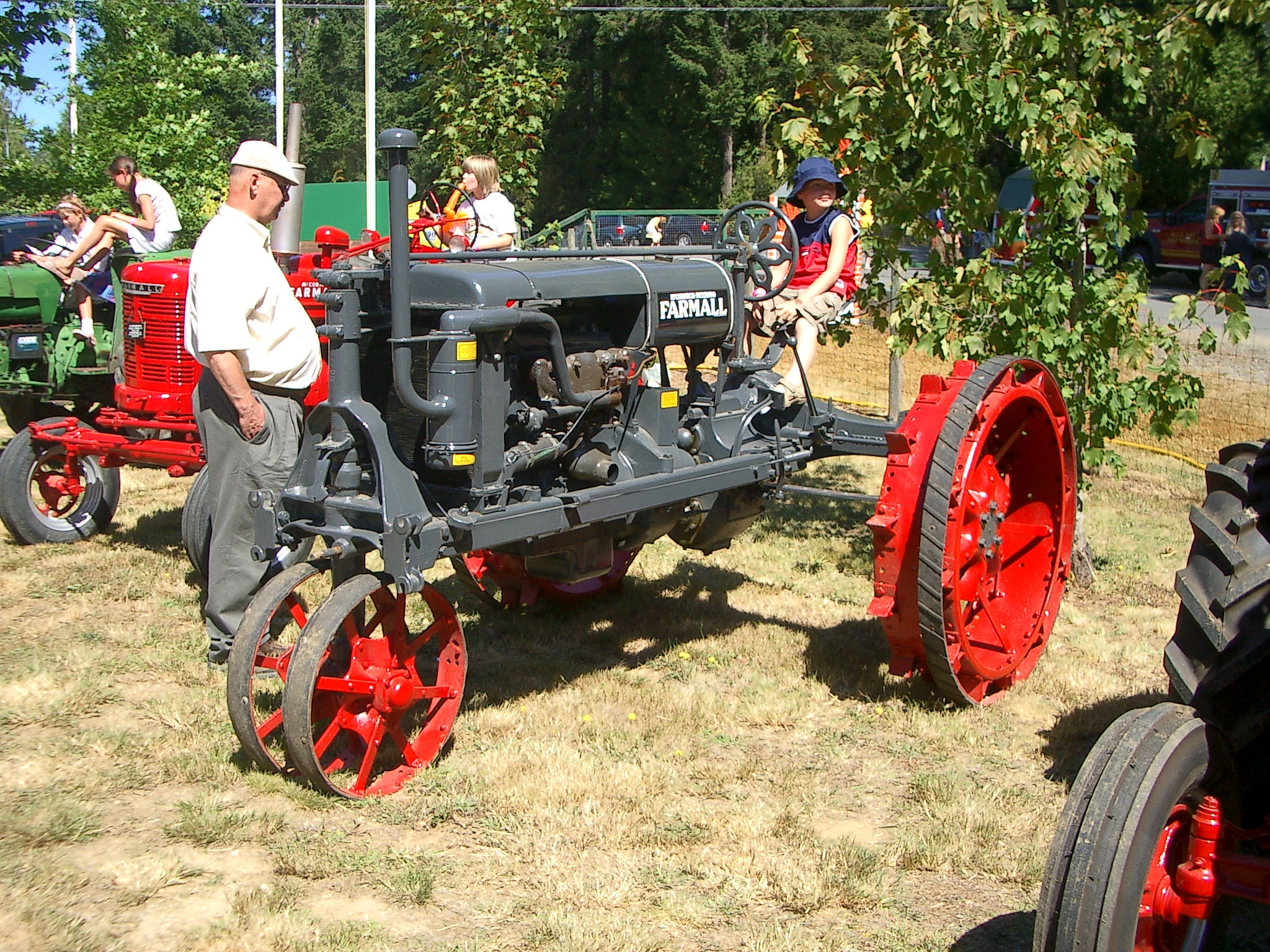
Early Farmall "Regular"

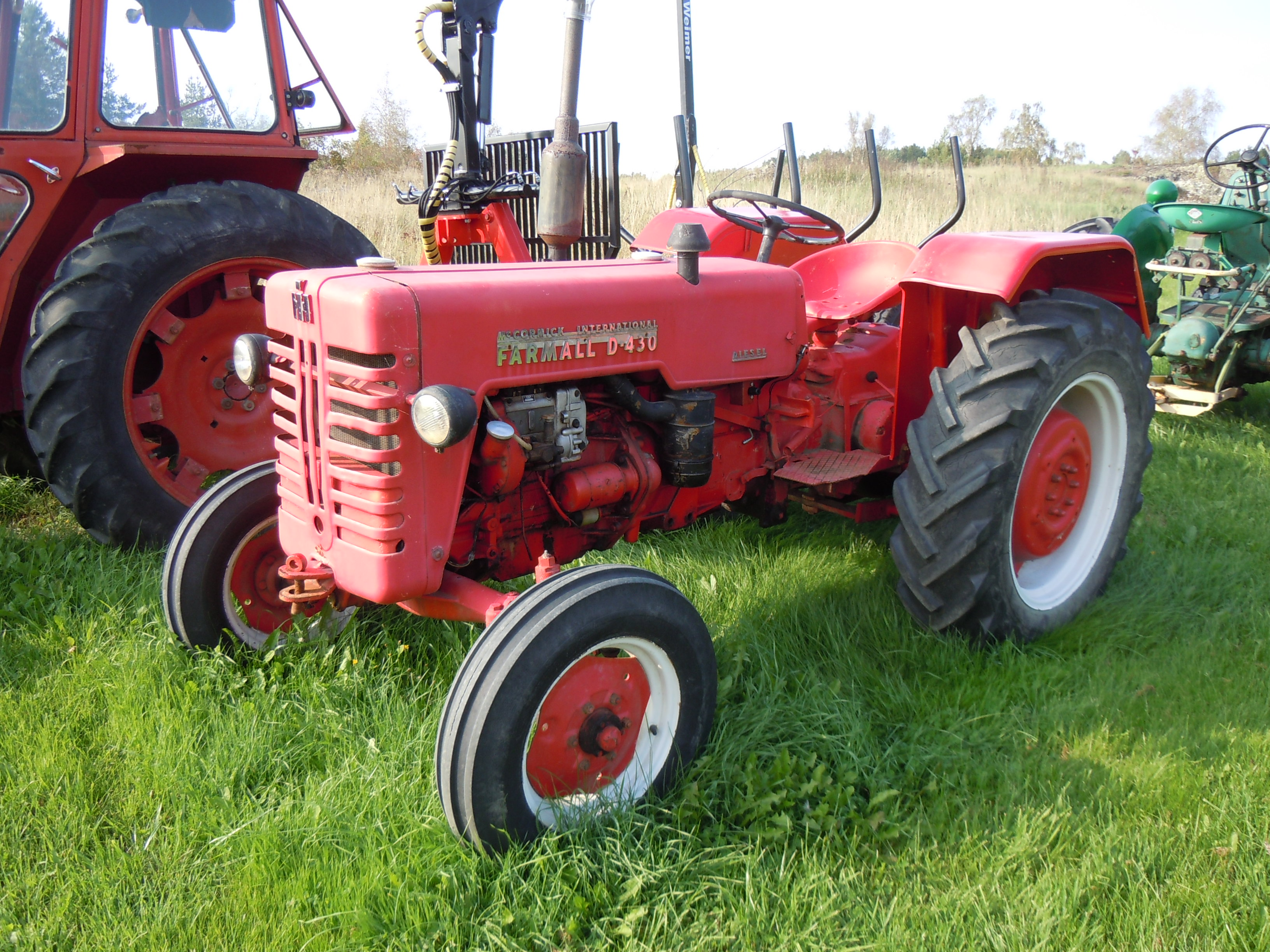
Farmall D-430

Farmall was a model name and later a brand name for tractors manufactured by International Harvester (IH), an American truck, tractor, and construction equipment company. The Farmall name was usually presented as McCormick-Deering Farmall and later McCormick Farmall in the evolving brand architecture of IH.

Farmall was a prominent brand in the 20th-century trend toward the mechanization of agriculture in the US. Its general-purpose machines' origins were in row-crop tractors, a category that they helped establish and in which they long held a large market share. During the decades of Farmall production (1920s to 1980s), most Farmalls were built for row-crop work, but many orchard, fairway, and other variants were also built. Most Farmalls were all-purpose tractors that were affordable for small to medium-sized family farms, and could do enough of the tasks needed on the farm that the need for hired hands was reduced and for working horses or mules eliminated.

The original Farmall is widely viewed as the first tractor to combine a set of traits that would define the row-crop tractor category, although competition in the category came quickly. Although it was not the first tractor to have any one of these traits, it was early in bringing the winning combination to market. The traits included (a) 'tricycle' configuration (a single front wheel or narrowly spaced pair), high ground clearance, quickly adjustable axle track, excellent visibility all around and under the machine, and light weight; (b) sufficient power for plowing and harrowing, and a belt pulley for belt work; and (c) all at low cost, with a familiar brand and an extensive distribution and service network. The first group of traits allowed for more nimble maneuvering and accurate cultivation than most other tractors of the day; additionally, because of the second group, the Farmall could also, like previous tractors, perform all the other duties a farmer would have previously achieved using a team of horses. A tractor could yield lower overall operating costs than horses as long as it was priced right and reliable (and its fuel supply as well). The Farmall, mass-produced with the same low-cost-and-high-value ethos as the Ford Model T or Fordson tractor, could meet that requirement. The Farmall was thus similar to a Fordson in its capabilities and affordability, but with better cultivating ability.

Descriptions of tractors as "general-purpose" and "all-purpose" had been used loosely and interchangeably in the teens and early twenties; but a true all-purpose tractor would be one that not only brought power to plowing, harrowing, and belt work but also obviated the horse team entirely. This latter step is what changed the financial picture to heavily favor the mechanization of agriculture. The Farmall was so successful at total horse replacement that it became a strong-selling product. With the success of the Farmall line, other manufacturers soon introduced similar general- to all-purpose tractors with varying success.

In later decades, the Farmall line continued to be a leading brand of all-purpose tractors. Its bright red color was a distinctive badge. During the 1940s and 1950s, the brand was ubiquitous in North American farming. Various trends in farming after the 1960s—such as the decline of cultivating in favor of herbicidal weed control, and the consolidation of the agricultural sector into larger but fewer farms—ended the era of Farmall manufacturing. However, many Farmalls remain in farming service, and many others are restored and collected by enthusiasts. In these respects, the Farmall era continues. As predicted in the 1980s and 1990s, the growing public understanding of environmental protection, and of sustainability in general, have brought a corollary resurgence of interest in organic farming and local food production. This cultural development has brought a limited but notable revival of cultivating and of the use of equipment such as Farmalls.

== Brand architecture ==
Being an amalgamation, IH, like General Motors, gradually evolved a brand architecture during the first half of the 20th century, when the concept was still new. IH capitalized on farmers' familiarity with its older brands stretching back to individual entrepreneurs of the earliest days of agricultural mechanization (Cyrus McCormick, William Deering), which is why legacy company brands McCormick and Deering were used. The Farmall name itself began as a model name and then evolved to encompass a model line. With the success of the Farmall, other manufacturers soon introduced similar general- to all-purpose tractors with varying success. In their early years, they often included the word "all" in the name of the product. During the first decade of Farmall sales, IH's advertising even had to emphasize the name's correlation to IH, to protect the brand name from genericization. The shift to a bright, distinctive color scheme in 1936 helped to further strengthen the branding effort.

== Models ==
=== Farmall and the F-series ===
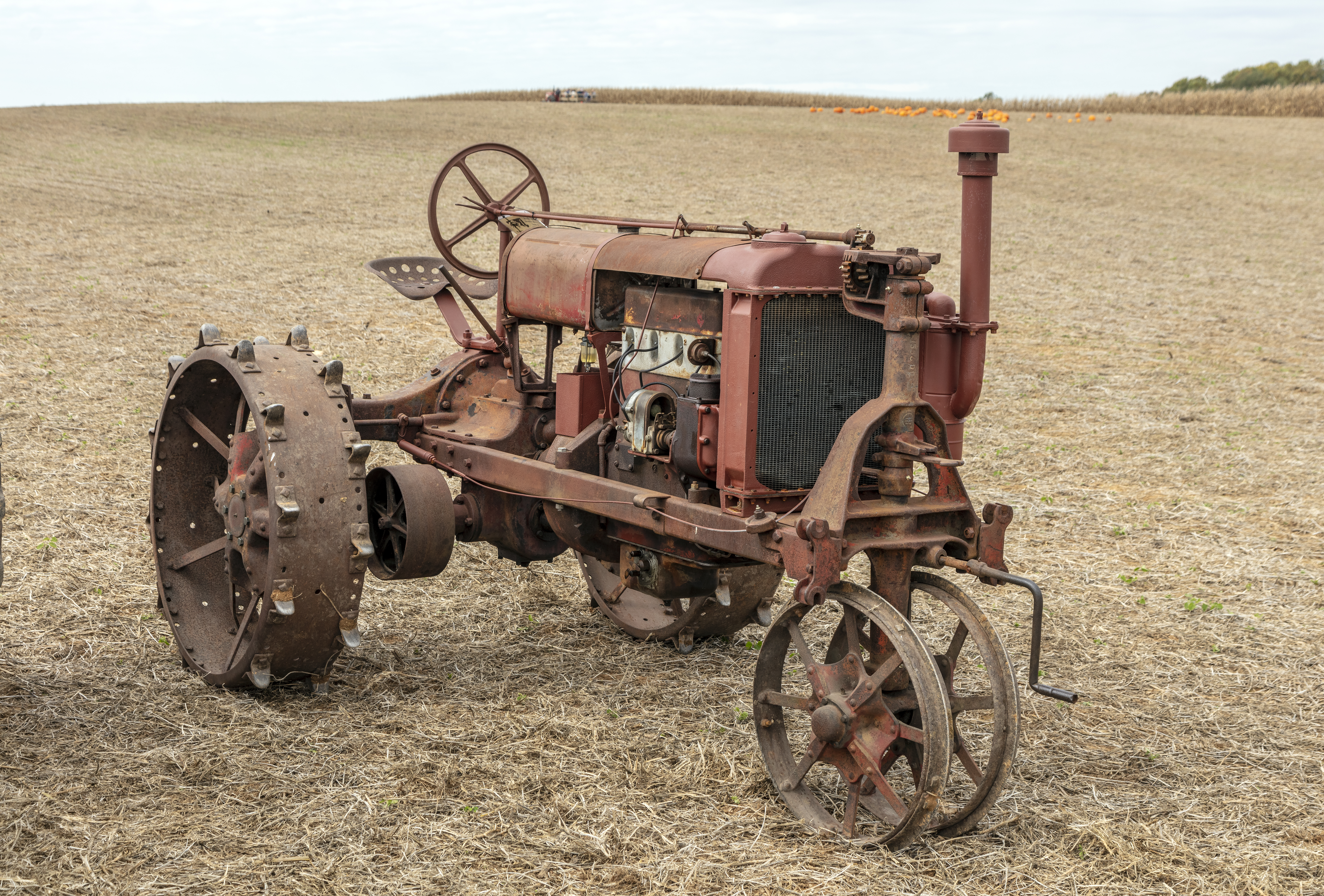
Farmall Regular

The Fordson was the first truly mass-produced, light, affordable tractor, and thus the first to tap the market of small to medium family farms on a large scale. The design allowed for low cost manufacturability, but it struggled with cultivating the rows of young row-crop plants to kill the weeds. IH recognized motorized cultivating as an unmet need in the marketplace. It was also under intense competitive pressure to build a "Fordson beater" soon, lest the Fordson go on to dominate the entire marketplace of agricultural equipment, imperfections or not.

IH's first effort to solve this problem was a motor cultivator, a class of machine that various companies were building and selling in the late 1910s and early 1920s. As the name implies, these were self-propelled cultivators in the simplest sense—little more than a horse implement with a motor added. The IH motor cultivator and another all-purpose tractor, the Moline Plow Company's Universal, both sold several hundred units in the late 1910s. IH's machine was not particularly successful; the Moline Universal was more successful, but its parent company nevertheless faced dire financial straits. Both models were soon discontinued. Many farmers were content (and could afford) to keep one or two horses or mules around to do miscellaneous light work (such as cultivating).

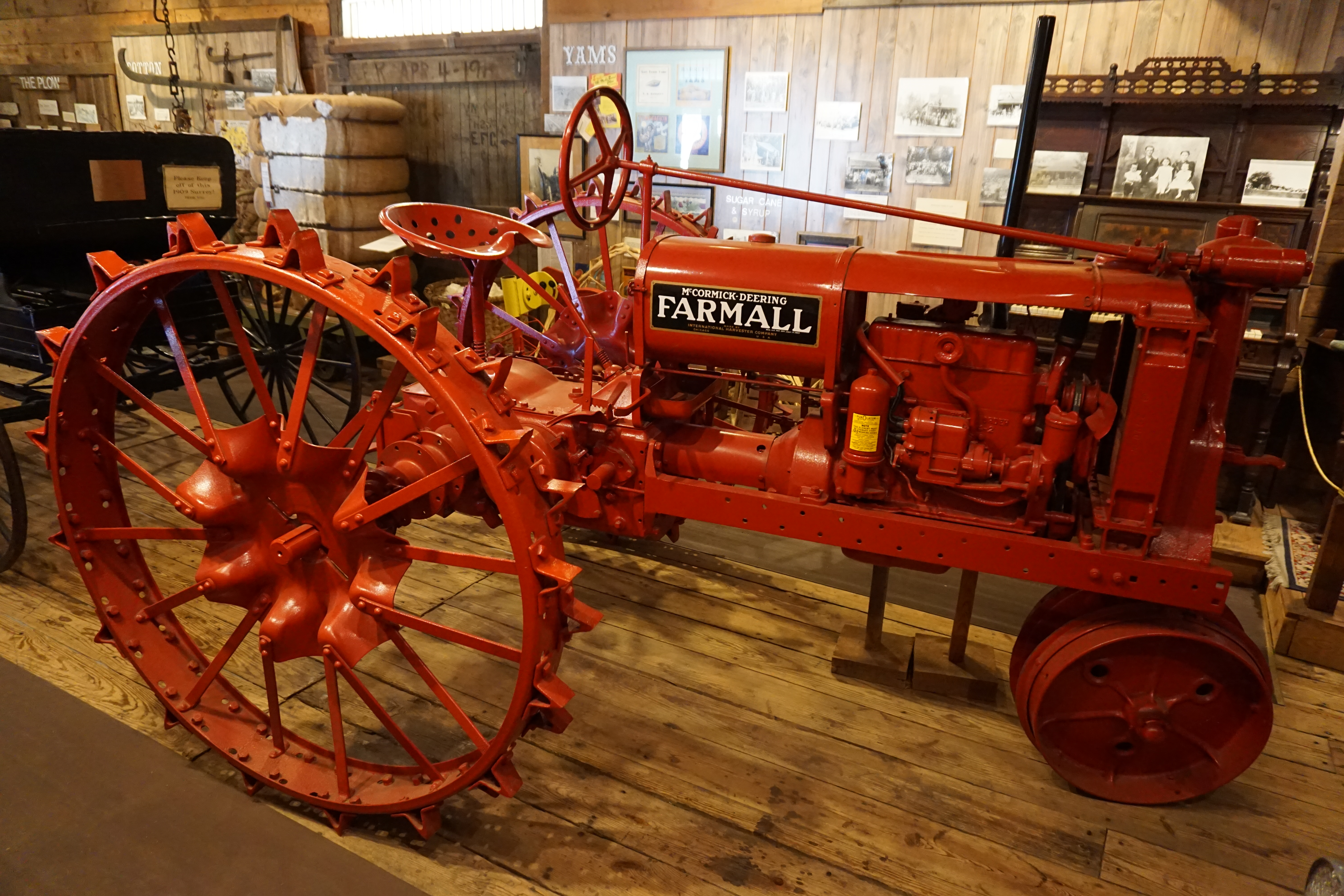
A 1930s McCormick-Deering Farmall (F-14) at the Northeast Texas Rural Heritage Center and Museum in August 2015

Around 1920, as IH's motor cultivator died, a team of IH engineers had evolved the motor cultivator into an all-purpose tractor, replacing the horse in every job including cultivating. By 1923, they settled on a configuration, and their informal name for the project, the "Farmall", was selected as the product's official name. As IH management was concerned that the new high-riding, tricycle design—a rather spindly-looking thing to eyes of the early 1920s—might turn off customers, the Farmall was initially released only in Texas, in order to minimize potential embarrassment if the design proved to be unsuccessful. However, the new tractor did its many jobs well and hence sold well, and by 1926, IH was ready for large-scale production at its new Farmall Works plant in Rock Island, Illinois. Although the Farmall never reached the per-year production numbers of the Fordson during the 1920s, it was the tractor that prevented the Fordson from completely owning the market on small, lightweight, mass-produced, affordable tractors for the small or medium family farm. Its narrow-front tricycle design, high ground clearance to clear crop plants while cultivating (helped by a portal axle [drop gearset]), power take-off (a feature on which IH was an early leader), and standard mounting points for cultivators and other implements on the tractor's frame (a Farmall first) gave it some competitive advantages over the Fordson, especially for row crops, and it became the favorite row-crop tractor of America, outselling all other competitors (such as John Deere's).

In 1931 came the first variation of the original Farmall. The F-30 was bigger, heavier, and more powerful. The original Farmall became known by the retronym Regular. (It may never have been an official name for branding, but it was common among farmers.) In 1932, IH updated the Farmall Regular with a more powerful engine, and renamed it F-20. At this time, IH also added another model, the F-12, a smaller, lighter version of the original. It had no portal axle at the rear, deriving its ride height instead from larger-diameter wheels. Thus, beginning in 1932, the Farmall brand had grown from a single model to a model line, which became known as the F-series. In 1938, the F-12 was replaced by the F-14, almost identical to the F-12 except for an updated steering column and a higher-revving engine (whose higher rev limit, 1650 rpm instead of 1400, made it more powerful at peak output).

==== Color schemes ====
All Farmall tractors were painted a deep blue-grey until mid-1936 (around July through September). The color has often been mistaken for battleship grey, but it was actually bluer. The wheels were most often red. In mid-1936, a decision was made to change the entire tractor (frame, sheet metal, engine, and wheels) to a new color, 'Farmall Red'. It was around this time many tractor manufacturers began using bright, distinctive colors for branding (e.g., Allis-Chalmers orange). A farmer could look out across the fields and see his neighbor's tractor from a great distance and know what make it was; this provided a sort of advertising in the intensely competitive tractor market.

=== The Letter Series and the Golden Years of IH ===
The F-series tractors lasted until 1939. In late 1939, the famous Letter series of Farmall tractors was introduced. The model name letters were A, B, C (which replaced the B in 1948), H, M, and MD(M diesel). IH commissioned an industrial designer, Raymond Loewy, to give the new Farmall general-purpose tractors a sleek new streamlined look. Designed for small-to-medium size American farms, IH's new machines offered a wider variety of capabilities, engines, and equipment options. The smallest of the line, the 'A', utilized the company's Culti-Vision offset engine/front end design, along with a wide front wheel track and dropped axles. The 'B' was the same as the 'A' with the exceptions that it used a narrow, tricycle type front end, and the engine/driveline were placed along the centerline of the tractor. On the larger models, the 'tricycle' type, narrow-spaced front wheel design was retained, as it provided quick steering and a considerable improvement in maneuverability over competing tractors such as the Ford 9N.

IH took care to produce a model for almost every farm and every need. The Farmall A, B, BN and the later C offered compact size; the H and M series provided extra plowing capability and power, while the Model H proved most popular with customers. The 'MD' Farmall offered a diesel engine, which actually started on gasoline, then was switched over to diesel when thoroughly warmed up. Sales took off, and letter-series production did not end until 1954. Overall, the Farmall 'letter' series, well built and affordable, became not only a defining product line in IH history, but an iconic symbol of the prototypical American small-farm tractor. Many machines (especially the two largest models, the H and M) are still in operation on farms today.

In 1947, the smallest tractor in the Farmall line was introduced, the Cub. With a 60 cu. in. four-cylinder engine and a 69-inch wheelbase, the Cub was aimed at small farms such as truck farms, horse farms, and other small acreages that had previously continued to rely on horse-drawn equipment. Like the various John Deere L/LA/LI models, one of the "mechanization-resistant" markets it hoped to penetrate was the small, poor, one-mule family farms of the rural American Deep South. But the Cub also sold to owners of larger farms who required a second tractor. Production of the Cub commenced at the newly acquired Farmall Works-Louisville plant (formerly the wartime Curtiss-Wright Aircraft factory in Louisville, Kentucky) which was expanded, remodeled and re-equipped. Selling for $545.00 in 1947, the Cub proved extremely popular, and the original design continued in production without significant alteration until 1979.

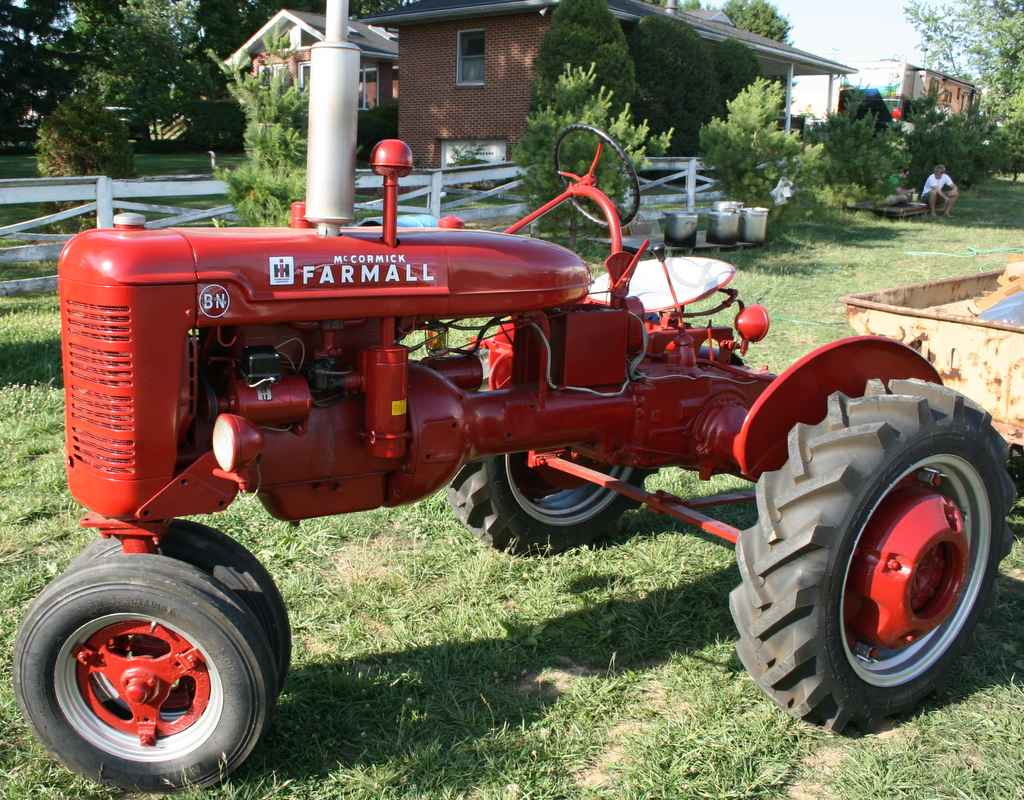
Restored Farmall BN

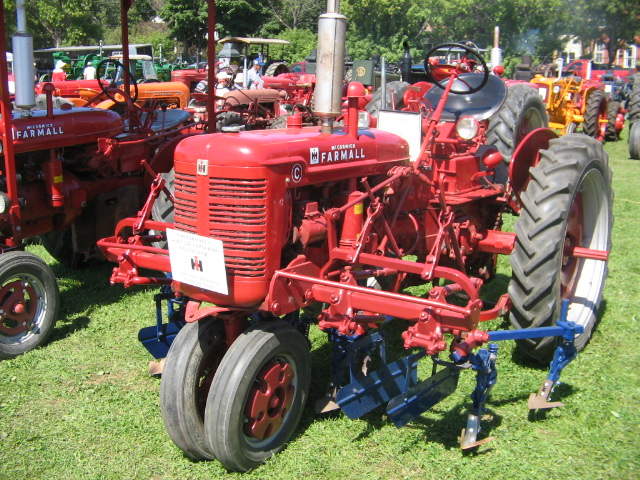
Restored Farmall C with C-254-A two-row cultivator

The Letter series tractors were updated to the Super series beginning in 1947 with the Super A, 1951 for the Super C, 1952 for the Super M and 1953 for the Super H, the B model having been dropped from production and replaced with the C in 1948, which combined the attributes of both models into one tractor, while moving the operator position on top of the tractor in a more traditional layout like the H and M. Though the "Super series" received improvements, these tractors largely followed the design of their predecessors, and like them, were built to last.

=== Letters to Numbers ===
In 1954, the numbered or so-called Hundred series tractors appeared. The Hundred series models used numbers instead of letters to identify the model. The new models were given slightly different looks and a few new features, but were still essentially the famed Letter series tractors. The Farmall Cub continued unchanged, but in 1955 a new 'low-boy' version was added, featuring a shortened 62.5-inch wheelbase and a frame eight inches lower than the regular Cub tractor, which improved the machine's center of gravity. 1956 saw the introduction of the IH Model 350, which offered engines using a variety of commonly available fuels: gasoline, diesel, or LP-gas. The diesel engine version had a direct-start feature, and could be started and run using only diesel fuel. In 1957, IH again gave the tractor lineup an overhaul. Although the basic design was still not changed to any significant degree, new white paint was added to the front grille and sides, new engines were introduced, and new number designations were added. Along with these additions, the Torque Amplifier was added to the Model 300 and all larger models. This provided on-the-go shifting to suit varied needs; the operator was offered ten forward gears and two reverse, instead of the usual five and one. Another addition to these tractors was the independent ("live") power take-off (PTO), which meant that the farmer could run the PTO even when the clutch was disengaged (clutch pedal pushed down). Although the new tractors did improve sales, IH's innate conservatism and reluctance to update their tractor line in response to changing times was becoming apparent.

=== 60 Series Recall and Later Production ===
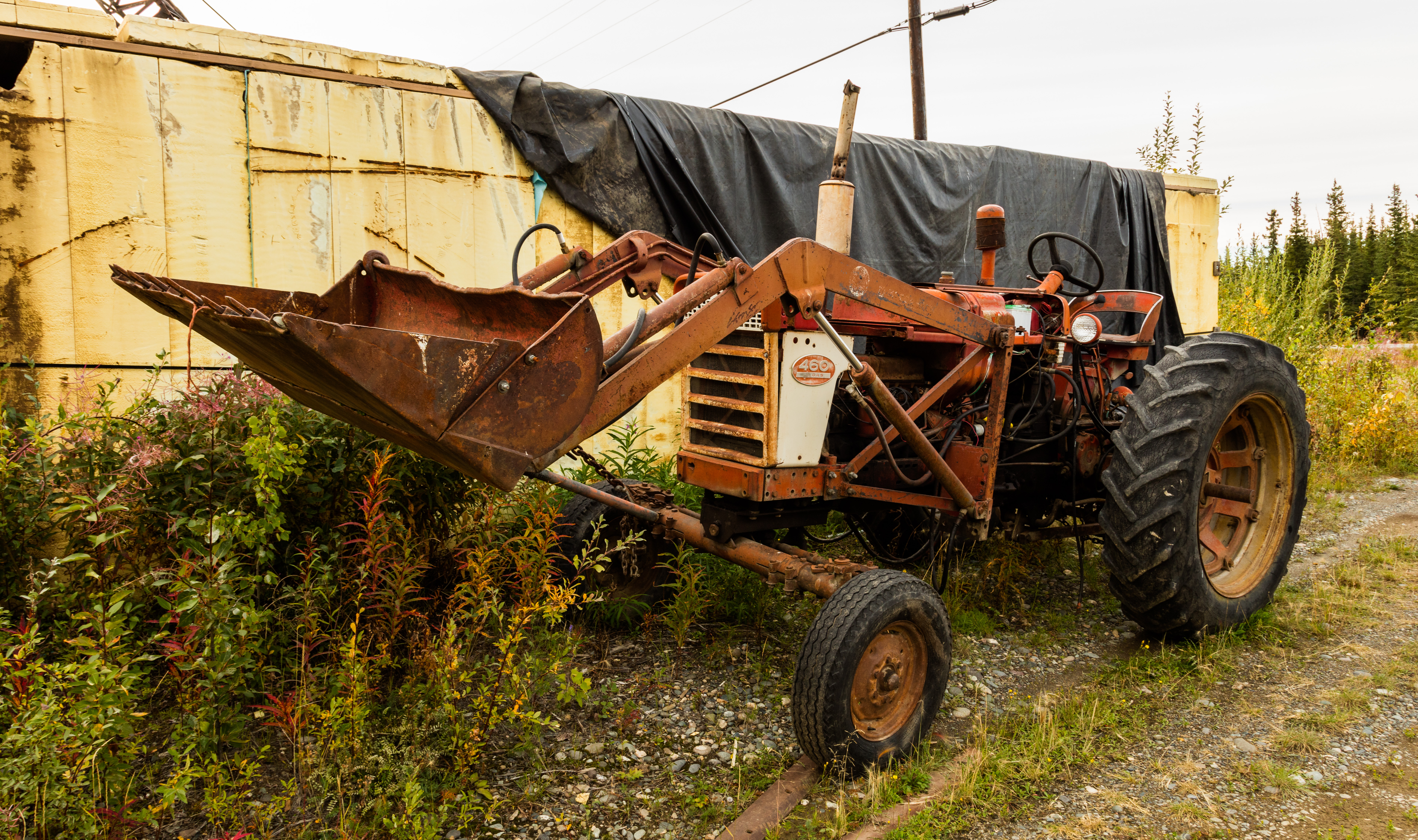
Abandoned Farmall 460 in Tok, Alaska.

At the Hinsdale, Illinois Testing Farm in July 1958, IH entertained over 12,000 dealers from over 25 countries. IH showed off their new 60 series of tractors: including the first of their kind, large six-cylinder 460 and 560 models. But the excitement caused by the new introduction was short-lived. The following June, IH recalled the 460, 560, and 660 tractors after reports of mechanical breakdown in the field. IH, who wanted to be the first big-power tractor manufacturer, had inexplicably failed to substantially enlarge or re-engineer critical drive components on the new six-cylinder tractors. The tractors' final drives, which were essentially made up of unaltered Letter Series components, (the 460 carried over from the model H, the 560 did the same from the model M), failed rapidly under the stress of the more powerful 60 series tractor engines. IH's competitors took advantage of the recall, and IH lost customers in the ensuing months.

Throughout the 1960s and 1970s, IH introduced new tractors and new methods of marketing, but conservative management, an unwieldy corporate organization, and a policy of in-house promotions tended to stifle new ideas and technical innovation at the company. As tractor production was a mainstay of the company, IH realized they would have to modernize and re-engineer their tractor line, lowering costs where possible in order to remain competitive. The massive boilerplate frame and iron housings of the old IH tractors were slowly phased out for lighter, less-expensive components. The streamlined exterior of the earlier tractors was replaced by straighter, more angular lines, updating the look and requiring less-complicated equipment to manufacture. The new machines also became vastly more complex, though easier to operate. Bowing to inevitable sales pressure and bitter price competition from other manufacturers, IH tractors, while still well-made, could no longer be relied upon to last indefinitely.

=== Standard, Industrial, Utility, and Other Models ===
Many Farmall tractor models have one or more mechanically similar models under another IH brand designed for other uses, such as industrial, utility, orchard, or wheatland use. These models have lower ground clearance and a wider front axle. During the Letter series era, these alternate models were sold under the McCormick-Deering brand; later models were badged with the International brand. Some examples include:

- Farmall H—McCormick-Deering W-4 Standard—McCormick-Deering I-4 Industrial
- Farmall 300—International 300 Utility
- Farmall 450—International W450 Wheatland
- Farmall 656—International 656 Row-Crop—International 656 Utility

The International 544 and 656 Row-Crop tractors were a bit of an anomaly until International dropped the Farmall brand, in that they combined some of the customary features of a Farmall (such as an adjustable wheel width) with a utility tractor.

=== End of an era ===
By 1973, IH had officially dropped the 'Farmall' name from its new tractor models, ending an era that began with the first Farmall Regular back in 1924. However, the Farmall nameplate continued to appear on new 1974 and 1975 tractors until the factories exhausted their inventory of obsolete name badges. On February 1, 1974, at 9:00 A.M., the 5,000,000th IH tractor came off the assembly line at the Farmall Works plant in Rock Island, Illinois. IH was the first tractor manufacturer to officially accomplish this production threshold

=== Revival ===
In 2004 Case IH reintroduced the Farmall brand, initially as a line of small utility tractors with less than 55 horsepower (41 kW), intended for small-acreage farms. The brand includes a return to letter designations according to size.

== Model list and power ratings ==
Generally tractors were marketed by the number of 16" width plows they could pull in average soil to indicate their power. Here is a list of plow ratings (see footnotes) for all Farmall tractors produced for North America:

- 1-plow: Cub (12" width or less), A, Super A, B, BN, 100, 130
- 2-plow (14"): F-12, F-14, C, Super C, 140, 200, 230, 240, 404
- 2-plow (16"): Regular, F-20, H, Super H, 300, 340,
- 3-plow: F-30, M, W-6, MD, super MD, Super M, Super M-TA, 350, 400, 450,
- 4 plow and up: W-9, 504, 544, 460, 560, 656, 666, 70 Hydro, 706, 756, 766, 786, 806, 826, 856, 966, 1026, 1066, 100 Hydro, 1206, 1256, 1456, 1466, 1468, 1566, 1568.

Notes:

1. Plow ratings are general plowing abilities dependent upon soil conditions.
2. Depending on the plow width used and the type of soil, a three-plow tractor could handle a four- or five-bottom plow.
3. Engine size was sometimes upgradeable. For example, in the 1950s and 60s it was very popular to upgrade the Super M-TA and 400 model 264 cid engine to 281 cid. An economical cylinder sleeve and piston change was all that was needed. This brought the power level up to that of the 450 model.

There were also some Farmall models unique to the European market: DF-25 (comparable to the H), DGD4 (comparable to the Super H), BMD (British MD) and B-450 (British 450). These models all utilized direct-start diesel engines. Also there is a model BM (British M) with a gasoline engine. This model was built from 1949 until 1954.

== Production information ==
Detailed tables of model names, years, engine displacements, horsepower ratings, production quantities, serial number ranges, and other statistics are available in reference books on the subject.

The Farmall Cub, A, B, 100, 130, and 140 models had the seat offset from the engine, allowing the operator to look directly at the ground under the tractor. This feature was called Culti-Vision because it was created to give the operator an excellent view of the cultivator teeth as they cultivated the vegetable row. (Cultivating in this context refers to breaking up the soil next to the vegetable row, which kills weeds by uprooting them and/or burying their leaves).

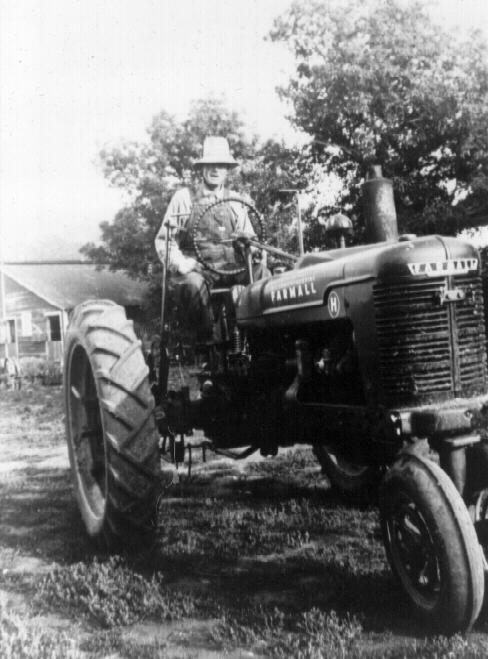
Farmall Model H (c. 1948)

The Farmall A, B, and C used a sliding-gear four-speed transmission, while the larger, more powerful Farmall H and M were fitted with a five-speed transmission. The extra gears of the Farmall tractors helped maximize the engine's power band and road speed, giving a sales advantage over the competition. The A, B, and C all used essentially the same engine but the C ran at a higher RPM and so yielded higher horsepower.

IH Farmall Red became the standard Farmall tractor color after 1936, and was used through the 1970s. The only factory color variations known are Highway Yellow (generally used for municipalities), Demonstrator White, used for dealer demo models during the 1950s, and Demonstrator Gold—actually a red-and-gold color scheme used only during the International Demonstrator program in 1970. Farmalls in other shades are known to exist; these were most likely custom ordered from the factory. For large orders, any color scheme could be accommodated at the factory.

Although IHC's very first diesel-engine tractor was a "Standard" model WD-40 built from 1935 to 1940, the very first "Farmall" diesel tractor was the model MD released in 1941. Like many agricultural and construction/industrial diesel engines of the time, the early IHC diesels were not direct-start; the operator started the engine on gasoline, then manually switched it to diesel fuel after warming up the entire engine. This two-in-one engine design, also known as a "gas-diesel", was unique to IHC agricultural products from 1935 to 1958 and IHC construction/industrial products from 1935 to the early 1960s. Other companies used different yet elaborate means to crank and warm their diesels, such as a pony motor, compressed air, hot bulb, or black powder, among other things. The Farmall Super MD, Super M-TA Diesel, 400 Diesel, and 450 Diesel used the same IHC gasoline-start engine design as the MD, but with larger displacement (more cubic inches). The first Farmall tractor with a direct-start diesel was the model 350, which appeared in 1956. The 350 could also be ordered with a gasoline or LP-gas engine. The 350's direct-start diesel engine was built by Continental Motors. IH subsequently developed their own line of new direct-start diesel engines for the 460 and 560 tractors starting in 1958. Large competitors such as Deere and Caterpillar lagged at least two years behind IH in offering direct-start diesel products.

The Torque Amplifier (TA) was first introduced on the "improved" Super M of 1954, called the Super M-TA. An auxiliary planetary gearset provided a double-reduction (low) gear ratio for each transmission gear (comparable in function to the two-speed rear axle on a commercial truck) that allowed for a quick downshift via hand lever, without using the clutch, to gain torque at the drive wheels. The popular TA attachment was seen upon most of the new 300 and 400 Farmalls that first appeared in 1955, and on the 350 and 450 produced 1956–1958, and on later models through the 1960s. Although the TA was appreciated on the Farmalls, IH also offered the TAs on the "Standard", "Utility", and "Industrial" tractor lines as well.

The Fast Hitch was IH's answer to the three-point hitch developed years earlier by Harry Ferguson, and featured on Ford-Ferguson tractors. The Fast Hitch was first offered as an option on the Super C. Fast Hitch was then an option on the 100, 200, 300, and 400 and some later models. However, even the Fast Hitch had three incompatible variants (100—single prong; 200—two small prongs; 300/400—two large prongs). IH discontinued the Fast Hitch in the 1960s after the three-point hitch was standardized and adopted by all manufacturers. There are kits available from a variety of sources that will either convert a Fast Hitch to a three-point, or add a three-point hitch to tractors that originally only had a fixed drawbar.

International Harvester was one of the earliest manufacturers to provide a stepless transmission in a row crop tractor. Introduced first as an option on 656 and 544 tractors, the hydrostatic transmission would become a defining feature of the 70 Hydro and 100 Hydro models.

=== Production facts ===
- From 1924 until 1963, Farmalls were the largest selling row crop tractors.
- The Farmall H, produced from 1939 to 1954 (the last two model years it was sold as the Super H, but was the same basic tractor with a slightly larger engine and disc type brakes), became the number two selling tractor model of all time in North America with 420,011 sold (the last 28,784 being Super Hs). Only the Ford 8n (due primarily to Ford's much greater economies of scale, the fact it sold for a significantly lower price ($1404 in 1952 versus $2000 for the H the same year), and to its exclusive Ferguson Three Point Hitch system) was a slightly better seller, at 524,076 sold. The Farmall H, however, was and still is the number one selling row crop tractor of all time.
- The Farmall Cub (later renamed International Cub) remained in production the longest (from 1947 until 1979) with minor updates in engineering and styling.
- Culti-Vision proved to be IH's longest-lived engineering feature, staying in production from 1939 to 1979.
- A few clever mechanics have created "home-brew" IH models, the so-called Super H-TA (Super H with Torque Amplifier), Super HD (Super H Diesel), and F-16 tractors. However, IH itself never manufactured such models.
- The Farmall Works plant in Rock Island, Illinois first opened in 1926. The last IH tractor, a Model 5488, was built there on May 14, 1985. International's Agriculture Equipment Division was sold to Tenneco the prior year, in 1984.
- Case IH has revived the Farmall brand on some of their latest tractors.
- The Hydro 1066 had less drawbar power than the gear-drive 1066 due to hydrostatic slippage, leading to the creation of the Hydro 100.

== See also ==
- Farmall Cub
- McCormick-Deering W series tractors
- Farmall Australia
- Farmall Britain
- Farmall France
- Farmall Germany
- International Harvester
- List of former tractor manufacturers
- List of International Harvester vehicles

== Bibliography ==
- Fay, Guy (2000), "Farmall Tractors in the 1950s", Enthusiast Color Series, Osceola, WI, USA: MBI, ISBN 0-7603-0762-8.
- Fay, Guy; Kraushaar, A. (2003), Original Farmall Hundred Series, 1954-1958, Osceola, WI, USA: MBI, ISBN 0-7603-0856-X.
- Klancher, Lee (1995), Farmall Tractors, MBI, ISBN 978-0-87938-986-4.
- Klancher, Lee (2004), "Farmall", Enthusiast Color Series, Osceola, WI, USA: MBI, ISBN 0-7603-1846-8.
- Klancher, Lee (2008), The Farmall Dynasty (1st ed.), Austin, TX, USA: Octane Press, ISBN 978-0-9821733-0-5.
- Leffingwell, Randy (1999a), International Harvester Tractors, Osceola, WI, USA: MBI, ISBN 0-7603-0423-8.
- Leffingwell, Randy (1999b), America's Classic Farm Tractors, Osceola, WI, USA: MBI, ISBN 978-0-7603-0822-6.
- McCoy, Stephen (November 2004), "Letter to the Editor: No, not a Farmall F-16", Farm Collector
- Pripps, Robert N.; Morland, Andrew (photographer) (1993), Farmall Tractors: History of International McCormick-Deering Farmall Tractors, Farm Tractor Color History Series, Osceola, WI, USA: MBI, ISBN 978-0-87938-763-1.
- Pripps, Robert N. (1995), International Harvester Tractor Buyer's Guide, Osceola, WI, USA: Motorbooks International, ISBN 0-7603-0011-9.
- Pripps, Robert N. (2004), The Field Guide to Farmall Tractors, St Paul, MN, USA: Voyageur Press, ISBN 0-89658-558-1.
- Updike, Kenneth (2000), International Harvester Tractors, 1955–1985, Osceola, WI, USA: MBI, ISBN 0-7603-0682-6.
- Updike, Kenneth (2008), "Classic Farmall Tractors: History, Models, Variations & Specifications, 1922-1975", Tractor Legacy Series (1st ed.), Voyageur Press, ISBN 978-0-7603-3195-8.
