= Farmall C =

Row crop tractor

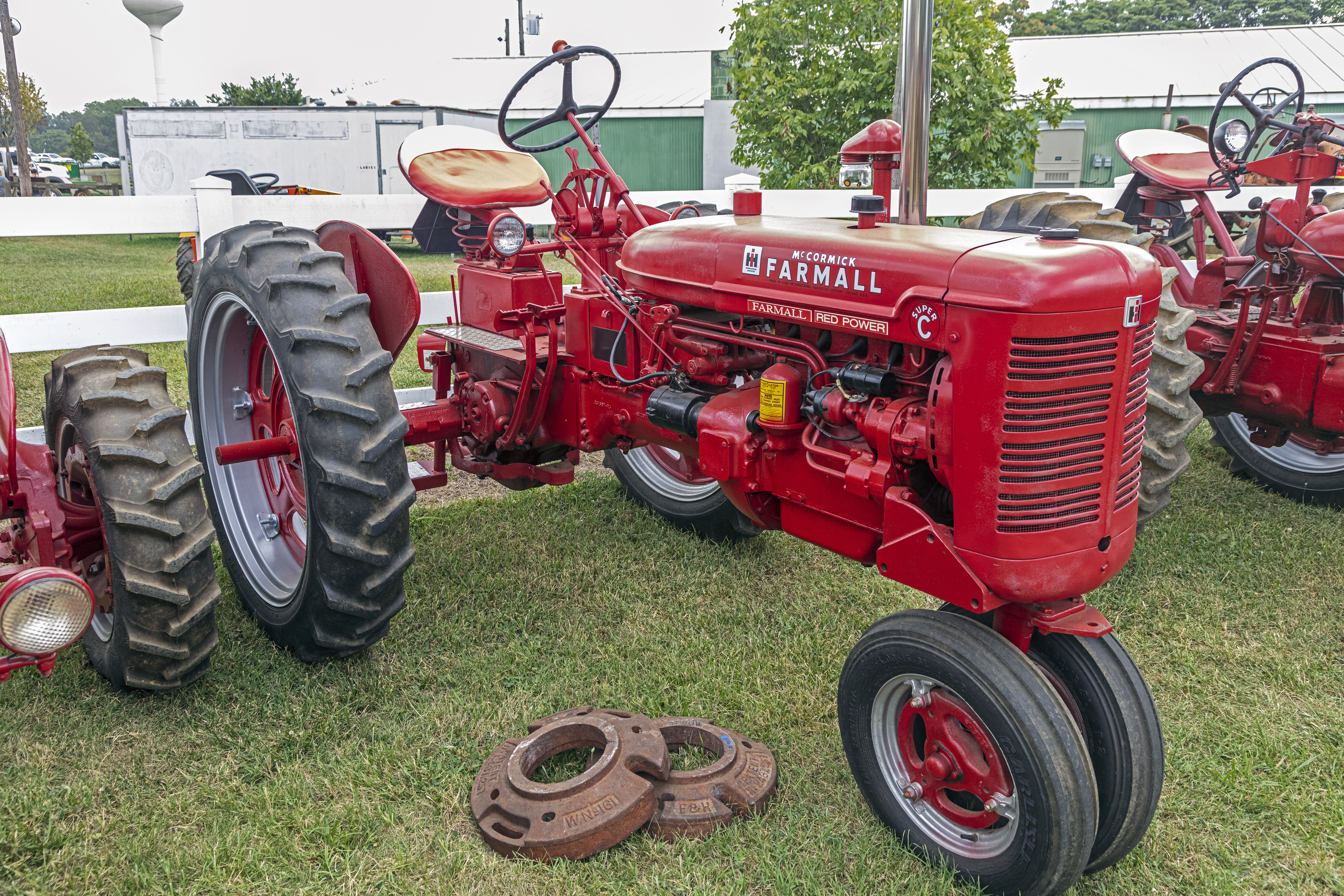
- Farmall Super C
- Type: Row-crop agricultural tractor
- Manufacturer: International Harvester
- Production: 1948-1954
- Weight: 4,409 pounds (2,000 kg)
- Propulsion: Rear wheels
- Engine model: International Harvester C113
- Gross power: 23 horsepower (17 kW)
- PTO power: 18.57 horsepower (13.85 kW) (belt)
- Drawbar power: 21.12 horsepower (15.75 kW)
- Drawbar pull: 2,902 pounds (1,316 kg)
- NTTL test: 395
- Preceded by: Farmall B
- Succeeded by: Super C, followed by Farmall 200

The Farmall C is a small two-plow row crop tractor produced by International Harvester under the Farmall brand from 1948 to 1951. The C was developed from the Farmall B as a slightly larger, more versatile implement, raising and moving the B's offset operator seat to the centerline and increasing the wheel size to allow a straight, widely-adjustable rear axle. The C kept the International Harvester C123 engine that had been used in the Super A model. The tractor was heavier and more robust, and featured hydraulic capability from the beginning. The C was incrementally updated with new model numbers as the Super C, 200, 230 and 240, but remained essentially the same machine. The closely related successors to the C were produced until 1962.

== Description and production ==
Styled by Raymond Loewy, it was one of International Harvester's "letter series", with 103,800 produced over the 4-year run. The C was rated for two 14-inch (36 cm) plows.

The C was designated the Farmall E while it was in development. Work started in September 1939. Introduction was delayed by World War II until 1948, when it was designated the Farmall C.

The C is equipped with an International Harvester inline overhead-valve 4-cylinder engine with 123-cubic-inch (2,020-cubic-centimetre) displacement. The sliding-gear transmission has five total gears: four forward and one reverse. The Farmall C replaced the Farmall B, doing away with the offset operator's position and the B's geared portal axle in favor of a straight, splined rear axle with a much greater range of adjustment. Larger wheels provided the necessary underside clearance. The C kept the B's tricycle configuration, with closely spaced front wheels under the engine housing.

From 1951 to 1954, International Harvester produced the Farmall Super C, with the a 26 horsepower (19 kW) 123-cubic-inch (2,020-cubic-centimetre) IH C123 engine. About 112,000 Super C tractors were produced. Super Cs were available with either narrow or wide front wheels. They were replaced by the Farmall 200.

== Farmall 200 ==
The Farmall 200 was a rebadged Super C with minor improvements, replacing the Super C in 1954, with production into 1956. It was marketed as an ideal tractor for farms with 80 acres (32 ha) to 120 acres (49 ha). The 200 introduced an option called "Hydra-Creeper", where the transmission could be powered by a hydrostatic drive, allowing for a "creep mode" at about 0.25 miles per hour (0.40 km/h) from transplanting operations.

== Farmall 230 ==
The Farmall 230 was produced from 1956 to 1958. Compared to the 200, the 230 had styling changes and an increase in compression ratio. About 12,000 230s were produced, selling for about $2,200.

== Farmall 240 ==
The Farmall 240 replaced the 230 in 1958. It was restyled to match the new squared-off look of larger tractors in the Farmall line, and the operator position was adjusted. The 240 was produced until 1962. The IH 240 was produced as the utility version. About 4,200 240s were produced, at a selling price of about $2,300 to $3,000.

== Comparable product ==
The John Deere 420 was a comparable offering to the C and the 230. The farmall model c sold about 12,000 and sold for $2,300 to $3,000
