= Larson F-12 Baby =

American 1960s single seat sports biplane

F-12 Baby

General information
- Type: Single seat light biplane
- National origin: United States
- Manufacturer: Larson Aero Development
- Number built: 1

History
- First flight: 1961

The Larson F-12 Baby was a single engine, single seat sports biplane built in the US in the early 1960s.

== Design and development ==
The Baby was a single bay biplane with stagger. The wings were wooden structures with two spars and fabric covering; the upper wing had 1° of dihedral and the lower one 3°. There were ailerons on both wings, with aluminum frames and again fabric covered. The fuselage and empennage were fabric covered, welded steel structures. It had fixed conventional landing gear with rubber sprung main legs, aluminum wheels with brakes and a sprung tailwheel.

The Baby was powered by an 85 hp (63 kW) Continental C85 air-cooled flat four, its fuel tank in the fuselage behind the engine and in front of the single seat, open cockpit.

== Specifications ==
Data from Jane's All the World's Aircraft 1960-61

General characteristics

- Crew: One
- Length: 17 ft 0 in (5.18 m)
- Wingspan: 17 ft 0 in (5.18 m) upper or lower
- Height: 5 ft 6 in (1.68 m)
- Wing area: 73 sq ft (6.8 m^{2})
- Aspect ratio: about 7 on upper wing, 6 on lower
- Airfoil: NACA 4412 modified
- Empty weight: 500 lb (227 kg) weights estimated
- Gross weight: 800 lb (363 kg)
- Fuel capacity: 12 US gal (10.0 imp gal; 45 L)
- Powerplant: 1 × Continental C85 air-cooled flat four, 85 hp (63 kW)
- Propellers: 2-bladed McCauley aluminium, fixed pitch

Performance

- Maximum speed: 130 mph (210 km/h, 110 kn) all performance figures estimates
- Cruise speed: 110 mph (180 km/h, 96 kn)
- Rate of climb: 2,000 ft/min (10 m/s)
