= Farmall F-12 =

Row crop tractor

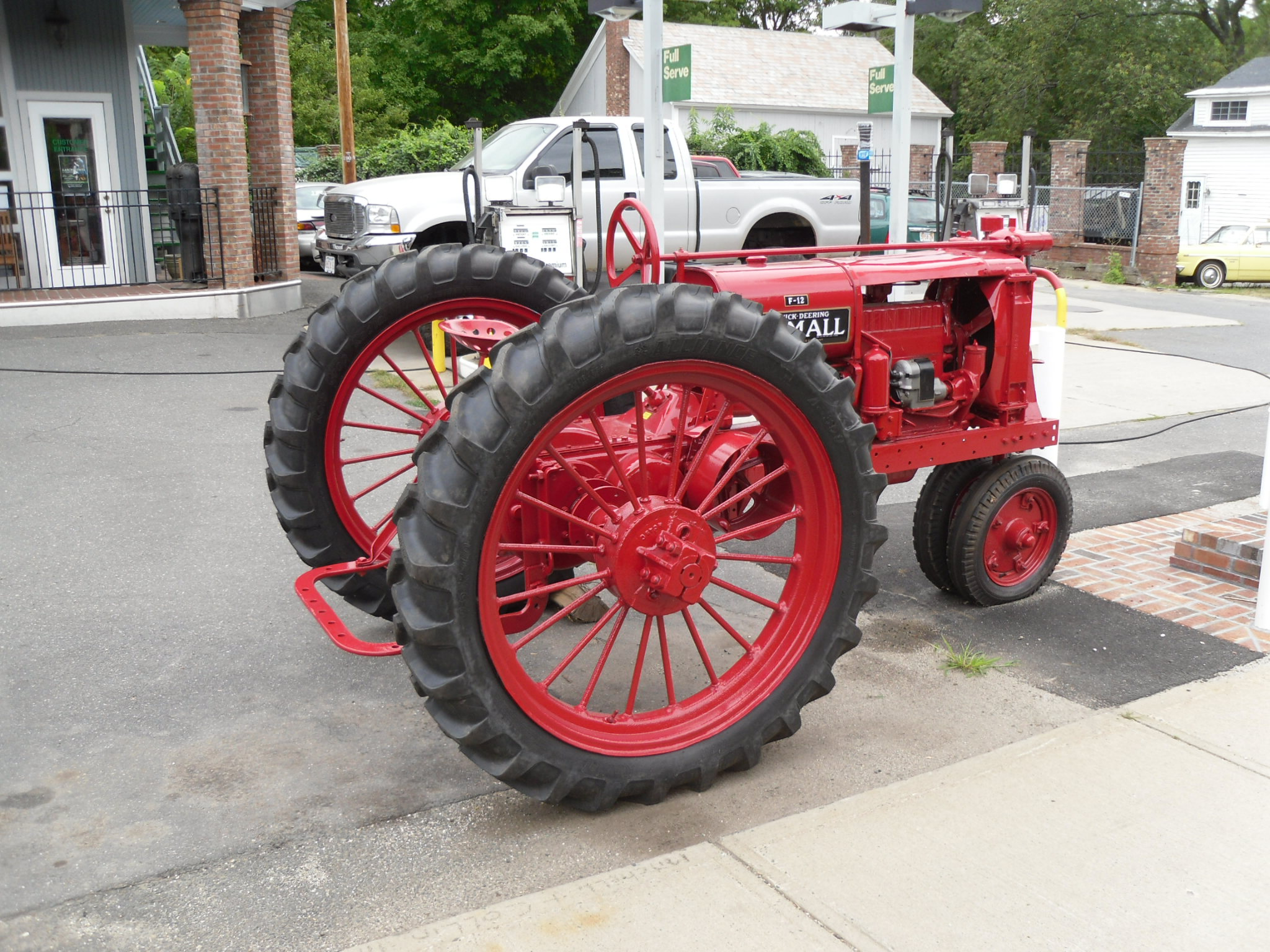
- Farmall F-12
- Type: Row-crop agricultural tractor
- Manufacturer: International Harvester
- Production: 1932-1939
- Length: 125.5 inches (319 cm)
- Width: 72.3 inches (184 cm)
- Height: 62.5 inches (159 cm) to steering wheel)
- Weight: 2,700 pounds (1,200 kg)
- Propulsion: Rear wheels
- Gross power: 14 horsepower (10 kW)
- PTO power: 16.20 horsepower (12.08 kW) (belt)
- Drawbar power: 12.31 horsepower (9.18 kW)
- Drawbar pull: 1,870 pounds (850 kg)
- NTTL test: 212
- Succeeded by: Farmall F-14, later Farmall A and B

The Farmall F-12 is a small two-plow row crop tractor produced by International Harvester under the Farmall brand from 1932 to 1938, with approximately 123,000 produced. An improved model, the two-plow F-14, was produced beginning in 1938 and ending in 1939, when the Farmall letter series tractors were introduced.

== Description and production ==
The F-12 was a smaller, modernized version of the earlier Farmall Regular, developed from a prototype designated the F-10. To reduce mechanical complexity and to improve transmission efficiency, the Regular's portal axle rear wheel arrangement was changed to a straight axle, with larger wheels to provide ground clearance. This had the additional benefit of allowing a broader range of wheel adjustment to accommodate different row-crop row widths. Versions were available for gasoline or distillate. A wide front axle was available as an option. F-12s were delivered with steel wheels, with optional rubber tires. Early-year F-12s were painted gray, like the Regular. Beginning in 1936 the F-12 was painted bright red, to increase visibility. This quickly became a trademark of the Farmall line. The F-12 cost about $600 when introduced, rising to about $700.

Early W-12s were equipped with a 14 horsepower (10 kW) 113-cubic-inch (1,850-cubic-centimetre) engine, which was superseded by a similar engine produced in house by International Harvester, The sliding-gear transmission offered three gears. More than 120,000 F-12s were produced through the model's production run.

== Variants ==
A McCormick W-12 version with a wide front axle was produced as well. The F-12-G4 was produced in an International Harvester plant in Neuss, Germany. I-12 industrial tractors, and O-12 orchard tractors with fairings and underside exhaust routing were also produced. The Fairway 12 was produced for golf course and mowing use. All of these variants except the Fairway had rubber tires.

== Farmall F-14 ==
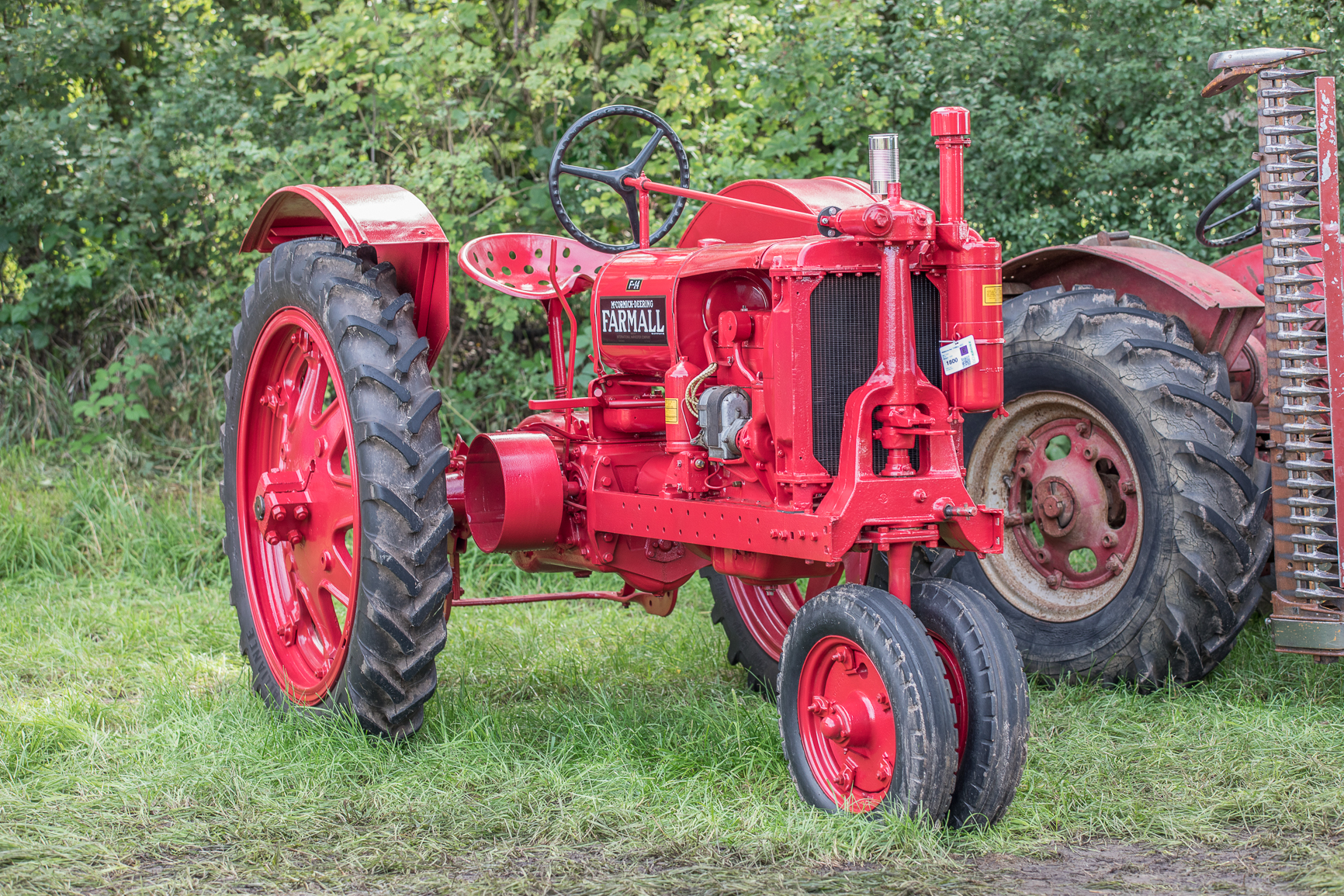
Farmall F-14

The Farmall F-14 replaced the F-12 in 1938, with a 16 horsepower (12 kW) engine of the same displacement, running at higher RPMs, which allowed a two-plow rating. A hydraulic lift was a popular option on the F-14. O-14, W-14 and I-14 models were produced as well. The F-14 was produced in 1938 and 1939, with a run of about 32,000 units. The Farmall A and B replaced the F-14 in the Farmall small tractor line-up beginning in 1939. Cost was between $800 and $850.

== Comparable product ==
The John Deere H was a comparable product from John Deere.
