= Farmall Cub =

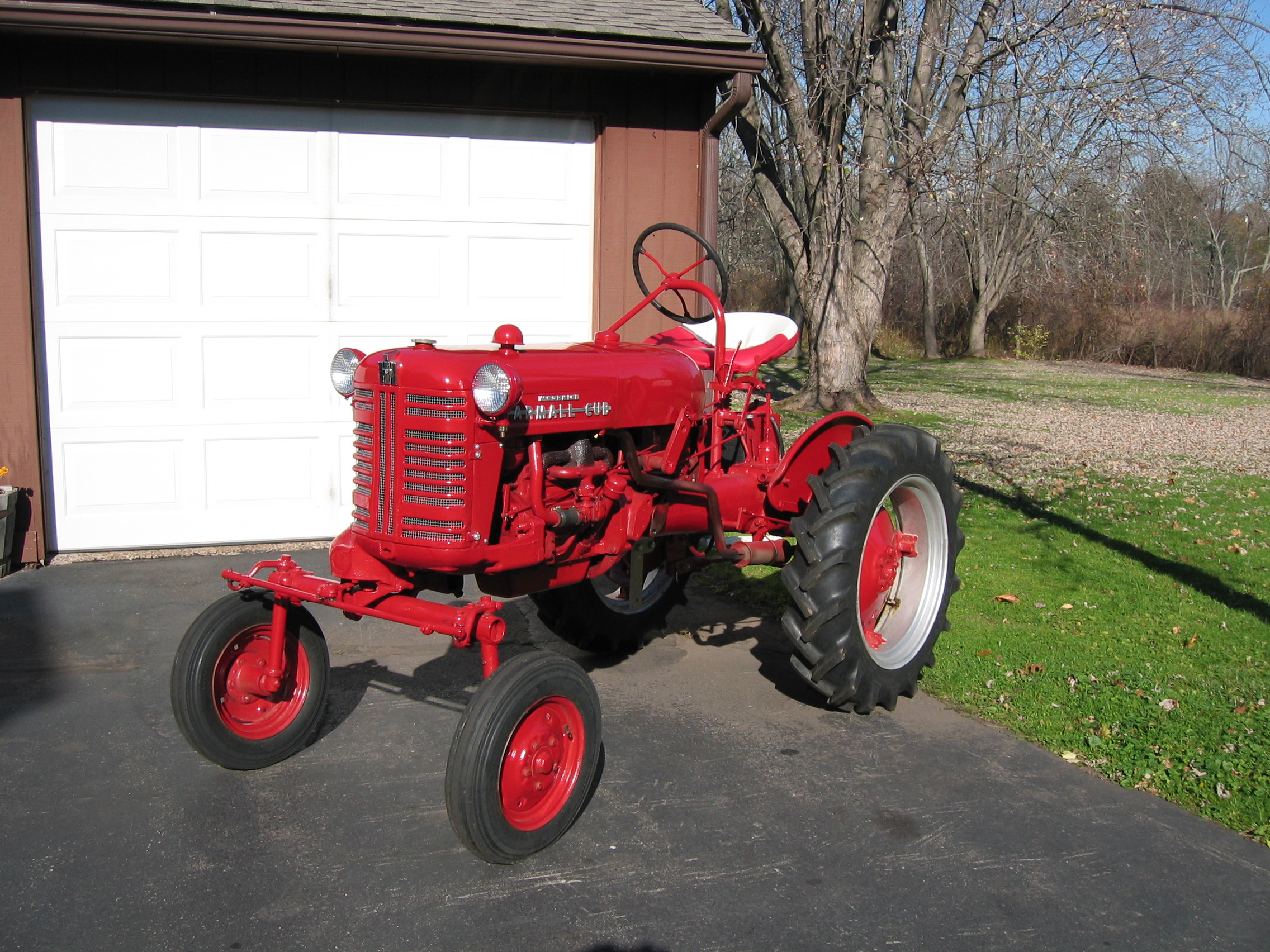

Overview
- Manufacturer: International Harvester
- Production: 1947 - 1979

Powertrain
- Transmission: 3 - Speed Manual

Dimensions
- Wheelbase: 69.25 In (1,758.95 mm)
- Curb weight: 1,477 - 1,877 lb (670 - 851.39 kg)

The Farmall Cub or International Cub (or simply "Cub" as it is widely known) was the smallest tractor manufactured by International Harvester (IH) under either the McCormick-Deering, Farmall, or International names from 1947 through 1979 in Louisville, Kentucky.

== Description ==
The Cub was initially designated the Farmall X, and was to use a two-cylinder engine. Development started in July, 1943, changing to a four-cylinder engine. A prototype was built by December 1944. In September 1945, it became the Farmall Cub.

The two major variations of the Cub were the "Standard Cub" and the "Lo-Boy Cub" (or "Cub Lo-Boy"). They are recognized by their distinctive IH Red or Federal Yellow color schemes. In the late 1950s, sales of the Farmall Cub shifted from agricultural purpose to industrial purpose. IH capitalized on the shift, and the standard color for the Cub Lo-Boy and Cub changed from the familiar IH Red to Federal Yellow in 1960, with IH Red as an option. In 1963, International Harvester changed the grille of these tractors to a flat-grille style and dropped the Farmall name in favor of International. In 1981, the last production run of Cubs were painted IH Red.

The Demonstrator White color was used in 1950 on Cubs between serial numbers 99356 to 106516. These White Demo Cubs were used in the IH special demonstration program by dealers to highlight the abilities of the tractor. The tractors were painted white with red wheel centers. Dealers were expected to repaint these tractors back to IH Red before sale. However, some of these demonstrators were sold without being repainted.

The market of this little tractor was the small-acreage farmer, and it was designed by Farmall engineers in the years following World War II to replace a horse or mule for farming purposes. The tractor was offset to the left, while the driver's seat and steering wheel were on the right. This concept was called "CultiVision", resulting in a clear view while working the fields.

The Cub sat on a 69 1/4-inch (1,760 mm) wheelbase, using a 4-cylinder, C-60 gasoline L-head engine, that consisted of a 2 5/8-inch (67 mm) bore by 2 3/4-inch (70 mm) stroke, with a displacement of 59.5 cubic inches (0.981 L). At 1600 rpm, early versions of the C-60 engine produced 9.25 horsepower (6.90 kW) on the belt and 8 horsepower (6.0 kW) at the drawbar. Starting in the 1960s, Cub engines steadily increased power with higher rated RPM's, peaking at 15 horsepower (11 kW) for the International Cub and 154 Lo-Boy by 1975, and 18 horsepower (13 kW) for the 185 and 184 Lo-Boys.

The Cub Lo-Boy, introduced in 1955, was a lowered version of the Standard Cub. The rear axle housings were rotated, lowering the tractor about 7–8 inches (180–200 mm). Also, the front axle extensions were lowered, and the tractor wheelbase was shortened to 62 1/2 inches (1,590 mm). These modifications lowered the center of gravity, and decreased the turning radius, which made the tractor more maneuverable improving the mowing capability of the Cub.

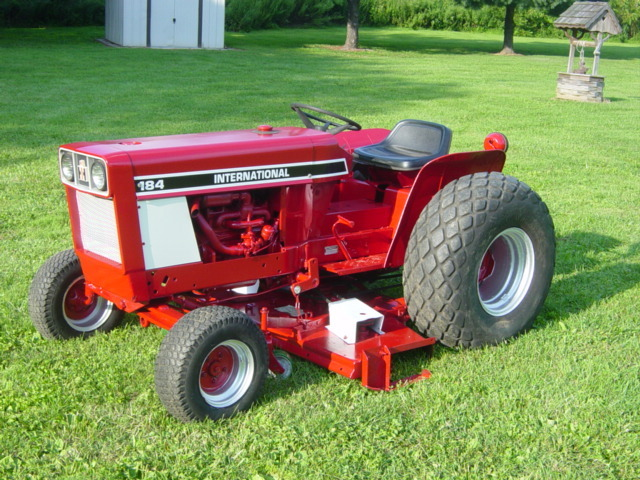
1977 International 184 Lo-Boy

The Lo-Boy version of the Cub was replaced in 1969 by the 154 Lo-Boy, which had a body style similar to the smaller Cub Cadet garden tractor. Also made were 185 and 184 Lo-Boy models, which were increased power variations of the 154 Lo-Boy. These numbered versions received many upgrades and improvements when compared with the Cub Lo-Boy.

International Harvester also built Cubs for Europe at a factory in St. Dizier, France starting in 1955. The tractors were affectionately dubbed the French Cub. The French version became the Super Cub with a more powerful engine in 1958 until production ended in 1964. IH may have also unofficially built some Super Cubs at their factory in Louisville.

IH ended production of the Cub at the Louisville, Kentucky plant in 1981. Over 245,000 Cubs were manufactured between 1947 and 1981, making the Cub arguably the most popular small tractor in history. Due to their versatility many Cub tractors remain in use on small farms into the 21st century.

== Comparable products ==
Comparable products include the Allis-Chalmers G and the Massey Pony.

== See also ==
- International Harvester
- Farmall tractor
- Cub Cadet
- List of International Harvester vehicles
- List of former tractor manufacturers
