= Lester F. Larsen Tractor Museum =

Tractor museum at the University of Nebraska–Lincoln

Lester F. Larsen Tractor Test and Power Museum

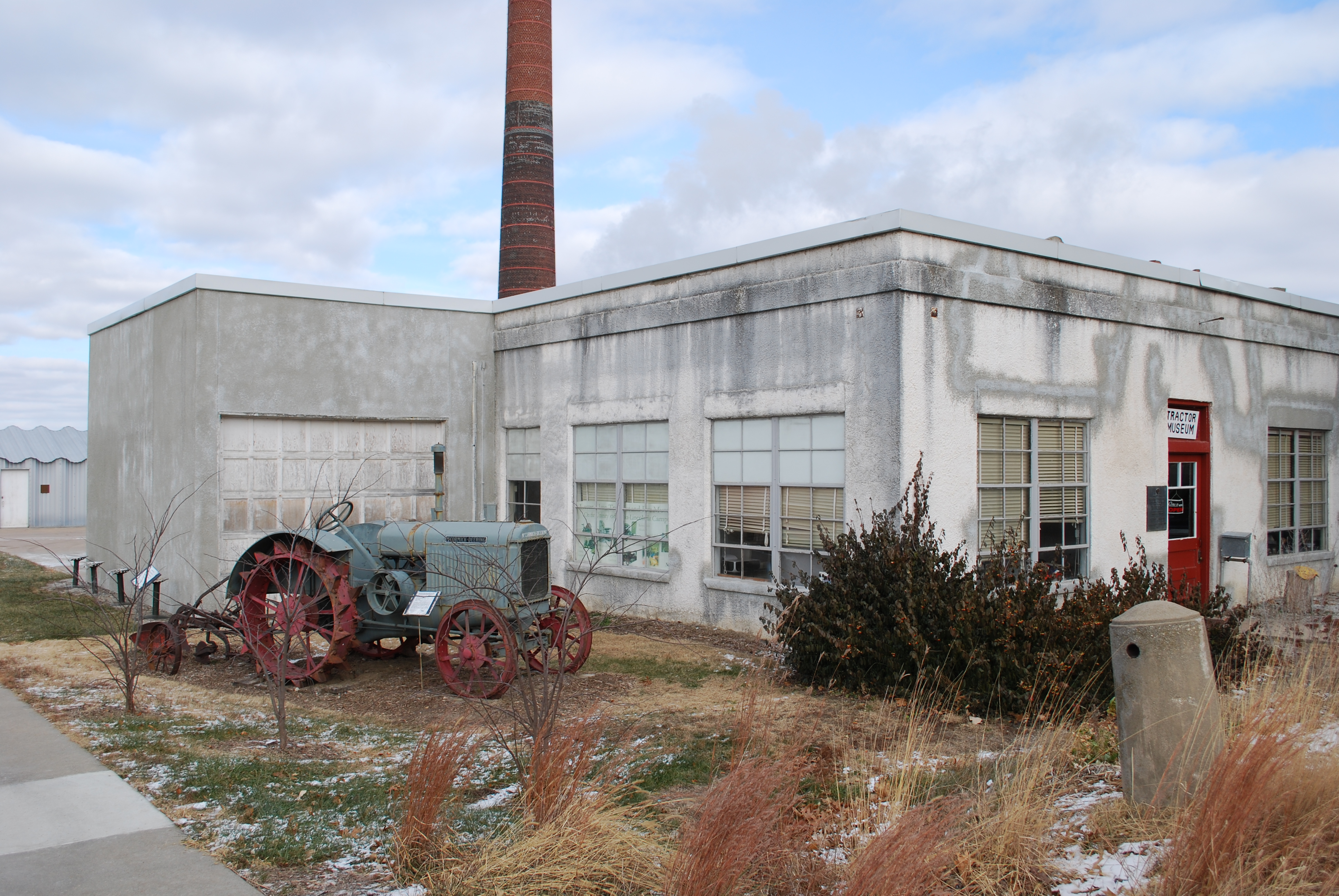
- Established: 1980
- Location: 3310 Holdrege Street; Lincoln, Nebraska
- Coordinates: 40°49′56″N 96°40′07″W
- Type: Agriculture museum
- Website: tractormuseum.unl.edu

The Lester F. Larsen Tractor Test and Power Museum is a museum dedicated to preserving and documenting the history of Nebraska's tractor test law, operated by the University of Nebraska–Lincoln in Lincoln, Nebraska. The Nebraska Tractor Test Law, passed in 1919 and administered by the university, requires performance testing on every tractor with forty horsepower or more sold in the state. The facility, initially established as the Nebraska Tractor Test Laboratory, was renamed for longtime chief engineer Lester F. Larsen when it was converted into a museum in 1998. It is the only tractor testing museum and the only complete tractor test laboratory in the world.

== History ==
The Nebraska tractor testing law traces its roots to 1919 when Wilmot Crozier, a farmer and state representative from Osceola, bought a Ford 8-16 tractor. Crozier noted the 8-16 could pull only one plow despite advertised claims it could pull three simultaneously. After seeking an explanation from the manufacturer, Crozier discovered the 8-16 was not made by the Ford Motor Company, but rather by the Ford Tractor Company, an unaffiliated company using an employee with the Ford surname to promote its tractors. Crozier drafted a bill requiring the validation of claims made by tractor manufacturers, later stating that "after operating, or attempting to operate, two excuses for tractors, I finally invested my money in a machine that would really do what the company said it would. Then I began wondering if there wasn't some way to induce all tractor companies to tell the truth."

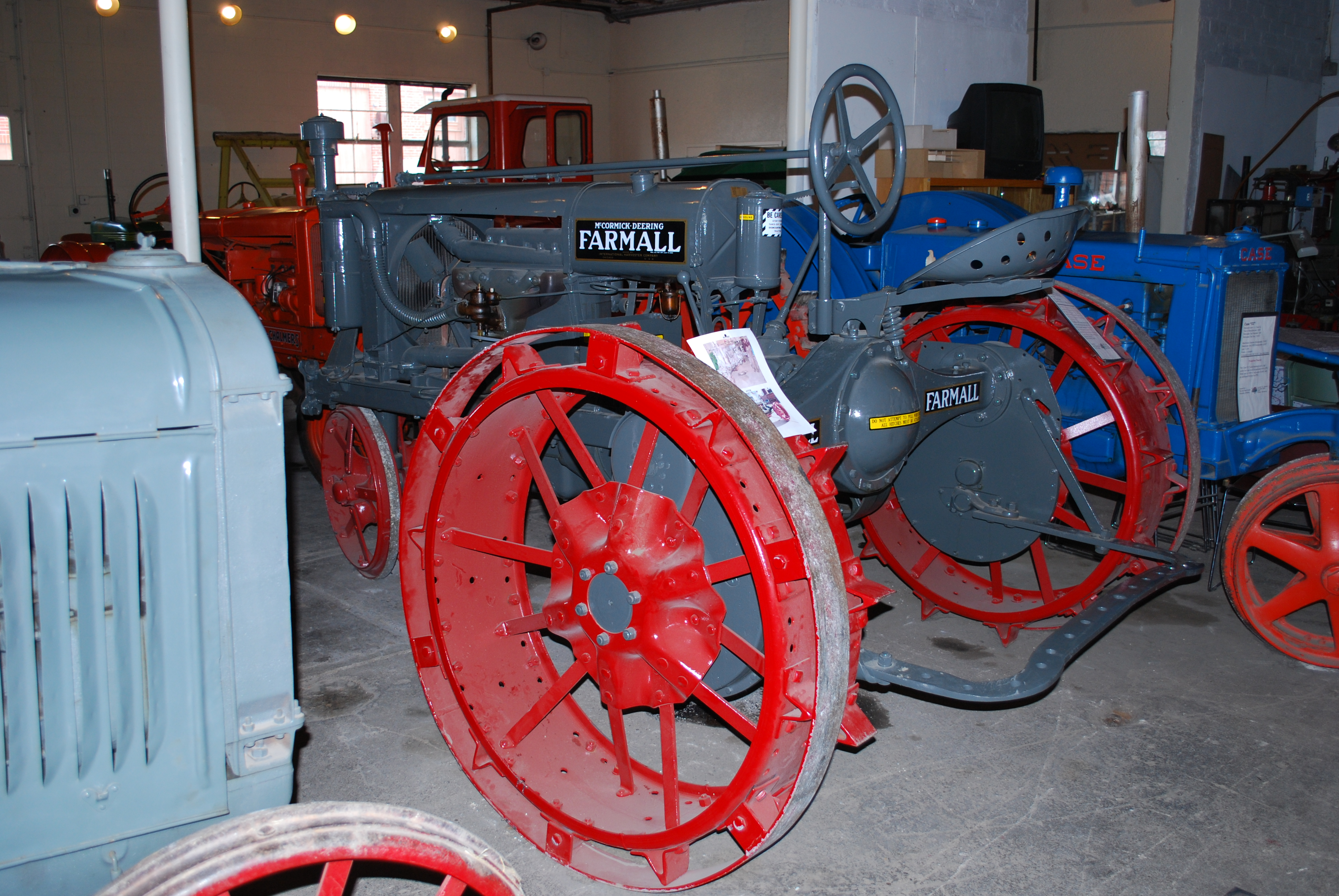
A McCormick-Deering Farmall tractor at the museum

With the backing of Crozier and state senator Charles J. Warner, the Nebraska Tractor Test Law was passed in 1919, House Roll 85. The legislature established the Nebraska Tractor Test Laboratory on Farm Campus (now East Campus) of the University of Nebraska–Lincoln, the first tractor testing facility in the world. Construction was completed at the corner of 35th and Fair Streets; the Waterloo Boy Model N became the first tractor to successfully complete the test in 1920. The facility was expanded in 1948.

In 1980, tractor testing was moved to an adjacent building and the original facility was declared a historic landmark by the American Society of Agricultural Engineers (now the American Society of Agricultural and Biological Engineers). It was converted into a museum in 1998 and dedicated as the Lester F. Larsen Tractor Test and Power Museum in honor of the laboratory's chief engineer from 1946 to 1975. The museum is primarily funded privately and is part of the University of Nebraska State Museum system.

The University of Nebraska–Lincoln continues to test tractors to ensure reliability standards. The test track is located directly west of the museum and the testing facility is to the northwest. It has two 800-foot straightaways (though only 500 feet are used during testing), used to validate the tractor's drawbar horsepower. Inside the test laboratory, a dynamometer is used to determine the "belt horsepower" of the tractor. The laboratory's original Sprague dynamometer is housed in the museum.

== Collection ==
The museum's collection consists of forty antique and unique tractors, including the Heider Model C, Moline Universal Model D, Fordson 1920, Allis-Chalmers Model G, Ford 8N, and John Deere 820. The museum is also home to the Waterloo Model N (the first tractor to pass the test), and the Ford 8-16 (the unreliable tractor which led to the creation of Nebraska's tractor law).
