= Fordson =

Ford tractor and truck brand

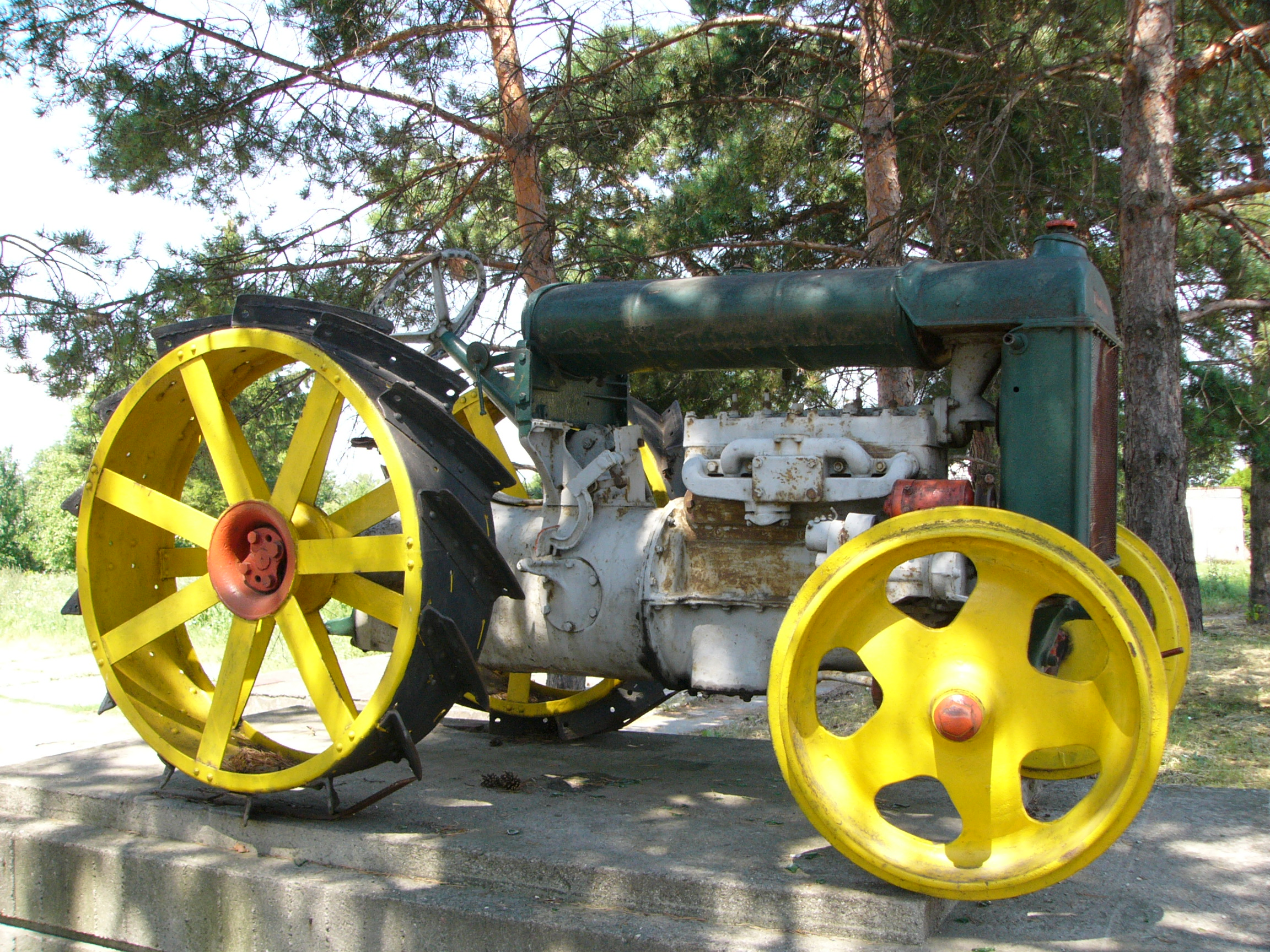
- Monument to Fordson model F The Czech Republic

Overview
- Manufacturer: Henry Ford & Son Ltd; Ford Motor Company; Ford Motor Company Ltd
- Production: 1917–1964
- Assembly: United States (1917–1928); Cork, Ireland (1919–1984 and 1928–1933); Dagenham, UK (1933–1964)

Body and chassis
- Class: Agricultural Tractor

Powertrain
- Engine: 4-cylinder inline
- Transmission: 3-speed manual gearbox

Chronology
- Successor: Ford N-series tractor

Fordson was a brand name of tractors and trucks. It was used on a range of mass-produced general-purpose tractors manufactured by Henry Ford & Son Inc from 1917 to 1920, by Ford Motor Company (U.S.) and Ford Motor Company Ltd (U.K.) from 1920 to 1928, and by Ford Motor Company Ltd (U.K.) alone from 1929 to 1964. The latter (Ford of Britain) also later built trucks and vans under the Fordson brand.

After 1964, the Fordson name was dropped and all Ford tractors were simply badged as Fords in both the UK and the US.

== Production years ==
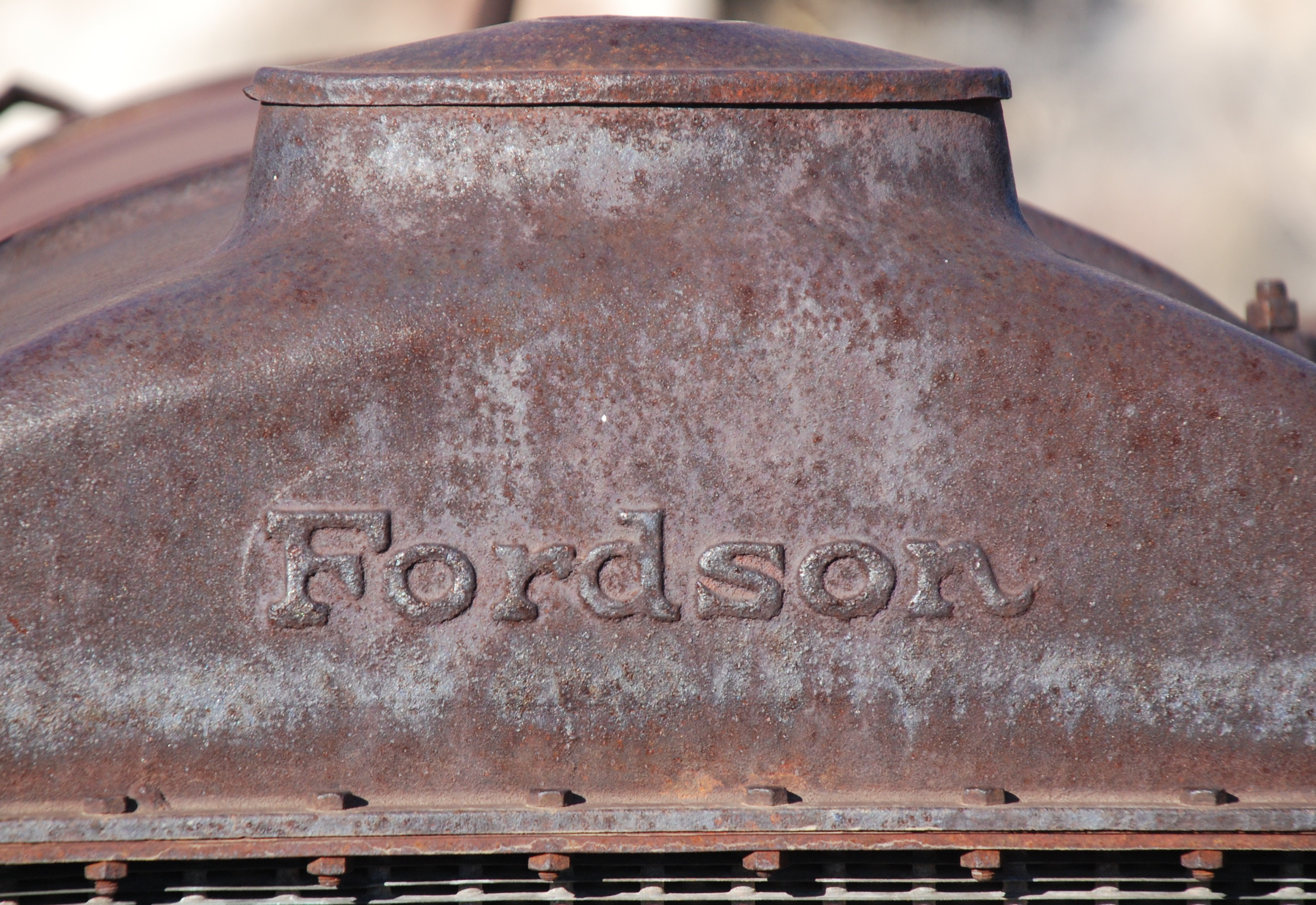
Fordson logo

Between 1917 and 1922, the Fordson design for tractors was somewhat like the Ford Model T was for automobiles—it captured the public's imagination and widely popularized the machine, with a reliable design, a low price affordable for workers and farmers, a widespread dealership network, and a production capacity for large numbers. Just as the Ford Model T helped the public to appreciate how soon cars and trucks might replace most horses in transport, the Fordson helped people to appreciate how soon tractors might replace most horses in farming (advancing the mechanization of agriculture). As with cars, Ford never had the market to itself but it dominated the market for a time; for tractors, from roughly 1917 to 1925, and again from 1946 to 1953. Ford was the only automotive firm to sell cars, trucks, and tractors simultaneously from 1917 to 1928.

For a decade between 1928 and 1939, Ford of the U.S. left the tractor business. During that decade, Ford of Britain continued to build Fordsons and to develop new variants, which it exported widely. In 1939 Ford of the U.S. reentered the tractor market with an all-new model, this time with the Ford brand. Ford of Britain continued to use the Fordson brand until 1964.

Fordson production took place in the U.S. (1917–1928); Cork, Ireland (1919–1923 and 1928–1933); and at Dagenham, Essex, England (1933–1964). Tens of thousands of Fordsons, most from the U.S. and some from Ireland, were exported to the Soviet Union from 1920 to 1927. Soviet Fordson clones were also built at Leningrad (now Saint Petersburg) from 1924 and at Stalingrad (now Volgograd) from 1930.

== Tractors ==
=== Ford experimental tractor development, 1907–1916 ===
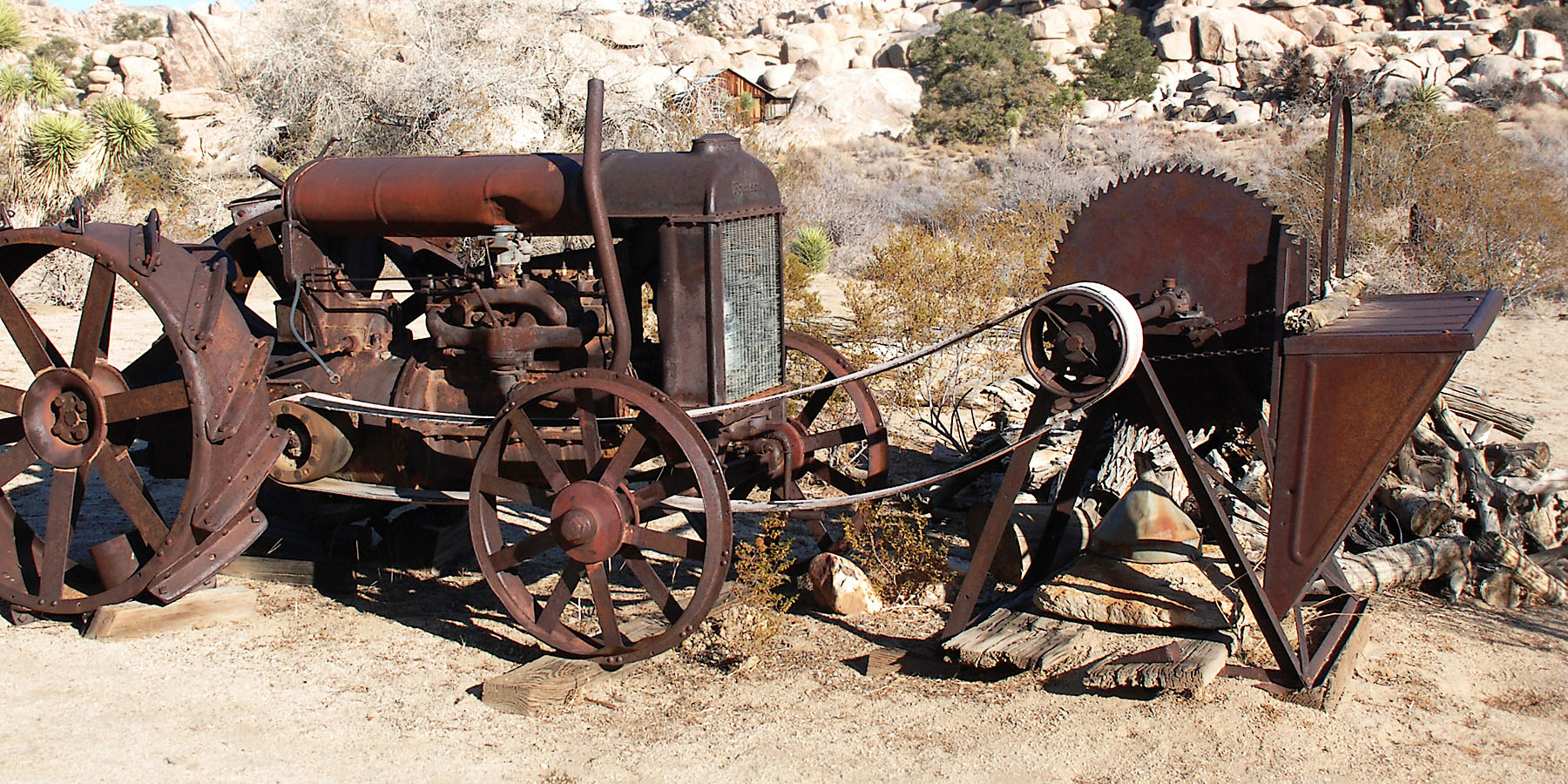
Fordson tractor attached to a circular saw

Henry Ford grew up in an extended family of farmers in Wayne County a few miles from Detroit, Michigan in the late 19th century. At the time, farm work was extremely arduous, because, on the typical farm, virtually nothing could get done without manual labor or animal labor as the motive power. As his interest in automobiles grew, he also expressed a desire to "lift the burden of farming from flesh and blood and place it on steel and motors." In the early 20th century, he began to build experimental tractors from automobile components. Four years after founding the Ford Motor Company in 1903, Ford finished his first experimental tractor in 1907 on Woodward Avenue in Detroit, referring to it as the "Automobile Plow". Approximately 600 gasoline-powered tractors were in use on American farms in 1908. Fordson tractor design was headed by Eugene Farkas and József Galamb, who had previously been involved in the design of the legendary Ford Model T.

Traction engines had been around for a while, but they were large, heavy, expensive machines suited to prairie grain farming more than to small family farms in other regions. In the early 1910s, North America and Europe were hungry for small, inexpensive tractors, and many people seized on the Model T as a platform with which to create them. The idea of an auto-like tractor, made using auto-like parts and methods or by conversion from autos, was ripe. American engineer, inventor, and businessman Henry Ford built experimental tractors from automobile components during the early 20th century and launched a prototype known as the Model B in August 1915. Further prototypes, with a dedicated tractor design, followed in 1916. With World War I raging in Europe, the first regular-production Henry Ford & Son tractors were exported to the U.K. in 1917 to expand British agriculture. In 1918, exports continued, the tractors began to be labeled as Fordsons, and U.S. domestic sales began. Sales boomed in 1918 and 1919.

Henry Ford experimented with auto-plows and heavier tractors. In August 1915, at a plowing demonstration in Fremont, Nebraska, he introduced a newly designed tractor known as the Model B. It used a 16 hp (12 kW), two-cylinder, horizontally opposed engine, a spur gear transmission and three wheels—two front drivers and one rear steerer. The Model B was never produced but did gain enough publicity to let the world know Ford was interested in developing a tractor.

Knowing there was a demand for a Ford-built tractor, in 1915, a group of entrepreneurs in Minneapolis organized The Ford Tractor Company, paying a company clerk surnamed Ford for the use of his name, to get sales and attention from the confusion of this "Ford" company with the well-known Ford Motor Company. The company built and sold some tractors, but anticipated a settlement with Henry Ford for permission to use their already-trademarked name. However, Ford thwarted them by using another name.

=== Fordson origins, Model F, and Model N ===
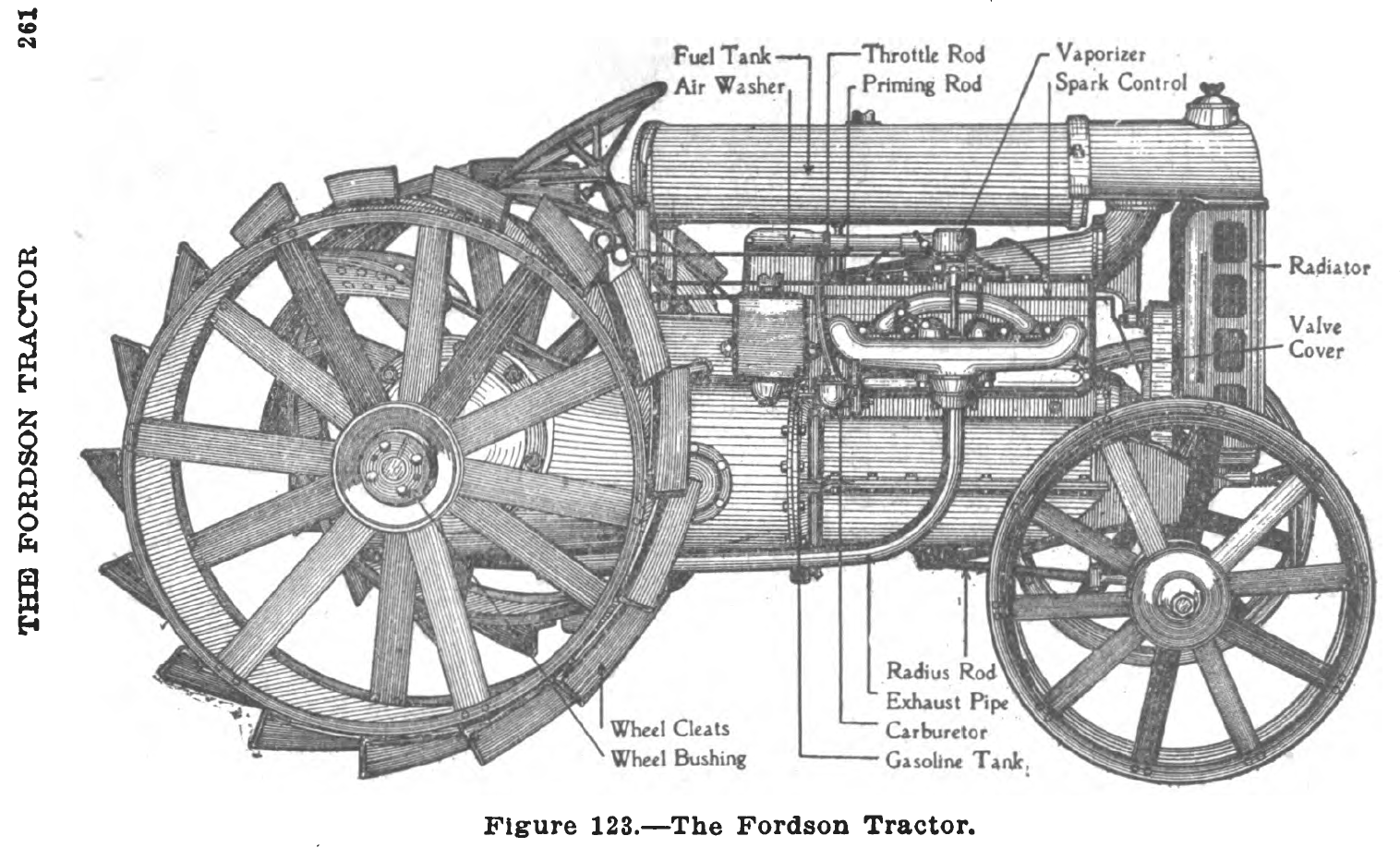
Overview of the original Fordson tractor

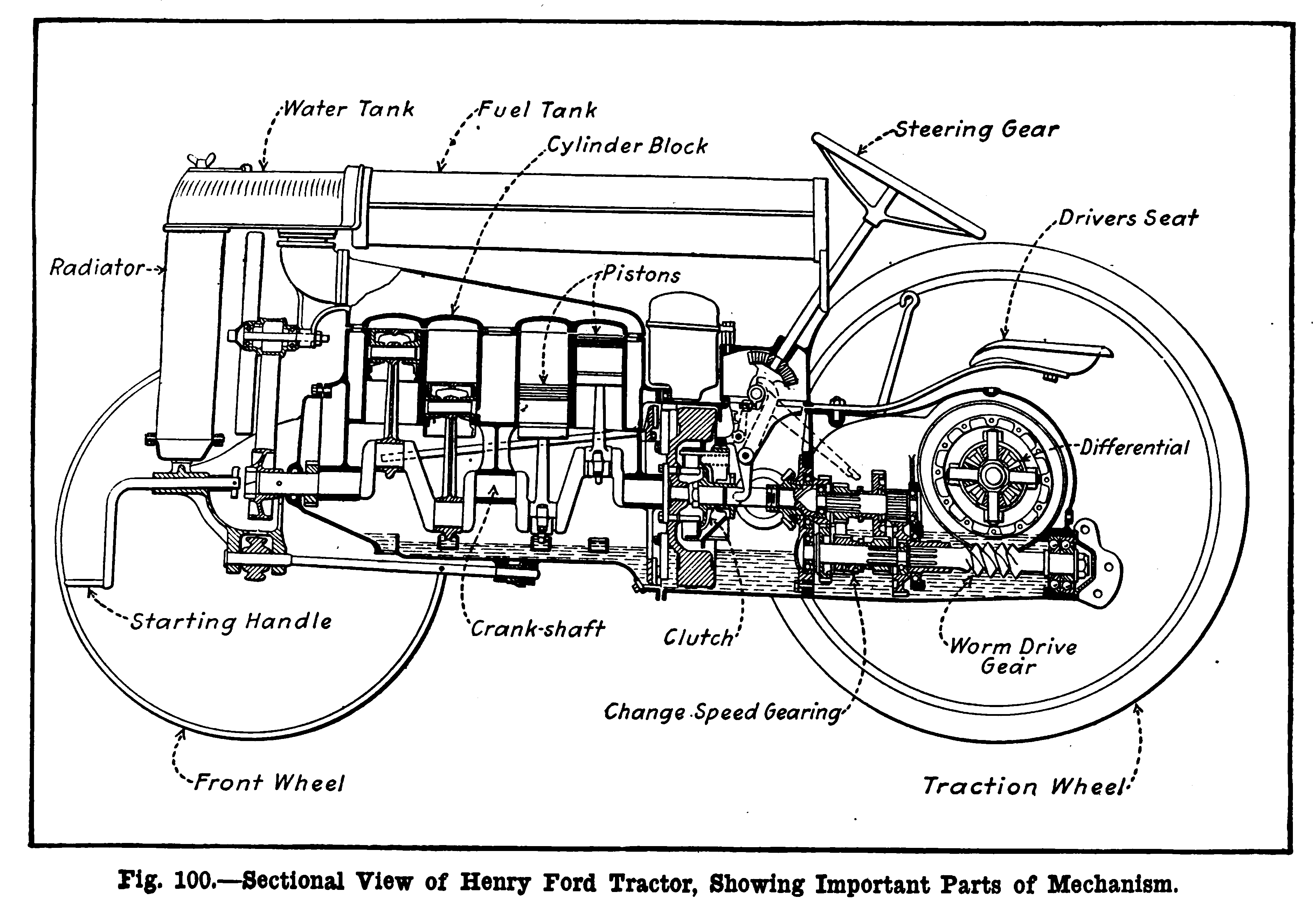
A cutaway view of the original Fordson tractor

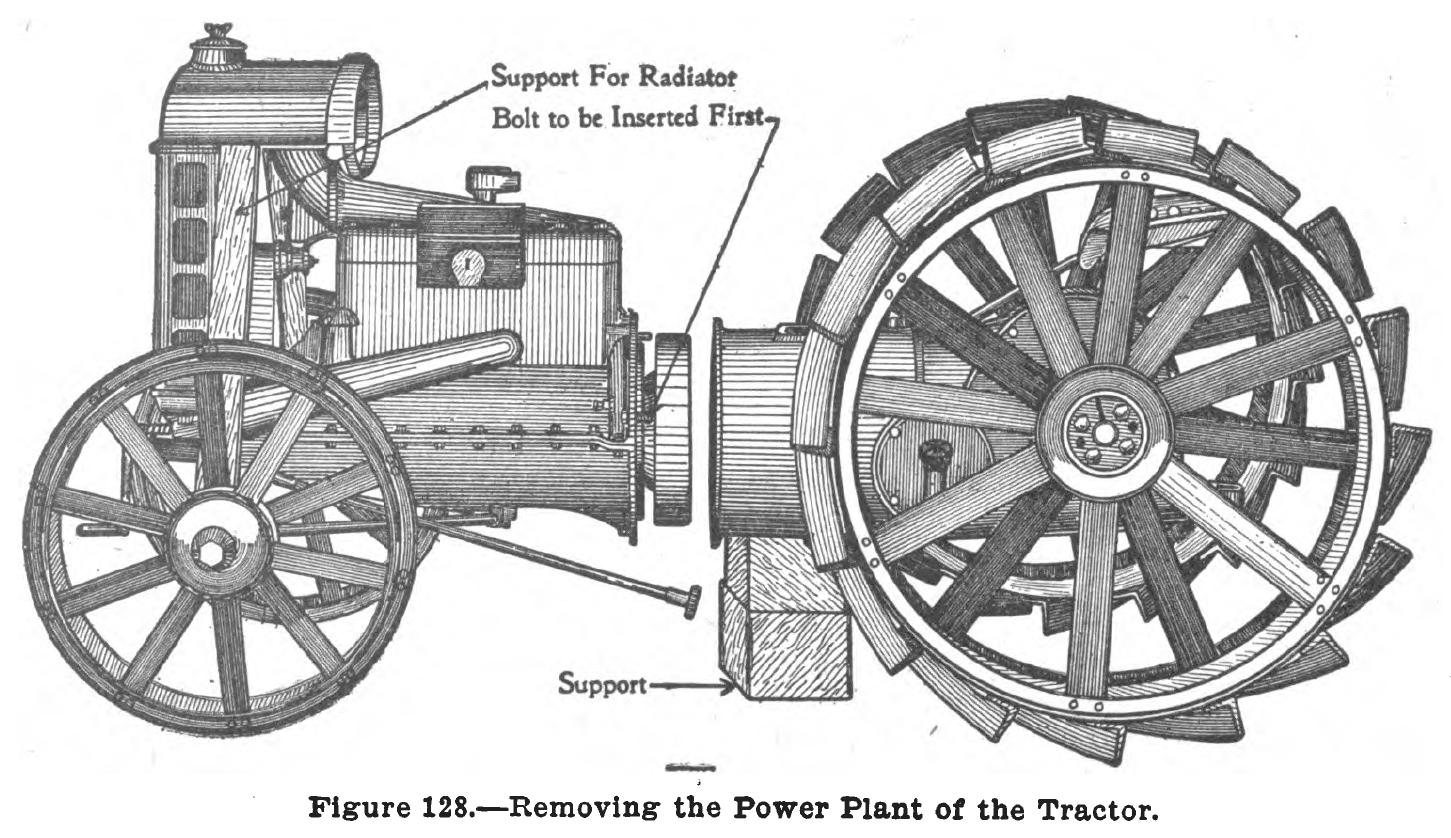
Disassembly of the original Fordson tractor, showing the unit-frame construction and how the tractor can be taken apart for service, with blocks of wood inserted to support the separated parts

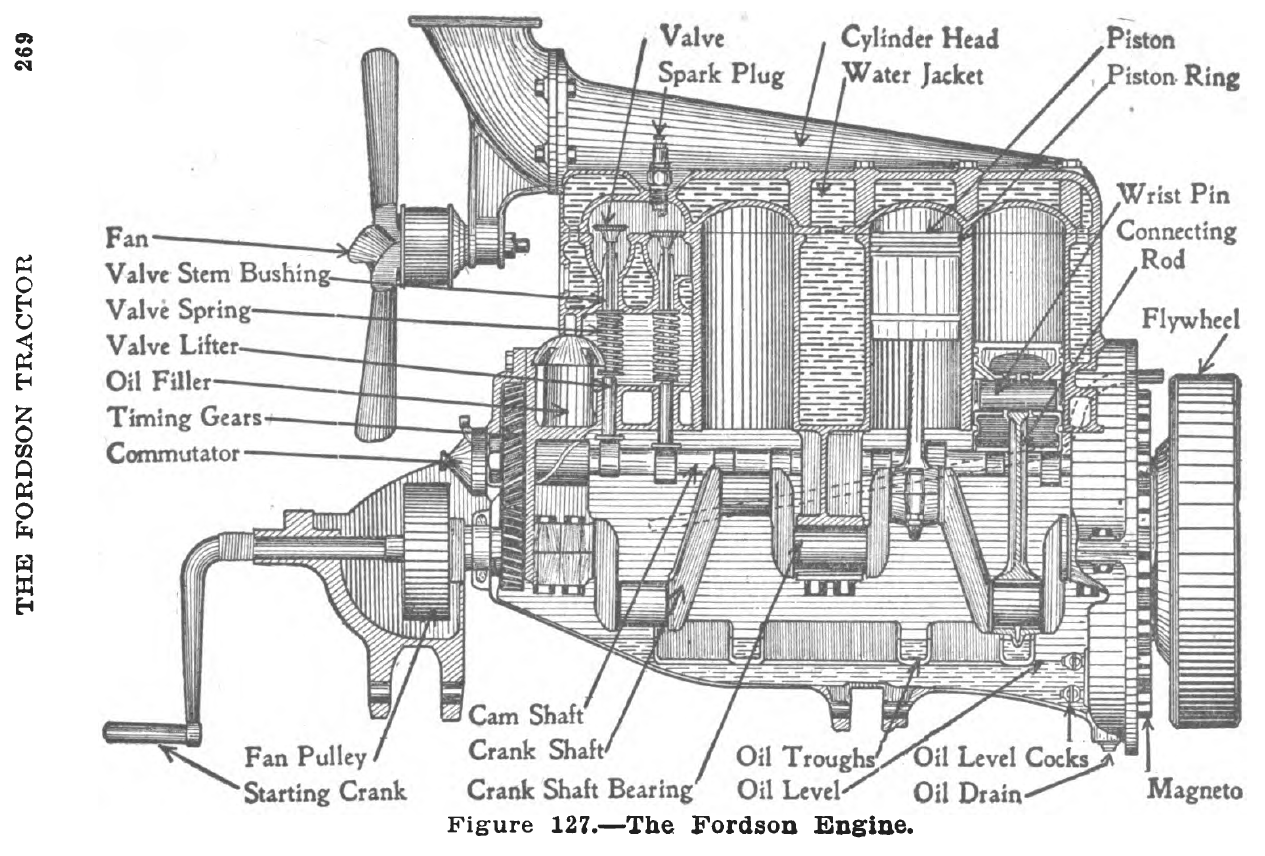
A cutaway view of the engine of the original Fordson tractor

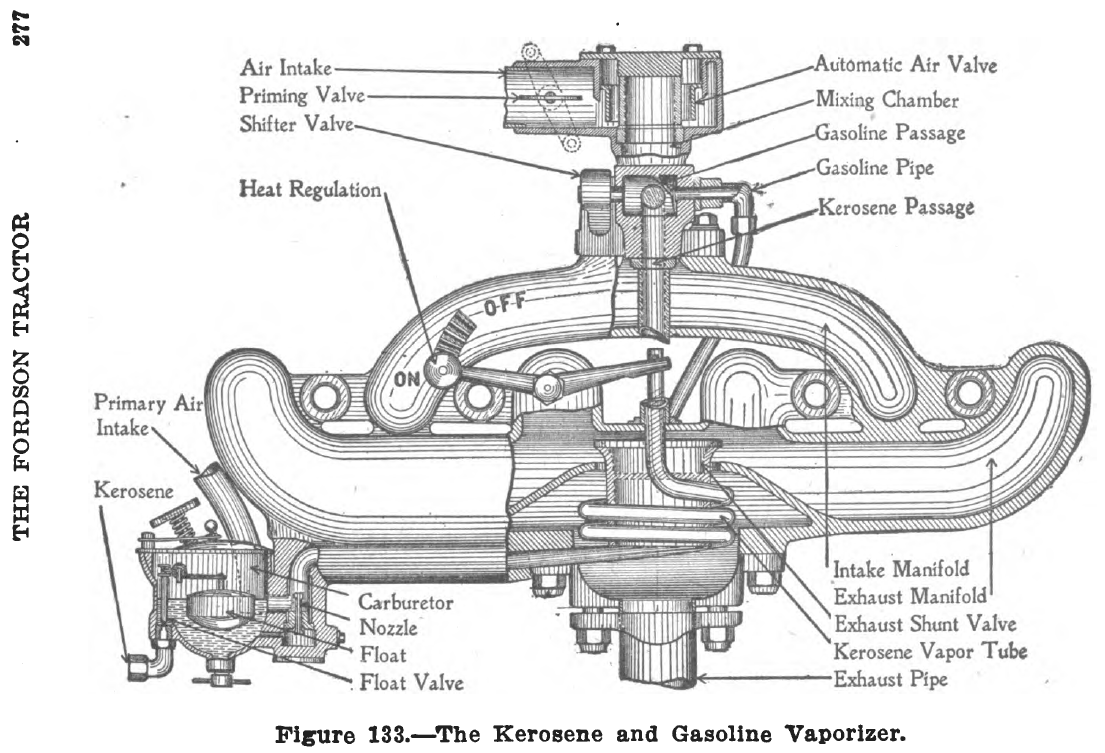
A cutaway view of the intake of the original Fordson tractor (including the intake manifold, vaporizer, carburetor, and fuel lines)

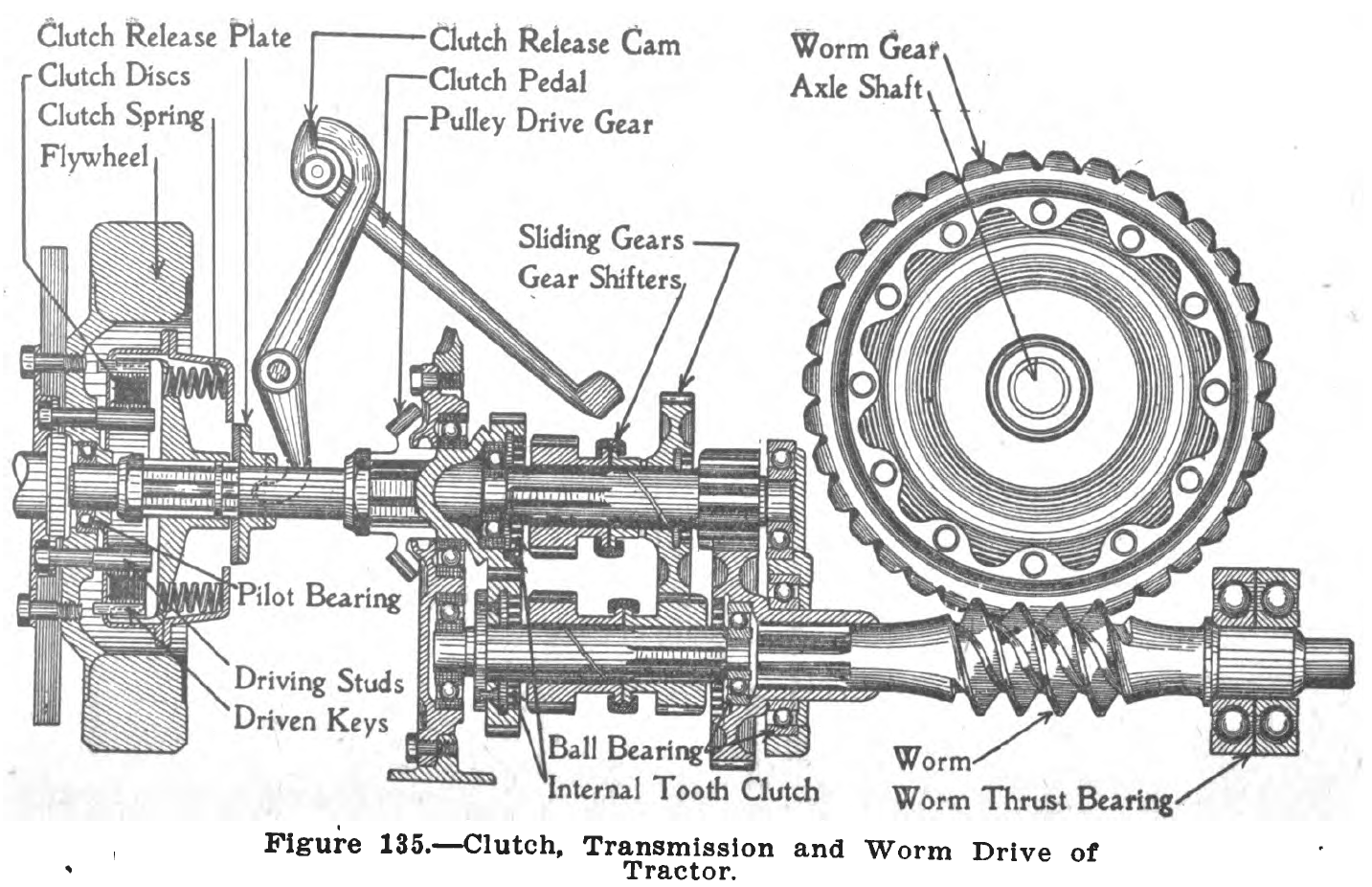
A cutaway view of the clutch, transmission, and rear of the original Fordson tractor, including the worm drive

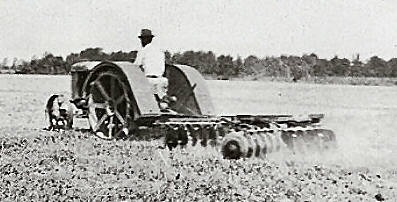
An early Fordson discing a field in Princess Anne County, Virginia, USA, in 1925

The prototypes of the new Henry Ford & Son tractor, which would later be called the Fordson, were completed in 1916. World War I was raging in Europe, and the United Kingdom, a net importer of food, was desperate for tractors in its attempt to expand its agriculture enough to feed Britain despite the great shipping disruption of the war. In 1917, the British Ministry of Munitions selected the Fordson for both importation from the U.S. and domestic U.K. production. It was thought that domestic U.K. production was preferable because so much Atlantic shipping was being sunk that exporting tractors from the U.S. would be counterproductive, as many would be lost at sea. This was soon modified to exclude the London area because of concerns about its vulnerability to German attacks. Henry Ford decided to build the tractor at Cork, Ireland (which at the time was still part of the U.K.), partly because he wanted to bring jobs to, and foster industriousness in, southern Ireland. But the Cork plant did not begin production until 1919 after the war had ended. As events turned out, thousands of tractors were exported from the U.S. in 1917 and 1918.

The tractor used a 20 hp (15 kW), inline four-cylinder engine. The engine was similar to the Ford Model T engine in many respects. Like many engines of its day, it was multifuel-capable; it was usually tuned for gasoline or kerosene, but alcohol could also be burned. (Tractor vaporizing oil [TVO] existed in 1920 but was not yet widely used. It entered broader use in the 1930s and 1940s.) Like many other multifuel machines, the Fordson started on gasoline from a small auxiliary tank (just a few quarts/litres) and then switched over to the main fuel tank once warmed up sufficiently (no more than 5 minutes). To handle the kerosene (or, rarely, TVO), the intake system had a vaporizer downstream of the carburetor. The mixture coming from the carburetor was intentionally rich, and the vaporizer heated it and mixed it with more air to lean it out to the final ratio before entering the inlet manifold. The intake system also had a water bath air cleaner to filter the dust out of the air inhaled by the engine (an invention that did not originate at Ford but that was still rather novel in 1917). Air cleaning is critical to engine lifespan, even for road vehicles and most especially for farming and construction vehicles (which work in environments where dirt is frequently stirred up into the air). The Fordson carburetor and air cleaner were designed by Holley. In later decades, the water bath would be replaced with an oil bath for better filtering performance.

The ignition system was similar to that of the Model T, with a flywheel-mounted low-tension magneto and trembler coils. The ignition timing was manually advanced or retarded with the spark advance lever mounted near the steering column, which rotated the timer. The cooling was by thermosiphon. (In later decades, a high-tension magneto and a water pump would be added.) The transmission was a three-speed spur gear (the three forward speeds ranged from approximately 2 1/4 to 6 1/4 mph). A worm drive reduction set and a differential made up the rear. The design of the rear was patented for its ease of manufacture and service. Brakes were not provided on early Fordsons, as high-ratio worm sets generally transmitted rotation in one direction only, from the worm element to the gear element, because of the high power loss through friction. To stop the tractor, the driver depressed the clutch.

Ford engineer Eugene Farkas successfully made the engine block, oil pan, transmission, and rear axle stressed members constituting the frame. By eliminating the need for a heavy separate frame, costs were reduced and manufacturing was simplified. Ford held a patent on a unit-frame tractor. The rear wheels were fabricated steel, spoked and cleated. The earliest ones were 12-spoke; a 14-spoke version followed. Several models of the front wheel were used, including 10-spoked fabricated steel and 5-spoke cast iron. Industrial models also used other wheels designed for specific tasks, including aftermarket wheels.

In 1916 and 1917, the name "Fordson" was not yet used as the tractor's make or model name, nor was "Model F". During this period, terms such as "the [real/genuine] Ford tractor" or "the Henry Ford tractor", as well as "the MOM tractor" (because almost all output was going to the British Ministry of Munitions), were used. "The Ford Tractor Company" had already been registered on March 15, 1915, by W. Baer Ewing and Paul W. Ford. In early 1918, the name "Fordson" was trademarked, and within a few months, it was being marked on the tractors. Published sources vary somewhat on the origin of the name. All agree that the name reflects the contemporary name of the tractor company, "Henry Ford & Son", and its obvious eponyms: Henry and Edsel. Some claim that the company had been using the cable address "Fordson" for several years, which would mean even before the company was officially incorporated in July 1917. Another implies that February 1918 marked the first use of "Fordson" in a cablegram. Regardless, by April 1918 the name "Fordson" was established as the brand, and its eponyms were obvious. In that month, U.S. sales began under County War Board distribution rules. The Model F designation (for essentially the same model, with improvements) began in 1919. Sales boomed in 1918 and 1919.

There was nothing about the Fordson's design or farming capabilities that was a "first-ever" among tractors (Ford's version of a unit frame was novel for tractors, but that didn't give it special farming advantages). But it was the first tractor that combined all of the following factors: it was small, lightweight, mass-produced, and affordable; it had a large distribution network (dealers nearby in many locales); and it had a widely trusted brand (via Ford). Such factors made it possible for the average farmer to own a tractor for the first time. Thus Henry Ford and colleagues had done again, for the tractor, what they had recently done for the automobile with the Ford Model T. Ford incorporated his private company, Henry Ford and Son Inc, to mass-produce the tractor on July 27, 1917. The Fordson tractor went into mass production in 1917 and debuted for sale on October 8, 1917, for US$750.

At a hurriedly built factory in Dearborn, Michigan, he used the same assembly line techniques he used to mass-produce the Ford Model T. It took thirty hours and forty minutes to convert the raw materials into the 4,000 parts used for the tractor assembly. At this time, the Fordson sold for US$750; each cost $567.14 to manufacture (including labor, materials and overhead), leaving a profit of $182.86. Soon Dearborn was sending knock-down kits to final assembly plants in various U.S. states, including New Jersey, Iowa, and Missouri. The core of Fordson production later moved to the new Ford River Rouge Complex.

The Fordson succeeded in being cheaper to maintain than horses, as the Ford Model T had previously done. A government test concluded that farmers spent $.95 per acre plowing with a Fordson compared to feeding eight horses for a year and paying two drivers, which cost $1.46 per acre.

Despite several early design flaws and reliability issues such as engine failure and unbearable heat, the Fordson established a firm foothold on U.S. farms, with more than 70% market share in earlier years. By mid-1918, more than 6,000 Fordson tractors were in use in Britain, Canada, and the United States.

In the U.S., Ford established a policy in 1919 to loan Fordson tractors to educational institutions with vocational training programs. Agricultural colleges could use a Fordson for six months and then exchange it for a new one. Under this arrangement, forty-two tractors were loaned to such universities as Cornell, Idaho, Michigan, Maryland and Prairie View State Normal in Texas. Others went to the orphanage at Nacoochee Institute in Georgia, the Berry School at Rome, Georgia, and Camp Dix at Hutchinson, Kansas.

Annual production reached 36,781 in 1921 and 99,101 in 1926. By 1925, Ford had built its 500,000th Fordson tractor. Ford was the only automotive firm to sell cars, trucks, and tractors simultaneously from 1917 to 1928, during which time 552,799 Fordson tractors were built.

==== Operation ====
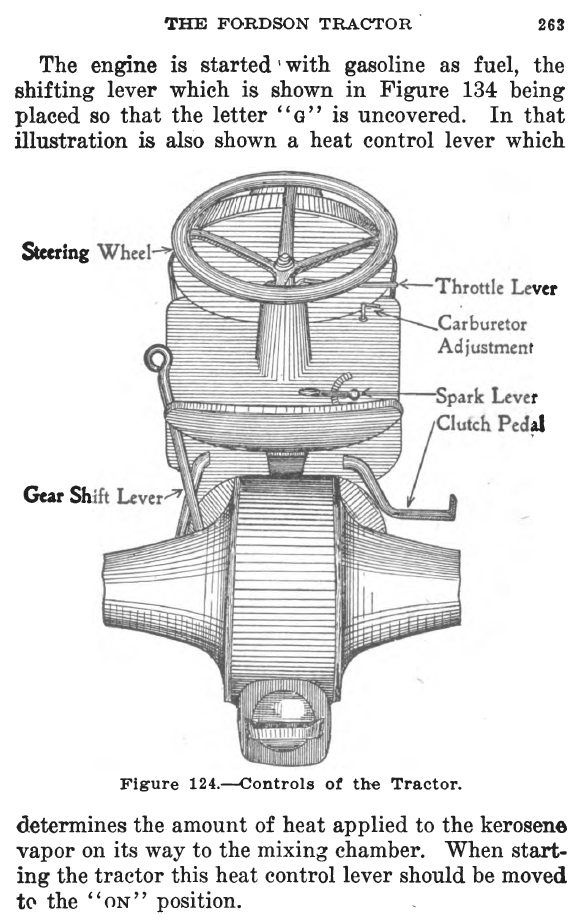
An operator's-eye view of the controls of the original Fordson tractor

Like the Model T car, a Fordson tractor that was relatively new and well maintained would start easily in warm weather. Under such conditions, often a single crank pull would start it. However, in cold weather, starting could be difficult, especially once the machines were 10, 20, or 30 years old and worn out. In cold weather, the oil congealed on the cylinder walls and the clutch plates. The engine had to be hand cranked repeatedly with great effort. Strong men took turns cranking between intervals when individual ignition coils were adjusted. Sometimes farmers would build a fire under the tractor to warm up the crankcase and gearboxes to make it crank easier. The tractor, when in use, was fueled by kerosene, but gasoline was required to start it.

The Fordson could pull discs and plows that would require at least four mules to pull, and it could work all day long, provided the radiator was continually filled, the fuel replenished, and the water in the air filter tank changed. The carburetor air was filtered by bubbling it through a water tank. On dry days, the mud would build up in the water tank after a few of hours of operation. The mud would then have to be flushed out and the tank refilled.

==== Reliability and roll-overs ====
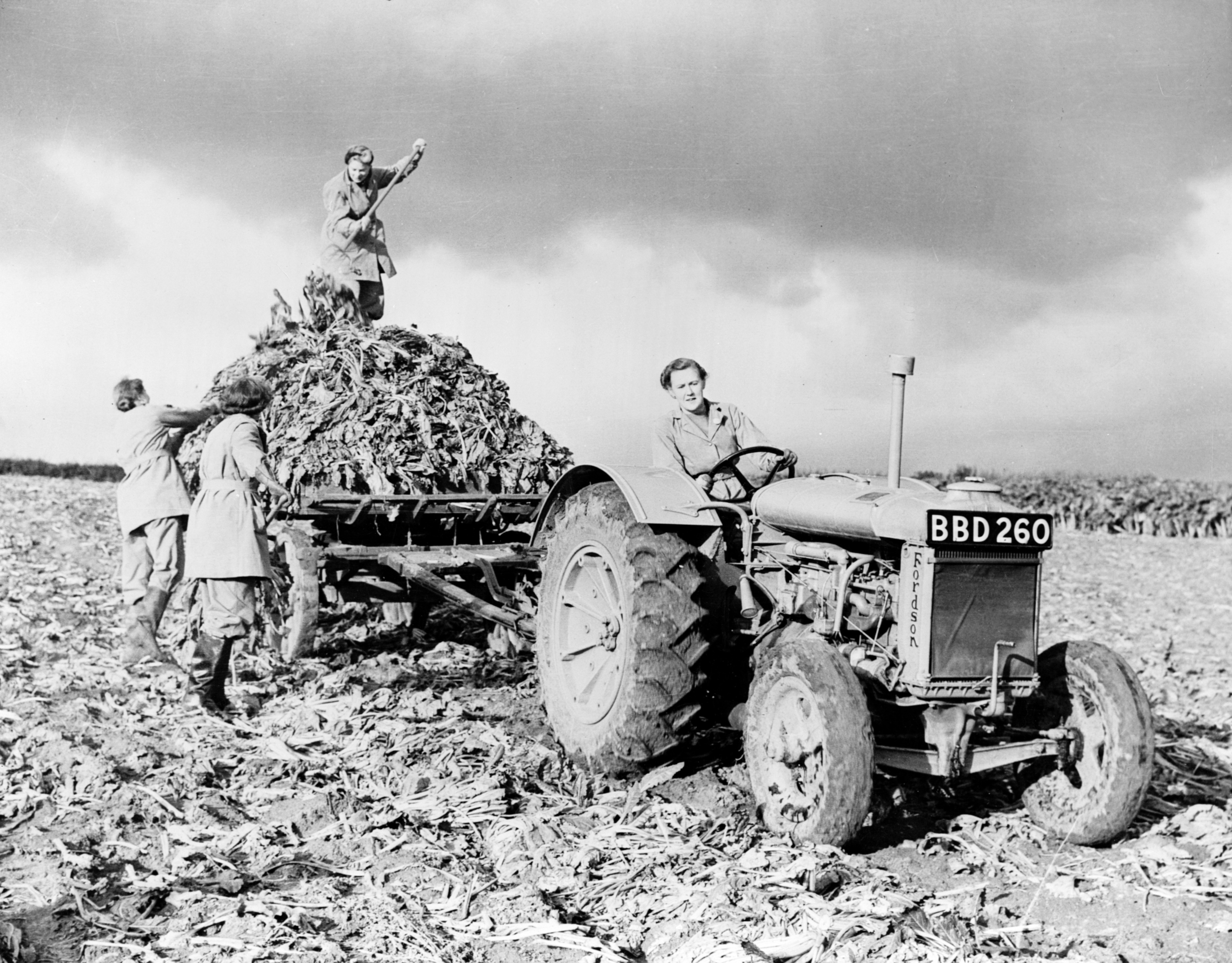
A Fordson harvesting beets during the early 1940s

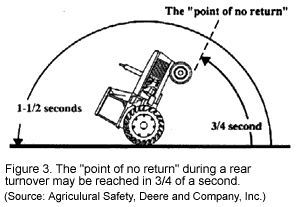
Farm tractor rear turnover

The Fordson Model F was not without flaws it shared with other brands. These problems included practical limits to traction, especially under muddy, snowy, or icy conditions, and the habit of rearing over backward if the plow encountered an obstruction. Many people complained that the traction would be better if the tractor were heavier, although Henry Ford always countered that merely adding weight was not a smart way to maximize traction.

Ford began shipping Fordson tractors to Ford Motor Company Limited in Britain in 1917 to meet an order from the British government for 5,000. Between the time the order was accepted and when production started, Ford overhauled the design to solve several problems. The car-type radiator was enlarged to 11 US gal (9.2 imp gal; 42 L) capacity to cure overheating problems. The additional weight also helped hold the front down. In early Fordsons, the drive worm was located at the top under the driver's seat. During heavy operation, the heat became unbearable to the operator. The drive worm was relocated to solve this problem and also allowed larger rear wheels which improved traction. Several changes were also made to simplify manufacture. The Fordson used the Model T coil magneto system; and water and oil pumps were eliminated in favor of the simpler thermosiphon cooling and splash lubrication.

Despite design and assembly improvements, Ford's still required a high level of maintenance. A farmer near Atlanta in 1921 listed the cost of his Fordson repairs for the year as $1,246. He recorded problems in his diary, noting difficulty starting the engine, a broken wheel, engine failure, and the rear end bursting throughout January, totaling costs of $1,301 for 620 hours of work. A Colorado farmer telephoned his dealer three times a day to complain about his Fordson.

The most dangerous problem occurred when a towed implement became immovable: the stoppage of the implement would cause a reaction through the transmission that would flip the tractor over backward, sometimes killing the driver. This condition was caused by the low-geared worm drive, lightweight, and short length so there was an insufficient downward load to counter the reaction torque. The cause is sometimes said to have been introduced when the drive worm was relocated below the main drive pinion on the differential. However, the problem already existed, but was made worse by the higher differential position, which was accompanied by larger rear wheels, which required more torque to give the same drawbar force. One Indiana farmer believed the Fordson to be so dangerous that it should have been banned by law.

The Eastern Implement Dealer claimed that Fordsons killed 36 drivers in 1918. Pipp's Weekly further claimed that Fordsons had killed 136 men up to August 1922. Ford spokesmen maintained the accidents resulted from inexperienced drivers, saying any tractor could be dangerous if improperly handled. Satisfied customers praised the Fordson, saying it made farm work easier and performed ideally in orchards and truck farms.

==== Importation and production in Ireland, England, and the Soviet Union ====
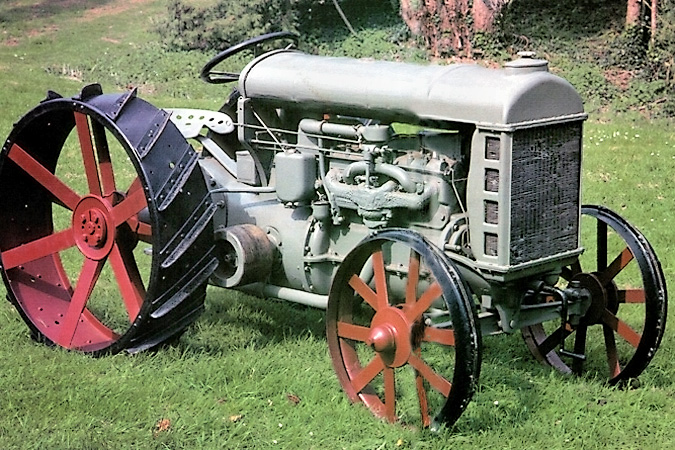
A 1917 Fordson Model F tractor

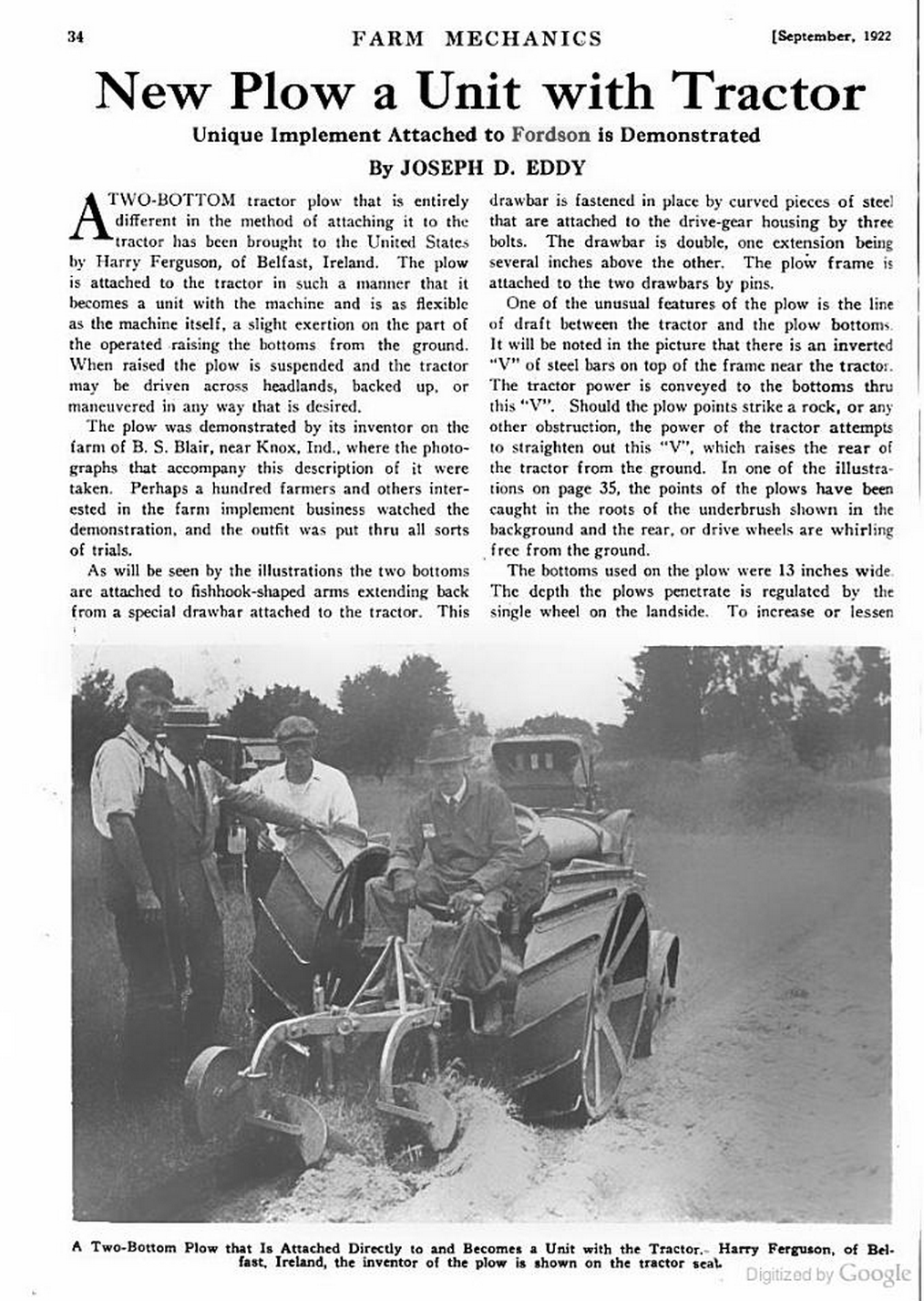
Harry Ferguson's tractor hitch is shown in 1922 as an aftermarket attachment mounted on a Fordson tractor. It is a fully mechanical version with a depth wheel (a small wheel that sets the plow depth). By 1926, Ferguson and colleagues had developed and patented the modern hydraulic three-point hitch. Ferguson sold his hitches and implements during the 1920s and 1930s and worked with David Brown to produce Ferguson-brand tractors. In 1938 Ferguson finally struck an agreement with Henry Ford to put Ferguson hitches on Ford tractors at the factory—something he had first attempted in 1920 and 1921 at Cork and Dearborn. Their 1938 agreement led to the Ford 9N.

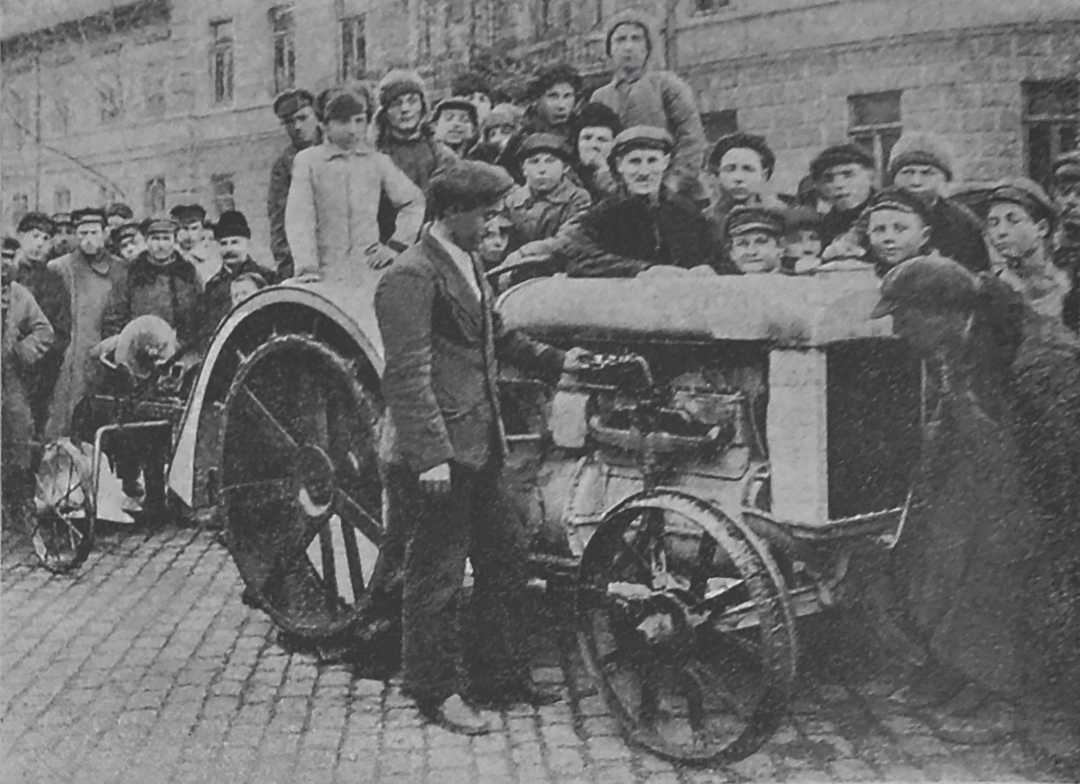
Imported Fordson Model F tractor in seaport Odessa, Ukrainian SSR 1925.

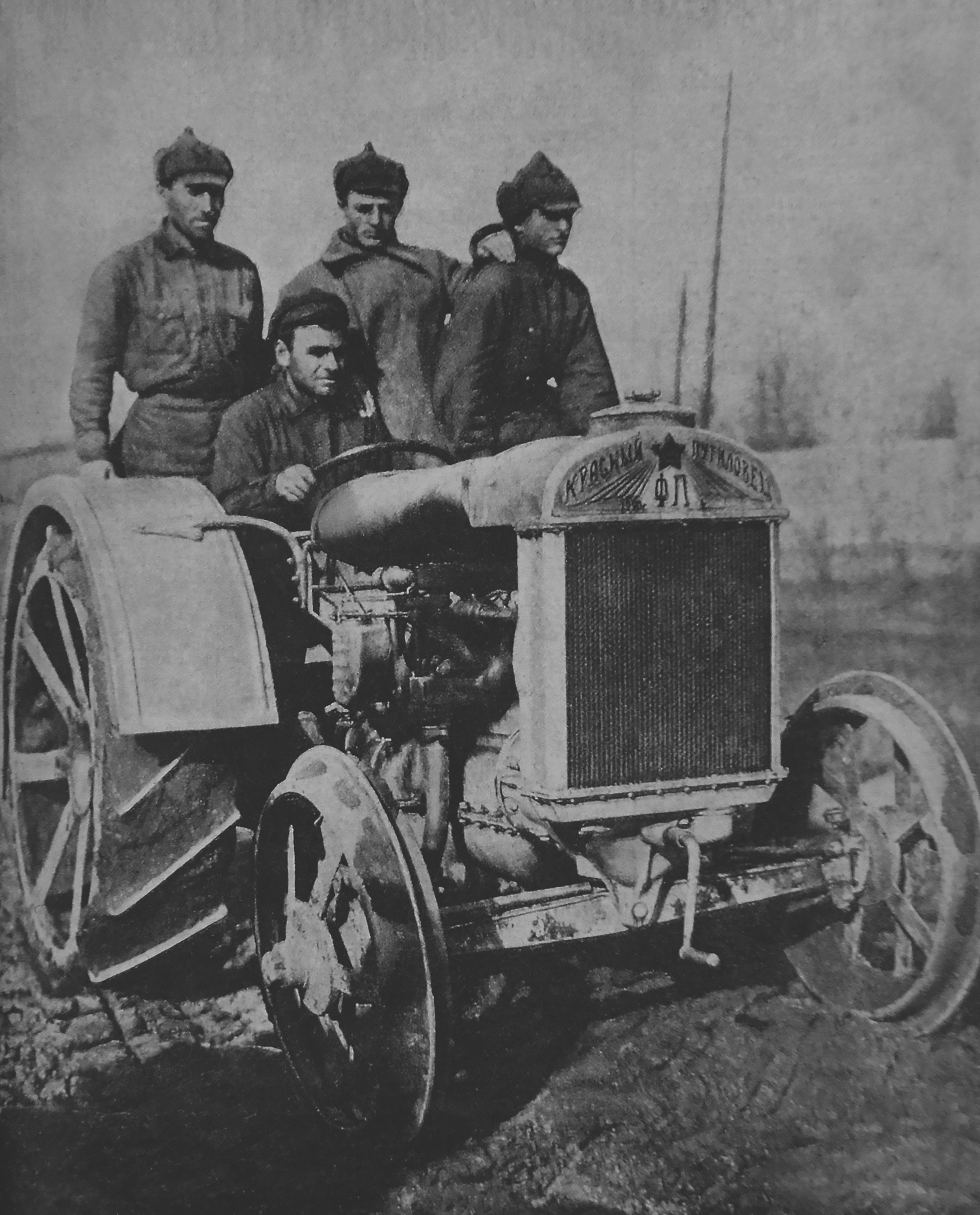
The copy of Fordson F under the brand Fordson-Putilovets. Ukrainian SSR 1930

As described earlier, because the Fordson was born in 1916, its production site choices and export/import were shaped by the Allied war effort for World War I. Almost all of the first tractors went to the U.K. in 1917. In 1918 and 1919, sales spread to Canada and the U.S., and U.K. production began in pre-independence Ireland.

Ford signed a contract for a large consignment of Fordson tractors to the Soviet Union in 1919, which soon became the largest customer of the company. From 1921 until 1927, the Soviet Union imported over 25,000 Fordsons. These inexpensive and robust tractors became the major enticement for Soviet peasants towards collectivization and were often seen on Soviet posters and paintings during the era, such as in The First Tractor. As also happened with Ford cars and trucks imported in the early 1920s, the Soviets immediately began their domestic production of replacement parts and clones. In 1924, the Leningrad plant "Red Putilovite" (Красный Путиловец) started the production of Fordson-Putilovets tractors (Фордзон-путиловец). During the 1920s, the Soviet versions had a reputation for insufficient quality. Much of this was because the metallurgy and heat treatment were wrong. For example, no matter how perfectly one machines a shaft or gear, it will fail early if the hardness is wrong. As Soviet industrialization progressed in the 1930s, the worst of the quality problems were solved.

By mid-1918, more than 6,000 Fordson tractors, all U.S.-built, were in use in Britain, Canada, and the United States. After World War I ended, production began in Cork, Ireland, in parallel with U.S. production. Fordson tractors quickly shaped the U.S. tractor market and held over 70% of the market in earlier years.

Henry Ford had a power struggle with Ford Motor Company's shareholders (including the Dodge Brothers, Horace and John Dodge) that culminated in 1919. He resigned from Ford Motor Company with the threat (fully realizable) to treat Henry Ford & Son Inc as his new enterprise for all of his future cars, trucks, and tractors (he would begin with all-new designs), which would turn Ford Motor Company into a mere badly led competitor, destroying its stock's value. This maneuver worked; Henry Ford bought out all the minority shareholders of Ford Motor Company in 1919, and then consolidated ownership in the Ford family: fifty-five percent in his name, forty-two percent in son Edsel's name and the remaining three percent in wife Clara's name. He merged Henry Ford & Son into the Ford Motor Company in 1920.

From July 1919 to July 1920, Fordson produced 78,006 tractors. Annual production reached 36,781 in 1921. The Fordson had established a firm foothold on U.S. farms.

In February 1922, after-sales had suffered from the depression of 1920–1921 and with stiffer competition from International Harvester, John Deere, J.I. Case, Allis-Chalmers, and others, Ford decided to reduce the price of the Model F from $625 to $395. This sparked a price war in the tractor industry known as the "tractor wars". To compensate for the lower price, Ford had to cut costs and strive for larger-volume production.

Meanwhile, in Ireland, the Irish War of Independence occurred. Production at Cork never flourished during this first period, although a few thousand tractors a year were built. Ford ended production at Cork in 1922 and shipped the factory's equipment back to the U.S. in 1923. (It would return some years later, as described below.)

By 1925, Ford had built its 500,000th Fordson tractor. Annual production reached 99,101 in 1926. By May 1927, total production figures had reached 650,000. By 1928, total production figures had reached 700,000.

In February 1928, Ford surprised his U.S. market by ending U.S. Fordson production. Various reasons have been suggested. One was that IHC's Farmall and other competitors had taken away the mystique of the Fordson in the U.S., and Henry Ford was not content to compete in the U.S. tractor market on a mere commodity basis; he wanted decisive competitive edges. Another is that he envisioned moving all production to Ireland and England because Europe, including Russia, was set to become the most important Fordson market. Henry Ford did not elaborate on his reasons.

Ford of England restarted Fordson manufacture at Cork, which involved a lot of work given that the factory had been disassembled in 1923. Ford Ltd bought much of the tooling from Ford of the U.S. From 1930, Fordson tractors were again sold in the United States, via imports from Cork; the Dagenham plant opened in 1933 and took over production from the Cork plant, which was again closed. George and Eber Sherman became the leading importers of English-built Fordsons.

After Cork became the sole production site in 1928, exports to the US were limited to 1,500 a month. This disrupted the business of countless firms, including Ford dealerships and aftermarket equipment makers (which was a large industry both for the Model T and the Fordson). Many of these firms formed a conglomerate called the United Tractor & Equipment Corporation, which arranged a deal with Allis-Chalmers to build a substitute tractor. By 1933, the deal fell apart, as the Great Depression damaged the economy, and dealers and aftermarket builders could also import Cork-built Fordsons and, starting in 1933, Dagenham-built Fordsons. The United tractor became the Allis-Chalmers Model U.

Given Ford's shutdown of U.S. Fordson production, the next big Soviet orders of American tractors via the Amtorg Trading Corporation went to IHC and others.

The Roaring Twenties had certainly been good for the Ford Motor Company. Even though Henry Ford had to deal with the disappointment of learning that the public would not forever adore and demand his original models of car, truck, and tractor (the Model T, Model TT, and Fordson), his new model of car and truck (Model A) was also very successful. Fordson's success continued at Ford Ltd even though it came to an end in the U.S.

==== Fordson Model N Standard ====
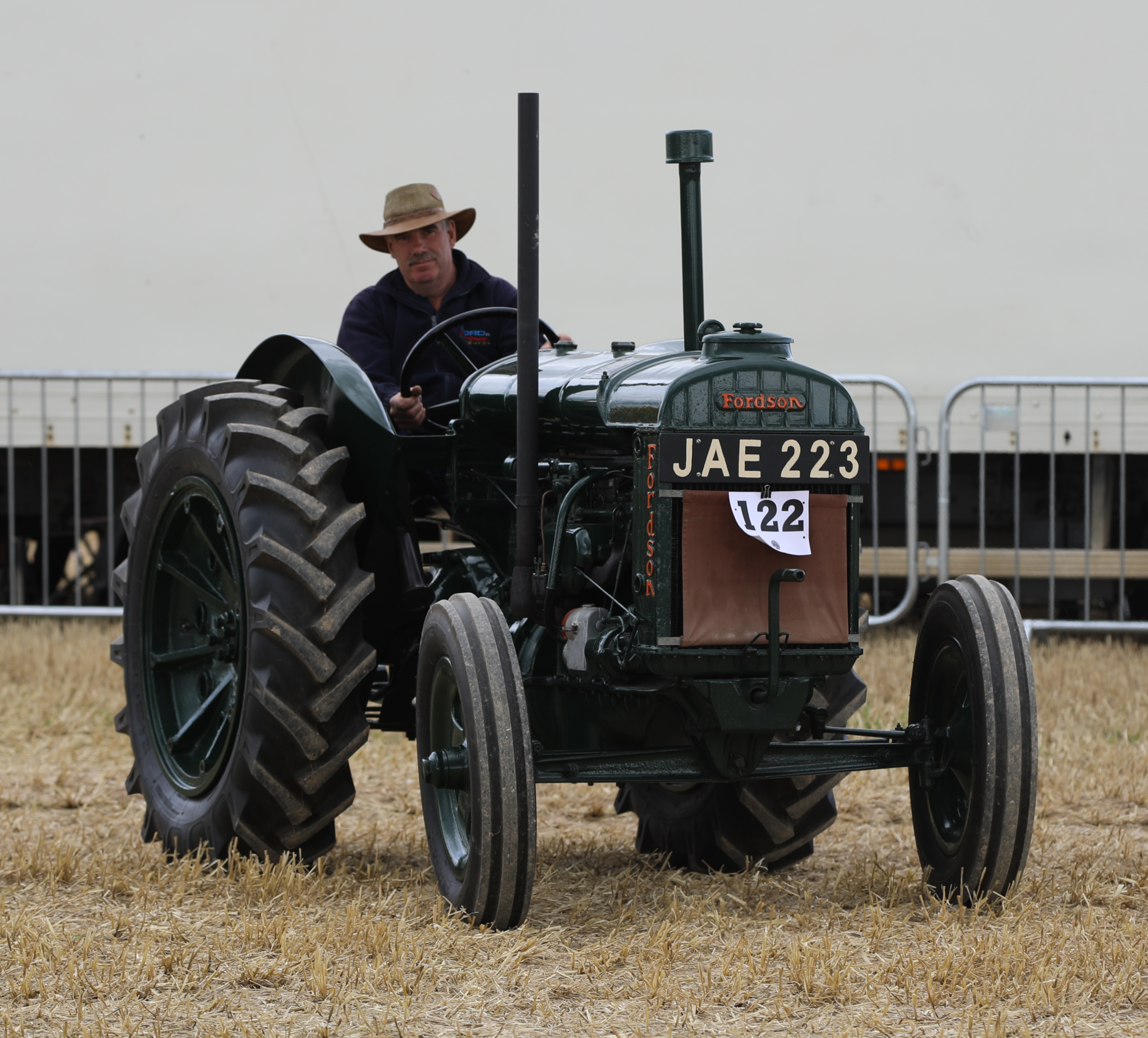
A wartime Fordson Model N tractor

The Fordson Model N replaced the Fordson Model F. It was an improved variant of the F. Production of the Model N started in Cork in 1927. Production of the Fordson Model N was transferred from Cork to Dagenham in 1933. The Model N featured a 27 HP engine, standard rear fenders (mudguards), a higher voltage ignition system, and optional pneumatic tires. In 1935 power take-off (PTO) was available as an option on the Model N.

The Fordson Model N was probably the most important tractor in the United Kingdom during World War II. The Dagenham plant produced over 136,000 Model N tractors during the war. Ford of the U.S. also exported Model 9N tractors to the U.K. during the war.

=== Later Fordson tractors (made in England) ===
==== 1930s experimentation at Dearborn ====
After U.S. Fordson production ceased in 1928, Irish-built and later English-built Fordsons were imported to the U.S.; Eber Sherman was a principal importer.

The development of new Fordson/Ford tractors in the U.S. remained mostly inactive for about 10 years after the end of U.S. production, although Ford did experiment with several designs during the 1930s. Most of them never left the drawing board, which was intentional; Henry Ford was interested in continuing R&D (and continued paying Ford engineers to work on it), although he wasn't going to put any models into production until all conditions (design, market) were right for commercial success. A Fordson row-crop model, essentially a "Fordson version of the Farmall" with tricycle design and high clearance, was prototyped at Dearborn in 1930-1931 but waited until 1936 to be produced, when Ford Ltd of Britain produced it as the Fordson All-Around. (It was not without precedent, for the aftermarket had presaged it, although not with the high clearance; in 1939, Ford filed a patent for raising and lowering the clearance on the fly.) The idea of variable front track for row-crop tractors was also considered at Ford during this era. Achieving it via pivoting cantilevered wheel mounts was one of the options, although Ford never put that method into production (it later reached production in the form of the Avery Ro-Trak in 1938). The thought devoted to the topic paid off later, when the Ford 9N achieved it with another, simpler method. Between 1928 and 1932, Henry Ford's attention became consumed mostly by the development and introduction of his company's first V8 engine, which was introduced by Ford on March 31, 1932, and was an immediate success in Ford cars and trucks. Experimental V8-powered tractor prototypes were built, but no production occurred.

By the late 1930s, Henry Ford's enthusiasm for reentering the tractor market was growing, but he still did not have a design or features that could ensure a runaway, market-changing success. His idea for a tractor with one large drive wheel was extensively developed, but the prototypes did not perform well. Various people who worked on it have wondered whether it was just a ruse to mislead Ford's competitors about his real intentions for a coming model, but it seems that he was quite serious about it and was probably disappointed that it did not work out; if it had worked, it would have been a powerful fulfillment of his penchant for simplicity and very low cost.

His 1938 meeting with Harry Ferguson was the turning point that led to the next Ford tractor, the 9N. The Ferguson system—whose hitch we now call the three-point hitch, or three-point linkage (3PL)—gave Ford the kind of new and special feature that he was wishing to find—something to give a groundbreaking competitive advantage to any new Ford tractor entering the market. After the 1939 introduction of this new line of "Ford" tractors made in the U.S. (the Ford N-series tractors), there was very little importation of English Fordson models to the U.S.

==== E27N ====
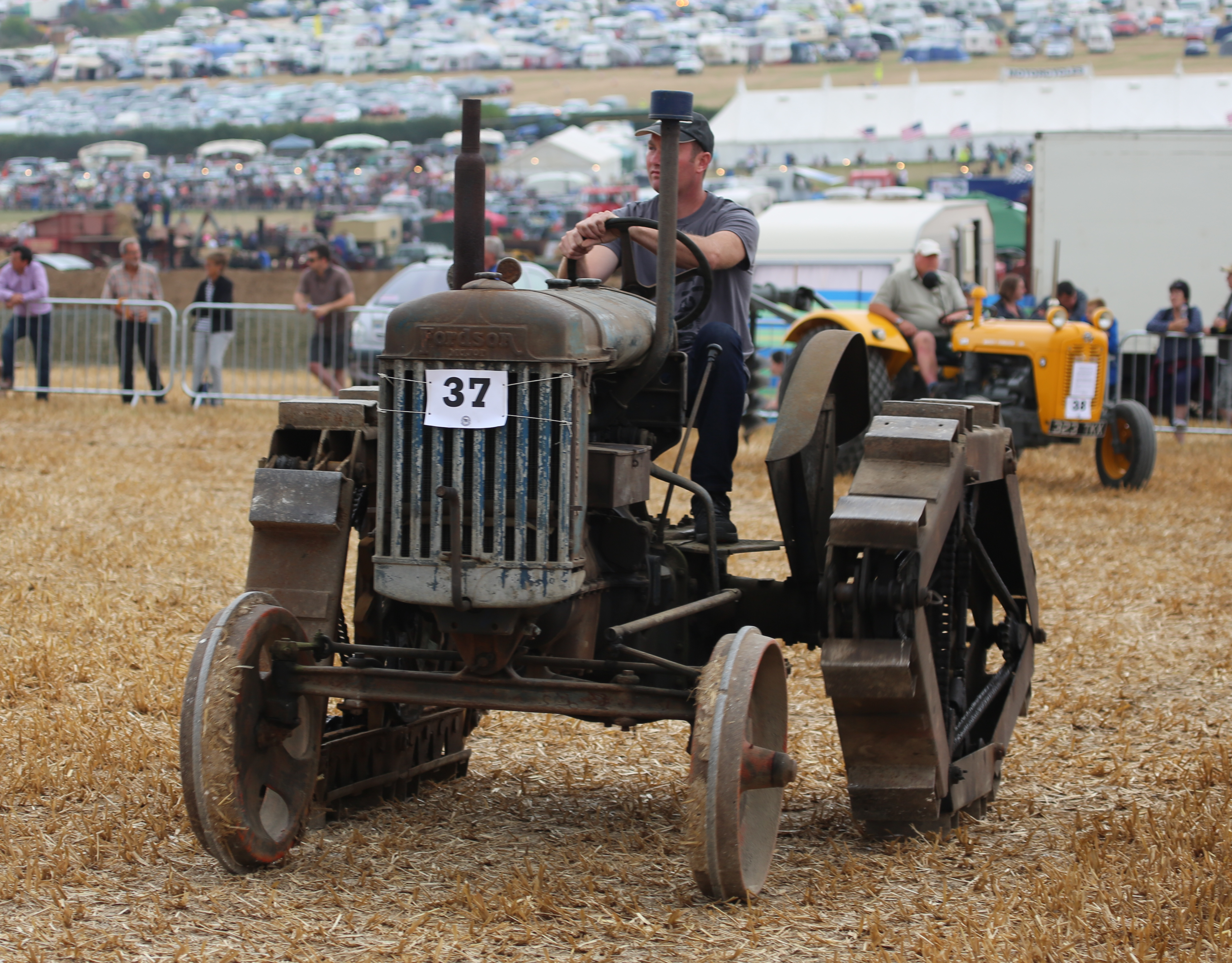
A Fordson E27N fitted with rotopad tracks

The Fordson E27N Major was an upgrade to the Fordson N and was made in England from March 1945, having the same engine and transmission as the Model N, but in a new casting which allowed for a PTO and a hydraulic lift unit manufactured by either Smiths or Varley. The differential however was of a completely new design. For the first time, Fordson owners could purchase a tractor from the dealer fully equipped with 3PL, PTO, full electrics, and an adjustable-width front axle, allowing the tractor to work row crops. Available in many different versions, such as the crawler conversion made by County, and the half-tracked version by Roadless. From 1948 onwards the Perkins P6(TA) could be ordered fitted from the factory, giving the tractor a 45 hp (34 kW) power unit, and improving on the design that was let down by the under-powered petrol/TVO engine. The E27N was a popular Machine with Australian farmers, setting the way for large sales of the New Major (E1A).

==== E1A ====
Post-war shortages delayed the development of an entirely new tractor. In 1952, the "New Major" entered production with a new Ford engine range. The 4D engine was designed and manufactured in the UK at Dagenham and was available as Diesel, Petrol, or Petrol/Kerosene. The tractor had a 6-speed modified version of the E27N transmission. The driver sat significantly lower, which led to the E27N being nicknamed the 'High Major'. In 1958, the Power Major was introduced with 51.8 hp (38.6 kW) and improved transmission and 'live-drive' hydraulics, Then in 1960 the final version, the Super Major came out with a weight transfer system and differential lock. The Super Major was produced until 1964. These tractors were exported to the US—the first since 1939—badged as Fords.

==== Dexta ====
Meanwhile, a smaller new three-cylinder version which was named the Dexta had been launched to compete with the success of the Massey Ferguson 35, of which it shared the basic gearbox and differential casings as well as many other parts. The Dexta and later models MF35 (early models had a Standard 3-cylinder diesel engine) featured the Perkins A3 engine, with a few differences. The engine was at 144 cubic inches (2.4 L) in early Dextas, whereas later machines and Perkins engined MF 35s had the 152 cubic inches (2.5 L) version. The two tractors also had different injector systems and many further differences despite their common platform. The gasoline version of the Dexta had the same Standard engine as the Ferguson TEA and FE 35, one difference being that the starter was relocated to the right side of the Dexta. Unlike the Ferguson, the gasoline Dexta had the same gearbox castings as the diesel version.

=== Aftermarket accessories and conversions ===
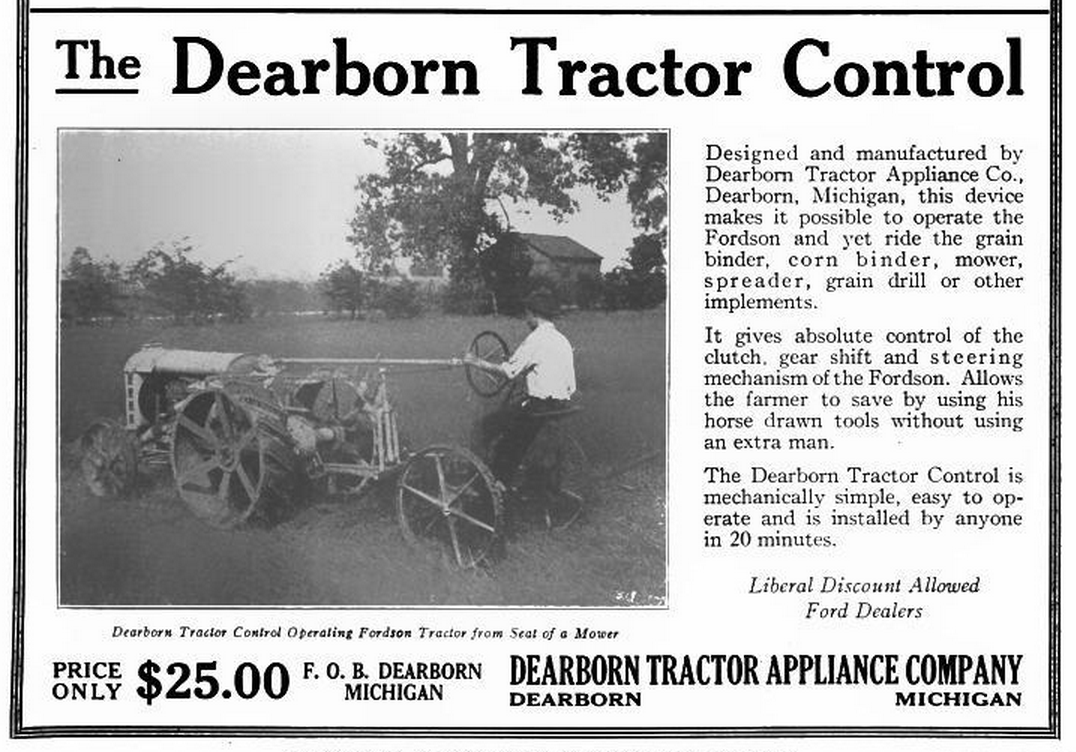
Dearborn Tractor Control, Farm Mechanics magazine, 1922

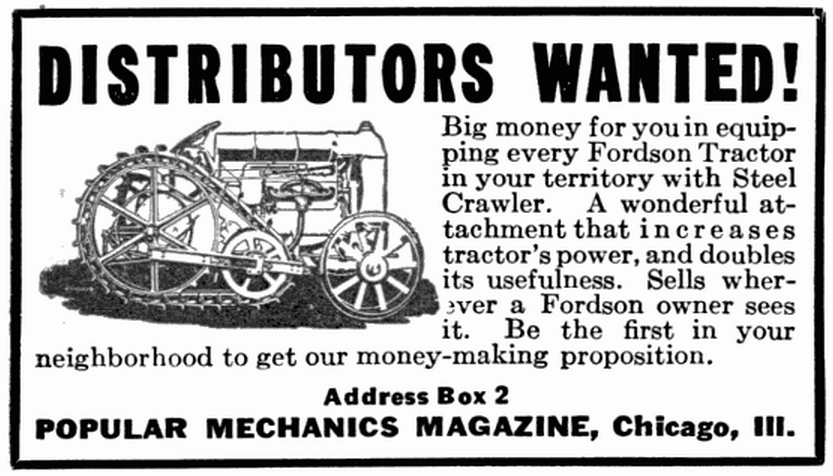
Bates Machine & Tractor Steel Crawler conversion kits, Popular Mechanics, 1922

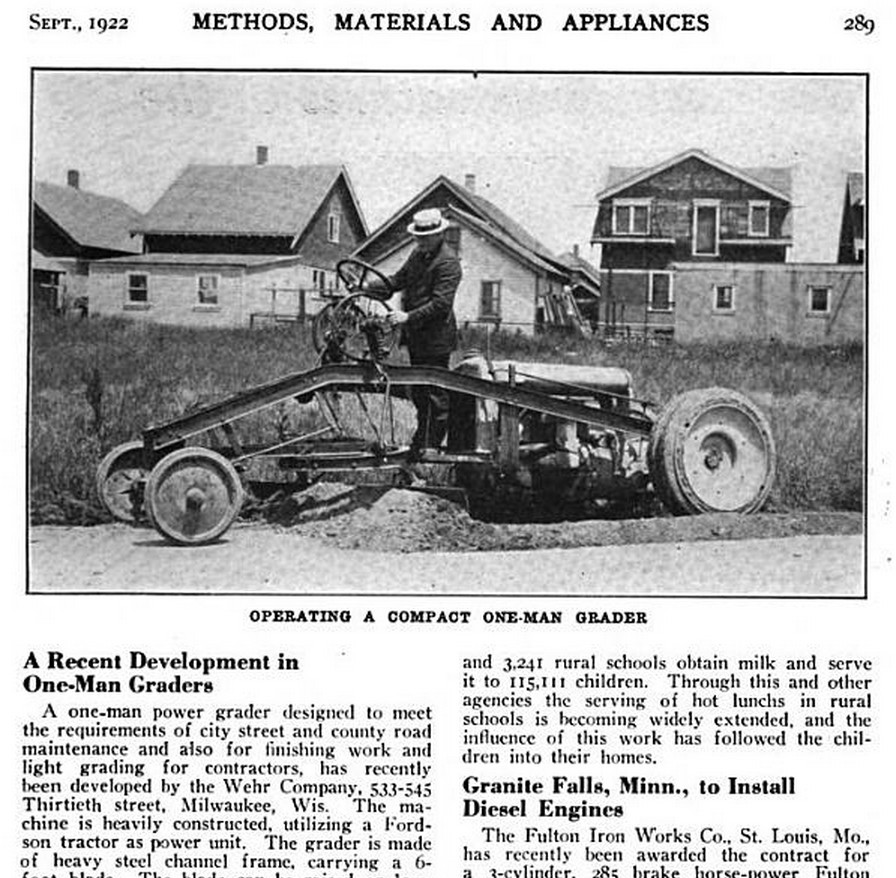
Wehr grader, The American City, 1922

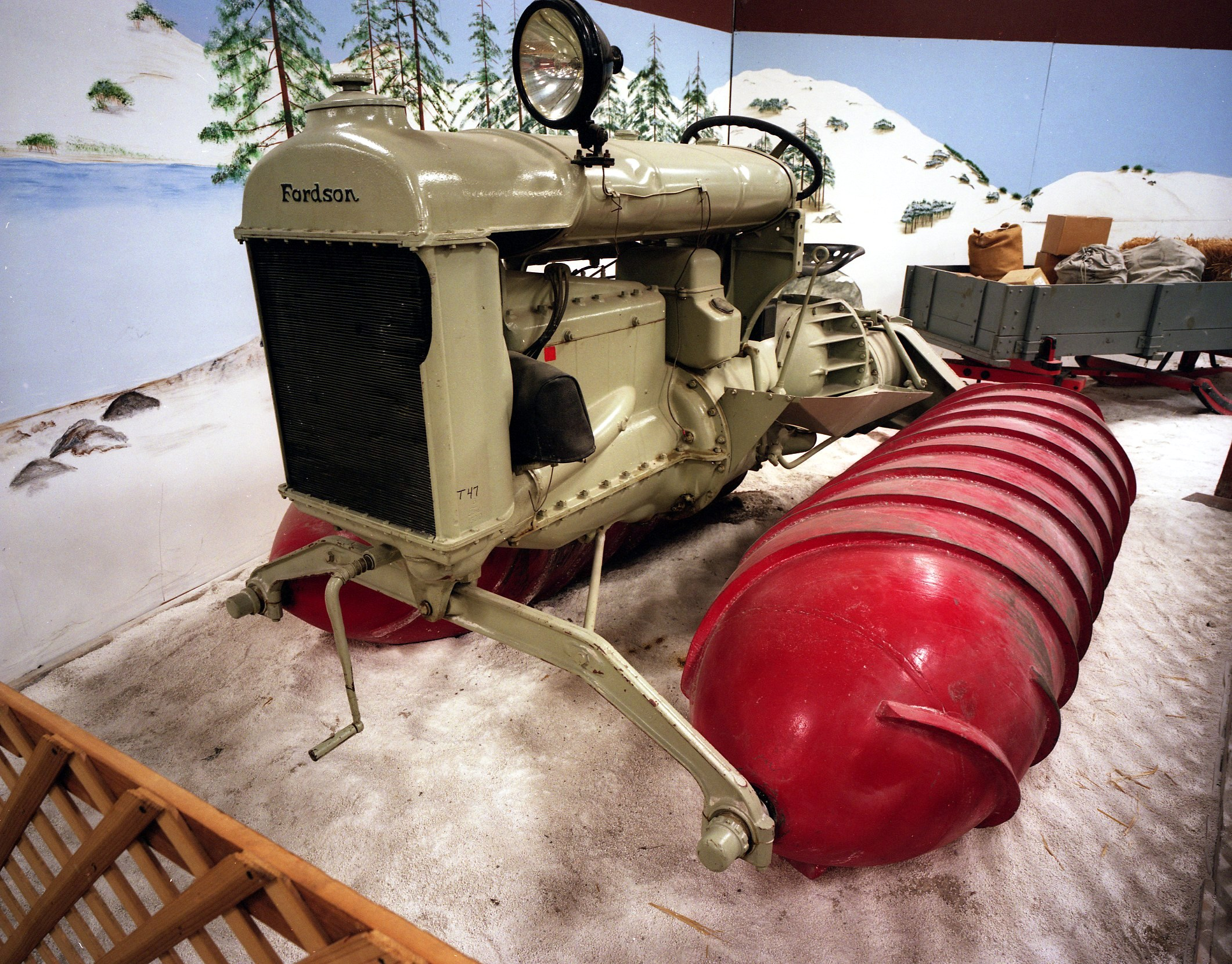
Snow-Motor

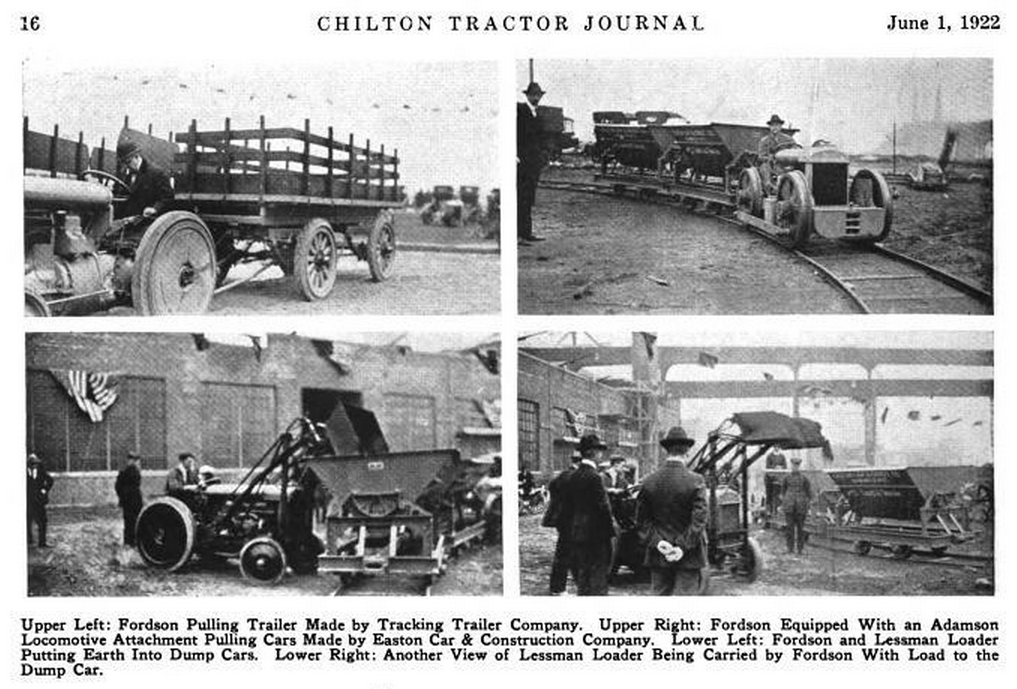
Fordson industrial models with aftermarket accessories, including rail conversion and front end loader

Like Model T cars and trucks, the Fordson tractor provided the basis for a large and varied aftermarket in accessories and conversions. A pair of articles in a 1922 issue of the Chilton Tractor Journal describes the business environment and gives photographs of many of the attachments and conversions available. As with most other tractors, farmers and construction contractors could buy aftermarket governors, ignition parts, hitches, and drawbars; but with the Fordson especially, one could buy a crawler tractor, road grader, or self-propelled combine built by an aftermarket firm that used the Fordson essentially as a platform. For example, the original Gleaner self-propelled combines were built by attaching the combine to a Fordson. At least 3 companies offered crawler conversions, and others offered enlarged cleats, including the "overgrown tire chain" type that had led to crawler development not long before. Several companies converted Fordsons to road graders; the Wehr (video) is well remembered. The first tricycle cultivator version of the Fordson was available as an aftermarket conversion by the Moline Implement Company as early as 1920 or 1921, which was 3 to 4 years before the Farmall was introduced, a full decade before Dearborn prototyped the Fordson All-Around, and a full decade and a half before Ford Ltd produced that model. It lacked those tractors' high clearance but was otherwise prescient.

An economically significant concept is illustrated by kits such as the Dearborn Tractor Control. Its attachments let the person riding the towed implement control the tractor from the implement seat. Such a setup was offered for Fordson by at least three aftermarket suppliers. It was reminiscent of earlier mechanized efforts such as the Detroit Tractor, Moline Universal, and Allis-Chalmers Model 6-12 in that it represented the most literal kind of horse replacement (in some suppliers' cases, even retaining the reins as the control method). But besides providing mere comfort and familiarity for farmers accustomed to working with horses, it also neutralized an economic disadvantage of the tractors of the era. With horses, one person could control both the motive power and the implement, but with a tractor, two were required, because the tractor required a driver and the implement, in many cases, required an operator. Most implements of the era were legacy horse-drawn equipment (a fact that Harry Ferguson had to battle in trying to sell his system of tractor-specific implements during the 1920s and 1930s). Setups such as these cut back the man-hour requirement to match that of the horse—while the tractor's high power and lack of daily, year-round feeding ("eats only when it works") continued to beat the horse economically otherwise. The two-person requirement was often not a problem on farms that had large families; a son or daughter was usually available for duty. But the farm help problem was felt keenly on many other farms, especially during the world wars. Technological advancement eventually made it standard for one person to control both the tractor and implement, via the growing suite of hydraulic and electrical controls, especially after World War II.

In 1926 a corporation called Snow-Motors Inc demonstrated a Fordson Model F converted into a snowmobile, which they dubbed the Snow-Motor. The tractor used bullet-shaped screws instead of wheels or continuous track units to move across the snow. They were used (unsuccessfully) by Richard Byrd's first Antarctic Expedition.

==== Rail conversions ====
To displace both horses and steam from remote logging railways (bush trams), several enterprising inventors took the Fordson tractor and made modifications to allow them to run on rails. Extra bogies (wheel sets) were added behind and in front of some versions and acted as log bogies, whilst increasing traction on the light rail lines, without increasing weight. Dunedin company Trails Limited used the Fordson F as a base, adding a reverser, so the tractor could operate either way at the same speeds, and a powered bogie to act as a powered log bogie. Wellington company Nattrass advanced this design, and both companies' sales spelled the end of horse-operated bush trams in New Zealand. Nattrass also enjoyed sales in Australia. The last locomotive built by A&G Price, a noted steam and diesel locomotive builder was completed in 1970 and used a Fordson Major E1 as a base.

== Other Ford tractors ==
In the United States Ford reentered the tractor business in 1938 with the Ford N-series tractors. In 1953 this series was replaced by the Ford NAA tractors.

Starting around 1961, the U.S. tractor operations and the Ford Ltd U.K. tractor operations, which had been substantially independent although always in close communication, were reorganized into closer integration. After 1964, all tractors made by the Ford companies worldwide carried the Ford brand. In 1986, Ford expanded its tractor business when it purchased the Sperry-New Holland skid-steer loader and hay baler, hay tools and implement company from Sperry Corporation and formed Ford-New Holland which bought out Versatile tractors in 1988. In 1991 Ford sold its tractor division to Fiat with the agreement that they must stop using the Ford name by 2000. In 1999, Fiat removed all Ford identification from their blue tractors and renamed them "New Holland" tractors.

=== Tractor models ===
- Fordson Model F
- Fordson Model N
- Fordson All-Around (also called Fordson Row Crop)
- Fordson Major E27N
- Fordson New Major
- Fordson Dexta
- Fordson Power Major
- Fordson Super Major (called the Ford 5000 in U.S.)
- Fordson Super Dexta (called the Ford 2000 Diesel in U.S.)

== Trucks ==
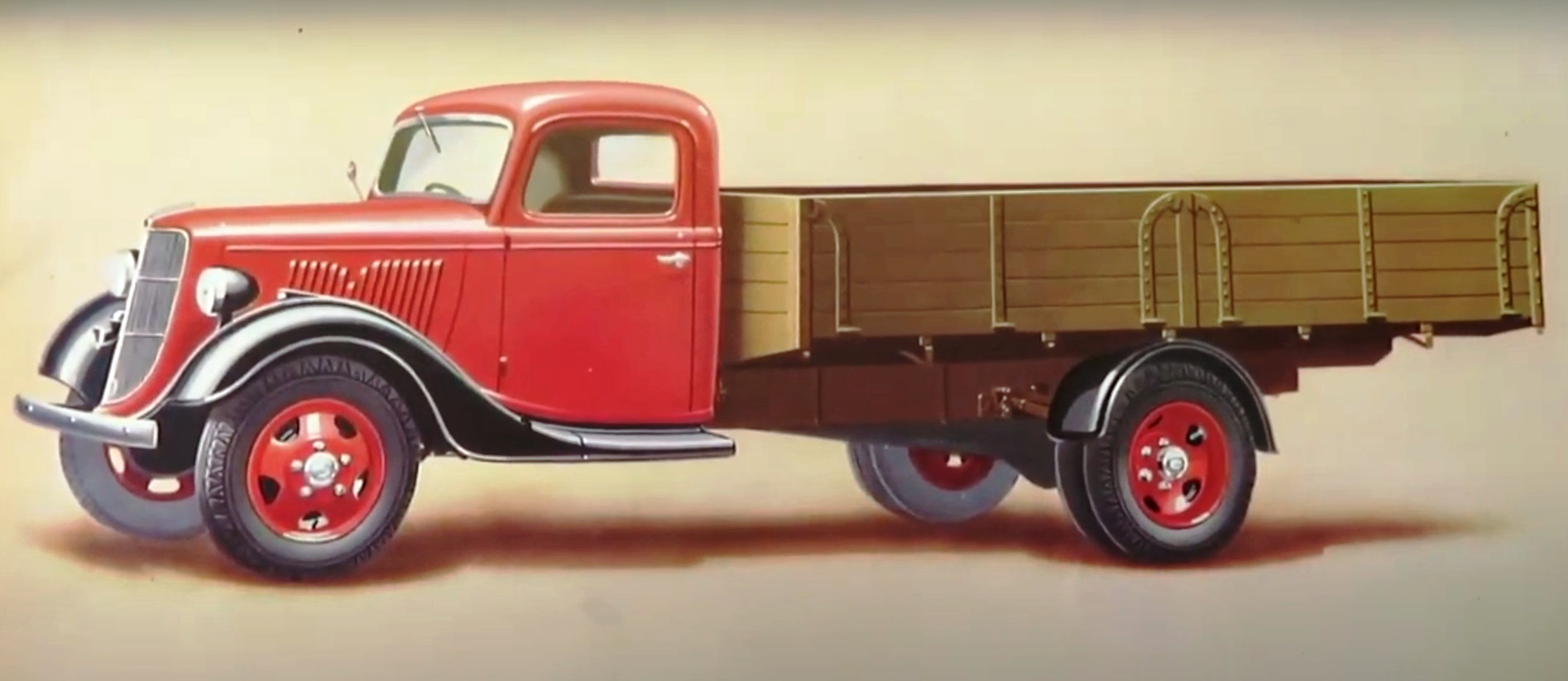
A 1935 Fordson 3-ton truck presented in a brochure

The first heavy-duty 2-ton truck ever built by Fordson was introduced in 1926. While there are many similarities between the Ford Model T and the Fordson, there are also distinct differences. The truck included front-end gears and suspensions similar to the Model T, however, the rear suspension was, according to Ford, the most unique feature in that it consisted of two cantilever springs with feather-edge axles. The engine was unique in that it was positioned under the cab and was far back in the chassis, so the truck had a snub-nose appearance. There was only one 1926 Fordson truck to ever be delivered to a customer and it was listed for sale on Mecum Auctions in 2019.

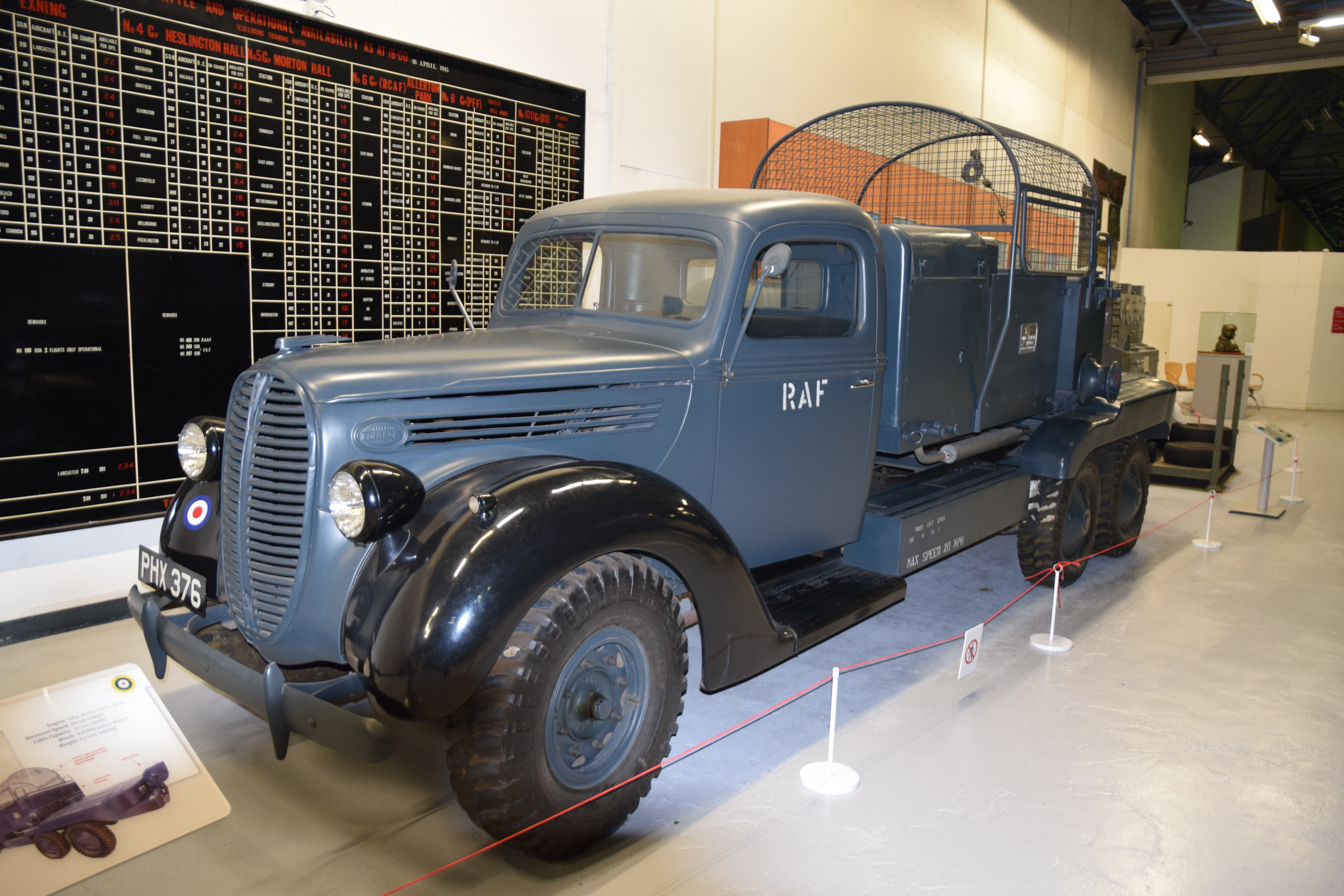
Fordson "Sussex" barrage balloon tender

The Fordson trucks were introduced as a brand in 1932 after the appearance of the Ford Model B engine and Ford Model BB chassis, although most models continued to be identified by the Ford brand. Production of a 2-ton truck began in 1934. The truck was powered by an 85 bhp V8 engine and was offered in the 4×2 version, as well as 6×2 and 6×4 factory conversions. In 1937, Ford Motor Company Ltd Dagenham announced a new design for the 2-ton and 3-ton trucks. The new design, offered with a 134-inch or a 157-inch wheelbase chassis, featured a new frontal appearance with a divided and slightly pointed windscreen. Other improvements were made to the engine, electrical system, and brakes. In 1939, Fordson Thames replaced the previous Fordson brand as to give it a more British identity.

The production of the Fordson truck range, which included models such as the Fordson Model 79, Fordson 7V, and Fordson WOT, started at the Ford facility in Dagenham where it continued until 1957 when the Fordson name was removed from the truck brand.

Another manufacturing facility for Fordson trucks was located in Romania, where the Fordson 157 truck chassis was produced at the Hagelstein factory in Bucharest. The trucks were assembled at the Ford Româna S.A.R. facility in Floreasca.

== General and cited references ==
- Beemer, Rod; Peterson, Chester (1997), Ford N Series Tractors, Osceola, WI, USA: MBI, ISBN 978-0-7603-0289-7.
- Bryan, Ford R. (2002), Friends, Families & Forays: Scenes from the Life and Times of Henry Ford, Detroit, MI, USA: Wayne State University Press, ISBN 0-8143-3108-4.
- Bryan, Ford R. (2003a), Henry's Lieutenants, Detroit, MI, USA: Wayne State University Press, ISBN 0-8143-3213-7.
- Bryan, Ford R. (2003b), Rouge: Pictured in Its Prime, Detroit, MI, USA: Wayne State University Press, ISBN 0-9727843-0-6.
- "Fordson tractor sales open big field for equipment and accessories", Chilton Tractor Journal, 8 (5): 12, May 1, 1922.
- "Implements, machinery and parts that have been designed for the Fordson tractor", Chilton Tractor Journal, 8 (5): 13–21, May 1, 1922.
- Ertel, Patrick W. (2001), The American Tractor: A Century of Legendary Machines, Minneapolis, MN, USA: MBI Publishing, ISBN 0-7603-0863-2.
- Ford, Henry; Crowther, Samuel (1922), My Life and Work, Garden City, New York, USA: Garden City Publishing Company, Inc. Various republications, including ISBN 9781406500189. Original is public domain in U.S. Also available at Google Books.
- Flink, James J. (1990), The Automobile Age, Cambridge, MA, USA: MIT Press, ISBN 0-262-56055-0.
- Klancher, Lee; Leffingwell, Randy; Morland, Andrew; Pripps, Robert N. (2003), Farm Tractors: John Deere, Farmall, Ford & Fordson, Crestline Imprints, ISBN 0-7603-1776-3.
- Leffingwell, Randy (1996), Classic Farm Tractors: History of the Farm Tractor, Osceola, WI, USA: Motorbooks International, ISBN 978-0-7603-0246-0.
- Leffingwell, Randy (2002) [1998], Ford Tractors, Borders, ISBN 0-681-87878-9.
- Leffingwell, Randy (1999), America's Classic Farm Tractors, Osceola, WI, USA: MBI, ISBN 978-0-7603-0822-6.
- Leffingwell, Randy (2003), Tractors: Icons of the American Landscape, St. Paul, MN, USA: Motorbooks, ISBN 978-0-7603-1505-7.
- Manly, Harold P. (1919), The Ford Motor Car and Truck; Fordson Tractor: Their Construction, Care and Operation, Chicago, IL, USA: Frederick J. Drake & Co.
- Pripps, Robert N.; Morland, Andrew (1990), Ford Tractors: N-Series, Fordson, Ford and Ferguson, 1914-1954, Osceola, WI, USA: MBI, ISBN 978-0-87938-471-5.
- Pripps, Robert N.; Morland, Andrew (photographer) (1993), Farmall Tractors: History of International McCormick-Deering Farmall Tractors, Farm Tractor Color History Series, Osceola, WI, USA: MBI, ISBN 978-0-87938-763-1.
- Wik, Reynold M. (1972), "V - Henry Ford's Tractors and Agriculture", Henry Ford and Grass-Roots America, Ann Arbor, MI, USA: University of Michigan Press, ISBN 0-472-06193-3.
- Pripps, Robert N.; Morland, Andrew (photographer) (2004), Ford Tractors, Farm Tractor Color History Series, Voyager Press, ISBN 978-0760320631
