= Nebraska Tractor Test Laboratory =

Research institute at the University of Nebraska–Lincoln

Coordinates: 40°49′58.75″N 96°40′14.33″W

The Nebraska Tractor Test Laboratory (NTTL) is a program operated by the University of Nebraska–Lincoln in accordance with Nebraska law to test the performance of agricultural equipment that is to be sold in the United States for compliance with OECD standards. The NTTL has operated since 1920 as the common standard reference for tractor performance in the United States.

== History ==
Impetus for the Nebraska Tractor Test Act of 1919, or Nebraska Tractor Law, came from a Nebraska farmer, Wilmot F. Crozier, who had been disappointed with the performance of several tractors he had bought. One had been marketed as a Ford tractor, but the Ford Tractor Company of the time was completely unrelated to the Ford Motor Company, and its products were of poor quality. The new law was enacted to address problems of false advertising of tractor features and capabilities, requiring that all agricultural tractors sold in Nebraska must have their performance verified by three engineers. The laboratory was established in 1920 at the University of Nebraska as a central location for tractor testing. The first tractor to be tested at the NTTL was a Waterloo Boy, which passed the test.

All tractors sold in Nebraska had to be tested at the NTTL. In consequence, the Nebraska Tractor Test became a standard reference for tractors sold in North America. Tests initially focused on drawbar pull, measuring pulling power for plows and other towed implements, and belt horsepower, for operating as a power source for belt-operated external equipment such as threshing machines. As power take-offs became available the tests included those features, and gradually expanded to include operating convenience, fuel consumption, and operator comfort.

In 1980 the original facility became a museum, and the NTTL moved to a new facility at the University of Nebraska–Lincoln. The NTTL is the location of OECD testing and certification for tractors in the United States.

== Lester F. Larson Tractor Test and Power Museum ==
The original NTTL facility was dedicated as the Lester F. Larsen Tractor Museum in 1980, and in 1998 named for the NTTL's chief engineer from 1946 to 1975.
