= The First Tractor =

The First Tractor is the title of works of the following authors:

- Tamara Abakeliya, painting
- Valentin Chekmasov, painting
- Boris Goller, play
- Asya Gorskaya, song
- Vladimir Krikhatsky, painting
- Gernnady Larishev, painting
- German Melentyev, painting
- Fyodor Modorov, painting
- Ernst Saitov, etching
- Aleksandr Shumilkin, etching
- Nikita Sverchkov, painting
- Viktor Tsigal, repoussé and chasing (metalwork), 1987 Repin RSFSR State Prize
- Ivan Zubkov), painting
- Vladimir Yelchaninov, painting

== See also ==
- First Tractor, a Chinese manufacturer of agricultural machinery
