= Eugene Farkas =

Hungarian-American automotive engineer

Eugene Farkas (born Jenő Farkas; October 28, 1881 – February 24, 1963) was a Hungarian-American automotive engineer, most known for designing the Ford Model T and Fordson tractors.

== Early life and education ==
Farkas was born in Káld, Austria-Hungary, in 1881. He was the second eldest son of Károly and Anna Farkas, and one of ten children. Károly was a wagon builder. The family moved to Jánoshalma in 1886 and later moved on to Szarvas. Eugene attended six years of compulsory school plus four years of military school and then moved to Budapest to study at a grammar school. Through the support and kindness of a maternal uncle he was able to afford to attend the Royal Joseph Technical University, from which he graduated with a degree in Certified Mechanical Engineering.

== Career ==
After qualifying at university Farkas completed one year of military service after which he worked in a motorcycle factory, unpaid, in order to get experience. In 1906 Farkas and a friend left Hungary to travel to the United States. With only 17 words of English the young Hungarian landed in New York where he read the situations vacant and secured a position with Maxwell-Briscoe in Tarrytown, New York. After six months, during which Farkas had taken English lessons he decided he wanted to work in innovative motor vehicle design, to this end he wrote to Ford and Packard. Walter Flanders of Ford replied, and in September 1907 Farkas started to work for Ford. This was not a long lived position because Farkas was not employed as an experimental draughtsman, after only two months Farkas moved on to work for Cadillac but due to the Panic of 1907 Farkas was soon out of work. He started work with the Morgan Engineering Co., in Alliance, Ohio where again the Panic of 1907 caused him to lose his job. He was affected by much of the descrimination regarding European immigrants, who were often seen as a subpar class of white people.

Early 1908, saw Farkas back at Ford working on the design of tools and fixtures for the Model T. An unfortunate altercation with a fellow employee, named Haltenberger, caused Farkas to be dismissed. He went on to work for many other great names in the American motor industry: Packard, Oldsmobile, Oakland, Rapid Motor Vehicle Company, Cartercar Company and Hudson. When General Motors bought out the Cartercar company on October 26, 1909 Farkas became the chief engineer for Cartercar, a position he held for three years. Moving on once again, Farkas went to work for the Cass Motor Vehicle Co. designing trucks, but this was not a long-term future for the young Hungarian.

By 1911, Farkas was living in Pontiac, Livingston County, Illinois, where he married Helen Louise Parshall. The couple had four sons: Raymond Zoltan (born 1912), Louis Eugen (born 1914), Don Earl (born 1917) and Robert Lawrence (born 1919). By 1913 Farkas had returned to work for Ford and the family had moved to Detroit. On October 1, 1915 Charles Sorenson had been asked by Henry Ford to oversee the development of a Ford tractor, a new design away from the converted Model T, which had been produced. Sorenson chose Eugene Farkas as his chief engineer for the project. Farkas was innovative in his designs, following the Wallis Tractor Co example of frameless construction, he improved the principle and set an industry standard which lasts to the modern day. The three-speed transmission was specifically designed by Farkas for the rigours of agriculture. Final drive was by worm gear, which was another Farkas design.

Farkas was involved in the war effort of Ford during World War I. In 1918, he designed an aircraft engine and he was involved in early US military tank design. He worked on the Ford X configuration engine, which was a favorite of Henry Ford, but which was not a great success. Using expertise honed on such projects Farkas also worked on the Model A B-24 bomber and a 12 cylinder radial aircraft engine. The latter was never built.

== Retirement and death ==
By 1947, Farkas had completed his engineering career. He and Helen moved to Laguna Beach, Orange County, California to retire. They were both keen dancers, Eugene occasionally entertained Henry Ford with a traditional Hungarian dance. Eugene enjoyed fishing and playing the flute or piccolo.

Farkas died on February 24, 1963. His widow Helen Louise Farkas (née Parshall) died on November 11, 1974.
