= Viktor Tsigal =

Viktor Efimovich Tsigal (Russian: Виктор Ефимович Цигаль; May 21, 1916 – March 21, 2005) was a Soviet painter.

Tsigal was born into a Jewish family in Odessa in 1916.

He became a noted painter and produced a large body of work in the socialist realist style.
