= Ford Tractor Company =

Defunct American tractor company

Ford Tractor Company was a Minneapolis-based company active from 1916 to 1917, that built tractors to facilitate "horseless farming".

== History ==
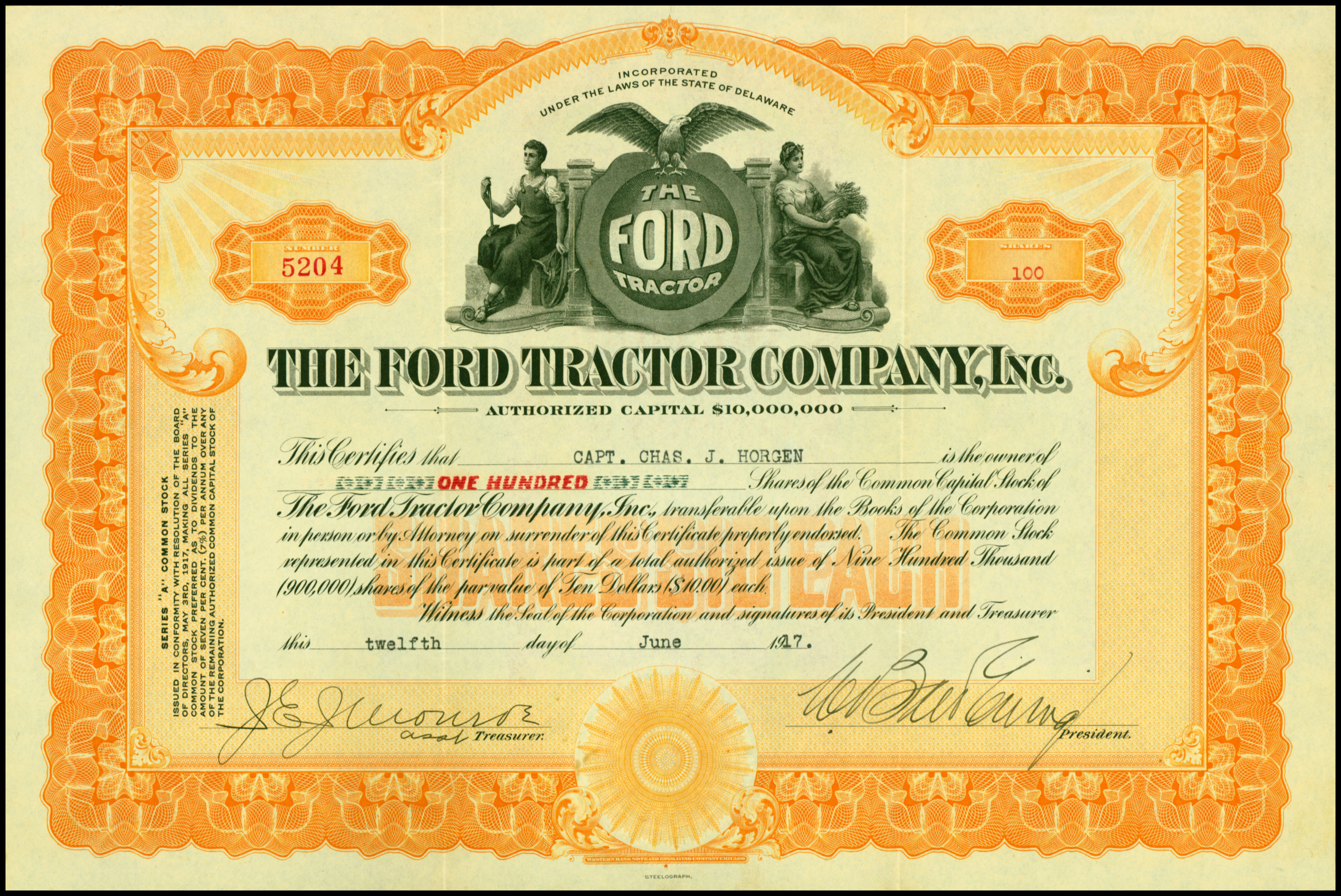
Share of the Ford Tractor Company, issued 12. June 1917

Ford Tractor Company was incorporated on March 15, 1915, by W. Baer Ewing and Paul W. Ford. Prior to founding the company, Ewing worked in the insurance business. The choice of name has been assessed as deceptive by later commentators. Businessman W. Baer Ewing had hired tractor designer Robert Kinkaid to develop his product line, but named the company after one Paul Ford, a local hardware clerk Ewing had hired, allegedly to leverage the Ford name to take advantage of customer confusion with Henry Ford. The company may have hoped for a quick settlement with Henry Ford to acquire the name, but instead Henry Ford marketed his own line of tractors, beginning in 1916, under the brand name Fordson.

On, June 19, 1916, Paul Ford was relieved of his duties with the company but still continued to receive compensation.

== Nebraska Tractor Law ==
An unsatisfactory Ford tractor was partly responsible for the establishment of the Nebraska Tractor Test Laboratory. Nebraska farmer Wilmot F. Crozier's experience with the Ford and other tractors caused him to advocate for the establishment of testing requirements to verify tractor performance. In 1919 a law was passed in Nebraska mandating that tractors be tested on a standardized basis in order to be sold in the state.

== Documentary ==
The company is the subject of a silent educational documentary produced in 1917, Horseless Farming With Ford Tractors.
