= Massey family =

Canadian business and arts family

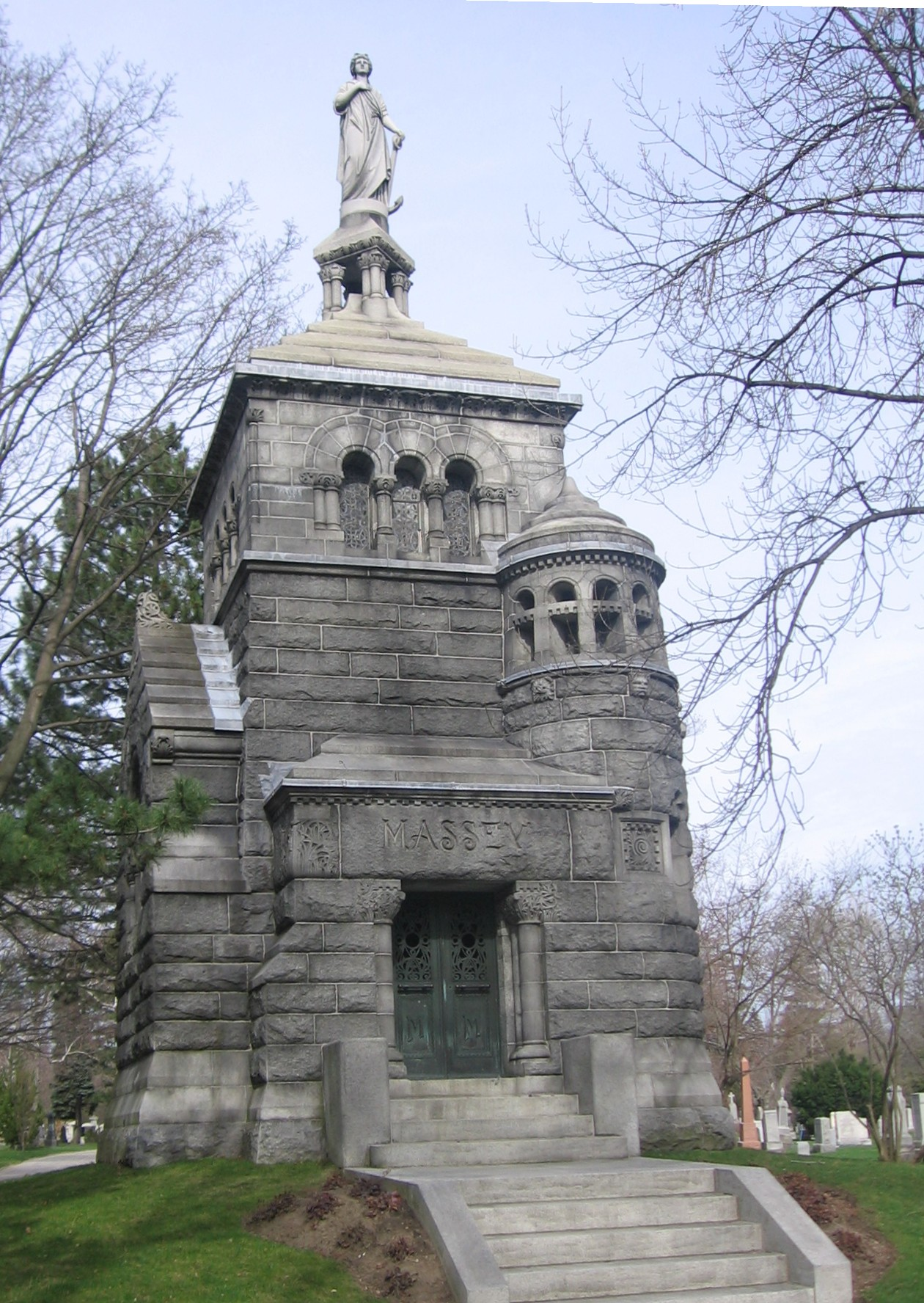
The mausoleum of Hart Massey at Mount Pleasant Cemetery, Toronto

The Massey family is a Canadian family with Methodist roots that has been prominent since the mid-19th century, known for manufacturing farm equipment and for being patrons of the arts in Canada. The family's manufacturing company, later known as Massey Ferguson, provided the Masseys with their significant fortune. Subsequent generations of Masseys have risen to prominence in the arts, philanthropy and governance. The Massey name remains visible through institutions such as Massey Hall, Massey College and the Massey Lectures.

== History ==
The Masseys had been in North America since the 17th century, when Jeffrey Massey (1591–1676) migrated from England to the Massachusetts colony in the 1630s to work as a surveyor. The Masseys continued to live in Massachusetts for several generations and fought in the American Revolutionary War. During the first decade of the 19th century, Daniel Massey (1766–1832) and his wife, Rebecca Kelley (1765–1838), moved their family to Haldimand Township in Upper Canada to farm.

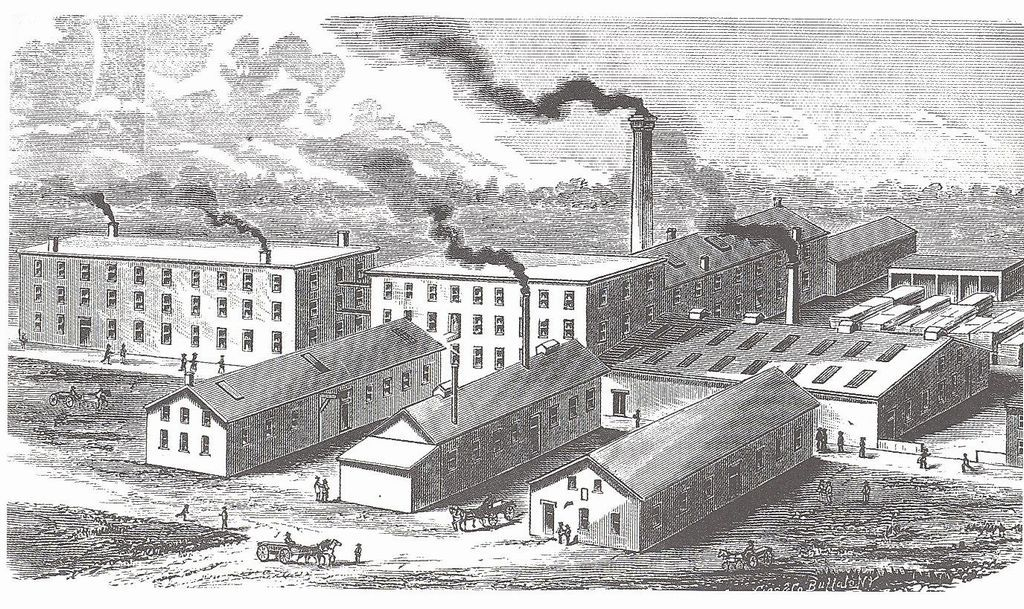
Illustration of the Massey Factory in Newcastle, circa 1879.

In 1847, their son Daniel Massey, Jr. (1798–1856) established the Newcastle Foundry and Machine Manufactory in what is now Newcastle, Ontario. The enterprise was subsequently renamed as the Massey Manufacturing Co. and, in 1879, moved to Toronto, Ontario.

In 1891, the Massey Manufacturing Co. merged with A. Harris, Son and Company to form Massey-Harris, which became the largest agricultural equipment maker in the British Empire. The company eventually became Massey-Harris-Ferguson as a result of a 1953 merger with the Ferguson Company, a British agricultural machinery firm. The company's name was shortened to Massey Ferguson in 1958. After running into financial difficulties during the 1980s, the company closed its Toronto operations in the 1990s. By 2000, the company became part of the American conglomerate AGCO, which continues the Massey Ferguson brand of farm equipment today.

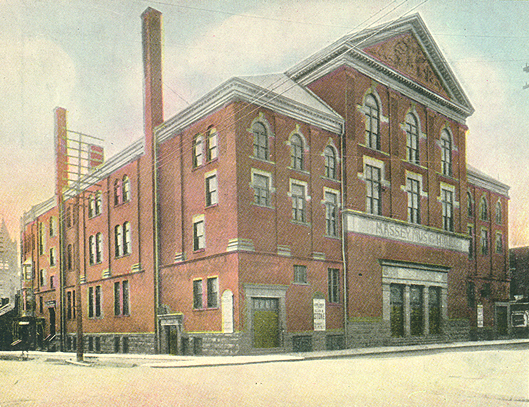
Postcard of Massey Music Hall in Toronto, circa 1910.

In 1894, Hart Massey built Massey Hall, a performing arts theatre in Toronto, in memory of his late son, Charles Albert Massey (1848–1884), who loved music.

On 8 February 1915, Charles' son, Charles Albert "Bert" Massey II (1880–1915), was shot to death by Carrie Davies (c. 1897–1961), his 18-year-old British maid, sparking a trial of the century in Canada. Davies, who was ultimately found not guilty, claimed that she shot Bert because she was afraid that he wanted to sexually assault her.

In 1918, the family incorporated the Massey Foundation, which was responsible for the construction of various Toronto landmarks and was the first trust of its kind in Canada. In 1919, Vincent Massey, an alumnus and benefactor of the University of Toronto, initiated and financed at the university one of the earliest student centres in North America, naming it Hart House after his grandfather.

In 1952, Vincent would be sworn in as Governor General of Canada.

In 1962, the Massey Foundation established, built, and partially endowed Massey College, a graduate residential college at the University of Toronto.

In 1975, Massey Hall was municipally designated as a historic site under the Ontario Heritage Act. On 15 June 1981, Massey Hall was designated a National Historic Site of Canada. Starting in July 2018, Massey Hall underwent a two-year restoration project to restore and renew both the interior and exterior of the building, improve patron amenities and accessibility, open two new music venues, and enable the return of the building's original stained glass windows from 1894.

In 1978, the family was the subject of a two-part CBC TV documentary, The Masseys: Chronicles of a Canadian Family, produced by Vincent Tovell, a grandson of Walter Massey, with music by Louis Applebaum.

== Family tree ==
- Daniel Massey (1798–1856) ⚭ Lucena Bradley (1803–1872)
  - Elvira Deborah Massey ⚭ Orrin Wentworth Powell (1820–1904)
  - Albert Massey (1822–1849)
  - Hart Almerrin Massey (1823–1896) ⚭ Eliza Ann Phelps (1823–1908)
    - Charles Albert Massey (1848–1884) ⚭ Jessie Fremont Arnold (1853–1894)
      - Eugene A. Massey (1871-1871)
      - Arthur Lyman Massey (1874–1936) ⚭ Mary Ethel Bonnell (1875–1951)
        - Arnold Bonnell Massey (1897–1984) ⚭ Dorothy Dewey (1898–1983)
        - Dorothy Bonnell Massey (1904–1984) ⚭ Stanford Elmore Dack (1891–1977)
      - Charles Albert Massey (1880–1915) ⚭ Frances Rhoda Vandegrift (1880–1957)
        - Charles Albert Massey (1900–1975) ⚭ Audrey Eileen Hewitt (1898–1995)
    - Chester Daniel Massey (1850–1926) ⚭ Anna Dobbins Vincent (1860–1903)
      - Charles Vincent Massey (1887–1967) ⚭ Alice Stuart Parkin (1879–1950)
        - Lionel Chester Hart Massey (1916–1965) ⚭ Lilias Evva Ahearn (1918–1998)
        - Hart Parkin Vincent Massey II (1918–1996) ⚭ Melodie Frances Willis-O'Connor (1923–2016)
      - Raymond Massey (1896–1983) ⚭ Margery Hilda Fremantle (1900–1989) [div. 1929]; ⚭ Adrianne Allen (1907–1993) [div. 1939]
        - Geoffrey Massey (1924–2020) ⚭ Ruth Maud Killam (1928–2018)
          - Raymond Massey
          - Vincent Massey
          - Nathaniel Massey
          - Eliza Massey
        - Daniel Massey (1933–1998) ⚭ Adrienne Corri (1931–2016) [div. 1967]; ⚭ Penelope Wilton (1946–) [div. 1984]
          - Alice Massey
        - Anna Massey (1937–2011) ⚭ Jeremy Brett (1933–1995)
          - David Raymond William Huggins (1959–)
    - George Wentworth Massey (1853–1854)
    - Lillian Frances Massey (1854–1915) ⚭ John Mill Treble (1846–1909)
      - Charles Edward Treble (1876–1919) ⚭ Violet Patterson (1876–1923)
        - Lillian Marian Treble (1908–1930)
        - Marjorie Violet Treble (1909–1983)
        - Dorothy Elizabeth Treble (1911–2001) ⚭ Donald S. Umphrey (1910–1980)
        - Laura L. Treble (1918–1994)
      - Ethel May Treble (1878–1946) ⚭ Frank Louis Barber (1877–1945)
    - Walter Edward Hart Massey (1864–1901) ⚭ Susan Marie Denton (1863–1938)
      - Ruth Lillian Massey (1889–1961) ⚭ Harold Thomas Murchison Tovell (1889–1961)
        - Walter Massey Tovell (1916–2005) ⚭ Anita Faessler (1916–1975)
        - Harold Murchison Massey Tovell (1919–2001) ⚭ Elizabeth Davidson (1921–1995)
          - Harold Murchison Tovell (1952–1973)
          - Craig Massey Tovell (1955–1977)
      - Madeline Massey (1896–1965) ⚭ James Edward Reid Knox (1890–1971)
        - James Edward Massey Knox (1921–2006) ⚭ Rosemary Savary (1923–2017)
      - Dorothy Massey (1898–1972) ⚭ Arthur Melville Goulding (1889–1969)
        - Helen Goulding (1917–1997) ⚭ ? Lloyd
        - Ann Goulding (1919–2007) ⚭ Frederick E. Coombs (–1976)
      - Denton Massey (1900–1984) ⚭ Esther Jeralds (1900–1984)
        - Elizabeth Massey (1923–2013) ⚭ Louis Paul Breithaupt (1922–2005)
        - Walter Edward Hart Massey (1928–2014)
    - Frederick Victor Massey (1867–1890)
  - Eliza Jane Massey (1829–1888) ⚭ Elias R. Ferguson (1830–1888)
    - Clarence H Ferguson (1854–1888) ⚭ Minerva A. Male (1854–1895)
    - Edwin Arthur Ferguson (1862–1932) ⚭ Mary Conant (1868–1934)
    - Willie W. Ferguson (1874–1874)
  - Frances Massey (1835–1880) ⚭ William Taylor Boate (1825–1865)
    - Mary Rosalie Boate (1859-1862)
    - Ida Emma Boate (1861–1927) ⚭ John Carrick (1852–1928)
    - William Massey Boate (1862-1862)
  - Jonathan Benjamin Massey (1836–1837)
  - Alida Massey (1847–1896)

== Legacy ==
The following are some of the various structures and other entities in Canada named in honour of members of the Massey family.

Buildings/venues:

- Fred Victor Centre — named in honour of Frederick Victor Massey (1867-1890)
- Hart House at the University of Toronto — named in honour of Hart Massey (1823–1896) by his grandson, Vincent Massey (1887–1967), 18th Governor General of Canada, who was an alumnus and benefactor of the university
  - Hart House Theatre
  - Newcastle Community Hall-The Neo-Georgian brick and stone building was designed by Sproat and Rolfe, A
- Lillian Massey Building — named in honour of Lillian Massey Treble (1854–1915). It was built between 1908 and 1912 for the University of Toronto's Household Science program created by Lillian. It presently houses the offices of the University's Division of University Advancement, Department of Classics and Centre for Medieval Studies, as well as the Toronto flagship store of Club Monaco.
- Massey Centre for Women (originally called the Fred Victor Mission in 1900 then The Victor Home for Women in 1904) — in honour of Hart Massey’s youngest child, Frederick Victor Massey (1867–1890), after his brother Chester Daniel Massey donated a parsonage. In 1989, it was incorporated as the Massey Centre for Women.
- Massey Hall — a performing arts theatre funded by Hart Massey in 1894 to honour the memory of his late son, Charles Albert Massey (1848-1884), who loved music
- Massey Library at Royal Military College of Canada—named after Vincent Massey
- Newcastle Community Hall - The Neo-Georgian brick and stone building was designed by Sproat and Rolfe, Architects, who were also responsible for such significant structures as Hart House and Bishop Strachan School Toronto. Constructed in 1923, it was a gift to the community by Mr. Chester Massey, a native of Newcastle, and the grandson of Daniel Massey of the Massey Harris Company.

Locations:

- Massey Drive — a town in Newfoundland and Labrador
- Vincent Massey Park — a park in Ottawa, Ontario
- Massey Place — a neighbourhood in Saskatoon, Saskatchewan
- Taylor-Massey Creek — a tributary of the Don River in Toronto, Ontario

Organizations and other:

- City Dairy Company Limited — founded by Walter Edward Hart Massey (1864–1901)
- Massey Commission
- Massey Foundation
- Massey Manufacturing Co. — agricultural equipment manufacturer
- Massey Medal

Schools:

- Vincent Massey High School, in Brandon, Manitoba
- Vincent Massey Collegiate, in Winnipeg, Manitoba
- Vincent Massey Collegiate Institute, a former school in Etobicoke, Ontario
- Vincent Massey Public School, in Ottawa, Ontario
- Massey College at the University of Toronto — founded by Vincent Massey. The Massey Foundation, of which Vincent served as a trustee, provided the financial endowment to build the college in 1962.
  - Massey Lectures
- Vincent Massey Secondary School, in Windsor, Ontario
- Vincent Massey Collegiate, in Montreal, Quebec
- Vincent Massey Public School, in Saskatoon, Saskatchewan

== See also ==
- Massey Foundation
- Massey Lectures
- Massey Medal
