= Daniel Massey (manufacturer) =

American-born Canadian blacksmith and businessman

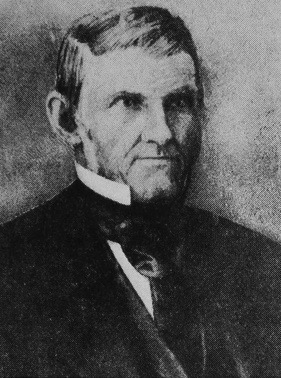
- Born: 24 February 1798; Windsor, Vermont, U.S.
- Died: 15 November 1856 (aged 58); Newcastle, Canada West
- Resting place: Bowmanville Cemetery, Clarington, Ontario
- Occupations: Blacksmith, businessman
- Spouse: Lucina Bradley (m. 1820)
- Children: 10, including Hart

Daniel Massey (24 February 1798 – 15 November 1856) was an American-born Canadian blacksmith and businessman in what is now Newcastle, Ontario. A member of the Massey family and a farm machinery pioneer, Massey began production of agricultural implements in 1847 and established what grew into Massey Ferguson.

== Early life ==
Massey was born in Windsor, Vermont in 1798 to Daniel Massey Sr. and Rebecca Kelley. The family relocated to Upper Canada sometime between 1802 and 1807, likely to acquire cheap land, as many Americans were doing at the time. They settled on a farm in Haldimand Township near present-day Grafton. As a child, Massey was sent to live with relatives in Watertown, New York, where he attended school. He returned to Upper Canada by age 14, at which point he took over the family farm while his father and older brothers joined the Upper Canadian Militia to fight in the War of 1812. He had two older brothers, one of whom died in the war, and at least one sister.

Massey was a seventh-generation North American, descended from Puritans from Cheshire, England. Geoffrey Massy arrived in America around 1630, first in Essex, Massachusetts, and later in New Hampshire and Watertown, New York.

== Career ==
Massey left home in 1817 at age 19 and spent several years clearing land for farms, which he then sold. In 1830, he settled down in Haldimand to care for his own farm. The same year, he brought a mechanical thresher, "one of the first... if not the very first imported into Upper Canada", back from a visit to Watertown; this was the start of his work on and fascination with farm implements.

In 1844, Massey's son Hart took over the farm, while Massey himself tinkered with repairing implements in a workshop on the property. He sold the farm to Hart in 1847 and moved to the Newcastle area, where he partnered with Richard F. Vaughan, owner of a struggling foundry and blacksmith shop in Bond Head. In 1849, he bought Vaughan's share of the company and moved to a larger facility in Newcastle, where he set up the Newcastle Foundry and Machine Manufactory. His son Hart joined the company as a superintendent in 1851, becoming a partner in 1853 and sole owner in 1856 when his father retired.

Though Massey and his business were not prominent during his lifetime, the Newcastle Foundry and Machine Manufactory thrived. In 1870, Massey Manufacturing Company outgrew its Newcastle workshop and moved to Toronto. The firm merged with its main competitor, A. Harris, Son and Company Limited in 1891, at which point it became Massey-Harris, which produced the world's first commercially successful self-propelled combine harvester in 1938. Massey-Harris purchased the Ferguson Company in 1953 to form Massey-Harris-Ferguson, which was shortened to Massey Ferguson in 1958. The company continued to grow and remains a top multinational farm implement manufacturer. The business was headed by Hart and his descendants until 1926.

Massey was inducted into the Ontario Agricultural Hall of Fame in 1981 after being nominated by Massey Ferguson.

== Personal life ==
Massey married his childhood sweetheart Lucina Bradley in 1820. A Methodist family, they had three sons and seven daughters. He died on 15 November 1856 in Newcastle and is buried at Bowmanville Cemetery in Clarington, Ontario.

Lillian Massey Treble was Massey's granddaughter and Edward Wentworth Beatty was his grandson via daughter Elvira Deborah Massey. His great-grandchildren included Vincent Massey and Raymond Massey, and his great-great-grandchildren included actors Daniel and Anna Massey, architect Geoffrey Massey, and civil servant Lionel Massey.
