= Lillian Massey Building =

Building at Victoria University, Toronto

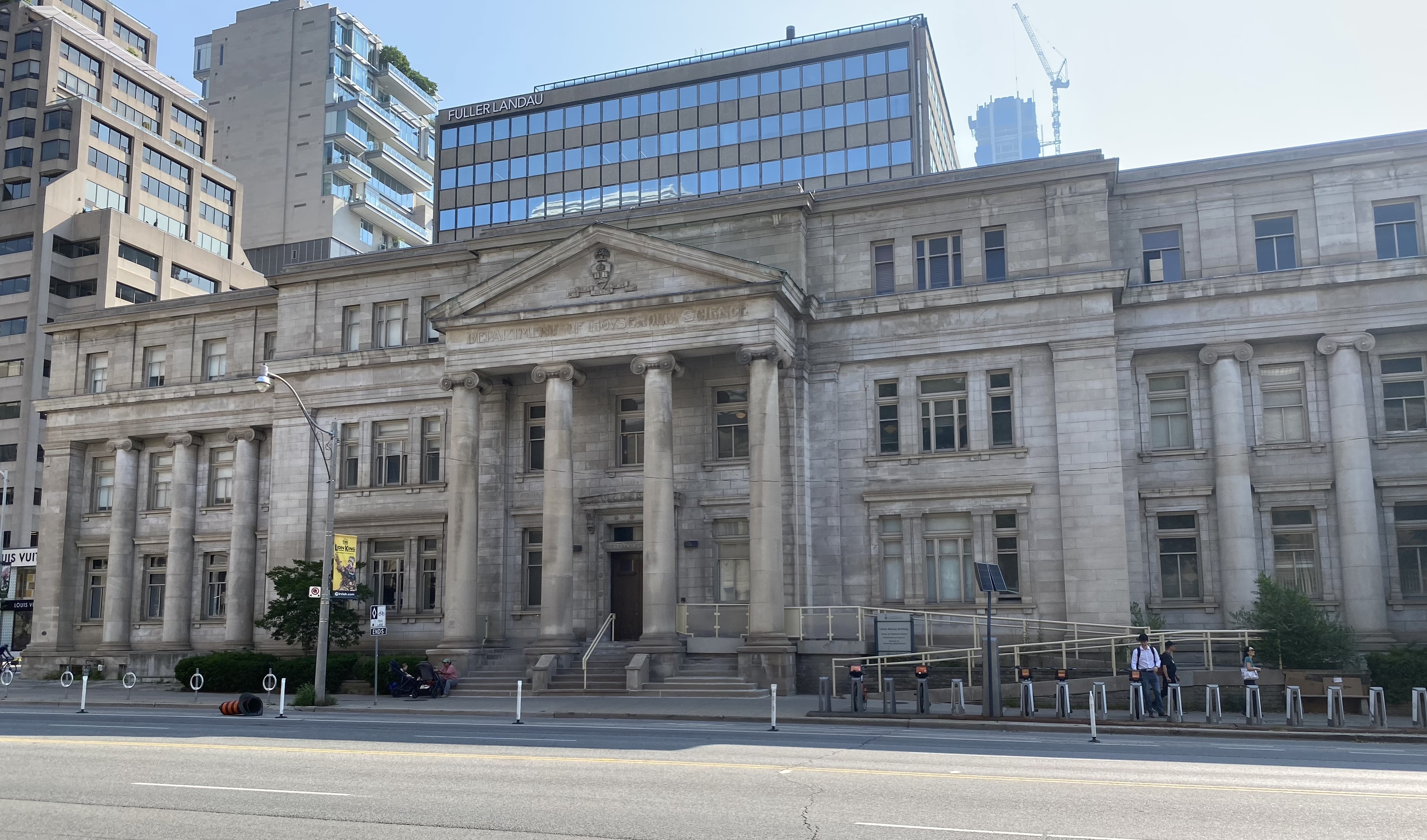
- The Lillian Massey Building in 2025
- Interactive map of the Lillian Massey Building area
- Former names: Department of Household Science

General information
- Location: 153 Bloor St. West, Toronto, ON
- Coordinates: 43°40′06″N 79°23′37″W
- Completed: 1913; 113 years ago
- Owner: Victoria University

Design and construction
- Architect: George M. Miller

Other information
- Public transit: at Museum

Ontario Heritage Act
- Criteria: Designated Part IV
- Designated: March 17, 1976
- Reference no.: 1792

The Lillian Massey Building is a Neoclassical building located in Downtown Toronto. It is situated on the St. George campus of the University of Toronto, on land owned by Victoria University. It sits at the southeast corner of Queen's Park and Bloor Street along the Mink Mile and across from the Royal Ontario Museum. It was designed by architect George Martell Miller (1855–1933) and built between 1908 and 1912 for the University of Toronto's Household Science program created by Lillian Massey Treble, daughter of wealthy Canadian business man, Hart Massey.

It presently houses the offices of the University of Toronto's Department of Classics and Centre for Medieval Studies and the offices of the University of Toronto's Division of University Advancement. Part of the building previously housed Club Monaco’s flagship retail store until 2021.

The building was designated under the Ontario Heritage Act on March 17, 1976.

== Architecture ==
Designed by George Martell Miller in the Neoclassical style, the building features Indiana Limestone facades with columns topped with Ionic capitals. There are several pediments including one supported by columns forming the grand portico fronting Queen's Park. The interior of the University of Toronto part of the building has been kept almost unchanged, featuring marble tile flooring and finishes, while the Club Monaco interiors were modified to fit the needs of a retail store.

Fort Architects renovated the interior of Club Monaco's part of the building with drywall and hardwood flooring before installing shelves. The original underground pool was covered by a false floor to house the men's section of the store. Landscaping was kept to a minimum as tree planters were used in front of the Club Monaco facade to frame its entrance.
