= Massey Hall =

Concert hall in Toronto, Canada

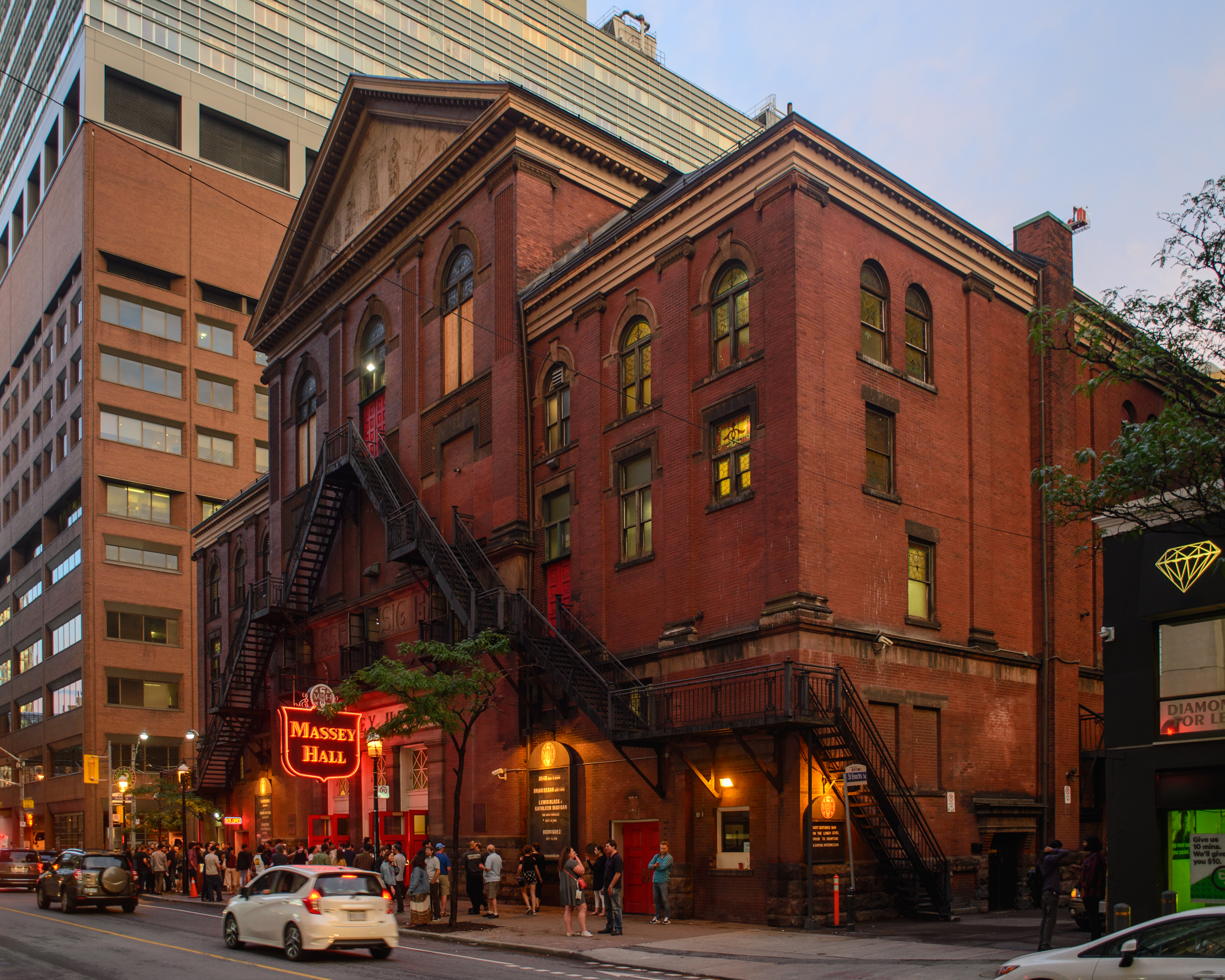
- Massey Hall in 2017
- Interactive map of Massey Hall
- Address: 178 Victoria Street
- Location: Toronto, Ontario, Canada
- Coordinates: 43°39′15″N 79°22′44.50″W
- Owner: The Corporation of Massey Hall and Roy Thomson Hall
- Capacity: 2,752
- Type: Concert hall
- Public transit: 501 97C

Construction
- Opened: July 14, 1894
- Years active: 1894–present
- Architect: Sidney Badgley

Website
- masseyhall.com

National Historic Site of Canada
- Official name: Massey Hall National Historic Site of Canada
- Designated: June 15, 1981

Ontario Heritage Act
- Type: Municipally-designated
- Designated: 1975

Massey Hall is a performing arts auditorium located within the Garden District in Toronto, Ontario, Canada. Opened in 1894, it is known for its outstanding acoustics and was the long-time hall of the Toronto Symphony Orchestra and the Toronto Mendelssohn Choir. Although originally designed to seat 3,500 patrons, after extensive renovations in 1933 its capacity was reduced to 2,765. Its extensive history includes concerts by many of the most famous artists of the past century and more, across many musical genres, which is a pattern that continues to the present day.

Massey Hall was a gift to the people of Toronto from industrialist Hart Massey. Massey Hall was designated a National Historic Site of Canada on June 15, 1981. The hall closed in July 2018 for a two-year-long renovation and restoration. The project includes a new seven-storey addition, titled the Allied Music Centre, which contains a new concert space on the fourth floor, a smaller theatre space on the sixth floor, and a performance studio on the seventh floor. Massey Hall's re-opening was delayed by the COVID-19 pandemic until 2021. The capacity of the main hall is currently 2,534 seated and 2,800 standing, with the capacity of the new TD Music Hall being 245 seated and 450 standing.

It is operated by The Corporation of Massey Hall and Roy Thomson Hall, a non-profit charitable organization. It is located at the intersection of Shuter and Victoria Streets, just east of Yonge Street, in downtown Toronto.

== History ==
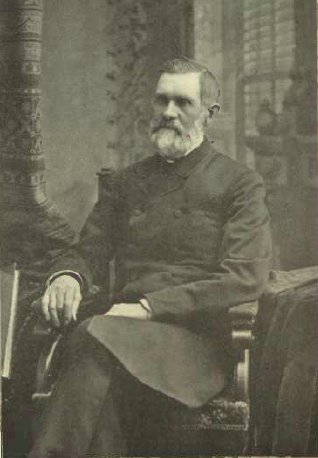
The idea for Massey Hall began with Hart Massey.

The idea of Massey Music Hall (its original name) began with Hart Massey, who wanted to build a music hall in order to fill the need for a secular meeting place where people from Toronto and area could meet and enjoy choral music not of a religious theme. Massey also wanted to construct the building in memory of his son Charles, who loved music. Massey also did not want the music hall to make large profits. He wanted both rich and poor to attend events. Ideally, once all expenses were paid, Massey wanted tickets for a season of lectures to sell for $1.

The building was designed with a neoclassical facade and features Moorish arches that span the width of the interior hall. This interior was inspired by the Alhambra Palace in Spain as well as Louis Sullivan's Chicago Auditorium. The exterior is Palladian architecture while the interior is Moorish Revival architecture. The exterior neoclassical facade was a preference voiced from Lillian, Hart Massey's daughter. Around the top of the hall are thirty stained glass windows, each depicting a famous composer made by the Faircloth Brothers glass firm. The foyer is finished in Art Deco style.

Designed by architect Sidney Badgley, Massey Hall was completed in 1894 at a cost of CA$152,390.75. Construction was financed by Massey, the founder of the Massey Manufacturing (later Massey Ferguson) manufacturing conglomerate. The hall's debut concert was a choral performance of Handel's 'Messiah' on June 14, 1894.

Ten years after the completion of construction (after the 1904 Toronto Great Fire), a pair of fire escape staircases were installed along the front face of the building. They were installed to deal with fire concerns of the building. These fire escapes (now removed) were considered an iconic part of Massey Hall's exterior. At some point in its renovation history, three of the windows at the front of the venue were converted into doors. The doors at the front of the venue were painted red (from their earlier brown-gold colour), a giant neon sign was hung above the main entrance, and notice boards listing upcoming acts were revamped on either side of those doors.

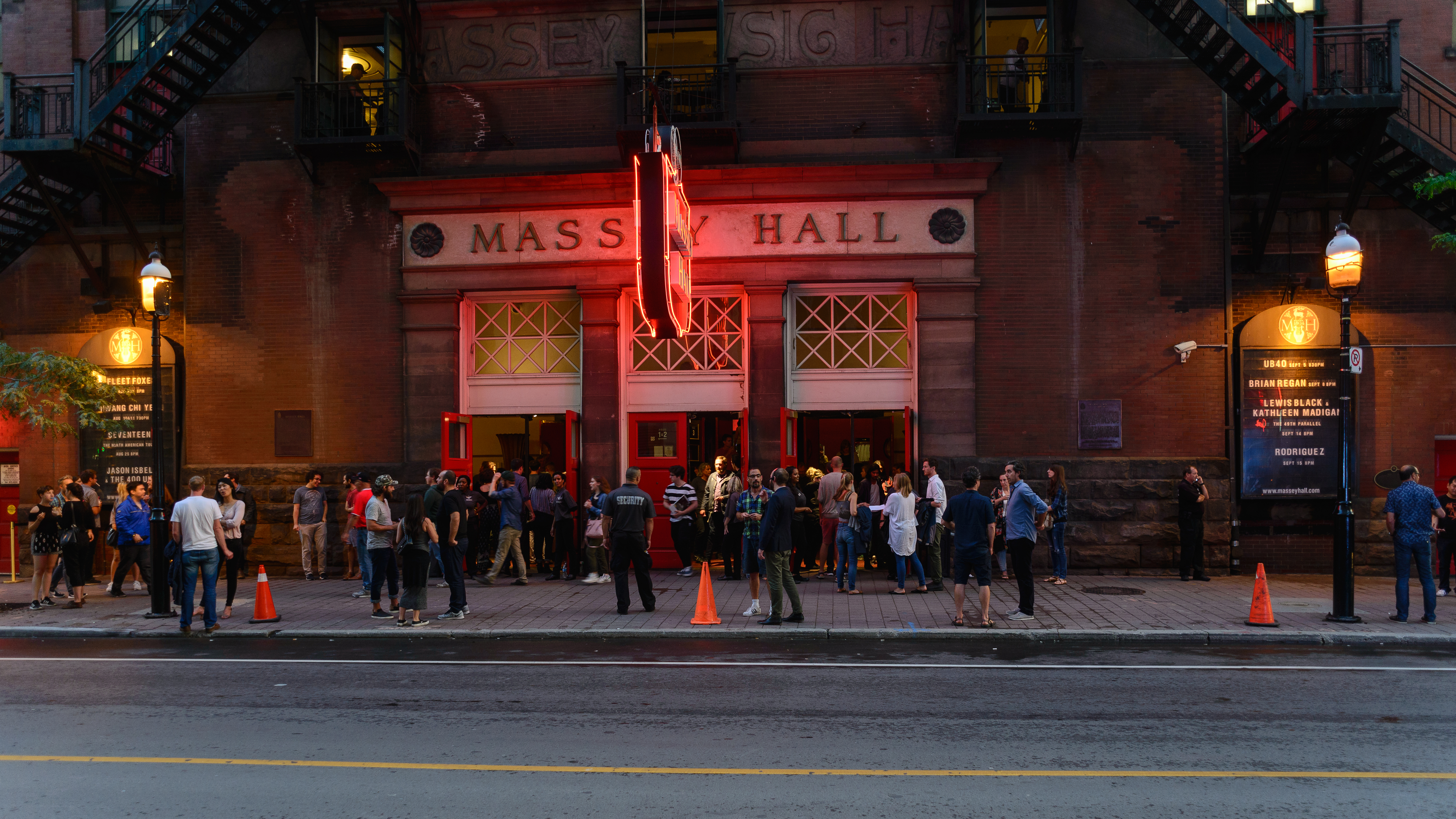
Entrance of Massey Hall in August 2017.

The Albert Building, at 15 Shuter Street, was added as a janitorial residence in 1917 and later converted as backstage space. It has since been demolished and replaced by a new addition during the 2010s renovations. It had a unique two-storey oriel window. In 1933, the Massey Foundation undertook further renovations to the hall. The venue simplified its name to Massey Hall at this time. Further renovations occurred in the 1940s.

Sister venue Roy Thomson Hall was known as New Massey Hall during the early planning stages. It was intended to replace Massey Hall as the primary venue for the Toronto Symphony Orchestra, although the intention was always for Massey Hall to remain open for other purposes following renovations. Its permanent name as Roy Thomson Hall was announced in January 1982, following a donation from media mogul and philanthropist Roy Thomson.

In 1994, to commemorate the hall's 100th anniversary, the basement was completely refurbished to include Centuries, a fully stocked bar. Prior to this addition, alcohol was not permitted in the hall. The decor of Centuries includes hundreds of photos of artists who have performed there over the years (largely collecting portraits of popular music stars since the 1980s), including many autographs. Centuries has a capacity of 220 people and often hosts CD releases and post-show parties for visiting artists. Roughly five years after Centuries was created, an additional bar in the balcony lounge was added.

In 2013, Massey Hall began a long-awaited major renovation, which included the demolition of the Albert Building and preparing the rear space for construction activities. In July 2018, Massey Hall announced phase two of the renovation, entitled "Massey Hall Forever," which included extensive exterior and interior renovations, expanded stage, a new seven-story addition, two new smaller concert rooms and a new retractable seating system. The new addition is called the Allied Music Centre, located on the site of the Albert Building. It incorporates an artists' lab, studio, lounge and theatre. It was completed in 2022.

=== Historic designations ===
In 1973, Toronto City Council designated Massey Hall a Heritage Property under the province's Ontario Heritage Act. Massey Hall was designated a National Historic Site of Canada on June 15, 1981.

== Notable performers and events ==
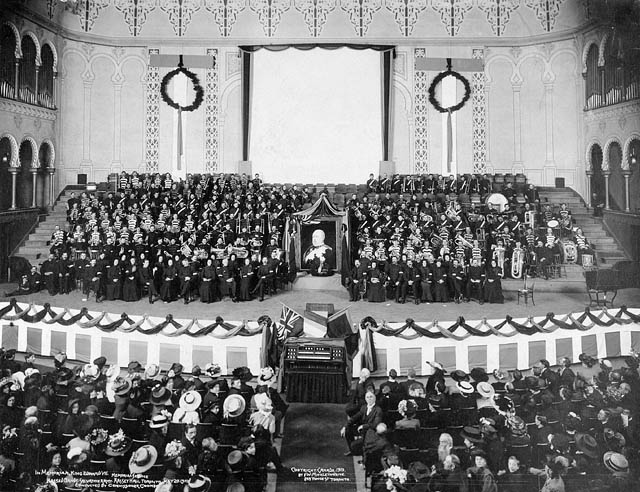
A memorial held for King Edward VII at Massey Hall in 1910.

The primary use of the hall has been for musical performances, but the hall has been used for many types of events, including public memorials, speaking tours, and boxing, among others. Many dignitaries have attended the hall since its inauguration. In 1901, the Duke and Duchess of Cornwall and York (the future King George V and his wife Queen Mary) visited with Canadian prime minister Wilfrid Laurier. Many prominent choirs, comedians, musicians, musical groups, singers and speakers have appeared on the stage of Massey Hall. The hall was also a prominent location for political speeches before the development of television.

Until 1984, the primary performer at the hall was the Toronto Symphony Orchestra, along with the Toronto Mendelssohn Choir. Operatic singers have included Montserrat Caballe, Maria Callas, Enrico Caruso, Luciano Pavarotti and Vladimir Rosing. Classical musicians have included George Gershwin, Glenn Gould, Vladimir Horowitz, and Arturo Toscanini, Jazz musicians and singers have included Oscar Peterson and Billie Holiday.

Popular musicians and singers have included Joni Mitchell, Tears for Fears, Justin Bieber, Cream, Bob Dylan, Billy Joel, the Kinks, Rush, Kraftwerk, Lenny Kravitz, Gordon Lightfoot, Yngwie Malmsteen, Golden Earring, Bob Marley and the Wailers, Nightwish, Joe Satriani, Seventeen, Ravi Shankar, Harry Styles, and Kiss.

Lightfoot played the hall over 170 times in his career, the most of any artist, including both the last show in 2018 before it was closed for renovations and the first show after it reopened in 2021.

Speakers at the hall have included William Booth, Winston Churchill, Helen Keller, Thomas Mann and the Dalai Lama. Comics have included Jerry Seinfeld and Russell Peters.

=== Notable appearances, concerts and related media ===
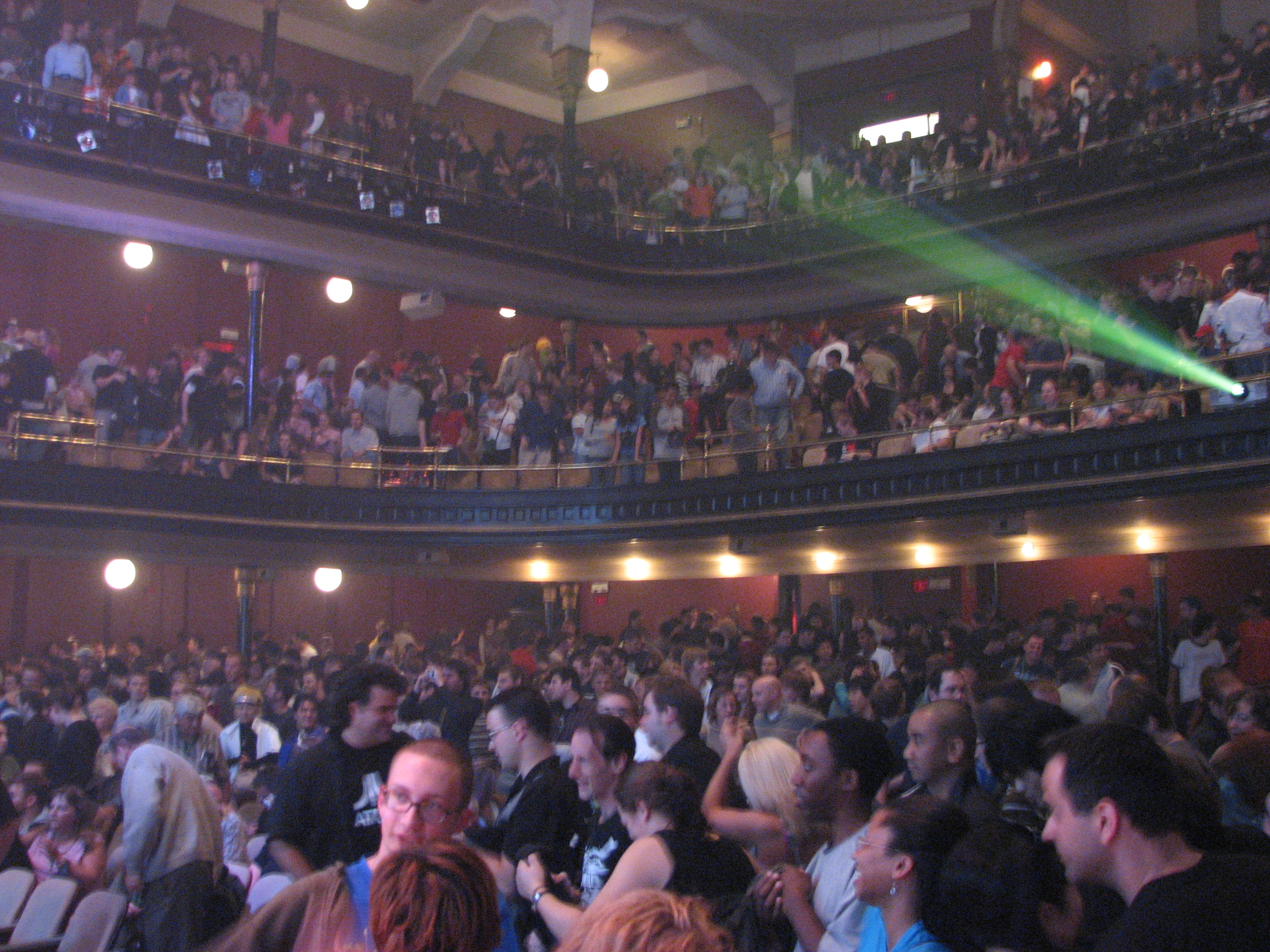
Interior of Massey Hall during Video Games Live concert series in 2006.

In May 1953, Massey Hall was the location of a notable jazz concert put on by five of the genre's most prominent artists of the era: Charlie Parker, Dizzy Gillespie, Bud Powell, Charles Mingus, and Max Roach. The performance was recorded and released as Jazz at Massey Hall.

Neil Young's performance on January 19, 1971, was recorded and later released as a live album, entitled Live at Massey Hall 1971. Young has since performed several times at Massey Hall.

In June 1976, Rush recorded the live album All the World's a Stage here. Max Webster, a Toronto band, opened for Rush and would later headline at the venue in 1977 and 1978, followed by a solo performance by Kim Mitchell, formerly of Max Webster, in 1984.

On January 8, 1995, Ronnie Hawkins celebrated his 60th birthday with a concert at Massey, which was documented on the album Let It Rock. The concert featured performances by Hawkins, Carl Perkins, Jerry Lee Lewis, the Band and Larry Gowan. Jeff Healey sat in on guitar for most, if not all, of the performances. Hawkins' band, The Hawks, or permutations of it, backed most, if not all, of the acts. All of the musicians performing that night were collectively dubbed "The Rock ‘N’ Roll Orchestra."

The May 2008 performance by Matthew Good at Massey was released as a live album, entitled Live at Massey Hall.

In 2013, folk-rock band Whitehorse made their first appearance at the venue. In conjunction with the concert, the band released the 2013 EP The Road to Massey Hall, comprising covers of songs by other musicians who had played the hall in the past.

In 2015, Canadian rock band Spirit of the West performed at Massey. The preparations for it are profiled in the 2016 documentary film Spirit Unforgettable.

Russell Peters's April 2016 appearances at Massey Hall were recorded for his Netflix stand-up special Almost Famous.

For the Juno Awards of 2021, which was performed from a variety of venues across Canada, the surviving members of the Tragically Hip performed their 2002 single "It's a Good Life If You Don't Weaken" with Feist on lead vocals, which marked the band's first televised performance since Gord Downie's death.

On February 29, 2024, singer-songwriter Ron Sexsmith staged a retrospective concert at the hall to mark his sixtieth birthday.

== Revitalization ==
In 2013, the Corporation of Roy Thomson and Massey Hall announced the closing of the performance space at Massey Hall for a revitalization project. The then 119-year-old building would proceed to undergo a two-phase renovation to restore some of the building's historic elements and the construction of new spaces to improve the community-driven centre.

=== Phase One ===
Phase one of the Massey Hall Restoration began in 2013 and was completed in 2017. This 16,000 ft^{2} (1,500 m^{2}) project consisted of the deconstruction of the adjacent Albert Building to prepare for the foundation of the new tower that was planned to be constructed in Phase Two.

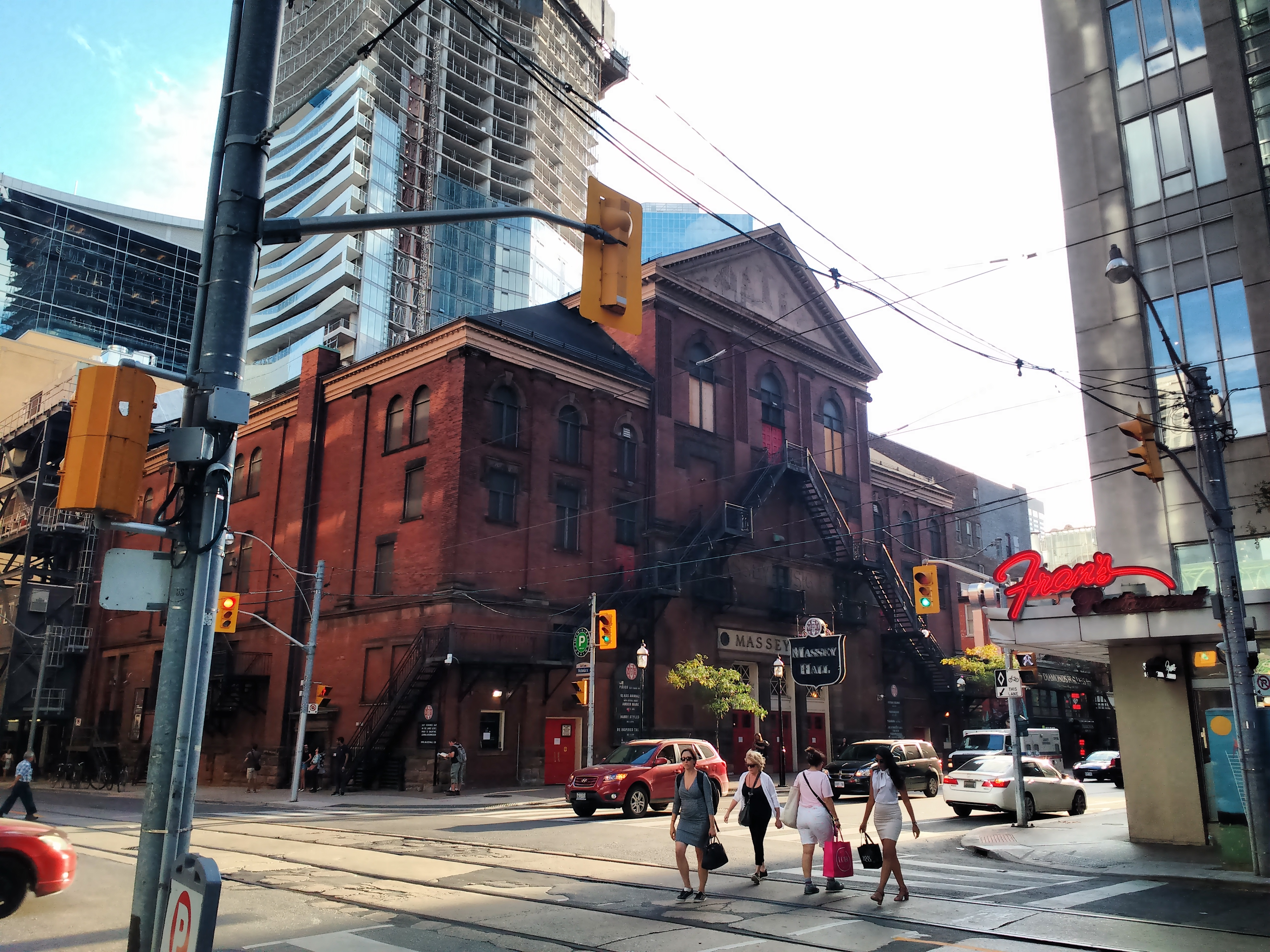
Massey Hall Exterior Pre renovation

=== Phase two ===
The second and primary phase of the renovation was a 124,000 ft^{2} (11,500 m^{2}) project with a budget of up to CA$113 million, including contributions of CA$30 million from the Ontario and Canadian governments. The main aspects of the second phase included a full restoration of the interior and exterior elements and the construction of the new addition. The phase was completed in 2022. However, Massey Hall reopened for performances in November 2021.

==== Phase Two Full restoration ====
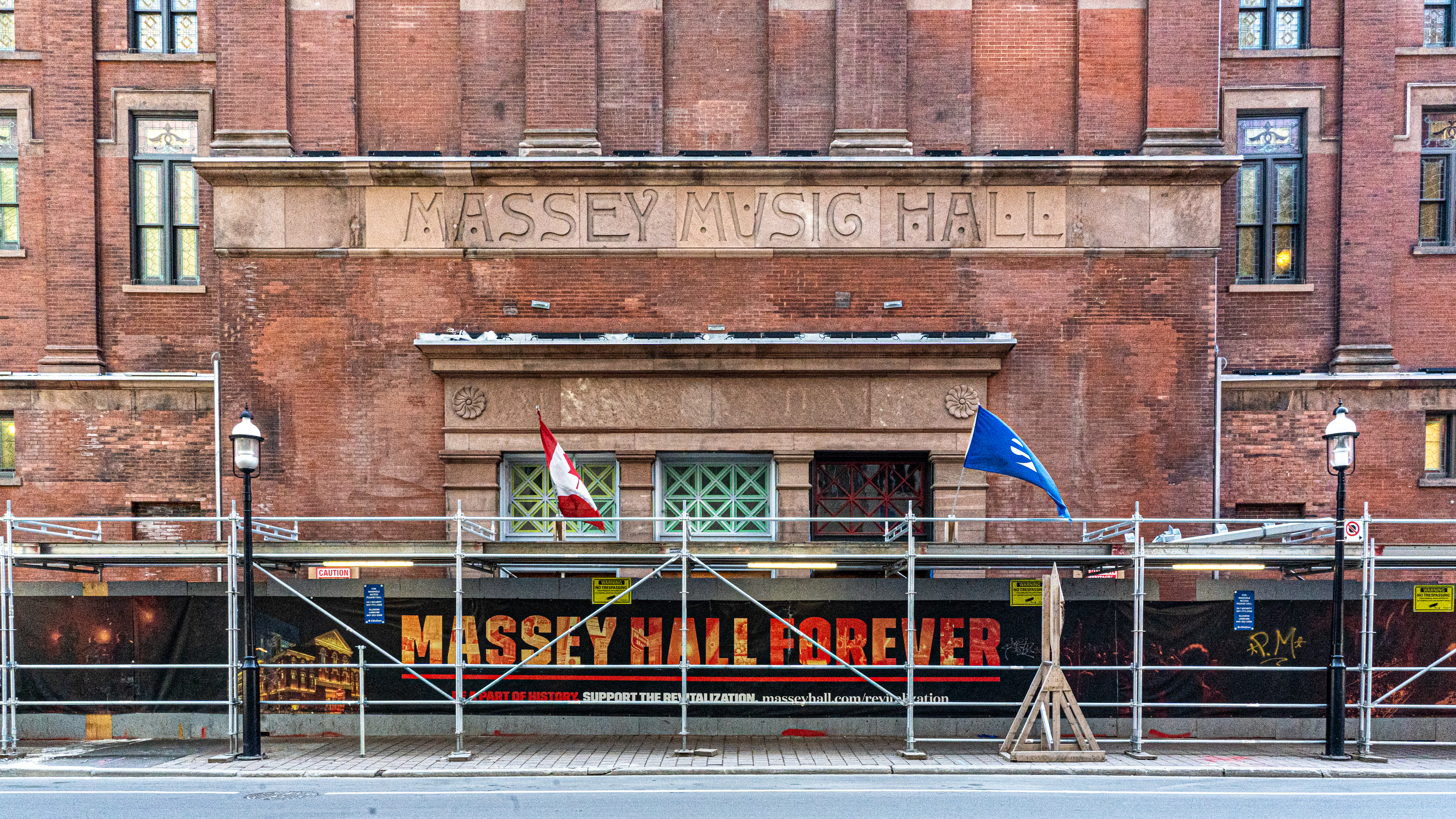
Massey Hall Construction 2021

The renovation of the interior of Massey Hall incorporated upgrading the technology by implementing mechanized removable seating to provide space for a standing general-admission area during performances and enhancing the audio and lighting systems. This refurbishment allowed for more flexibility for a variety of performances. The audio enhancements included diminishing the echo effect of sound that occurs during performances by introducing sound-absorbing plaster into the space.

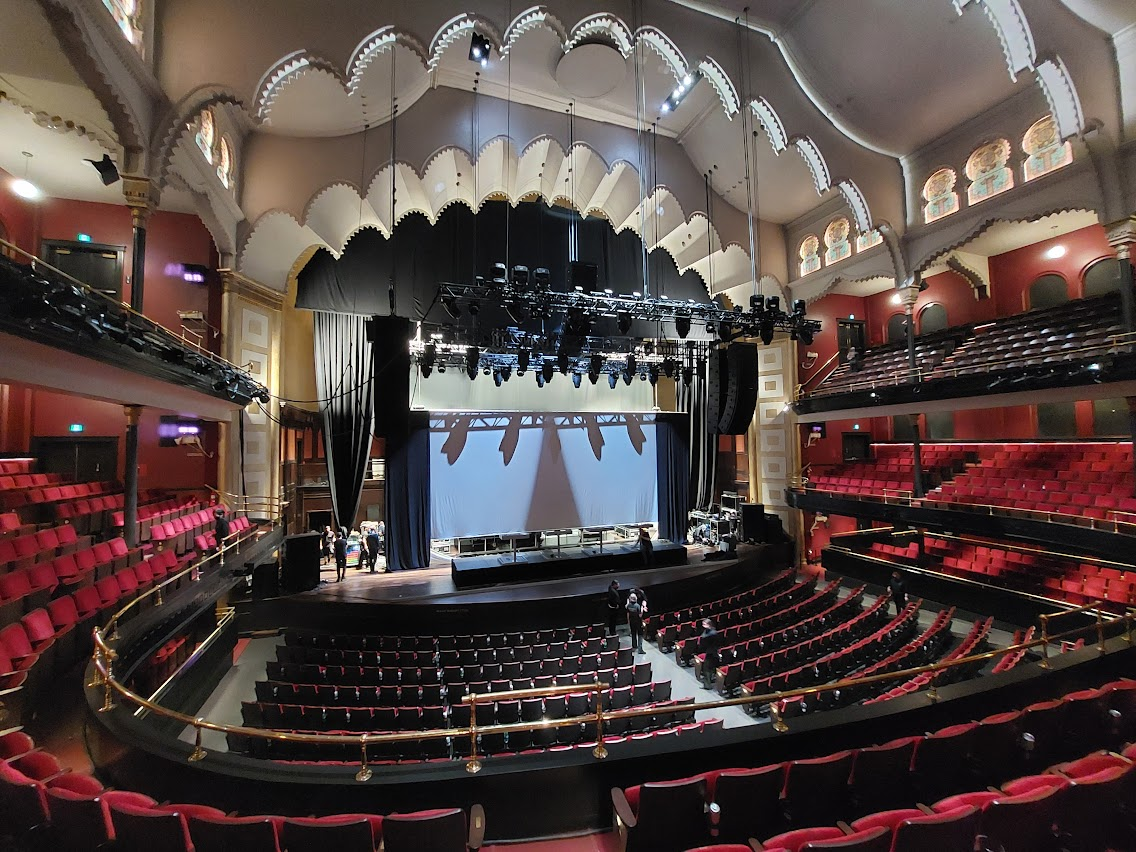
View of renovated Massey Hall interior

The refurbishment also restored the mixed architectural styles of Moorish revival, Palladian revival, and Art Deco found within the interior of the building while also ensuring the structural integrity of the building. The main idea was to make sure the Hall looked as if nothing had changed. This refurbishment procedure included the original wood, steel beams and restorers, repairing details, and making new plaster moulds of arch features if they were beyond repair. The ceiling had previously been covered in chicken wire to protect the audience below from debris. The renovation allowed audiences to see the repaired detailed ceiling. The interior renewal also consisted of keeping the Hall's original brass railings and new seats, which mimicked the originals.

The renovation moreover, focused on re-establishing the 100 original stained-glass windows that had been concealed with plywood since the 1950s due to sound disturbances. The refurbishment of the panes involved the fitting of noise defensive shades for the glass during concerts and performances. The renovation also facilitated the updating of Massey Hall to meet current Canadian accessibility standards. These updates included Passerelles on the second and third floors to connect the old Massey Hall to the addition and an elevator allowing individuals easy access to the upper levels. The grand stage was rebuilt and lifted to provide better visibility from the upper gallery seats. The restoration additionally re-established new backstage artist and performer accommodations.

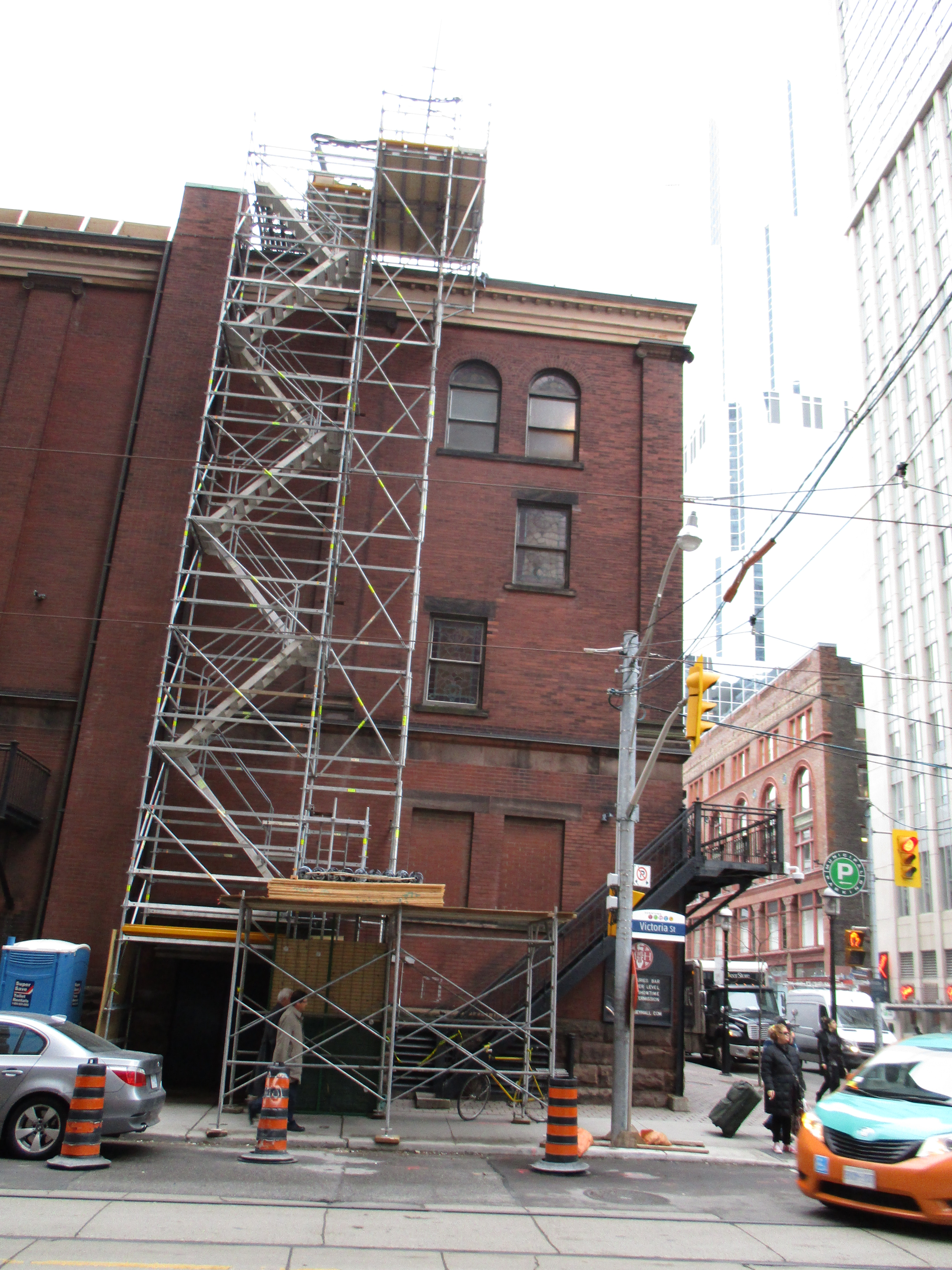
Massey Hall exterior under construction

==== Allied Music Centre ====
The construction of the new southern seven-story glass addition, named the Allied Music Centre, was designed to accommodate more support spaces for the hall. Accessible through the outdoor passerelles, the addition contains rehearsal spaces, a performance studio, a lounge, new washrooms, dressing rooms for performers, and a loading dock for equipment and deliveries. On the fourth floor, is the new 450-capacity TD Music Hall. The sixth floor contains the new Allied Music Centre Theatre, a smaller space with a capacity of 105 seated. It additionally contains the Deane Cameron Recording Studio on the seventh floor, which gets its name from the late Massey Hall CEO. Located in the basement of the main hall is the Muskoka Spirits Bar, which has another performance space as well, intended for smaller performances with a standing capacity of 450.The new modern glass passerelles leading to the tower hangs off the side of Massey Hall and contrasts with the original brick structure creating a connection between the new and the old. This state-of-the-art facility was designed and designated as a space for the community, artistic development and outreach initiatives.

=== Architects ===
The two-phase restoration process of Massey Hall was led by Marianne McKenna of KPMB Architects and Christopher Borgal of GBCA Architects. KPMB mainly focused on the architecture and interior design aspects, while GBCA focused on the heritage impact and restoration perspective. The total budget was CA$184 million.

== Public transportation ==
An entrance to Queen subway station on Line 1 Yonge–University is located nearby at the corner of Shuter Street and Yonge Street.

The 501 Queen streetcar line stops at the corner of Victoria Street and Queen Street.

== See also ==
- List of music venues in Toronto
