= Raymond Massey (cocktail) =

Bubbly cocktail

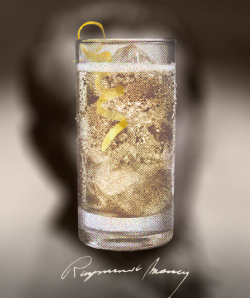
- A Raymond Massey served in a highball glass.
- Type: Highball
- Ingredients: 2 oz Canadian rye whisky; ½ oz Ginger syrup; 5 oz Champagne
- Base spirit: Whisky, Champagne
- Standard drinkware: Highball glass
- Standard garnish: Lemon peel
- Served: On the rocks: poured over ice
- Preparation: Shake whisky and syrup over ice. Strain into highball and top with champagne. Garnish with lemon peel.

The Raymond Massey is a cocktail made of rye, ginger syrup, and champagne. The drink's namesake is Canadian actor Raymond Massey (1896–1983), and the beverage is predominantly consumed in his hometown of Toronto, Ontario.

Ginger syrup can be prepared in advance much as simple syrup, but with the inclusion of 3/4 cup (~180 mL) of peeled and sliced ginger.

== Variations ==
When gin is substituted for the whisky and lemon juice for the ginger syrup, the drink is called a French 75.
