= Massey Foundation =

Canadian charitable foundation

The Massey Foundation was incorporated in 1918. It is responsible for the construction of many Toronto landmarks. It was the first trust of its kind in Canada.

== History ==
In 1896, Hart Massey, an industrialist who built the Massey-Harris farm equipment company, died. In his will he decreed that the majority of his estate be disposed of by 1916 for the benefit of various public institutions and causes. The trustees decided to establish the Massey Foundation. The trustees were family members, including Hart's son Chester and Chester's son, Vincent. In 1918, the foundation was incorporated.

The Massey Foundation was designed to create new projects. One of the first projects supported was the Massey Memorial Organ (completed in 1907 with Massey estate funds and named for Hart Massey) which is located in Chautauqua Institution and the completion of Hart House, which was started in 1911 with Massey estate funds and also named after Hart Massey. It also funded the construction of the Hart House Theatre. In 1933, the foundation undertook the renovation of Massey Hall. In 1962, it built and endowed Massey College at the University of Toronto.

In 1950, the Massey Foundation (in collaboration with the Royal Architectural Institute of Canada) began the Massey Medals for Architecture program which ran until 1970. In 1982, the Governor General's Medals in Architecture program began in order to continue the tradition of this awards program.

In 1959, the Massey Foundation also established the Massey Medal "to recognize outstanding personal achievement in the exploration, development or description of the geography of Canada." The Medal is awarded by the Royal Canadian Geographical Society.

== See also ==
- Massey Lectures
