= Massey Memorial Organ =

Pipe organ in Chautauqua, New York

The Massey Memorial Pipe Organ is located on the grounds of the famous Chautauqua Institution. This high-precision instrument is subject to harsh winter conditions from the snowbelt downwind of Lake Erie. It is generally considered to be an outdoor symphonic organ. The instrument was installed in 1907 and given to the Chautauqua Institution by Eliza A. Massey in memory of her husband, Hart Massey. During the Chautauqua summer season, which runs from late June to late August, there are recitals on the Massey Organ most Wednesdays by organist Joshua Stafford.

In 1914, 1928 and 1972, the Massey Organ received tonal changes and replacement or reconfiguring of some of the pipes. In 1992–1993, a complete reconstruction was completed by the Fischer Pipe Organ Company of Erie, Pennsylvania. All the existing pipes were restored to their original stop designations, some were replaced and new windchests added. As of 2016, the instrument has 5,640 pipes.

A video documentary showing the instrument's 1992–1993 reconstruction was made by Rochester Institute of Technology student Frederick Rueckert. This DVD is currently available for purchase at the Chautauqua Institution bookstore, under the title "Between the Motion and the Music, the Massey Organ Reconstruction". In 2003, a 32' Bombarde stop was added to the instrument by Fischer Pipe Organ Company. This unique stop, built by AR Shopp and Company, was donated by Rueckert in memory of his grandparents and his college documentary project.

In September 2016, the Chautauqua Amphitheater, which was listed on the national register of historic places, and housed the instrument was demolished to make way for a new and updated building. The new Amphitheater has integrated the existing Massey Memorial Organ and its brick organ vault, leaving the organ façade exposed as before and the vault now encased within the new Amphitheater back of house structure. During the winter months giant garage doors cover the instruments façade (front) pipes, protecting the instrument from the elements. This instrument is considered an outdoor instrument, where the air temperature of the outside is the same as inside the organ, this a challenge to keep the instrument in tune. Since 2021, the organ has been under the care of the Kegg Organ Company.
