= Raymond Massey =

Canadian-American actor (1896–1983)

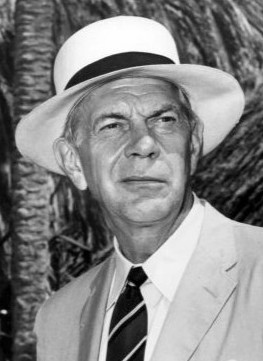
- Massey in a publicity photo for Adventures in Paradise, May 1961
- Born: Raymond Hart Massey; August 30, 1896; Toronto, Ontario, Canada
- Died: July 29, 1983 (aged 86); Los Angeles, California, U.S.
- Resting place: Beaverdale Memorial Park in New Haven, Connecticut
- Citizenship: British subject (until 1947); United States (after 1944); Canada (after 1947)
- Education: University of Toronto; Balliol College, Oxford
- Occupation: Actor
- Years active: 1918–1973
- Spouses: Margery Fremantle (m. 1921; div. 1929) Adrianne Allen (m. 1929; div. 1939) Dorothy Whitney (m. 1939; died 1982)
- Children: 3, including Anna Massey and Daniel Massey
- Relatives: Vincent Massey (brother); Lionel Massey (nephew)
- Family: Massey
- Military career
- Allegiance: Canada
- Branch: Canadian Army
- Service years: 1914–1919; 1942–1943
- Rank: Major
- Units: Royal Regiment of Canadian Artillery; Canadian Siberian Expeditionary Force
- Conflicts: World War I; Battle of Mont Sorrel; Allied intervention in the Russian Civil War; World War II

Raymond Hart Massey (August 30, 1896 – July 29, 1983) was a Canadian and American actor. Known for his commanding stage-trained voice, he was nominated for an Academy Award for Best Actor for his portrayal of the title role in Abe Lincoln in Illinois (1940), a role he later reprised on television and in the film How the West Was Won (1962). Among his other well-known roles were Dr. Gillespie on the NBC television series Dr. Kildare (1961–66), John Brown in Santa Fe Trail (1940) and Seven Angry Men (1955), Abraham Farlan in A Matter of Life and Death (1946), and Jonathan Brewster in Arsenic and Old Lace (1944).

== Early life and education ==
Massey was born in Toronto, Ontario, the son of Chester Daniel Massey and his American wife Anna Vincent. His father was the wealthy co-owner of the Massey-Harris tractor company. Raymond was the grandson of businessman Hart Massey and great-grandson of company founder Daniel Massey. His branch of the Massey family immigrated to Canada from New England a few years before the War of 1812, their ancestors having migrated from England to the Massachusetts colony in the 1630s.

Massey attended secondary school at Upper Canada College in Toronto for two years before transferring to Appleby College in Oakville, Ontario. He also took several courses at the University of Toronto, where he was an active member of the Kappa Alpha Society.

== Military service ==
=== First World War ===
Massey joined the Canadian Army at the outbreak of World War I, and served on the Western Front in the Royal Regiment of Canadian Artillery. Lieutenant Massey returned to Canada after being wounded at Zillebeke in Belgium during the Battle of Mont Sorrel in 1916 and was engaged as an army instructor for American officers at Yale University. In 1918, he was recalled to active service and joined the Canadian Siberian Expeditionary Force that went to Siberia during the Allied intervention in the Russian Civil War. On the orders of his commanding general, he organized a minstrel show troupe with himself as end man in blackface to bolster morale of allied troops on occupation duty in Vladivostok.

After returning home in 1919, he attended Balliol College, Oxford. He later went to work in the family business, selling farm implements, but he was drawn to the theater. He persuaded his reluctant family to allow him to pursue this career.

=== Second World War ===
In 1942, during World War II, Massey rejoined the Canadian Army and served as a major in the adjutant general's branch. After being wounded, he was invalided from the Canadian Army in 1943. He became an American citizen in 1944.

== Acting career ==
He first appeared on the London stage in 1922 in Eugene O'Neill's In the Zone. According to his obituary in The New York Times, he appeared in "several dozen plays and directed numerous others" in England over the next decade. The Washington Post credited him with performances in over 80 plays, including Pygmalion with Gertrude Lawrence; Ethan Frome with Ruth Gordon; and the George Bernard Shaw works The Doctor's Dilemma and Candida with Katharine Cornell. In 1929, he directed the London premiere of The Silver Tassie. He received poor reviews in his debut on Broadway in an unorthodox 1931 production of Hamlet.

The first movie he was in was High Treason (1928). In 1931, he played Sherlock Holmes in The Speckled Band, the first sound film version of the story. In 1934, he played the villain in The Scarlet Pimpernel, and in 1936, he starred in Things to Come, a film adaptation by H.G. Wells of his own speculative novel The Shape of Things to Come (1933). In 1944, Massey played the district attorney in Fritz Lang's classic film noir The Woman in the Window, which starred Edward G. Robinson and Joan Bennett. He portrayed the American Revolutionary War character Abraham Farlan, who hated the British for making him a casualty of that war, in the 1946 film A Matter of Life and Death (titled Stairway to Heaven in the U.S.).

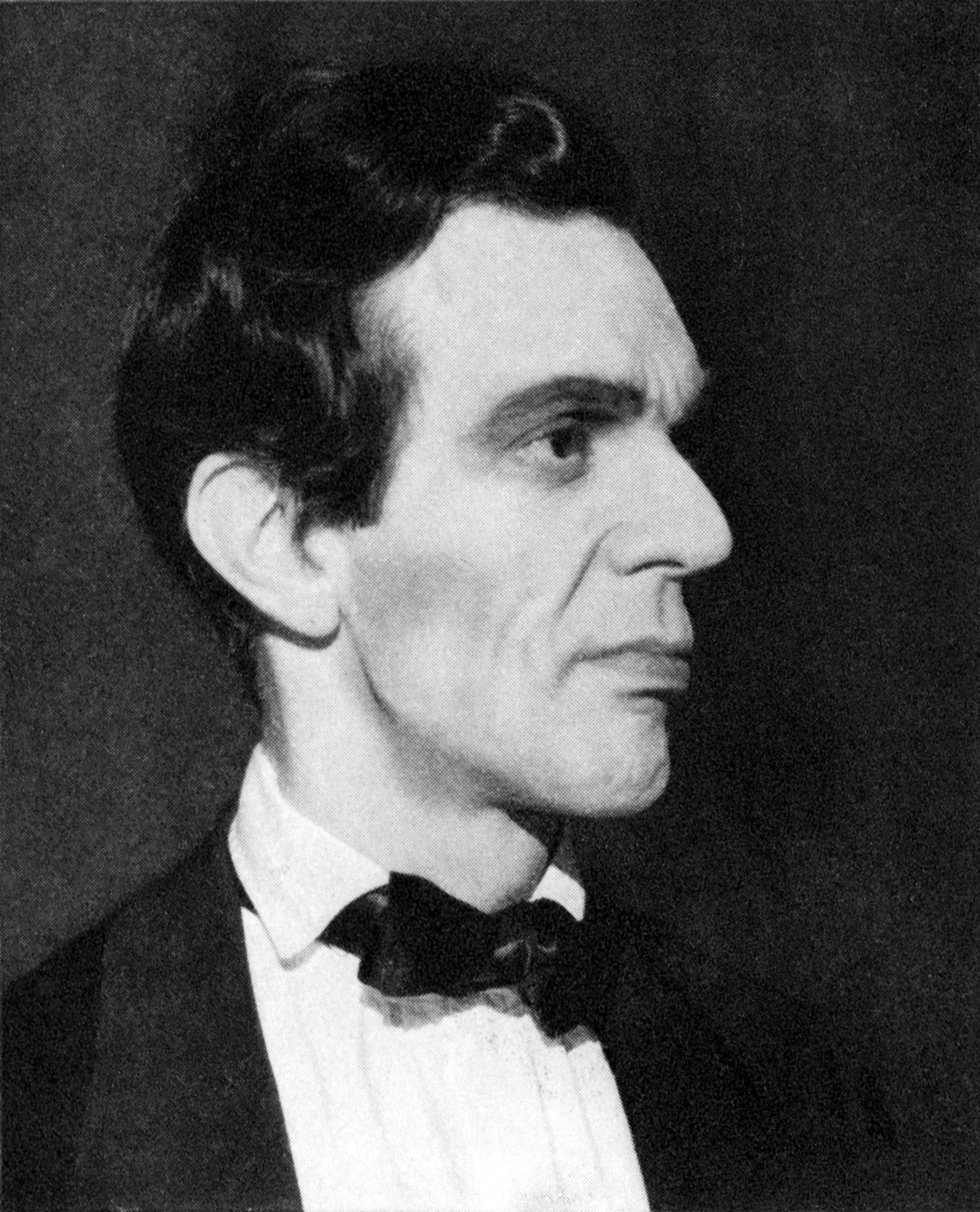
Raymond Massey in the Broadway production of Abe Lincoln in Illinois (1938)

Despite being Canadian, Massey became famous for playing archetypal American historical figures. He played abolitionist/insurrectionist John Brown in two films: Santa Fe Trail (1940) and again in the low-budget Seven Angry Men (1955). The character of Brown is a wild-eyed lunatic in Santa Fe Trail, whereas he is a well-intentioned but misguided character in the more sympathetic Seven Angry Men. Massey scored a great triumph on Broadway in Robert E. Sherwood's Pulitzer Prize-winning play Abe Lincoln in Illinois despite reservations about Lincoln's being portrayed by a Canadian. He repeated his role in the 1940 film version, for which he was nominated for the Academy Award for Best Actor. Massey again portrayed Lincoln in The Day Lincoln Was Shot on Ford Star Jubilee (1956), a silent appearance in How the West Was Won (1962), and two TV adaptations of Abe Lincoln in Illinois broadcast in 1950 and 1951. He once complained jokingly that he was "the only actor ever typecast as a president." His preparation for the role was so detailed and obsessive that one person commented that Massey would not be satisfied with his Lincoln impersonation until someone assassinated him. On stage in a dramatic reading of Stephen Vincent Benét's John Brown's Body (1953), Massey, in addition to narrating along with Tyrone Power and Judith Anderson, took on the roles of both John Brown and Lincoln.

Massey played a Canadian on-screen only once, in 49th Parallel (1941).

During World War II, he teamed up with Katharine Cornell and other leading actors in a revival of Shaw's Candida to benefit the Army Emergency Fund and the Navy Relief Society.

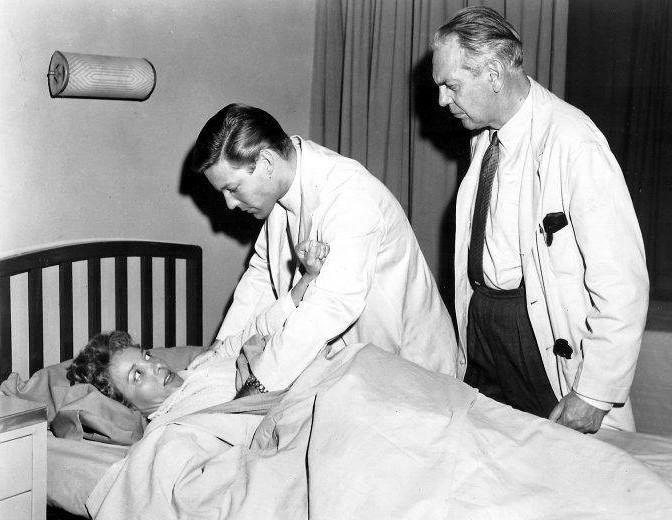
Beverly Garland, Richard Chamberlain and Raymond Massey in the first episode of Dr. Kildare (1961)

Massey portrayed Jonathan Brewster in the film version of Arsenic and Old Lace. The character had been created by Boris Karloff for the stage version, and a running gag in the play and the film was the character's resemblance to Karloff. Even though the film was released in 1944, it was shot in 1941, at which time Karloff still was contracted to the Broadway play and could not be released for the filming (unlike his costars Josephine Hull, Jean Adair and John Alexander). Massey and Karloff had appeared together earlier in James Whale's suspense film The Old Dark House (1932).

After Massey became an American citizen, he continued to work in Hollywood. Memorable film roles included the husband of Joan Crawford during her Oscar-nominated role in Possessed (1947) and the doomed publishing tycoon Gail Wynand in The Fountainhead (1949) with Patricia Neal and Gary Cooper. In 1952 his stage play Hanging Judge appeared in the West End, directed by Michael Powell. In 1955 he starred in East of Eden as Adam Trask, father of Cal, played by James Dean, and Aron, played by Richard Davalos.

Massey became well known on television in the 1950s and 1960s. He was cast in 1960 as Sir Oliver Garnett in the episode "Trunk Full of Dreams" of the NBC series Riverboat.

Massey is remembered as Dr. Gillespie in the popular 1961–1966 NBC series Dr. Kildare, with Richard Chamberlain in the title role. Massey and his son Daniel were cast as father and son in The Queen's Guards (1961).

== Personal life ==
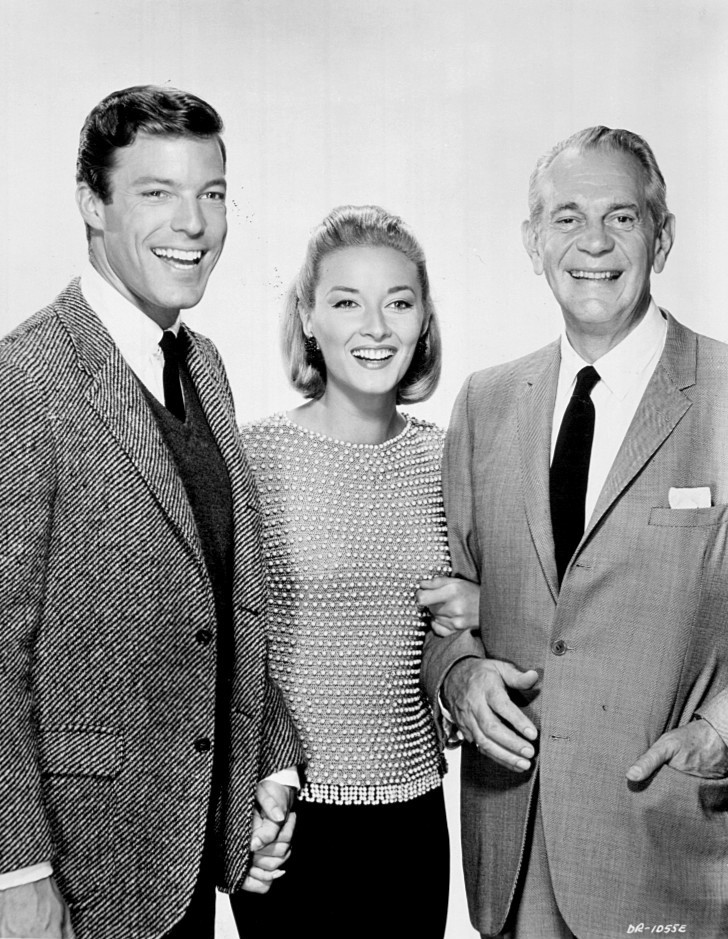
Richard Chamberlain, Daniela Bianchi and Massey in Dr. Kildare (1964)

Massey was married three times.

- Margery Fremantle from 1921 to 1929 (divorce); they had one child, architect Geoffrey Massey.
- Adrianne Allen from 1929 to 1939 (divorce); Allen was a stage actress in London and on Broadway. They had two children who followed them into acting: Anna Massey and Daniel Massey.
- Dorothy Whitney from 1939 until her death in 1982.

His high-profile estrangement and divorce from Adrianne Allen was the inspiration for Ruth Gordon and Garson Kanin's script for the film Adam's Rib (1949), starring Katharine Hepburn and Spencer Tracy, and indeed Massey married the lawyer who represented him in court, Dorothy Whitney, while his then former wife, Allen, married the opposing lawyer, William Dwight Whitney.

Massey's older brother, Vincent Massey, was the first Canadian-born governor general of Canada. Massey also dabbled in politics, appearing in a 1964 television advertisement in support of the conservative Republican presidential nominee Barry Goldwater. Massey denounced U.S. President Lyndon B. Johnson for a "no-win" strategy in the Vietnam War, suggesting that Goldwater would pursue an aggressive strategy and win the war quickly.

=== Death ===
Massey died of pneumonia in Los Angeles, California on July 29, 1983, a month before he would have turned 87. His death came on the same day as that of David Niven, with whom he had co-starred in The Prisoner of Zenda and A Matter of Life and Death. Massey is buried in New Haven, Connecticut's Beaverdale Memorial Park.

== Honors ==
Massey has two stars on the Hollywood Walk of Fame, one for films at 1719 Vine Street and one for television at 6708 Hollywood Boulevard. His achievements have also been recognized in a signature cocktail, the Raymond Massey.

== Filmography ==
| Year | Title | Role | Notes |
|---|---|---|---|
| 1928 | High Treason | Member of Federated States Council | Uncredited |
| 1929 | The Crooked Billet | Undetermined role | Uncredited; 'lost' film; one copy known to exist in a private collection |
| 1931 | The Speckled Band | Sherlock Holmes | |
| 1932 | The Face at the Window | Paul le Gros | |
| 1932 | The Old Dark House | Philip Waverton | |
| 1934 | The Scarlet Pimpernel | Citizen Chauvelin | |
| 1936 | Things to Come | John Cabal / Oswald Cabal | |
| 1937 | Fire Over England | Philip II of Spain | |
| 1937 | Dreaming Lips | Miguel del Vayo | |
| 1937 | Under the Red Robe | Cardinal Richelieu | |
| 1937 | The Prisoner of Zenda | Black Michael | |
| 1937 | The Hurricane | Governor Eugene De Laage | |
| 1938 | The Drum | Prince Ghul | |
| 1938 | Black Limelight | Peter Charrington | |
| 1940 | Abe Lincoln in Illinois | Abraham Lincoln | Nominated — Academy Award for Best Actor |
| 1940 | Santa Fe Trail | John Brown | |
| 1941 | 49th Parallel | Andy Brock | |
| 1941 | Dangerously They Live | Dr. Ingersoll | |
| 1942 | Reap the Wild Wind | King Cutler | |
| 1942 | Desperate Journey | Major Otto Baumeister | |
| 1943 | Action in the North Atlantic | Captain Steve Jarvis | |
| 1944 | Arsenic and Old Lace | Jonathan Brewster | |
| 1944 | The Woman in the Window | District Attorney Frank Lalor | |
| 1945 | Hotel Berlin | Arnim von Dahnwitz | |
| 1945 | God Is My Co-Pilot | Major General Claire L. Chennault | |
| 1946 | A Matter of Life and Death | Abraham Farlan | |
| 1947 | Possessed | Dean Graham | |
| 1947 | Mourning Becomes Electra | Brigadier General Ezra Mannon | |
| 1949 | The Fountainhead | Gail Wynand | |
| 1949 | Roseanna McCoy | Old Randall McCoy | |
| 1950 | Chain Lightning | Leland Willis | |
| 1950 | Barricade | Boss Kruger | |
| 1950 | Dallas | Will Marlow | |
| 1951 | Sugarfoot | Jacob Stint | |
| 1951 | David and Bathsheba | Nathan | |
| 1951 | Come Fill the Cup | John Ives | |
| 1952 | Carson City | A. J. "Big" Jack Davis | |
| 1953 | The Desert Song | Sheik Yousseff | |
| 1955 | Prince of Players | Junius Brutus Booth | |
| 1955 | Battle Cry | Major General Snipes | |
| 1955 | East of Eden | Adam Trask | |
| 1955 | Seven Angry Men | John Brown | |
| 1957 | Omar Khayyam | The Shah | |
| 1958 | The Naked and the Dead | General Cummings | |
| 1959 | Alfred Hitchcock Presents | Sam Pine | Season 5 Episode 11: "Road Hog" |
| 1960 | Wagon Train | Montezuma IX | Season 4, episode 6, "Princess of a Lost Tribe" |
| 1961 | The Great Impostor | Abbott Donner | |
| 1961 | The Fiercest Heart | Willem Prinsloo | |
| 1961 | The Queen's Guards | Captain Fellowes | |
| 1961–1966 | Dr. Kildare | Dr. Leonard Gillespie | |
| 1962 | How the West Was Won | Abraham Lincoln | |
| 1969 | Mackenna's Gold | The Preacher | |
| 1971–1972 | Night Gallery | Colonel Archie Dittman; Doctor Glendon | Season 1, episode 4, second segment: "Clean Kills and Other Trophies"; Season 3, episode 4: "Rare Objects" |
| 1972 | All My Darling Daughters | Matthew Cunningham | TV movie |
| 1973 | The President's Plane Is Missing | Secretary of State Freeman Sharkey | TV movie |
| 1973 | My Darling Daughters' Anniversary | Matthew Cunningham | TV movie |

== Radio appearances ==
| Year | Program | Episode/source |
|---|---|---|
| 1941 | Philip Morris Playhouse | Wuthering Heights |
| 1942 | Philip Morris Playhouse | The Man Who Played God |
| 1944 | The Doctor Fights | Narrator |
| 1945 | Inner Sanctum Mystery | Death Across the Board |
| 1952 | Cavalcade of America | With Malice Towards None |
| 1952 | The Endless Frontier | Only One to a Customer |

== See also ==
- Canadian pioneers in early Hollywood
- Massey family
