= Hart Massey =

Canadian businessman, philanthropist

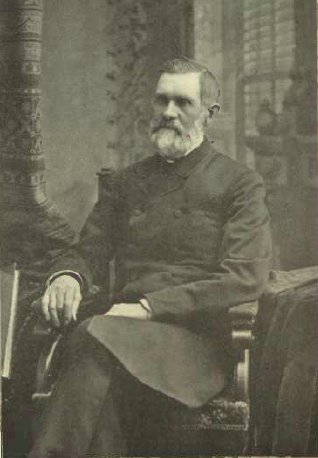
- Born: Hart Almerrin Massey; April 29, 1823; Haldimand Township, Upper Canada
- Died: February 20, 1896 (aged 72); Toronto, Ontario, Canada
- Resting place: Mount Pleasant Cemetery, Toronto, Ontario
- Occupation: Businessman
- Spouse: Eliza Ann Phelps
- Children: Lillian Frances Treble, four sons

Hart Almerrin Massey (April 29, 1823 – February 20, 1896) was a Canadian businessman and philanthropist who was a member of the prominent Massey family. He was an industrialist who built the agricultural equipment firm that became Massey Ferguson, now part of AGCO.

== Life and career ==
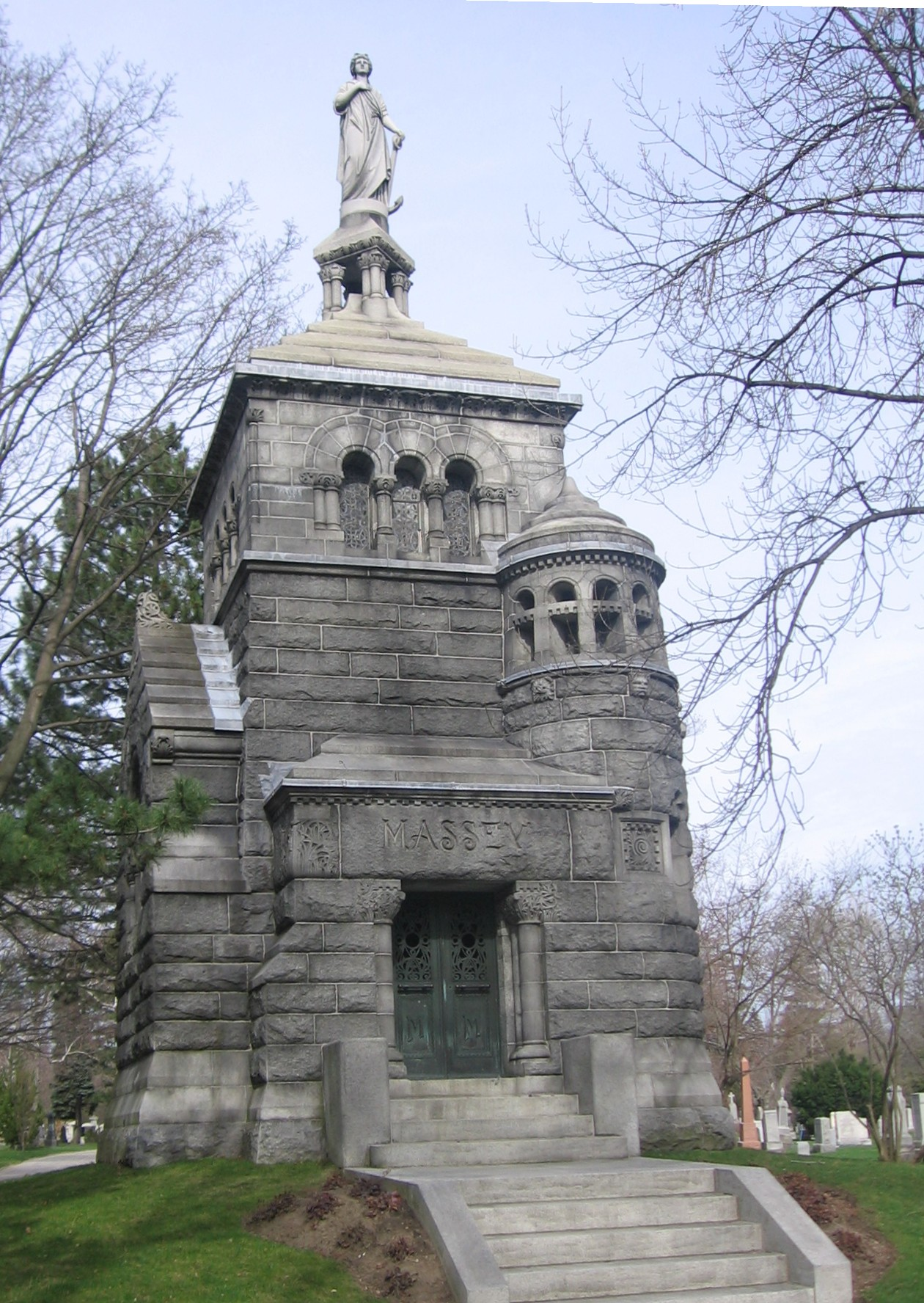
Massey's mausoleum in Mount Pleasant Cemetery, designed by E.J. Lennox in Romanesque revival style

Massey was born in Haldimand Township (now Alnwick/Haldimand, Ontario) in what was then known as Upper Canada. His parents were both American, Daniel Massey and Lucina Bradley. Hart held dual Canadian and United States citizenship. The doorstep of the original Massey homestead can still be found behind the current farmhouse on the farm, which remains in the Massey family.

Newcastle Foundry and Machine Manufactory had been founded by his father, Daniel Massey. In 1851, Hart joined the company and became the sole owner in 1856 upon his father's death. He moved it from rural Newcastle to the city of Toronto in the 1870s. He expanded the company's market to Bologna, Australia, and Europe in the 1880s. Hart had planned to retire and pass the company to his son, Charles; however, Charles died of typhoid in 1884 forcing Hart to return to managing the company. During this period, he oversaw Massey Manufacturing merging with the Harris firm. Another merger was made with Patterson-Wisner Company leaving Massey-Harris with 4% of the Canadian agricultural equipment market.

== Marriage and children ==
Massey's daughter, Alice Davidson (1854–1915), was a philanthropist and educator. Members of the next generation included his grandsons Vincent Massey, who became Governor General of Canada, and actor Raymond Massey.

== Death and legacy ==
He died in Toronto in 1896 and was buried in Mount Pleasant Cemetery. Charitable gifts in his will led to the creation of the Massey Foundation, whose first major project was the completion of a student centre for the University of Toronto, which was given the name of Hart House. His estate funded the Burwash Hall men's residence at Victoria University.

The foundation also contributed to Massey Hall, a cultural landmark in Toronto, and more recently endowed Massey College at the University of Toronto. Massey was also a member of the Freemasons.
