= Lillian Massey Treble =

Canadian philanthropist

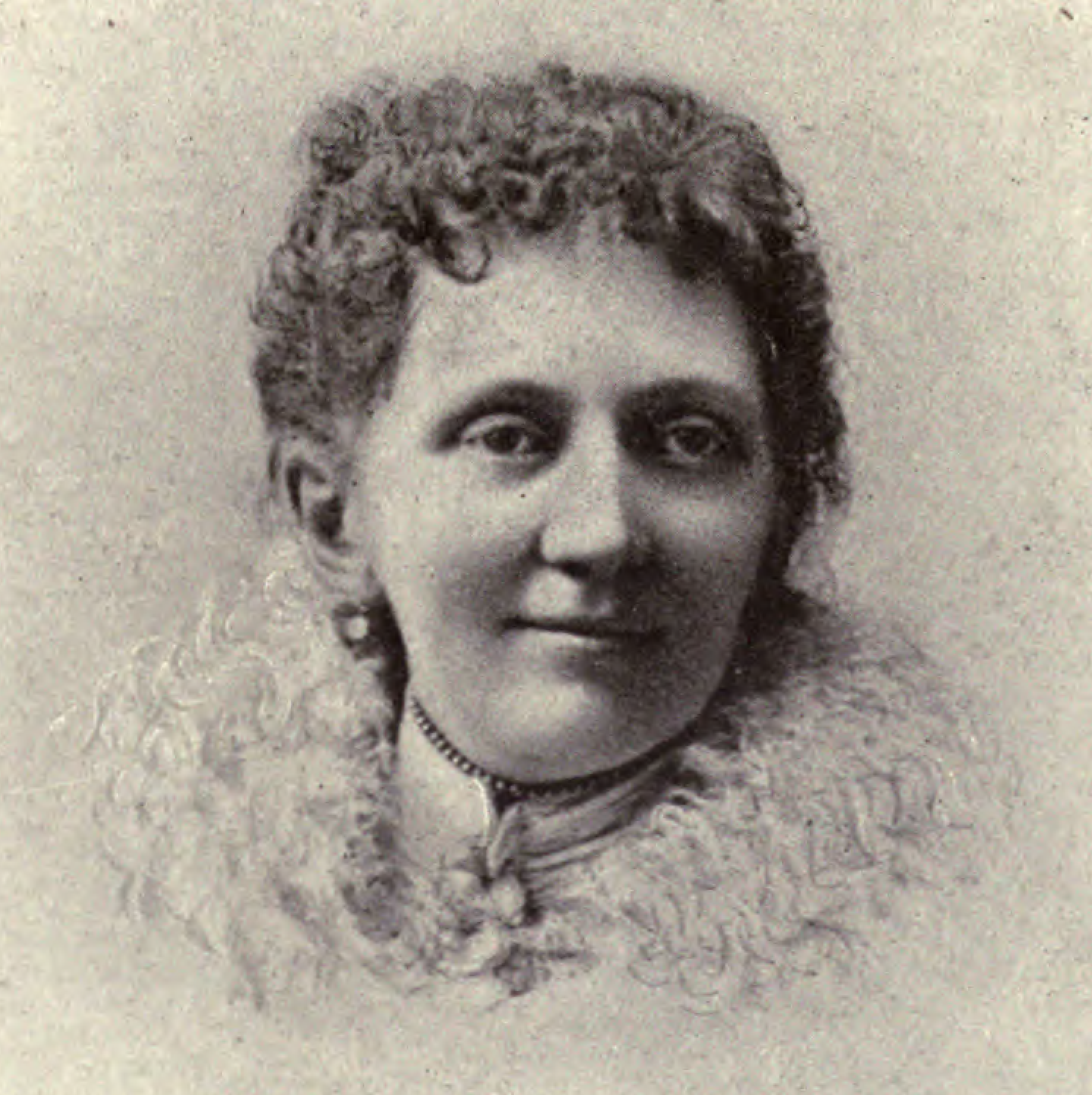
- Born: Lillian Frances Massey; March 2, 1854; Newcastle, Canada West
- Died: November 3, 1915 (aged 61); Santa Barbara, California, U.S.
- Spouse: John Mill Treble (m. 1897–1909; his death)
- Parents: Hart Massey (father); Eliza Ann Phelps (mother)

Lillian Massey Treble (born Lillian Frances Massey; March 2, 1854 – November 3, 1915) was a Canadian philanthropist and educator who was a member of the prominent Massey family.

== Biography ==
Her parents were Hart Massey, an industrialist who founded the Massey Manufacturing agricultural implements company, and Eliza Ann Phelps. She became interested in mission work and organized classes in domestic science, which led to her founding the Lillian Massey School of Household Science and Art.

Similar results were secured at the University of Toronto and other universities. She gave the University of Toronto the Lillian Massey Building, which was opened in 1913.

She married John Mill Treble on January 26, 1897, at the age of 42. He was the proprietor of the Great Shirt House, located at King and Bay streets in Toronto. He had been a long-time suitor.

After their marriage, Treble gave up his business to attend to the finances of the Fred Victor Mission and the Deaconess House, charities supported by Lillian. Treble died on May 17, 1909, during a meeting of the Massey-Harris board of directors. Lillian subsequently moved to a health resort in Santa Barbara, California. She died in 1915, leaving behind an estate of CA$2 million, including an island on Lake Rosseau in Ontario.
