= Massey College, Toronto =

Graduate residential college in Toronto, Canada

Massey College
- Affiliated residential college
- University of Toronto
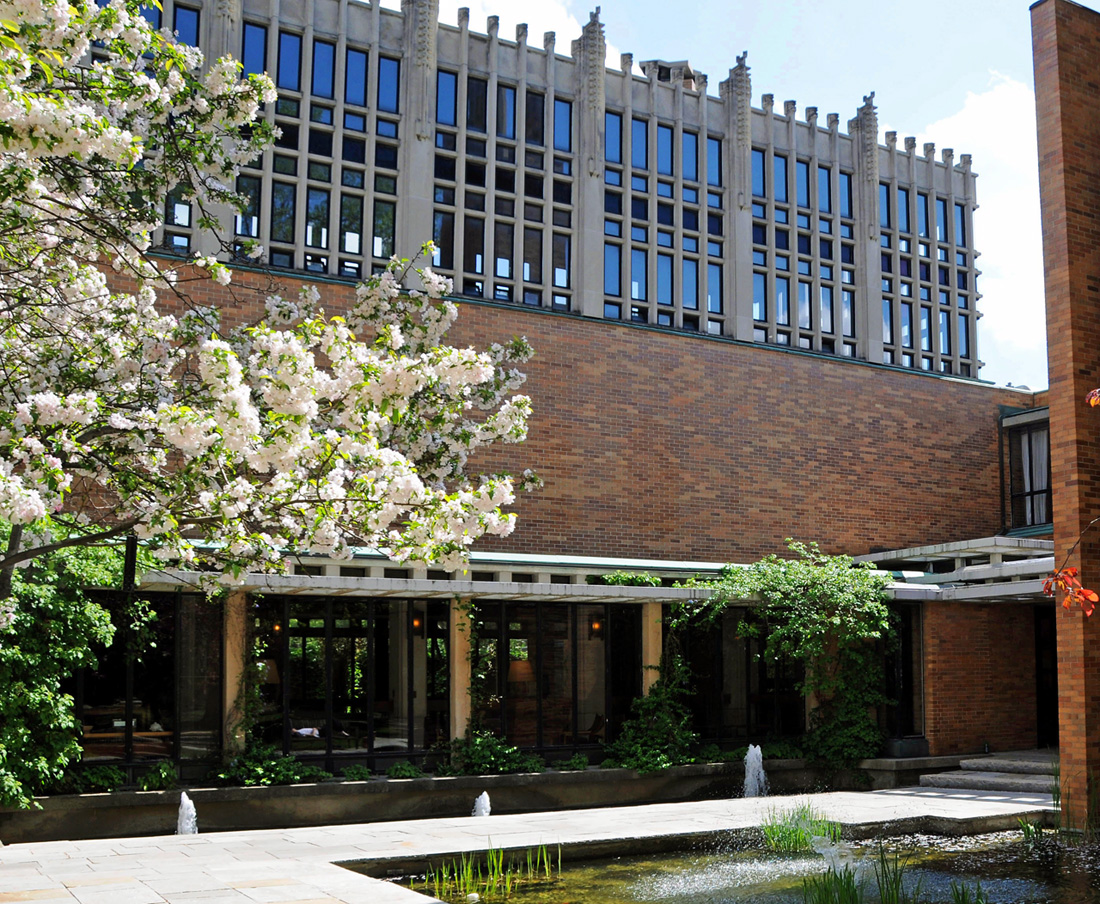
- View from the college's quadrangle

- Arms: Arms of the Chapel Royal at Massey College
- Location: 4 Devonshire Place, Toronto, Ontario, Canada
- Coordinates: 43°39′52″N 79°23′51″W
- Full name: The Principal and Fellows of Massey College
- Motto: Sapere aude (Latin)
- Motto in English: "Have the courage to be wise"
- Established: 1963; 63 years ago
- Named for: Vincent Massey
- Principal: James Orbinski
- Benefactor: Massey Foundation
- Postgraduates: 130
- Chapel: St. Catherine's Chapel
- Visitor: Robert Rae
- Website: masseycollege.ca

Ontario Heritage Act
- Criteria: Designated Part IV
- Designated: Feb 20, 1990

Massey College (officially The Principal and Fellows of Massey College) is an independent postgraduate residential college formally affiliated with the University of Toronto. Located on the St. George campus in Toronto, Ontario, Canada, Massey was established, built and partially endowed in 1962 by the Massey Foundation and officially opened in 1963, though women were not admitted until 1974. It was modelled around the traditional Cambridge and Oxford collegiate system and features a central court and porters lodge.

Similar to St. John's College, Cambridge, and All Souls College, Oxford, senior and junior fellows of Massey College are nominated from the university community and occasionally the wider community, and are elected by the governing board of the college. The president of the University of Toronto, the dean of Graduate Studies and three members of the Massey Foundation are ex officio members of the governing board, chaired by the elected member of the governing board. Members of the governing board are elected for five years; the principal of the college is elected for seven years.

The college is well-connected with prominent figures of the national establishment, and is the sponsor and host of the annual Massey Lectures. It hosted the Man Booker International Prize of 2007.

== History ==
Massey College was conceived by Vincent Massey, the 18th Governor General of Canada, who attended University College, Toronto, as an undergraduate. Of the establishment of a new graduate college, Massey wrote, "It is of great importance that it should, in its form, reflect the life which will go on inside it and should possess certain qualities—dignity, grace, beauty, and warmth." The Massey Foundation, for which Vincent Massey served as a trustee, provided the financial endowment.

Opened officially in 1963, the college was designed by Canadian architect Ron Thom, who subsequently designed the master plan for Trent University. Alan Beddoe designed the Massey College coat of arms, which derives from the arms of Vincent Massey.

The founding head of Massey College (1963–81) was the celebrated Canadian journalist and author Robertson Davies. Professor Patterson Hume was the second head (1981–88), and Professor Ann Saddlemyer was the third one (1988–95). The fourth head of the college (1995–2014) was journalist John Fraser. On July 1, 2014, Hugh Segal, formerly a member of the Senate of Canada, became the fifth head of the college for a seven-year term, but he resigned in 2019. The sixth principal was Justice Nathalie Des Rosiers, a former Liberal member of the Legislative Assembly of Ontario. Dr. James Orbinski was announced as principal on August 16, 2024.

During the 2006–07 academic year, Massey College hosted the King and Queen of Sweden, held a special tribute in honour of the founding head of the college, Robertson Davies, and was the host of the Man Booker International Prize in April 2007.

== Grounds and architecture ==
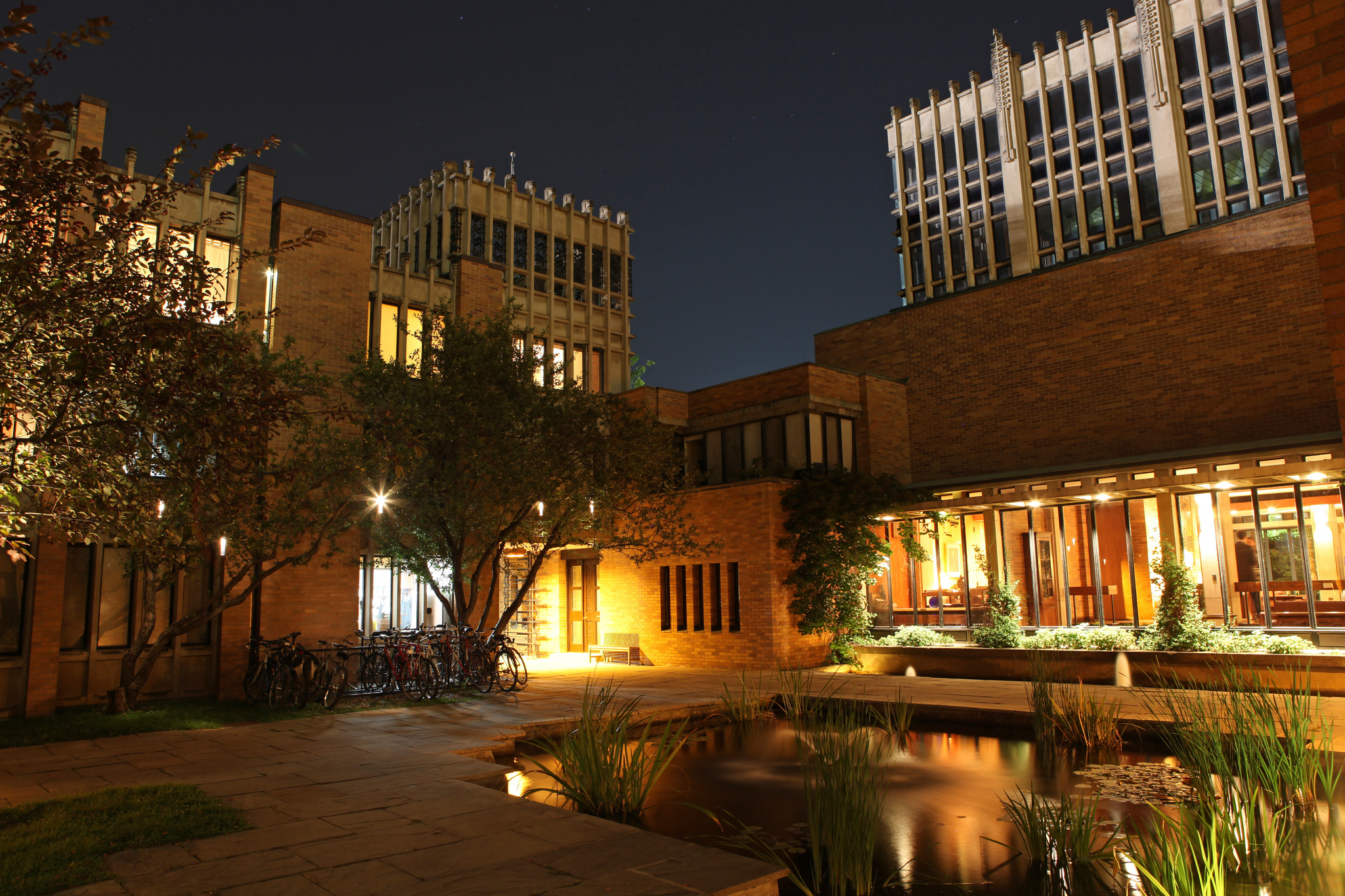
The pond in the quad provides constant sound which muffles the city noise from beyond the college walls

Located on the St. George campus of the University of Toronto, Ron Thom's design for Massey College was inspired by the medieval Oxbridge style college with influence from Frank Lloyd Wright and the Arts and Crafts movement. As in Oxford and Cambridge, the buildings of Massey College all centre around one court which is accessible through only two gates. The main gate is at the foot of the tower, along with the porter's lodge. The quad contains a large pond with fish and fountains as well as the St. Catherine's Bell in the clock tower attached to the porch. The bells are rung three times a day during the school term to mark meal times. Around the quad are a total of five residence houses on the east, north, and west sides. The ground floors of these houses contain some administration offices. The largest building, containing the majority of the public space available to members of the fellowship, is on the south side along with the principal's house. Public space at Massey College includes the large dining hall, a small private dining room, a college common room and bar, an upper library, the lower library, the "puffy couch room" (an informal common room with television and games), the Colin Friesen seminar room, a computer room, and non-resident study carrels.

The building went against many architectural trends of the 1960s, using ornament and eschewing exposed concrete. Initially drawing a mixed reception from architectural critics, its reputation has since grown. The college buildings are frequently studied by architecture students. In 2013, which marked its 50th anniversary, Massey College received two prestigious architecture awards. The 2013 Prix du XXe siècle, awarded by The Royal Architectural Institute of Canada, recognizes "the enduring excellence of nationally significant architecture, such as landmark buildings in the historical context of Canadian Architecture. The award can go to a building in Canada, designed by an architect from any country, or a building anywhere designed by a Canadian architect." The commentary from the award’s jury reads as follows: "Massey College is a skillful and humane interpretation of Arts and Crafts sensibilities in a modernist idiom. It is remarkable for its seamless integration of exterior and interior design, including the rich detailing of its custom furnishings and fittings. It has aged well, and is one of the University of Toronto’s most treasured modern buildings." The 2013 Landmark Award was awarded to Massey College by the Ontario Association of Architects. "Recognizing buildings that demonstrate architecture’s beauty, endurance and lasting contribution to the community and to society", a Landmark building "establishes a design excellence standard for future generations, enhances its environment and the public realm, recognizes and respects its surroundings; and contributes to the neighbourhood, the community or the city through its unique identity." Fall 2013 issue of Perspectives magazine, published by OAA, was dedicated to Ron Thom and featured Massey College. Witold Rybczynski describes the building as "intriguing" from the outside and the quad as "masterful".

The Robertson Davies Library, also known as the lower library, houses the college's librarian as well as an office for the University of Toronto's Book History and Print Culture Program. This library contains display cases for exhibitions curated from the collection by Book History students and Massey students.

The Library includes a collection of working 19th century printing presses. The Library's Bibliography Room has the largest collection of wood type in North America (some 350+ pieces). Several working hand presses are housed here. The most frequently used presses are two Albion presses, an Imperial Press, and a Washington Press. Some students work here as apprentices under the college printer. Printed keepsakes for college events are often made here.

=== Chapel Royal ===
Massey College is home to an ecumenical worship space, St. Catherine's Chapel, which Vincent Massey wanted included to "symbolize the position that religion should have in a house of learning." The interior was originally designed by stage-set designer Tanya Moiseiwitsch and features a 17th-century Russian iconostasis and cross, as well as a portativ pipe organ specially designed for the sanctuary by organ builder James Louder, from Quebec. The chapel was extensively redesigned in 2006 by the College architects, Brigitte Shim and Howard Sutcliffe, and rededicated in June of the following year.

St. Catherine's became Canada's third chapel royal in Canada on 21 June, National Indigenous Peoples Day, 2017, in recognition of the sesquicentennial of Canada, the relationship between Massey College and the Mississaugas of the Credit First Nation, and as a gesture of reconciliation. The Chapel acknowledge the history of the Royal Proclamation of 1763 and its ratification by the Treaty of Niagara in 1764. It is the first interdenominational and interfaith chapel royal and the only one with its own title in an Indigenous language.

== Fellowships ==
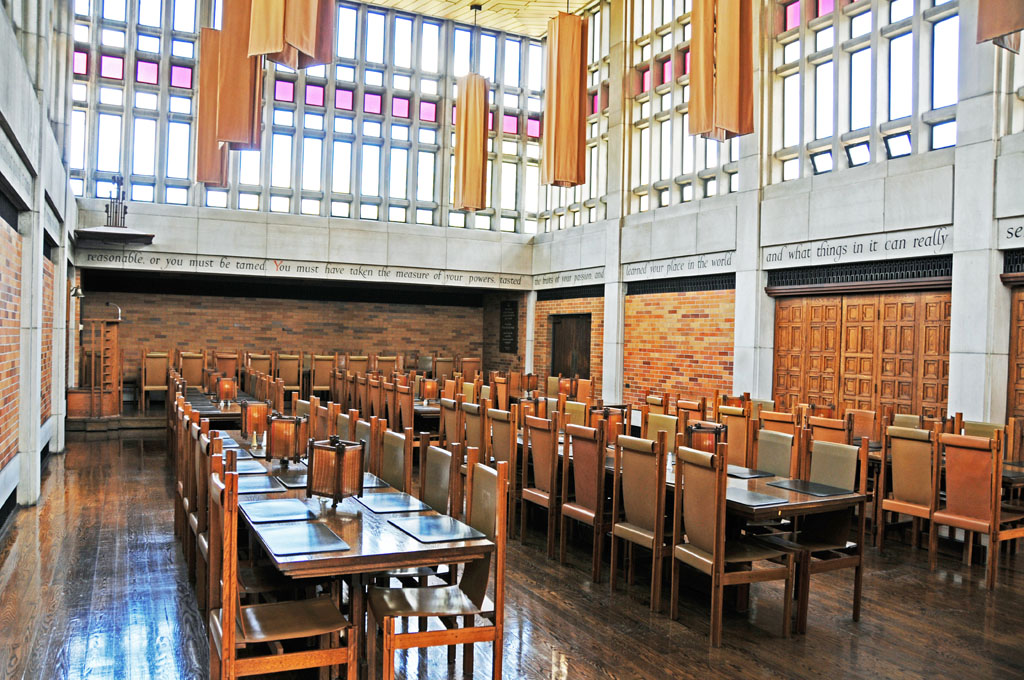
Ondaatje Hall, the main dining hall of the college used for daily meals and High Table dinners

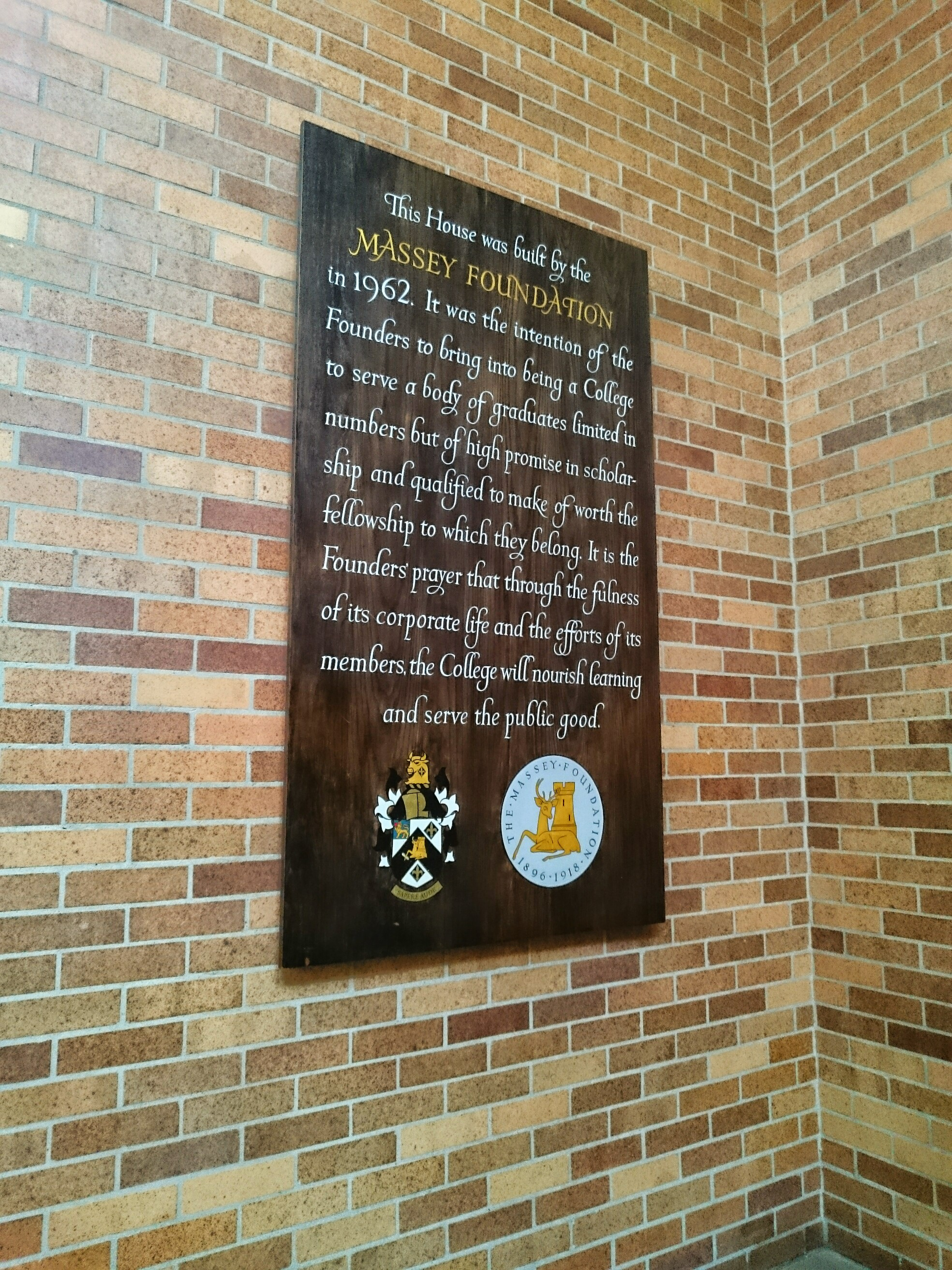
This inscription hangs in the main stairwell of Massey College, which reads: "This House was built by the Massey Foundation in 1962. It was the intention of the Founders to bring into being a College to serve a body of graduates limited in numbers but of high promise in scholarship and qualified to make of worth the fellowship to which they belong. It is the Founders' prayer that through the fulness of its corporate life and the efforts of its members, the College will nourish learning and serve the public good."

Junior Fellows are postgraduate students "of distinguished ability" at the University of Toronto, either in the study of art and sciences subjects or a professional discipline such as law, engineering, or medicine. Resident Junior Fellows can live in the college for up to three years before becoming non-resident Junior Fellows for another two years. Typically, about sixty Junior Fellows are resident and another ninety are non-resident. Each year, new prospective Junior Fellows apply to the college to be elected by the governing corporation. Junior Fellows are elected based on:

- academic achievement;
- scholarships and honours; and
- community engagement outside academia.

Junior Fellows of the college have included Bernard Amadei, Roger S. Bagnall, Claire Battershill, Andrew Battershill, Dawn R. Bazely, Anne Bayefsky, Warren Cariou, Yeon-Koo Che, Phil De Luna, Eve Egoyan, Carol Hansell, Alister Henskens, Tajja Isen, Padriac Kenney, Vladimir J. Konečni, Catherine Manoukian, Brian McGing, Sharon Moalem, Jacqueline Murray, Chika Stacy Oriuwa, Julie Payette, K. K. Seet, Joseph Tabbi, Vahid Tarokh, Donna Vakalis, Diana Valencia, Douglas N. Walton, Michael Wex, and Oliver Whitehead.

Journalism Fellows are distinguished mid-career Canadian and international journalists who are selected annually by a special committee that includes the president of the University of Toronto, the head of Massey College, and other members appointed by them. Journalism Fellows stay at the college for one academic year from September to May. The college participates in the Canadian Journalism Fellowship Program (formerly known as the Southam Fellowship) and the Scholar-at-Risk program for international scholars caught in sectarian, political or religious intolerance. Additionally, the college hosts a writer-in-residence chosen each year by the college and the University of Toronto's department of English.

Senior Fellows are elected from members of the University of Toronto faculty and other individuals who represent the academic and professional interests of the university. Senior fellows can serve as members of the governing board. The college also hosts visiting academics, generally on sabbatical leave, who are given the title of Senior Residents.

Notable Senior Fellows and Senior Residents of the college have included Haroon Siddiqui, John Polanyi, Ursula Franklin, Barbara Sherwood Lollar, Mikhail Baryshnikov, Margaret Atwood, Sir Christopher Ondaatje, James Orbinski, Peter H. Russell, Janice Stein, Michael Ignatieff, Adrienne Clarkson, Beverley McLachlin, Hal Jackman, John Ralston Saul, Michael Bliss, Anthony Pawson, Julie Payette, Chantal Hébert, Sir Graham Watson, Rosalie Abella, Bob Rae and Zainub Verjee.

The former chancellor of the University of Cambridge (Prince Philip, Duke of Edinburgh) and the chancellor of the University of Oxford (Chris Patten) both served as Distinguished Honorary Fellows. The Chief of the Mississaugas of the New Credit First Nation (currently Chief Stacey LaForme) is the third honorary Senior Fellow.

== Governance ==
Massey College operates as a charity that is legally registered with the Canada Revenue Agency charities directorate as The Master and Fellows of Massey College. The governing body of Massey College is its Governing Board, composed of 26 Senior Fellows and chaired by the elected member of the board, with the president of the University of Toronto and the dean of Graduate Studies both serving as ex officio members. Additionally, three other ex officio members are nominated to the governing board by the Massey Foundation. Massey College relies on income derived from its own endowments and endowments held for its purposes by the University of Toronto, supplemented by other income from its catering facilities and summer rental programs.

The Visitor is the ceremonial and constitutional head of the college. Officers of the college, who report to the head of the college, include the bursar, the dean and the librarian. Junior Fellows and Senior Fellows are elected to their positions by the governing board at one of its quarterly meetings. The Quadrangle Society consists of individuals who are not fellows of the college, and serves as a bridge between Massey College and the non-academic community.

Massey College is one of three exclusively graduate residential colleges in Canada which are modeled on the Oxbridge system, along with Green College and St. John's College, University of British Columbia. Massey College is the only one of the three that is self-governing.

=== Principals of Massey College ===
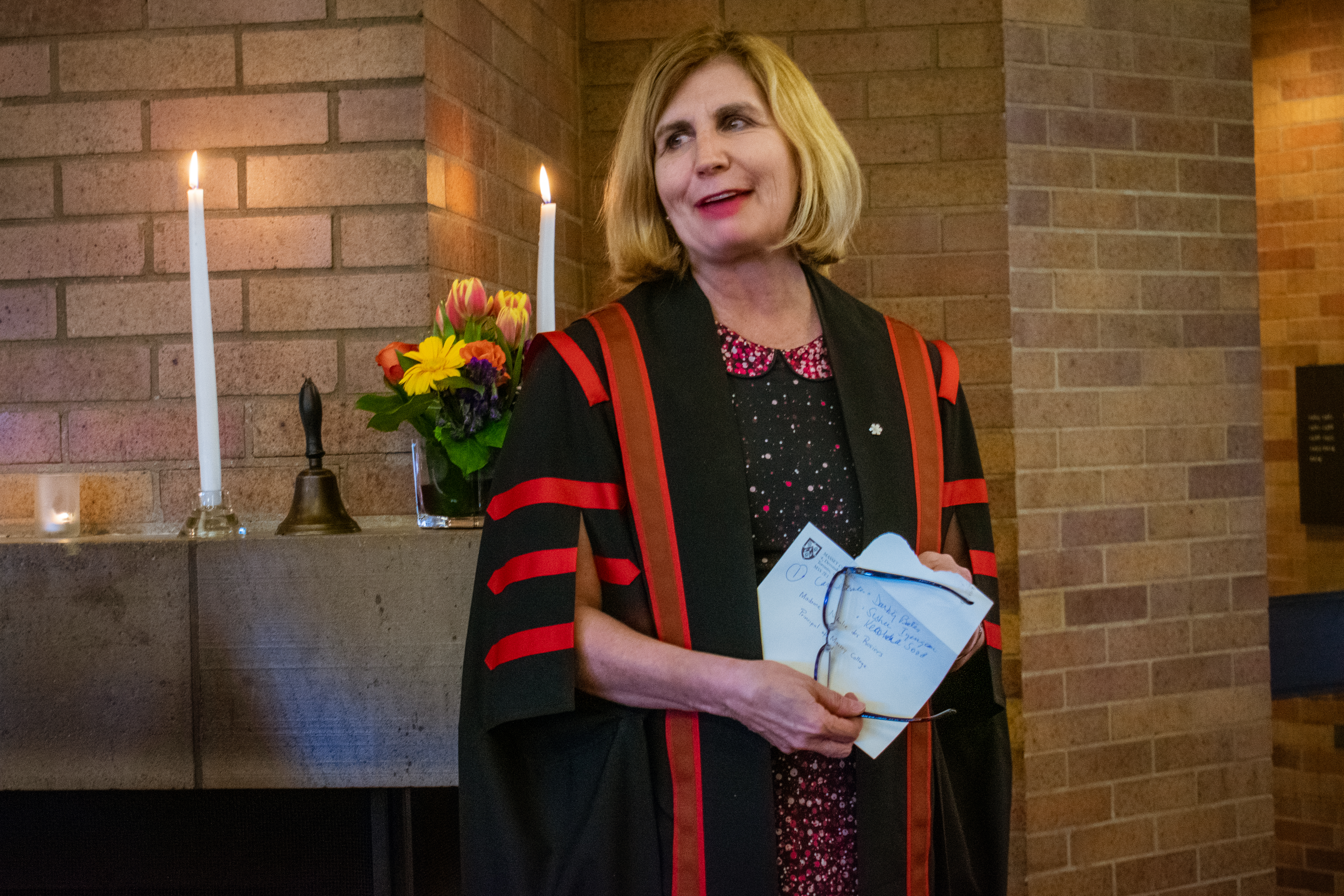
Nathalie Des Rosiers, sixth Principal of Massey College

(formerly Masters of Massey College, until 2018)

1. Robertson Davies (1963–1981)
2. Patterson Hume (1981–1988)
3. Ann Saddlemyer (1988–1995)
  - Stefan Dupré (Interim, 1991–1992)
4. John Fraser (1995–2014)
5. Hugh Segal (2014–2019)
6. Nathalie Des Rosiers (2019–2024)
  - Jonathan S. Rose (Interim, 2024)
7. James J. Orbinski (2025–present)

In February 2018, the title of 'Master' of Massey College was changed to 'Principal' due to concerns regarding the title's authoritarian and racist connotations.

=== College Visitors ===
1. Vincent Massey (1963–1967)
2. Dalton C. Wells (1973–1976)
3. John Black Aird (1990–1995)
4. Rose Wolfe (1996–2003)
5. H.N.R. Jackman (2003–2016)
6. Beverley McLachlin (2016–2020)
7. Robert Prichard (2020–2025)
8. Robert Rae (2025–present)

== Activities ==
Exterior of the college

Massey College sponsors the annual Massey Lectures broadcast across the country on CBC as well as the Walter Gordon Symposium on Public Policy. In conjunction with the University of Toronto's School of Graduate Studies, Massey fellows organize an annual symposium of interest to the broader community. There is an annual magazine for all its constituent members: Senior and Junior Fellows, Alumni (which include former Senior Residents, and members of its Quadrangle Society (non-academic community members).

Massey Grand Rounds (MGR) is composed of members of the Massey College community, including physicians, medical students and graduate students in areas related to medicine and health sciences. It convenes monthly during the school term and serves as a discussion forum for topics related to medicine, the health sciences, and issues of interest to students. Guest Mentors attend regularly. Planning for the Annual MGR Symposium is a significant element of these gatherings. The group is guided by Dr. Aubie Angel, CM, MD, FRCPC, Senior Resident/Fellow, President of Friends of CIHR.

The Janet Rossant Lectureship was established at Massey College in 2018 in recognition of Dr. Rossant's distinguished career as a scientist, scholar, builder and leader in medical research. Her dedicated mentorship of young scientists and scholars is reflected in the purpose of this honour. This Lectureship will attract accomplished visiting scientists to engage graduate students and faculty members alike, as part of the Massey Grand Rounds (MGR) program at Massey College.

The college has a strong connection to the Canadian establishments and Canadian journalism. The college also strives to preserve an Oxbridge-type atmosphere by mandating the wearing of gowns at dinner, and incorporating regular High Tables—into its schedule; and balances this with very active outreach programs. The mandated goal of the college is to demonstrate through its corporate life the interconnectedness among all learning.

Massey College also hosts its own Junior Fellow Lecture Series, sometimes called WIDEN-Massey, where graduate student members of the community are invited to talk about their research in a general way to their non-specialist peers.

Local and national arts organisations are affiliated with the college. Many college events feature singers from the Canadian Opera Company or musicians from the Talisker Players as well as many talented Junior Fellows who share their music after supper or at events.

== Clarkson Laureateship in Public Service ==
The Clarkson Laureateships in Public Service are the highest honour the College awards annually to members of its community. Over the years, notable philanthropists, academics, community organizers, politicians, and activists have been awarded a Clarkson Laureateship, including Ursula Franklin, William Davis, and Mary Eberts.

The awarding of Clarkson Laureateships was approved by the Governing Board in 2003 and the first awards were given out in 2004, during the final year that Madam Clarkson, a Senior Fellow of the College, was Governor General of Canada. The award honours her many years of service to Canada by recognizing those members of its community who also contribute to the common good.

The Laureateships are usually awarded at the first High Table in January in the presence of the Laureates’ families and Massey College peers. It is tradition for the Laureates to donate the monetary component of the award to a charitable cause of their choosing, often detailed in their acceptance speech. The evening somewhat echoes the ceremonies Madam Clarkson presided over for the Order of Canada when she was Governor General and she herself attends, often joined by past Clarkson Laureates, to honour the awardees.

== Cultural references ==
Massey College was used by David Cronenberg as a location for his 1970 film Crimes of the Future. In 2021, it was used as a location for Star Trek: Discovery. In 2023, Massey College appeared in the Amazon prime superhero series "Gen V"
