= Newcastle, Ontario =

Newcastle
- Unincorporated community
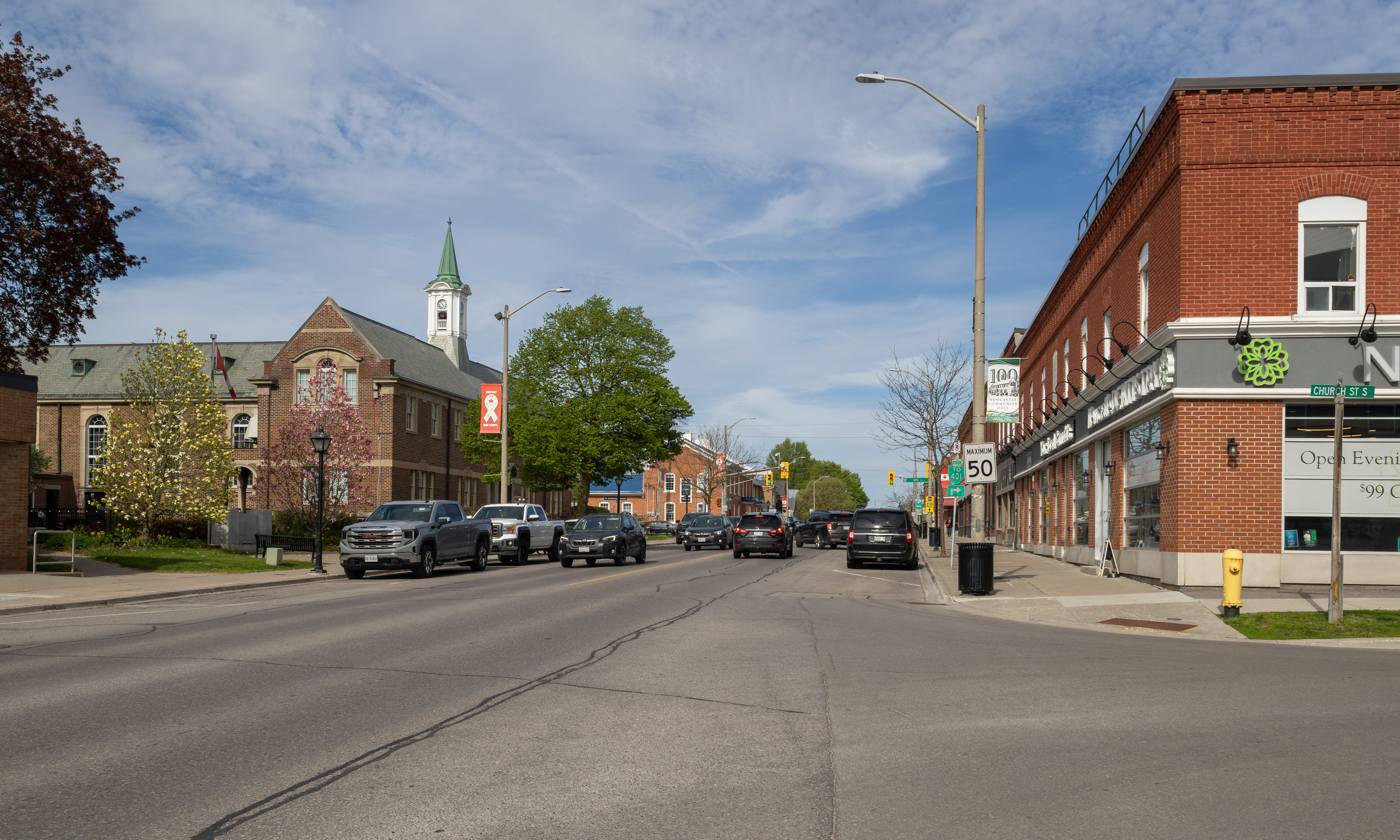
- King Avenue, Downtown Newcastle

- Location within Southern Ontario
- Coordinates: 43°55′2″N 78°35′23″W
- Country: Canada
- Province: Ontario
- Regional Municipality: Durham
- Municipality: Clarington
- Incorporated (town): 1856

Government
  - Type: Municipality
  - Mayor: Adrian Foster
- Elevation: 150 m (490 ft)

Population (2016)
  - Total: 9,167
- Time zone: UTC-5 (EST)
  - Summer (DST): UTC-4 (EDT)
- Forward sortation area: L1B, L1C
- Area codes: 289, 905
- NTS Map: 030M15
- GNBC Code: FERHE

Newcastle is a community in the municipality of Clarington in Durham Region, Ontario, Canada. The community inherits the former name of the present-day municipality which it belongs to.

Newcastle is located about 80 km east of Toronto, and about 18 km east of Oshawa and Bowmanville on Highway 401. It is also the southern terminus of Highway 35 and Highway 115. It has been named one of the best small towns in Ontario, by Comfort Life, a website for retirement living in Canada.

== History ==
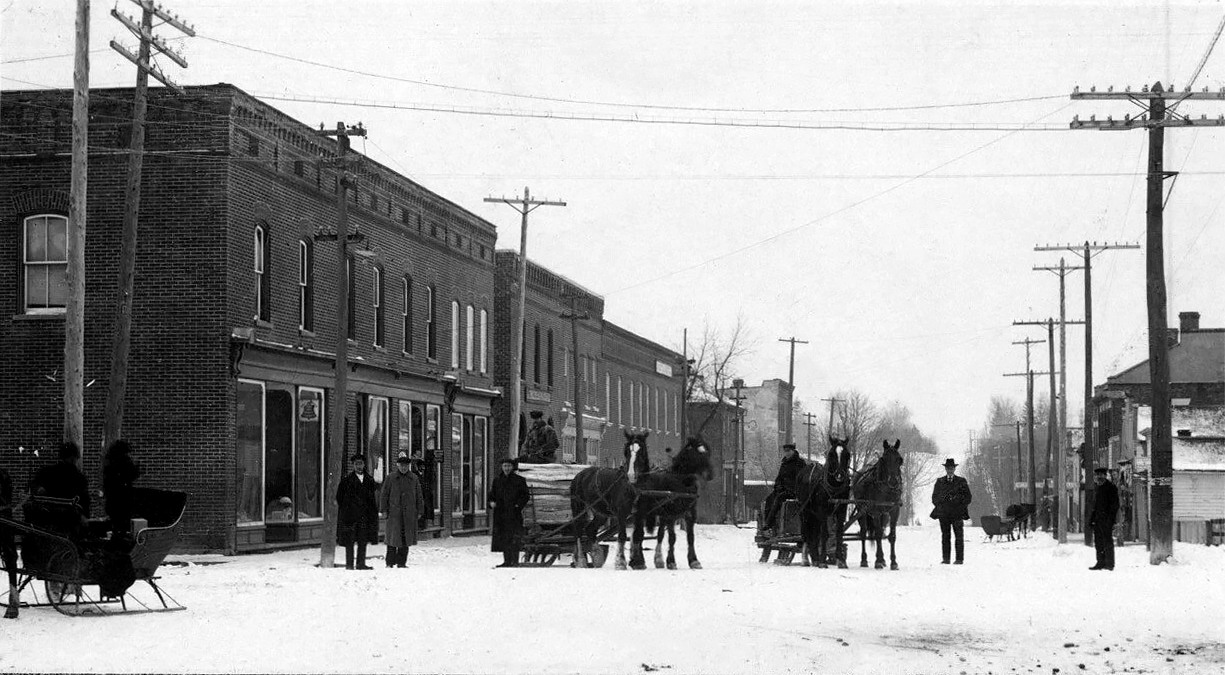
Downtown Newcastle, c. 1910

Newcastle was incorporated as a town in 1856. It remained a small community until the 1990s, when new residential development began and the population quickly swelled. Newcastle had a jail in the late 1800s. Maps of Newcastle from those years have not been discovered. Many have tried to find the location of this jail, but it is believed that it was either demolished or destroyed by the elements. There are jail cells in the Newcastle Community Hall.

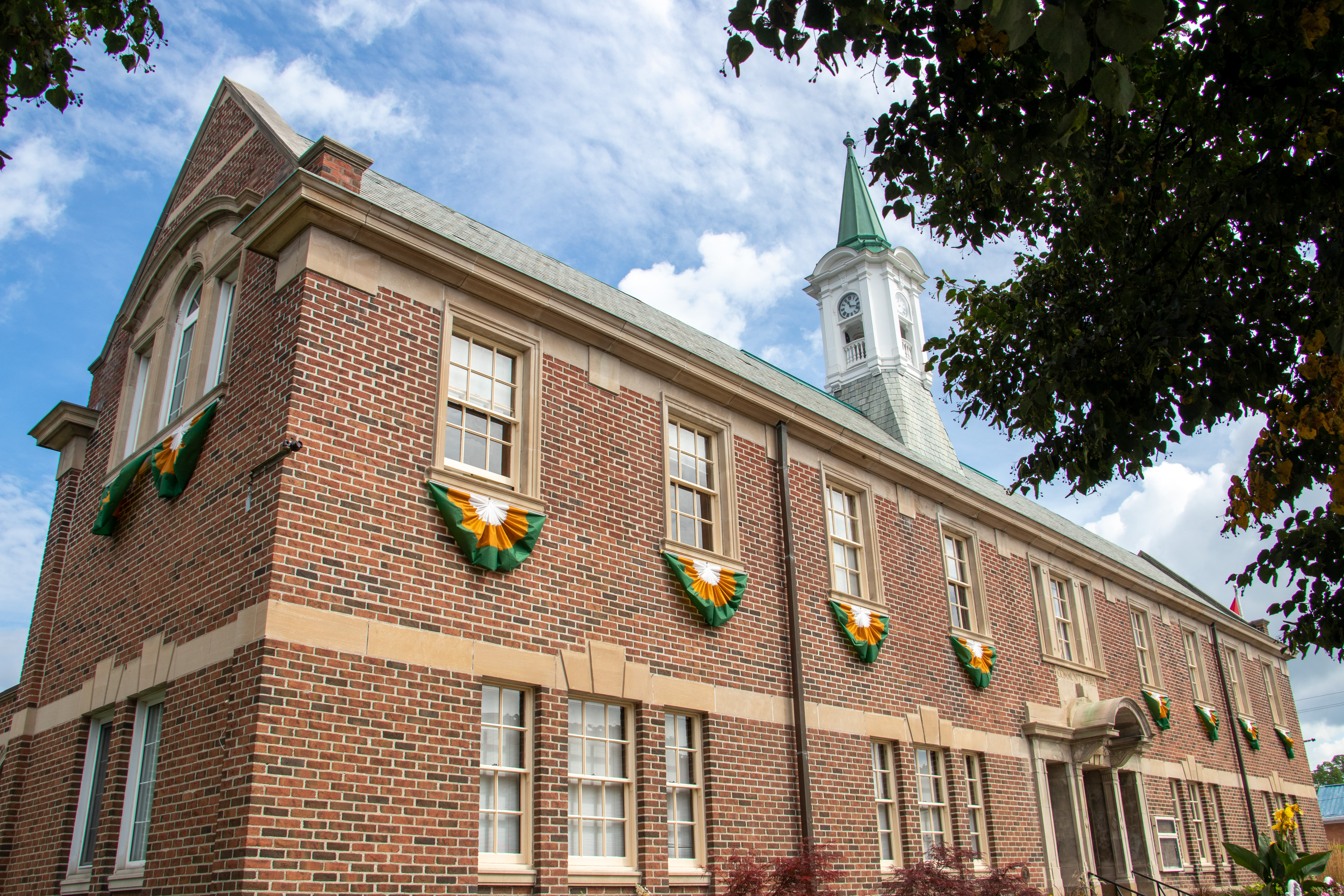
The Newcastle Community Hall was built in 1923, originally serving as a Post office, library, theatre and council chamber.

Newcastle is surrounded by farms raising cattle, pigs, apples, grain, and corn. The town has a community hall, donated by the Massey family, one public high school (Clarke), two public elementary schools (Newcastle Public School and The Pines Senior Public School), one Catholic elementary school (St. Francis of Assisi), a post office, churches, a few plazas, several small parks, six restaurants, a recreation complex, an ice arena, a new fire hall, two grocery stores, professional offices, hardware stores, a marina on Lake Ontario, and a golf course (Newcastle Golf Course).

=== Post office ===
The first Post office was opened in Newcastle in 1845 with John Short serving as Postmaster. Since that time, Newcastle has had ten postmasters with Charles Gray being the last (in 1991). Following Gray's retirement, Canada Post closed the Post Office since it was deemed too small. Most rural route and suburban mail is now handled by the Bowmanville Canada Post.

== Notable residents ==
- Joseph E. Atkinson (December 23, 1865 – May 7, 1948) was a Canadian newspaper editor and activist. Under his leadership, the Toronto Star became one of the largest and most influential newspapers in Canada.
- Charles Brent, Bishop of the Episcopal Church of the United States, born and raised in Newcastle in 1862, served in the Philippines, and helped establish St. Luke's Hospital (now St. Luke's Medical Center) as a healthcare mission.
- Chalk Circle, a 1980s rock band, was formed in the village. They had hits in Canada with songs like "April Fool," "Me, Myself and I," and "Sons and Daughters," a song about the negative effects of free trade with the United States.
- Susan Kane Doyle, Author of the Nationally Award Winning book, Cooking Wild Style, and long time cooking editor of Ontario Out of Doors, winner of the Pete McGillen Award also lives in the village.
- Louis G. Lalande (March 11, 1935 - February 23, 2022) was a retired pipefitter and community volunteer. In 1999, while manning a booth for the Knights of Columbus' annual charity raffle near a bank at a mall in Oshawa, he foiled a bank robbery by striking the assailant about the head and shoulders with a metal folding chair. The pistol the assailant was brandishing at the time turned out to be a starting pistol, but this was unknown to Lalande and the bank's occupants at the time. Lalande was subsequently awarded the Medal of Bravery, and the Carnegie Medal for Heroism.
- Daniel Massey, whose farm implement business eventually formed Massey Ferguson.
- Tara Watchorn, member of Canada women's national ice hockey team who won a gold medal at 2014 Sochi Winter Olympics.
- Samuel Wilmot was believed to live here. He had a great influence on the village, and became interested in the salmon in 1860 and built a "fish hatchery" at Newcastle - one of the world's first. Wilmot Creek, a neighbouring community, was named after him.

== Town of Newcastle (1973–94) ==
The name "Town of Newcastle" was used from 1973–94 for the municipality now called the Municipality of Clarington. The name was changed in 1994 to alleviate longstanding confusion between the municipality as a whole and the community of the same name. The community was commonly known as "Newcastle Village" to distinguish the two. It was also a confusing fact that Bowmanville had a larger population than "Newcastle Village", and it also housed the former Town of Newcastle's municipal offices, causing some to believe the town should have been called "Bowmanville" instead of "Newcastle" during that period.

== Nearest places ==
- Newtonville, east
- Orono, north
- Bowmanville, west
- Bond Head, south
