= 399 (disambiguation) =

399 can refer to:

- The years 399 BC and 399
- 399 (number), a natural number

== Locations ==
- List of highways numbered 399
- Rural Municipality of Lake Lenore No. 399, a rural municipality
- 399 Park Avenue, a 41-story office building
- 399 Fremont Street, a residential skyscraper
- Building at 399 West Fullerton Parkway, an apartment

== Vehicles ==
- Massey Ferguson 399, a powerful tractor in the 300 series range
- British Rail Class 399, a rail vehicle
- German submarine U-399, a Type VIIC U-boat
- USS YP-399, a fishing vessel

== In astronomy ==
- 399 Persephone, an asteroid
- NGC 399, a barred spiral galaxy
- Collinder 399, an alternate name of Brocchi's Cluster

== Other uses ==
- List of United States Supreme Court cases, volume 399
- Grizzly 399, a grizzly bear
- Minuscule 399, a Greek minuscule manuscript of the New Testament
- LA 399 (film), a film
