= Massey Ferguson =

French manufacturer of agricultural equipment

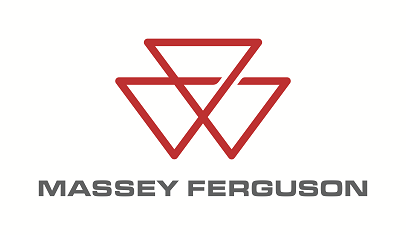
- Type: Subsidiary
- Industry: Agricultural machinery
- Predecessors: Massey-Harris Limited; Ferguson Company
- Successor: Varity; AGCO
- Headquarters: Beauvais, France
- Area served: Worldwide
- Products: Tractors, Combine harvesters, Forage harvesters, Grape harvesters, Sugarcane harvesters, Balers, Front loaders, Hay rake, Plough tools, Telescopic handlers
- Parent: AGCO
- Website: masseyferguson.com

Massey Ferguson is an agricultural machinery manufacturer, established in 1953 through the merger of farm equipment makers Massey-Harris of Canada and the Ferguson Company of Northern Ireland. It was based in Coventry then moved to Beauvais in 2003 when the Coventry factory was shut down.

== History ==
=== Massey Manufacturing Co. ===
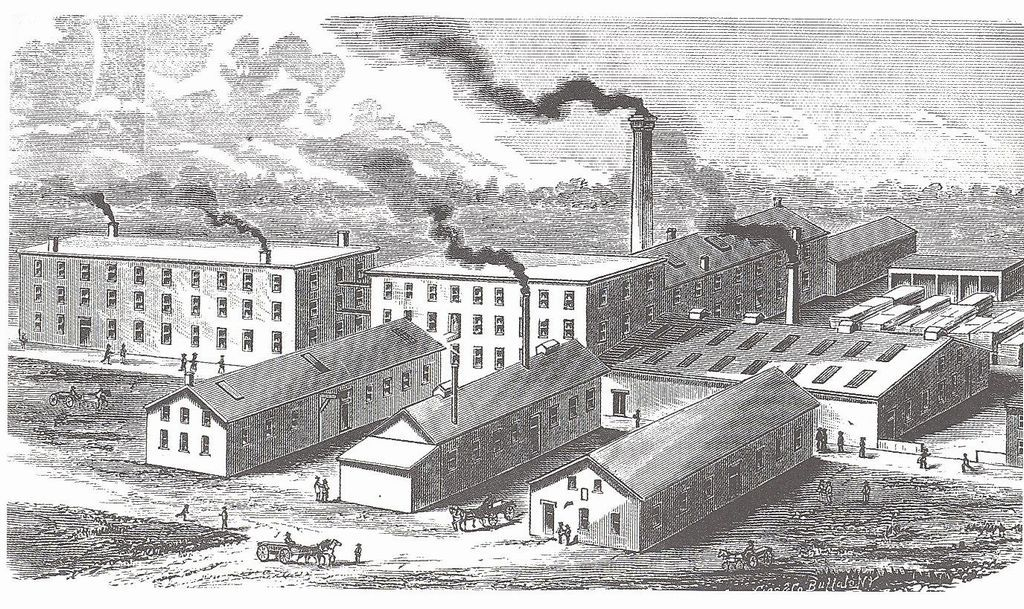
Illustration of the Massey factory in Newcastle, Ontario, circa 1879

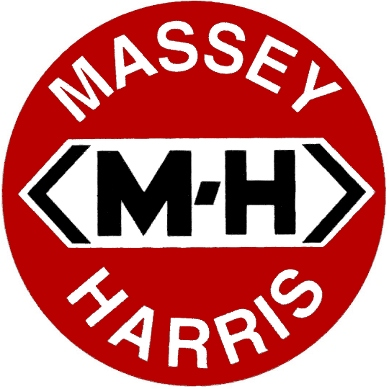
Massey-Harris logo, c. 1952

In 1847, Daniel Massey established the Newcastle Foundry and Machine Manufactory in what is now Newcastle, Ontario. The company made some of the world's first mechanical threshers, at first by assembling parts from the United States, but eventually designing and building its own equipment. Daniel Massey's son, Hart Massey, renamed the enterprise the Massey Manufacturing Co.

In 1879, the company moved to Toronto and it soon became one of the city's leading employers. It was located on King Street West at Strachan Avenue, occupying the former Toronto exhibition grounds, the site of Toronto's Crystal Palace, just south of the Provincial Lunatic Asylum and north of the Central Prison. The huge complex of factories, consisting of a 4.4-hectare (11-acre) site with plant and head office at 915 King Street West (now part of Liberty Village), became one of the best-known features of the city. The company expanded further and began to sell its products internationally. Through extensive advertising campaigns, it became one of the most well-known brands in Canada. A labor shortage throughout the country also helped to make the firm's mechanized equipment very attractive.

=== A. Harris, Son & Company ===
1857 marked the purchase of a foundry by Alanson Harris near Beamsville, Ontario which he put to use for the creation of farm implements. Beginning machinery types included hand rakes and pitch forks.

In 1863, he welcomed his son John into the business, thus forming the business name, A. Harris, Son & Company.

In 1871, John Harris acquired the rights to the Kirby mower and the Dodge rake for distribution in Canada from the D.M. Osborne and Company of Auburn, NY.

A move to Brantford took place in 1872, and the company's marketing reach spread beyond Ontario to the western Canadian provinces.

=== Massey-Harris Limited ===
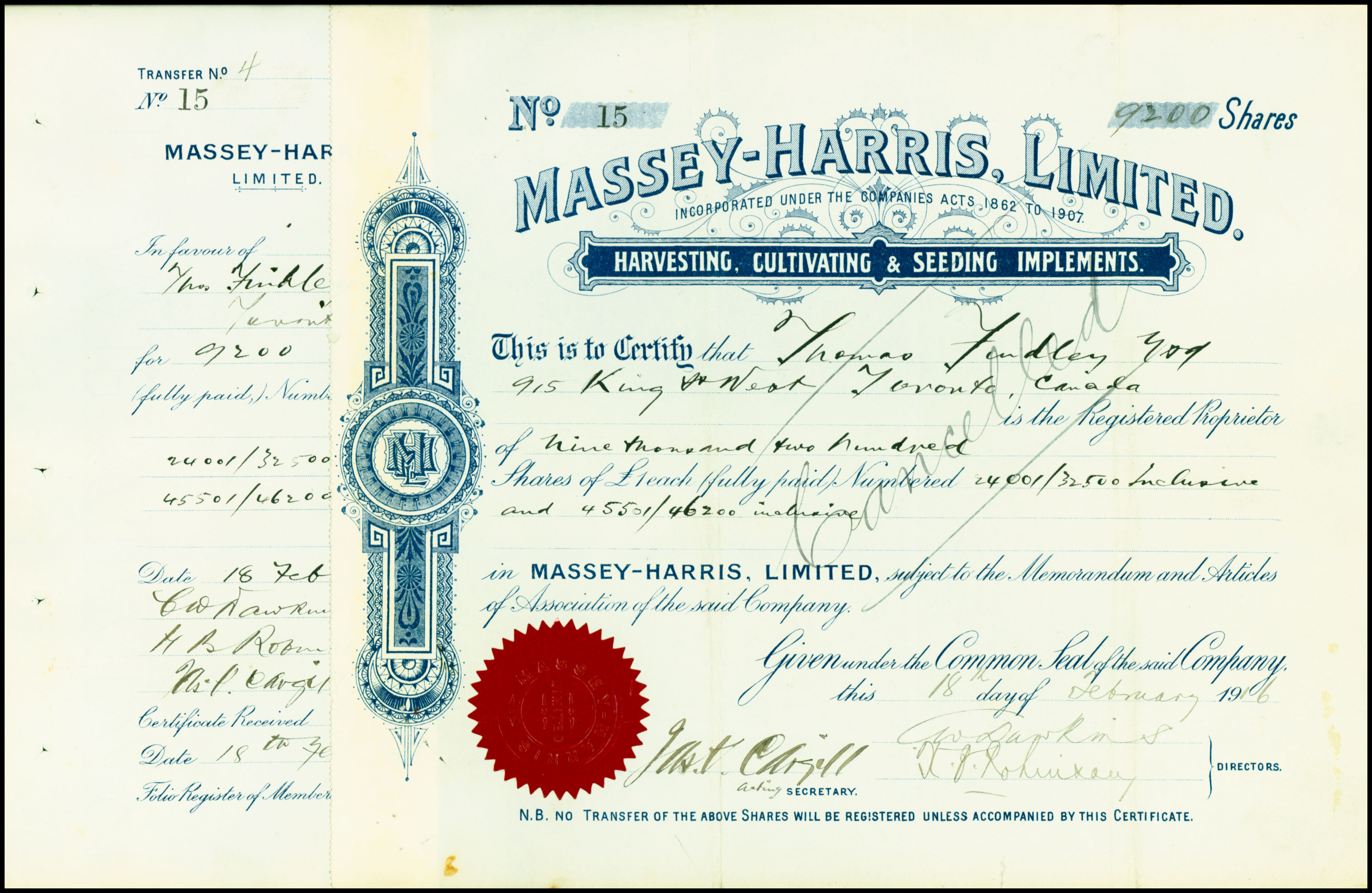
Share of Massey-Harris Limited, issued 18 February 1916

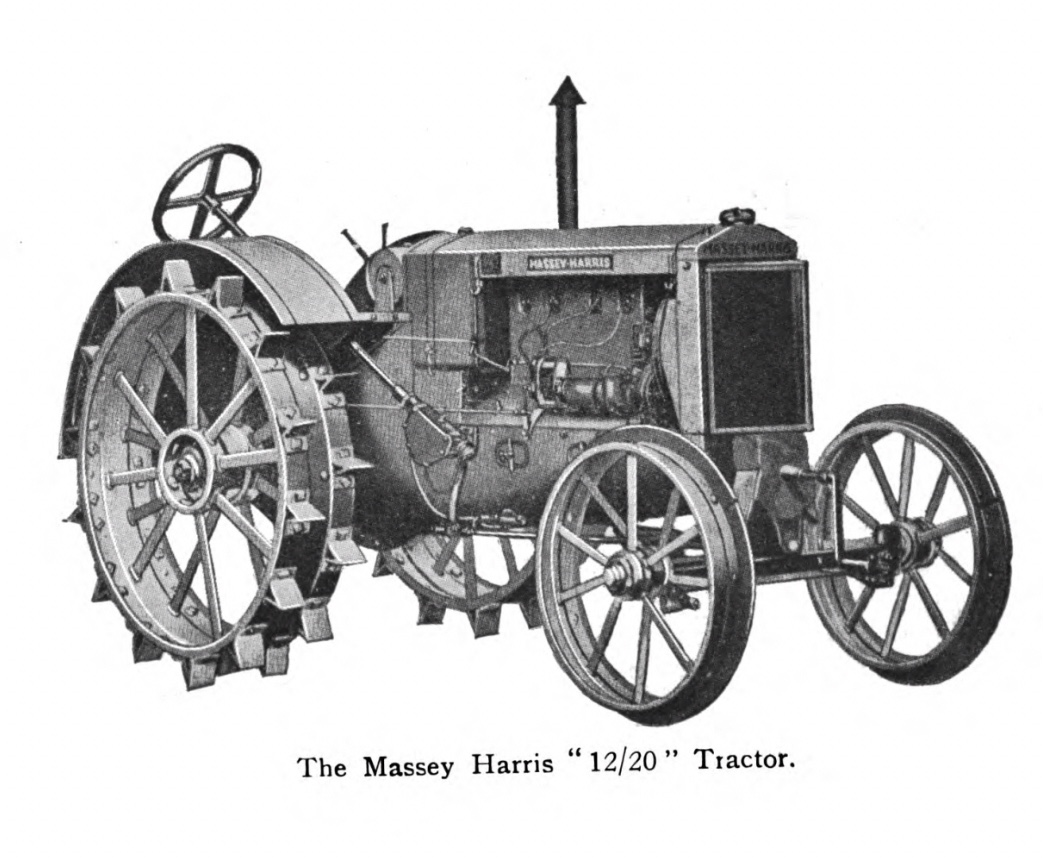
Massey-Harris 12-20 (1930-1935)

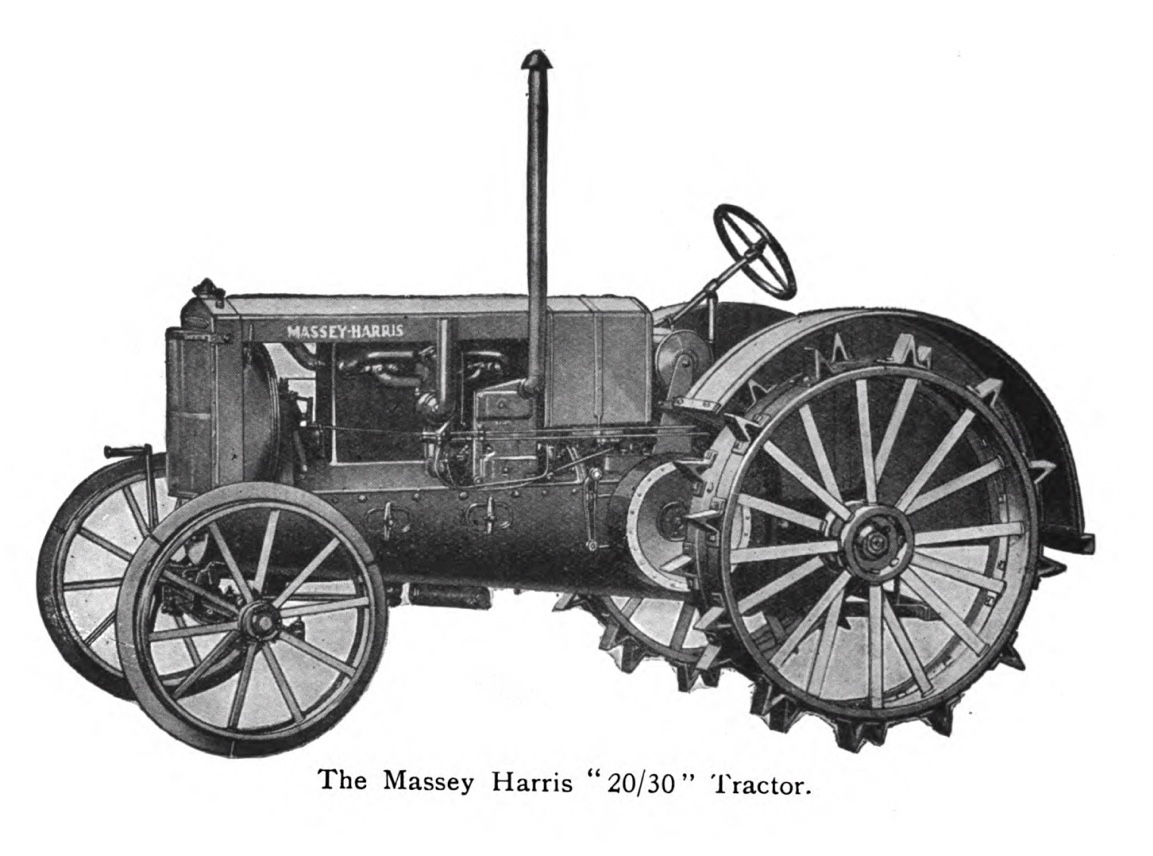
Massey-Harris 20-30

In 1891, the Massey Manufacturing Co. merged with A. Harris, Son and Company to form Massey-Harris Limited, which became the largest agricultural equipment maker in the British Empire. Massey-Harris made threshing machines and reapers, as well as safety bicycles, introducing a shaft-driven model in 1898. In 1910, Massey-Harris acquired the Johnston Harvester Company of Batavia, New York, making it one of Canada's first multinational firms.

Hart Massey's sons Charles, Walter, Chester and Fred became closely involved in the business and eventually took over its operations. They were the last generation of Masseys to run Massey-Harris. President Vincent Massey left to become a minister in the Mackenzie King government. In 1927, an unsolicited takeover offer from an unnamed US purchaser precipitated a power struggle for control of the firm. The US bid was turned down, and control remained in Canadian hands with the sale of the Massey's stock for CA$8 million to Thomas Bradshaw and J.H. Gundy of Toronto. Members of the family accomplished other things in business. Vincent Massey later became Governor General of Canada. Raymond Massey became a noted actor in American films. The Massey family used its fortune to improve the city of Toronto and many institutions including the University of Guelph, University of Toronto, Upper Canada College, Crescent School, Appleby College, Massey Hall, and Metropolitan United Church were partially financed by the Masseys.

The company's early tractor models included the 20 horsepower Massey-Harris GP 15/22 (1930–36), 25 horsepower 'Massey-Harris Pacemaker' (1936–1939), 35 horsepower Model 101 (1938–1942), Massey-Harris Pony, Model 20, Model 81, and Model 744.

Grain harvesting was revolutionized by Massey engineer Tom Carroll in 1938, with the world's first affordable, mass-produced, self-propelled combine— the No. 20. It was too heavy and expensive for extensive mass production, but served as a guide for the design of the lighter and less costly No. 21, which was tested in 1940 and put on sale in 1941. The Massey-Harris No. 21 Combine was commemorated with a Canada Post stamp on 8 June 1996. Massey-Harris also produced one of the world's first four-wheel drive tractors.

E.P. Taylor, one of C.D. Howe's dollar-a-year men, joined the board of directors in 1942, and Eric Phillips joined management in 1946. The company became one of the prime jewels of the Argus Corporation.

The final generation of Massey-Harris tractors, introduced immediately after World War II, included the 25-horsepower M-H 22 series, the 35 horsepower M-H 33 series, the 45 horsepower M-H 44 series and the 55 horsepower M-H 55 series. In 1952, the M-H 22 was replaced by the M-H 23 Mustang. In 1955, the 30-horsepower Massey-Harris 50 was introduced after the merger that created Massey-Harris-Ferguson. It was based on the Ferguson TO-35 and was also produced as the F-40 for Ferguson dealers. The MH-50 was available in several configurations: utility, high-crop utility, or row-crop with a choice of single, tricycle, or wide adjustable front ends. In 1956, the M-H 33 was replaced by the MH 333, while the M-H 44 was replaced by the M-H 444 and the M-H 55 was replaced by the M-H 555. The tractors were commonly known as the "triple series" and were mechanically similar to their predecessors, however they featured new styling which included a slightly different hood design, chrome trim on the grill and hood, and a different color scheme. They were also available with power steering, live power take-off (PTO), and hydraulics. The Massey Harris triple series tractors remained in production until 1958.

==== Military contracts ====
During World War II and afterwards Massey Harris undertook a number of contracts to produce tractors, tanks and self-propelled artillery vehicles for the United States Armed Forces. Vehicles produced by Massey Harris include the following:

- M5 Stuart light tank (250 M5s, and 3,530 M5A1s built)
- M24 Chaffee light tank
- M41 Howitzer Motor Carriage self-propelled artillery (built on M24 chassis)
- M44 self propelled howitzer (250 built in early 1950s on M41 Walker Bulldog tank chassis)
- M36 Jackson tank destroyer
- M19 Multiple Gun Motor Carriage Self-propelled anti-aircraft artillery vehicle (300 built)
- I-162 Military tractor built for the United States Army (25 built)
- I-244 Military tractor built for the United States Air Force, United States Navy, and United States Army Corps of Engineers in 1955 and 1956
- I-330 Military tractor built for the United States Navy (6 built)

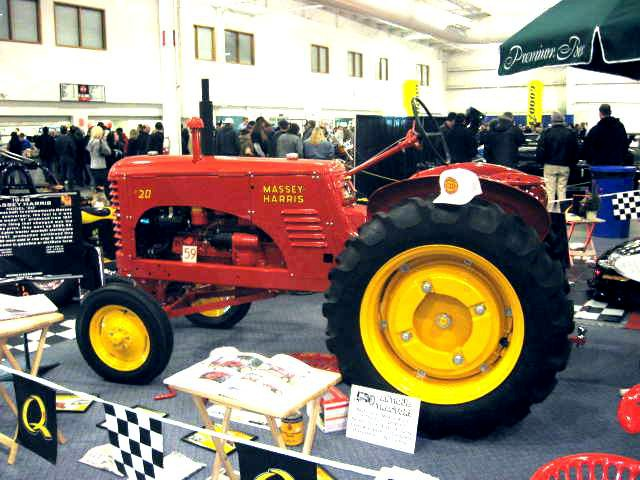
A standard-tread 1948 Massey-Harris Model 20

=== Massey Ferguson ===
In 1953, Massey-Harris merged with the Ferguson Company to become Massey-Harris-Ferguson, before shortening it to Massey Ferguson in 1958. They tried to consolidate the two dealer networks and product lines. Its television and radio advertising featured an upbeat jingle with a male chorus singing, "He's a get-up-early, keep-'em-rollin, Massey-Ferguson kind of a man." Nevertheless, the company soon began to decline financially after facing increasing international competition in the 1960s, when the firm began to struggle.

==== Hanomag-Cura, Argentina ====
In 1971, Massey purchased the local facilities of Rheinstahl Hanomag-Cura in Argentina, which had been established in 1960. The production of tractors and other agricultural implements, during until 1999. Some model numbers made in Argentina included 65R/250/252, 155, 150, 5160 S-2 / S-4, 5140 / 5140–4, 265, 255, 250, 250 S "viñatero", 8500 and 9500.

Other model numbers included 1075, 1078, 1095h, 1098, 1175 / 1175 S, 1185 / 1185 S, 1195 L / 1195 S-2/S-4, 1215 S-2 / S-4, 1340 S-2/S-4, 1360 S2/S4, 1615 L / S 1615 L, 1640, 1650, 1670, 1690, 1465, 1475 "Super alto", 1485, 1499 SX / 1499 L.

==== Sunshine, Australia ====
In 1955, Massey purchased the Australian manufacturers of Sunshine harvesters, H. V. McKay Pty Limited. Hugh Victor McKay had invented the combine harvester in 1884, the first machine to combine the functions of reaping, threshing and winnowing grain from a standing crop. By the 1920s, H. V. McKay Pty Ltd was running the largest implement factory in the southern hemisphere, covering 32 hectares (80 acres), and led the international agricultural industry through the development of the world's first self-propelled harvester in 1924.

In 1930, the H. V. McKay Pty Limited was granted exclusive Australian distribution of Massey-Harris machinery. The company was then renamed H. V. McKay Massey Harris Pty Ltd; and throughout World War II, the company exported over 20,000 Sunshine drills, disc harrows, and binders to England to facilitate the increase in food production.

In 1955, the remainder of H. V. McKay Pty Ltd was sold to Massey Ferguson. Massey Ferguson (Australia) took over Critchton Industries Bundaberg plant in 1967 and transferred all cane harvesting machinery from Sunshine to Bundaberg in 1968. Critchton Industries was renamed Massey Ferguson Cane Equipment in 1971 the year in which the MF201 combine chopper harvester won the Prince Philip Prize for Australian Design. The company ceased manufacturing in Australia in 1986, and the last section of the Sunshine factory complex was sold off and demolished in 1992. The former bulk store, factory gates, and clock tower, the memorial gardens and church, and the former head office buildings remain extant and were separately-added to the Victorian Heritage Register.

==== Landini ====
In 1959, Massey bought 100% of Landini which is based in Italy. Landini has built many models for Massey over the years, especially vineyard and crawler models. Massey sold 66% to ARGO SpA in 1989, another percentage later to Iseki, and the final part was sold to ARGO in 2000.

==== Perkins ====
In 1959, Perkins Engines from Peterborough, England was purchased. Perkins was the main diesel engine supplier for Massey Ferguson for many years. In 1990, Massey Ferguson took over Dorman Diesels of Stafford merging it with Perkins to form Perkins Engines (Stafford) Ltd. In the 1980s, Perkins purchased Rolls-Royce (Diesels) Ltd, to form Perkins Engines (Shrewsbury) Ltd. In 1994, Perkins was bought by LucasVarity, who sold it in 1998 to Caterpillar Inc., who was a major customer for Perkins's smaller and mid-sized engines; Caterpillar was a major producer of large diesel engines for stationary and mobile applications.

==== Ebro of Spain ====
In 1966, Massey purchased 32% of the Spanish tractor and auto company Ebro, or Motor Iberica. Ebro had previously built Ford tractors under license, but now began building models for Massey, and Massey models under license. Massey sold its interest to Nissan in the 1980s.

In the early 1960s, Massey Ferguson moved their head office from 915 King Street to the Sun Life Tower at 200 University Avenue in the Downtown Toronto.

In 1969, Massey Ferguson began producing a line of snowmobiles under the name "Ski Whiz". The snowmobile line was discontinued in 1977, due to a decline in sales.

==== Activities in Germany ====
In 1973, Massey purchased German Eicher tractor and many Massey-licensed Eichers were built. They later sold their interest and Dromson now owns Eicher which now builds specialized tractors for vineyards and such.

The firm purchased control of Hanomag in 1974. After a loss of $250 million over the next five years, Hanomag was sold off.

==== Conrad Black take-over ====
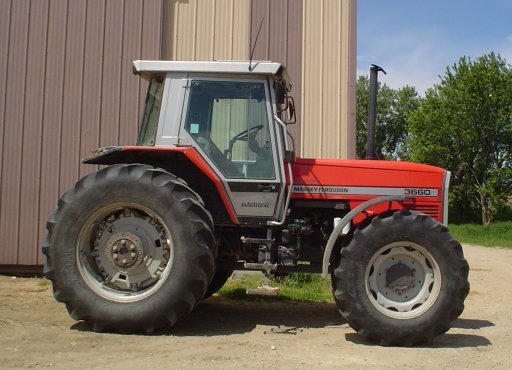
A Massey Ferguson MF 3660 tractor from the early 1990s

On 16 August 1978, Conrad Black, whose family had obtained control of Argus Corporation, an investor in Massey Ferguson, became active in Massey Ferguson's management. In 1977, chairman Albert A. Thornbrough received a $471,000 salary, the highest executive salary in Canada at the time. During the 50 years between 1929 and 1979, the firm made more than 4% profit on its sales only five times. Under Black's leadership, Massey Ferguson instituted significant cost-cutting programmes and down-sized its work force in an attempt to improve its profitability. During the late 1970s, production was relocated from Toronto to a new, large facility in Brantford, Ontario. In 1978, Massey Ferguson was the first to introduce an electronic control system for the three-point hitch on a tractor. However a worldwide decline in the agricultural equipment market combined with high inflation, high domestic interest rates and a major recession, caused Massey Ferguson to slip into a loss and seek relief from creditors. On 31 October 1979, Volkswagen AG made an informal offer for 51% of the firm, but was rebuffed by Black. On 23 May 1980, Black resigned as chairman. In a subsequent series of detailed and lengthy letters to Herb Gray—the then Canadian Minister of Industry under the government of Pierre Trudeau—he remarked on the challenges faced by the firm, and outlined his solution, which would have seen the Canadian and Ontario governments as well as Argus Corporation refloat the ailing firm. Black failed to obtain a suitable response, and resolved to cut his losses.

==== Varity ====
In October 1980, Argus donated its shares in Massey Ferguson to the employee's pension plans, leading the way to a CA$250 million bail-out from the Government of Canada and the Government of Ontario for the collapsing business, which later was renamed Varity Corporation. In 1986, Varity spun off several money-losing divisions into an entity called Massey Combines Corporation. Massey Combines Corporation was headquartered in Brantford and became insolvent on 4 March 1988, and its assets were re-acquired by Massey Ferguson.

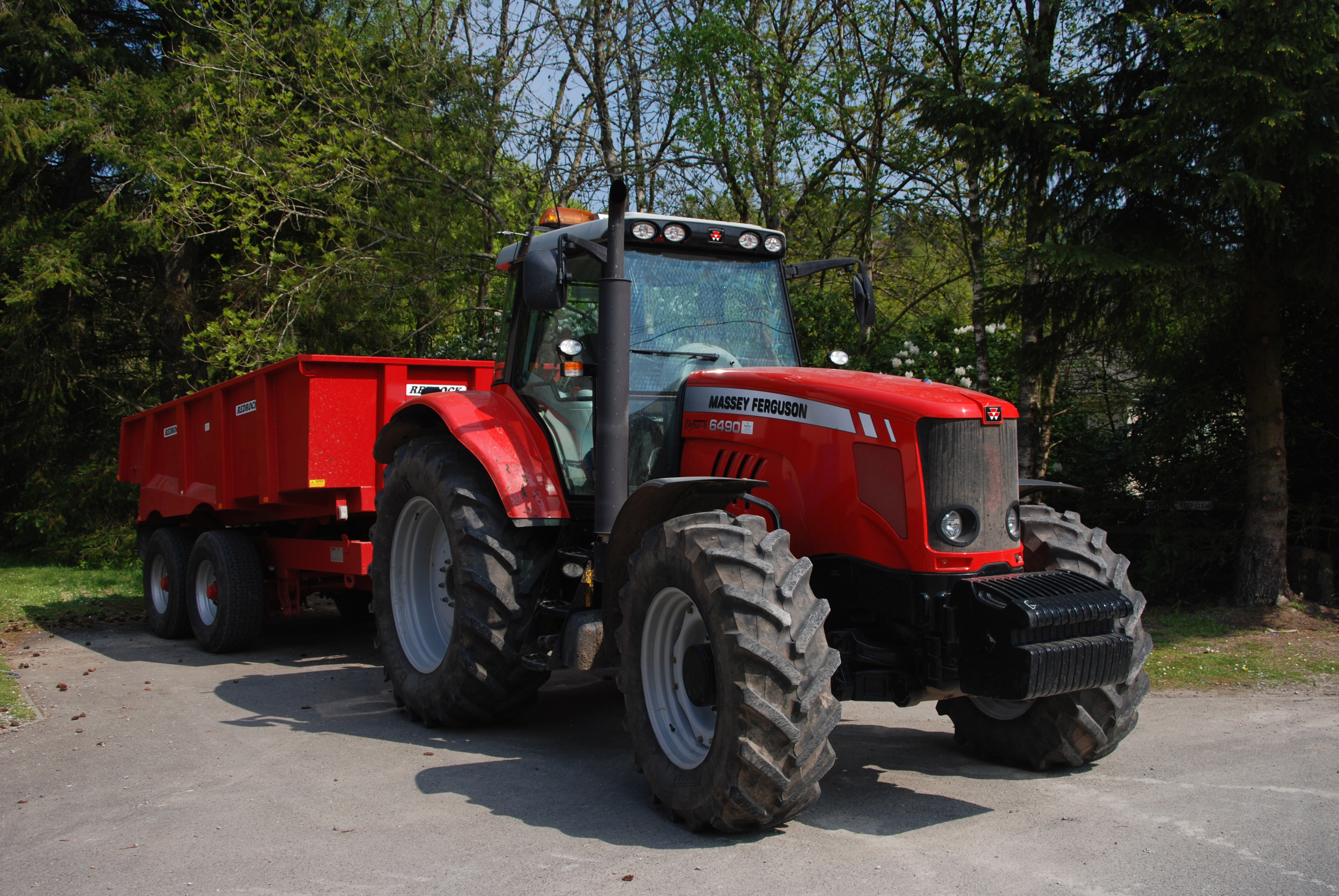
Massey Ferguson 6490 from the mid-2000s

Varity left Toronto and relocated its head office to the Williams-Butler House at 672 Delaware Avenue in the Millionaire Row area of Buffalo, New York. The Toronto manufacturing complex was demolished and the property sold and re-developed, leaving only its head office building standing. Despite its hardships, Massey Ferguson was selling 25% more tractors than its nearest competitors at this time.

In 1992, a management buyout of MF Industrial created Fermec, which ceased trading in 2001 when it was taken over by the Terex Corporation, formerly a unit of General Motors. The sale encompassed all construction equipment from Massey. It was then purchased by Case Corporation in 1997.

In 1994, Massey Ferguson's worldwide holdings were purchased by the United States–based AGCO Corporation for US$328 million in cash and $18 million in stock.

In August 1996, Varity merged with Lucas Automotive to become LucasVarity. After a series of mergers and takeovers, the remains of LucasVarity were acquired by the United States company TRW in 1999 for US$6.53 billion.

==== AGCO ownership ====
While Massey-Ferguson had a strong global presence at 20% market share in 1994, it sold 87% of its machines outside North America. The acquisition by AGCO had the aim to increase AGCO's global presence outside North America and increase Massey Ferguson's presence inside North America. In 2008, the 8600 series became the first agricultural tractor world-wide to feature Selective Catalytic Reduction emissions technology branded as e3.

In June 2012, the facility in Jackson, Minnesota was expanded to start building Massey Ferguson and comparable AGCO Challenger models for the North American market. Since production began at AGCO Jackson, the facility has produced 7600 and 8600-series Massey Ferguson tractors for the North American market. Production at the Jackson facility also included the 7700, 8700, 7700S, and 8700S Massey Ferguson tractors.

In January 2020, AGCO announced the expansion of its factory in Beauvais, France. After the expansion, the factory covered a total area of 54 ha and employed up to 2,500 people. New Massey Ferguson models are designed, built, and tested in the factory. With the completion of this factory expansion at the Beauvais location, the production of the 7700S and 8700S models in Jackson ceased and returned to Beauvais only in 2022 as the new expansion was expected to fulfill global demand for those high-horsepower tractor models. The move was made by AGCO's management due to the increased demand for the company's self-propelled application equipment and Fendt track tractors which are produced at the location in Jackson.

Since AGCO acquired the company, there has been a resurgence and expansion of the Massey Ferguson brand worldwide. Row-crop tractors have continuously been produced in the Beauvais factory since 1960 and in June 2022, the 1,000,000th tractor was produced bearing the Massey-Ferguson brand. The first tractor model from the Beauvais plant was an 825 and the millionth tractor was an 8S.305 with Dyna-VT transmission.

== Equipment offerings ==
Massey Ferguson offers the following types of equipment with different regional availability throughout the globe:

- Compact Tractors
- Utility Tractors
- Mid Range Tractors
- High Horsepower Tractors
- Hay Tools
- Planting Equipment
- Combine Harvesting Equipment
- Self-propelled sprayers
- Telemetry Systems
- Replacement Parts and Maintenance Kits

== Overview of tractor models ==
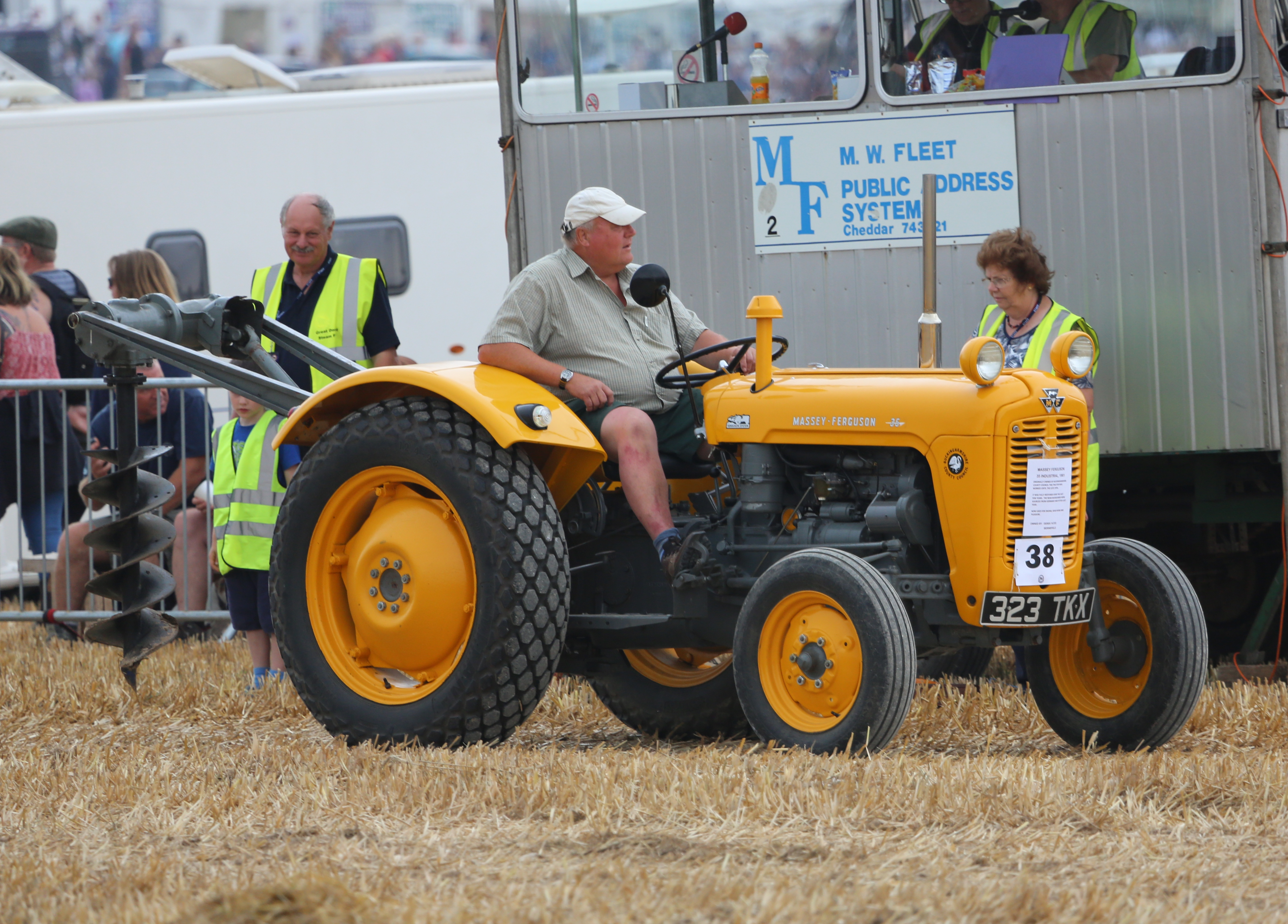
A Massey Ferguson 35

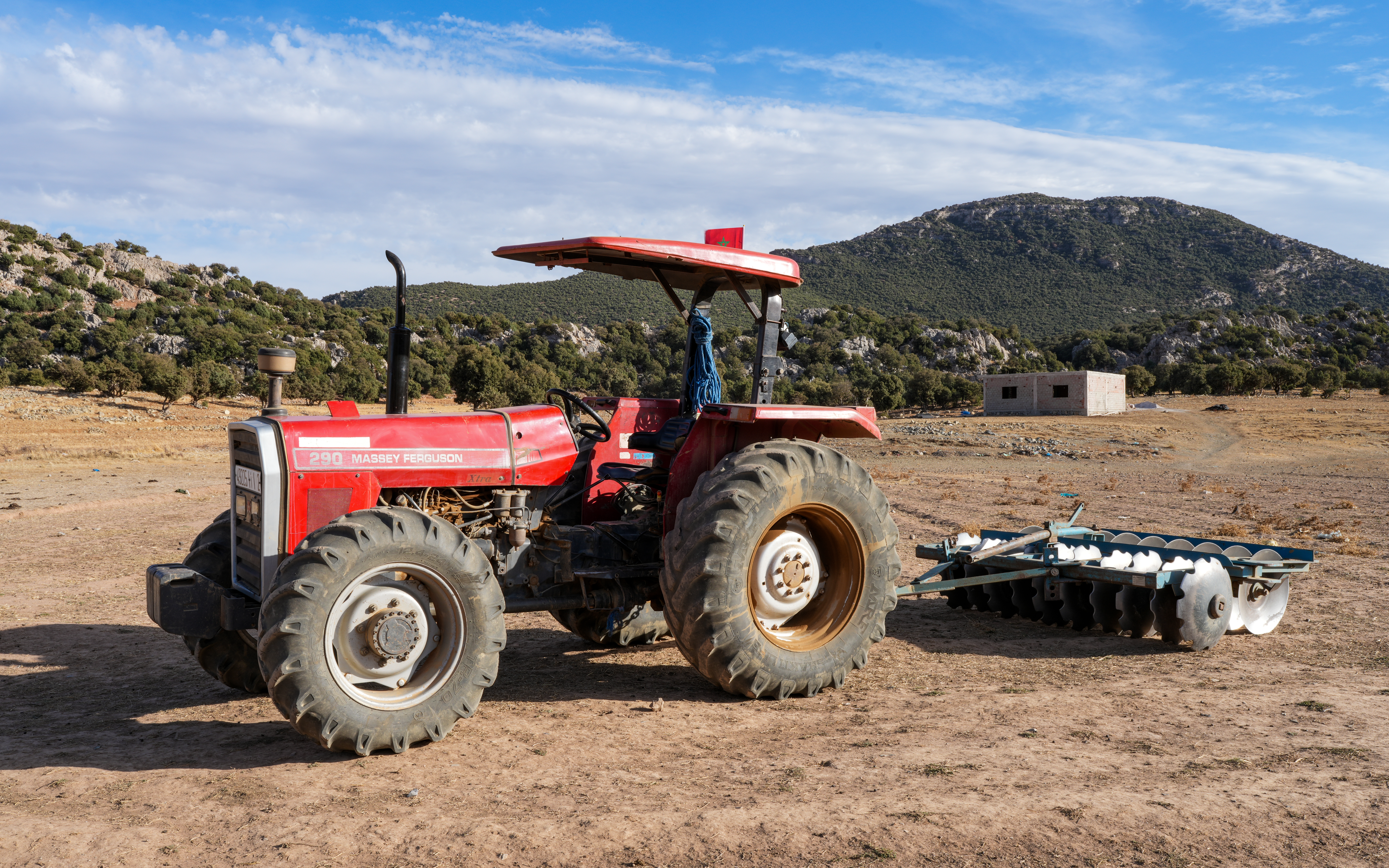
Massey Ferguson 290 with plough in Morocco

Massey Ferguson developed a wide range of agricultural vehicles and have a large share in the market across the world especially in Europe.

Beginning in December 1957, the MF35 which was the first Massey Ferguson branded tractor rolled off the factory floor. It was a Ferguson design that started its life in 1955 as the Ferguson 35, often nicknamed "Gold Belly" due to the gold engine and gearbox. The 35's were massively popular and sold across the United Kingdom, Australia, Ireland and the United States. These were followed by other early models like the 65 (MK1 indirect injection) and 65 (MK2 direct injection).

Starting in 1964, the next big selling model was the MF135 which became widely popular because of its reliability and power compared to other tractors at the time. This was the first model in the MF 100 series. These included the MF 130, 133, 135, 145, 148, 150, 158, 165, 168, 175, 178, 180, 185 and 188.

In 1969, the MF 1000 series was introduced. This model lineup included the MF 1080, 1100, 1130 and 1150.

In 1971 the first articulated tractors were introduced: MF 1500 and 1800. The smaller MF 1200 (1972) was built in Manchester for the European market.

In 1977, the MF 500 series was introduced containing the models of 550, 560, 565, 575, 590, 595 (500 series).

From the mid-1970s and early 1980s came the 200 series tractor, which included the MF 230, 235, 240, 245, 250, 255, 260, 265, 270, 275, 278, 280, 285, 290, 298, 299.

In the mid-1980s, the short-lived 600 series was released. This included the 675, 690, 690T, 695, 698 and 699. The reason behind poor sales figures was due to unattractive styling and poor ergonomics, with the cab sitting much higher than previous MF tractors. Although the cab did give excellent visibility and a flat floor, being high off the ground meant it was best suited to field operations instead of livestock work. The 600 series was one of the first tractors to offer the user an option to control where the hydraulic fluid should be pumped. By moving a switch situated near the floor of the cab, the user could block off flow to the rear hydraulics and link arms, concentrating the full force of the pump on the front loader if equipped.

In the late 1980s, one of the greatest selling tractors of all time was released- the 300 series Massey Ferguson. Excellent power, simplicity of cab, high range of gears and components made the MF 300 series a success especially in Europe. The range included the MF 340, 350, 352, 355, 362, 365, 372, 375, 382, 383, 390, 390T, 393, 394, 395, 396, 398, 399 and 399T (the most powerful and popular Massey Ferguson 399) with horsepower ranging from 45HP to 104HP. The 300 series was also offered with a choice of cab, Hi-Line or Lo-Profile. The Hi-Line cab featured a flat floor whilst the Lo-Profile cab had a hump in the middle for the transmission tunnel. Some 'original' examples of the lower horsepower 300-series have been known to fetch prices exceeding £20,000 because of their rarity.

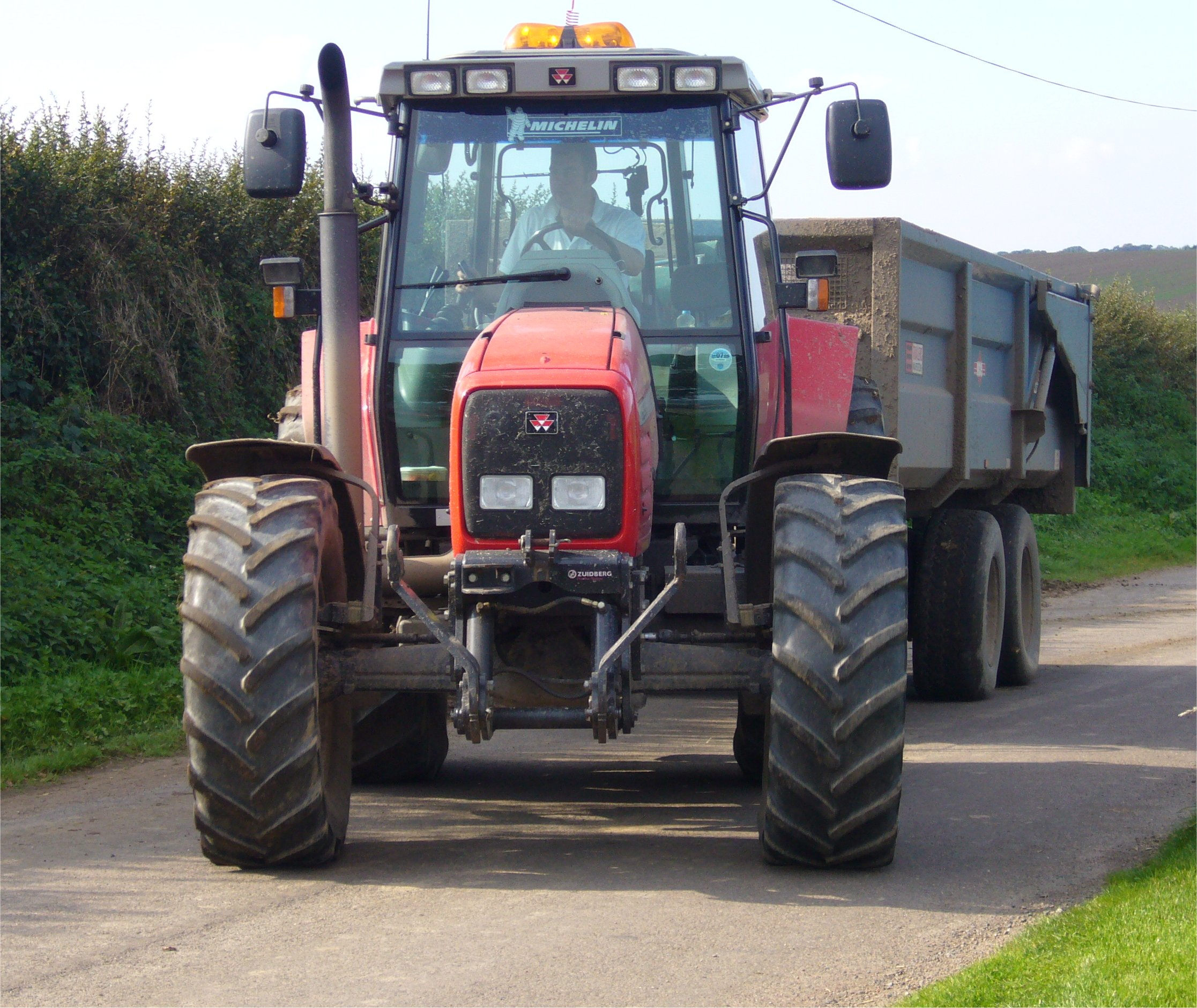
Massey Ferguson MF 6290 tractor towing a grain trailer

In the mid-1990s, the 6100 series and 8100 series were released including the 6150, 6180 and 8130.

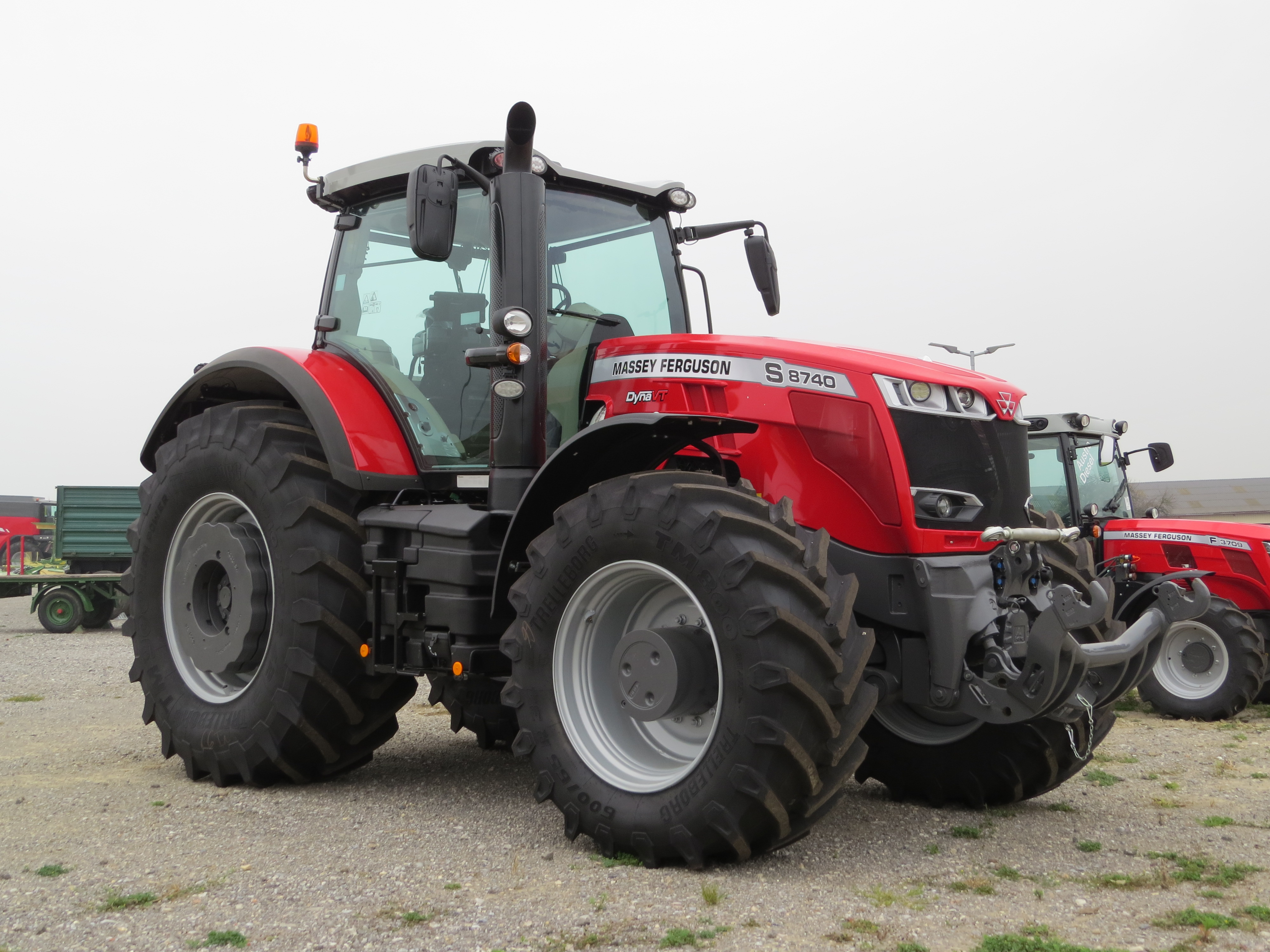
Massey Ferguson 8740 S in Austria

Tractors that came after the 300 series included:

- the 4200 range, the 4300 range, 3600 (early 1990s)
- 3000/3100 (early to mid-1990s)
- 3005/3105 (mid-1990s)
- 6100 (late 1990s), 6200 (late 1990s/early 2000s (decade))
- 8200 (late 1990s/early 2000s)
- 5400, 6400, 7400, 8400 (2004-2007)
- 5600, 6600, 7600, 8600 (2009 to 2014)
- 5700, 6700, 7700, 8700, (2014-2018)
- 3700, 4700, 5700, 6700, (global series) 5700S, 6700S, 7700S, and 8700S.

In the 2000s, the Massey Ferguson range included the 8600 series (limited markets), 5400 (limited markets), 5700S, 6700S, 7700S, and 8700S series tractors. New generation AGCO Power engines 8700 S Series provided levels of torque and horse-power unsurpassed in conventional tractor design, from the minimum of fuel. AGCO POWER 6 cylinder 8.4 L engines generated power from 270 to 405 hp.(AGCO Beauvais France) Massey Ferguson tractor production factories also built tractors marketed by AGCO under the "Challenger" brand, and also specific model ranges for Iseki.

In July 2020, Massey Ferguson launched the change of the tractor lineup, starting with the 8S Series that replaced the 7700S range.

In 2021, more models were launched. In January, the 5S Series and in September the 6S Series and 7S Series. This change also brought a new model numbering. For example, an MF 5S.105 – the "5S" stands for the series and the last three digits stands for the maximum power.

In 2022, Massey Ferguson presented the new compact tractor 1700M Series and the new specialized tractor 3S Series.

At Agritechnica in November 2023, Massey Ferguson announced the release of the 9S series, ranging in power from 285 to 425 horsepower.

In April 2025, the 5M series of tractors was announced ranging in horsepower from 95-145 to replace the 5700 and 6700 Global series.

In May 2025, the 1M series was released to replace the 1500 series sub-compact tractor.

== Product images ==
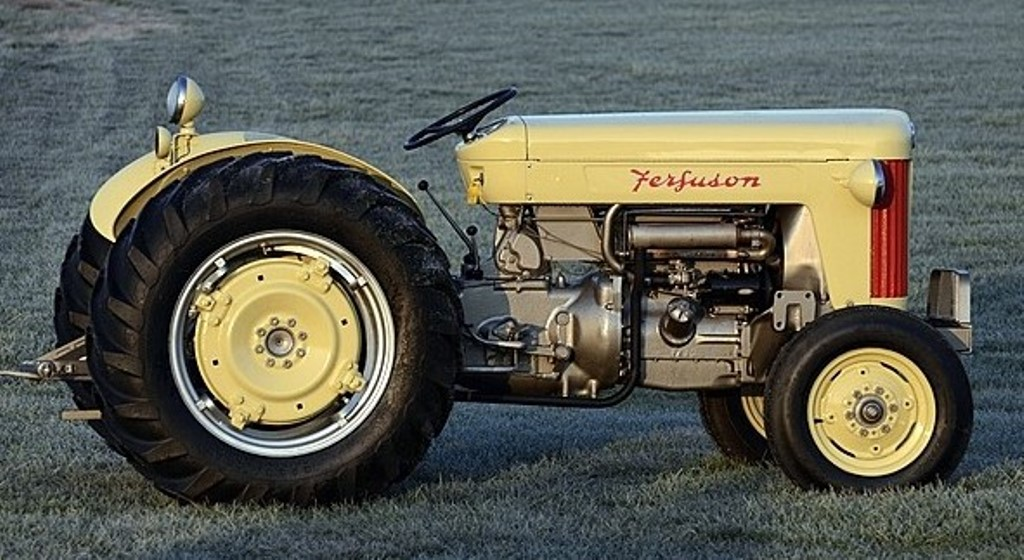
Ferguson 40

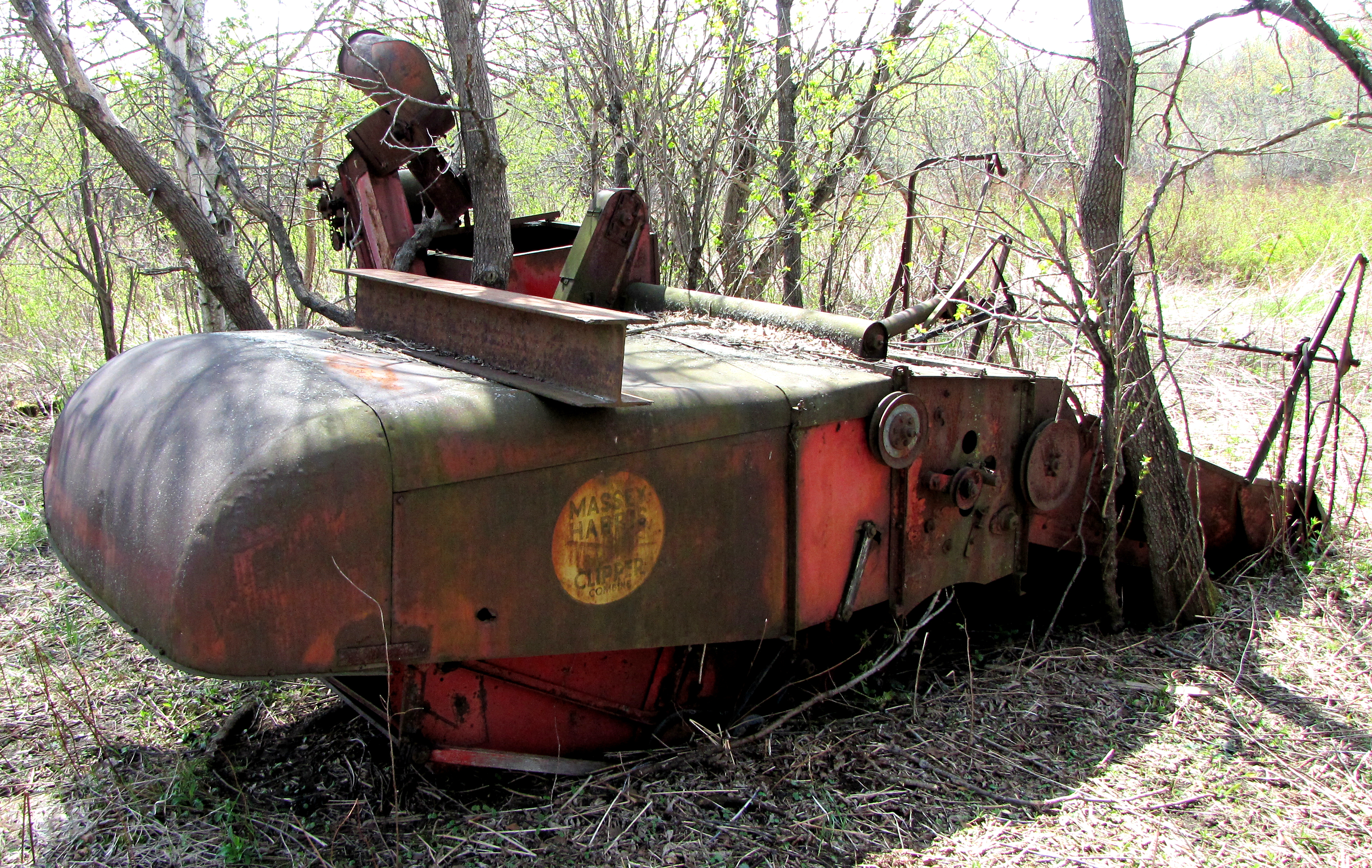
Massey-Harris Clipper Combine c. 1950

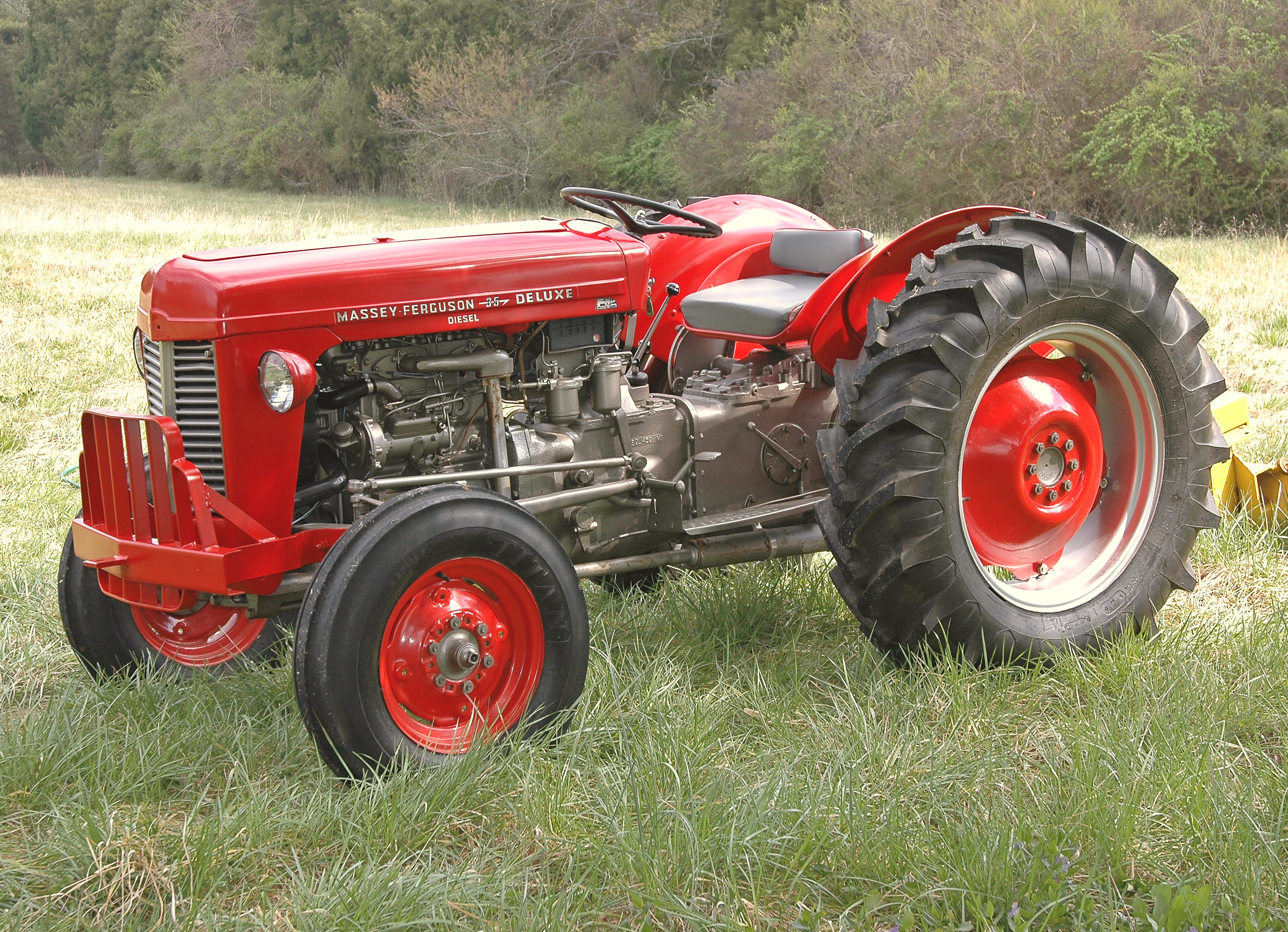
Massey Ferguson 35 (American type)

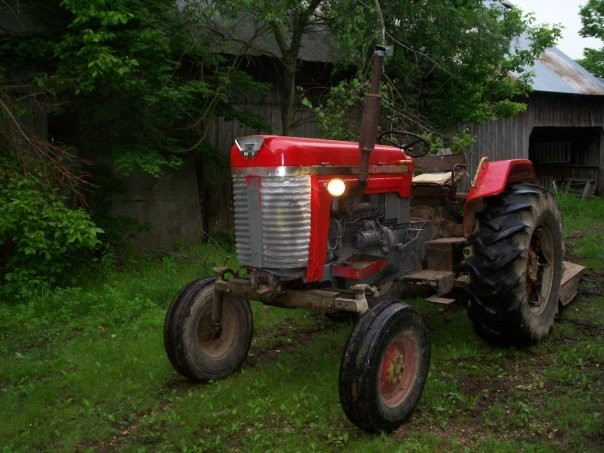
Massey Ferguson Super 90 Diesel

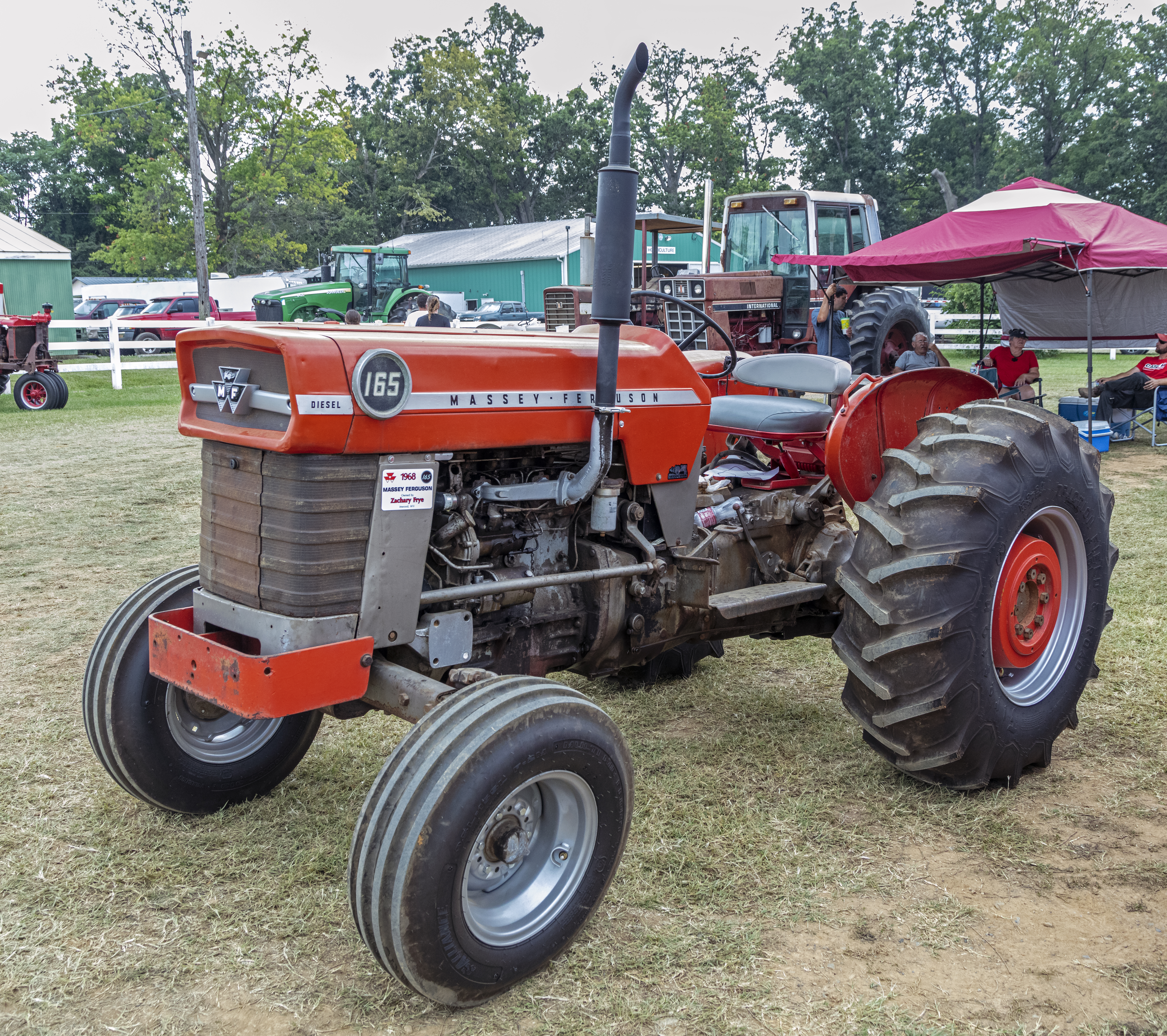
Massey Ferguson 165

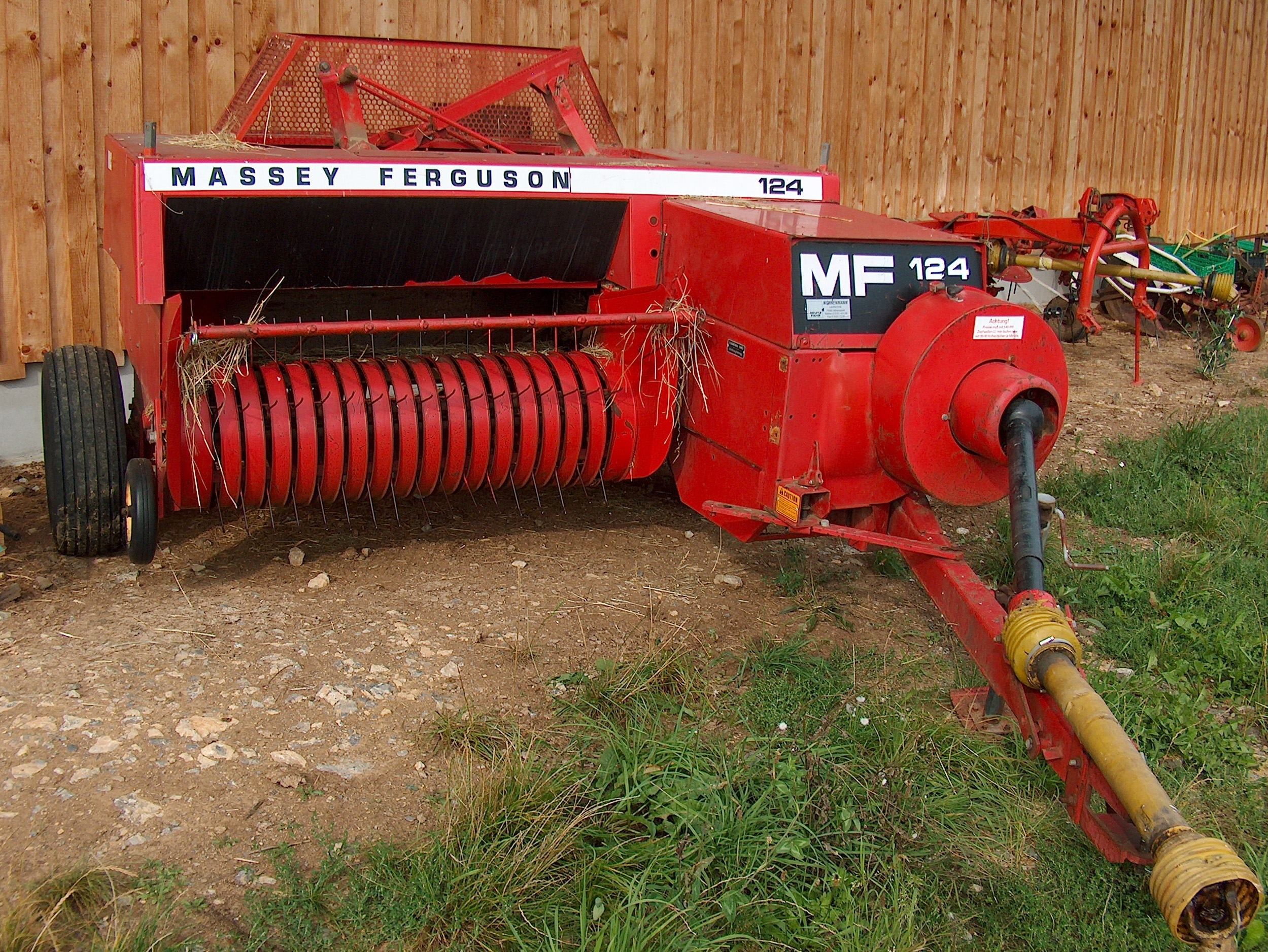
Massey Ferguson 124 Small Square Baler

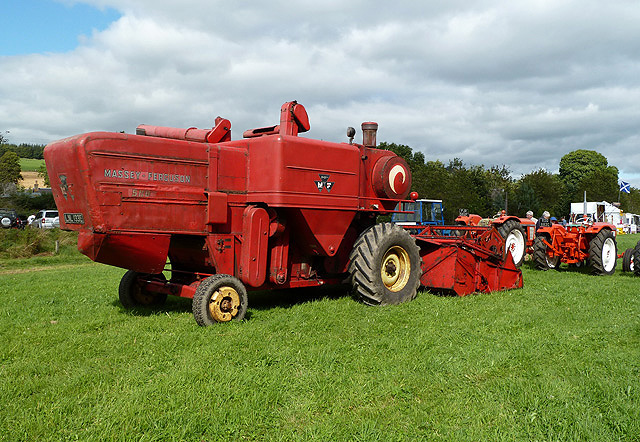
Massey Ferguson Model 560 Combine Harvester

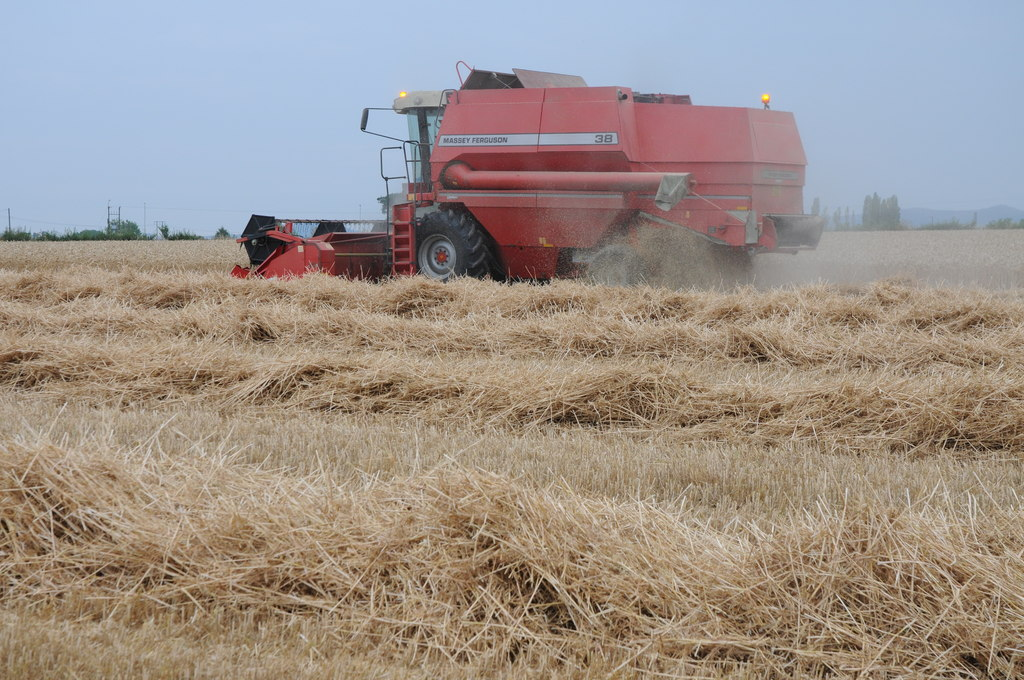
Massey Ferguson Model 38 Combine Harvester in UK

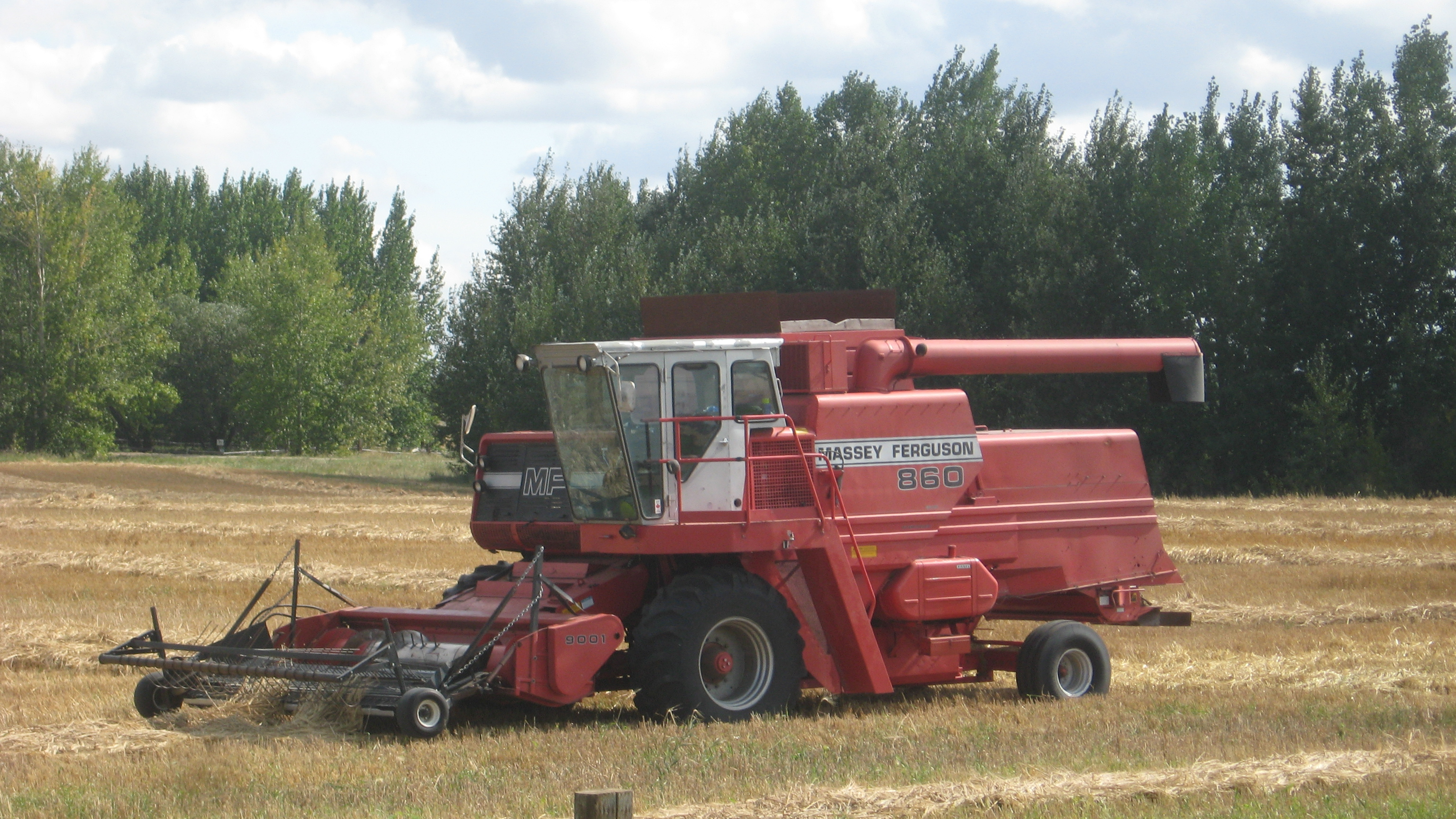
Massey Ferguson 860 Combine

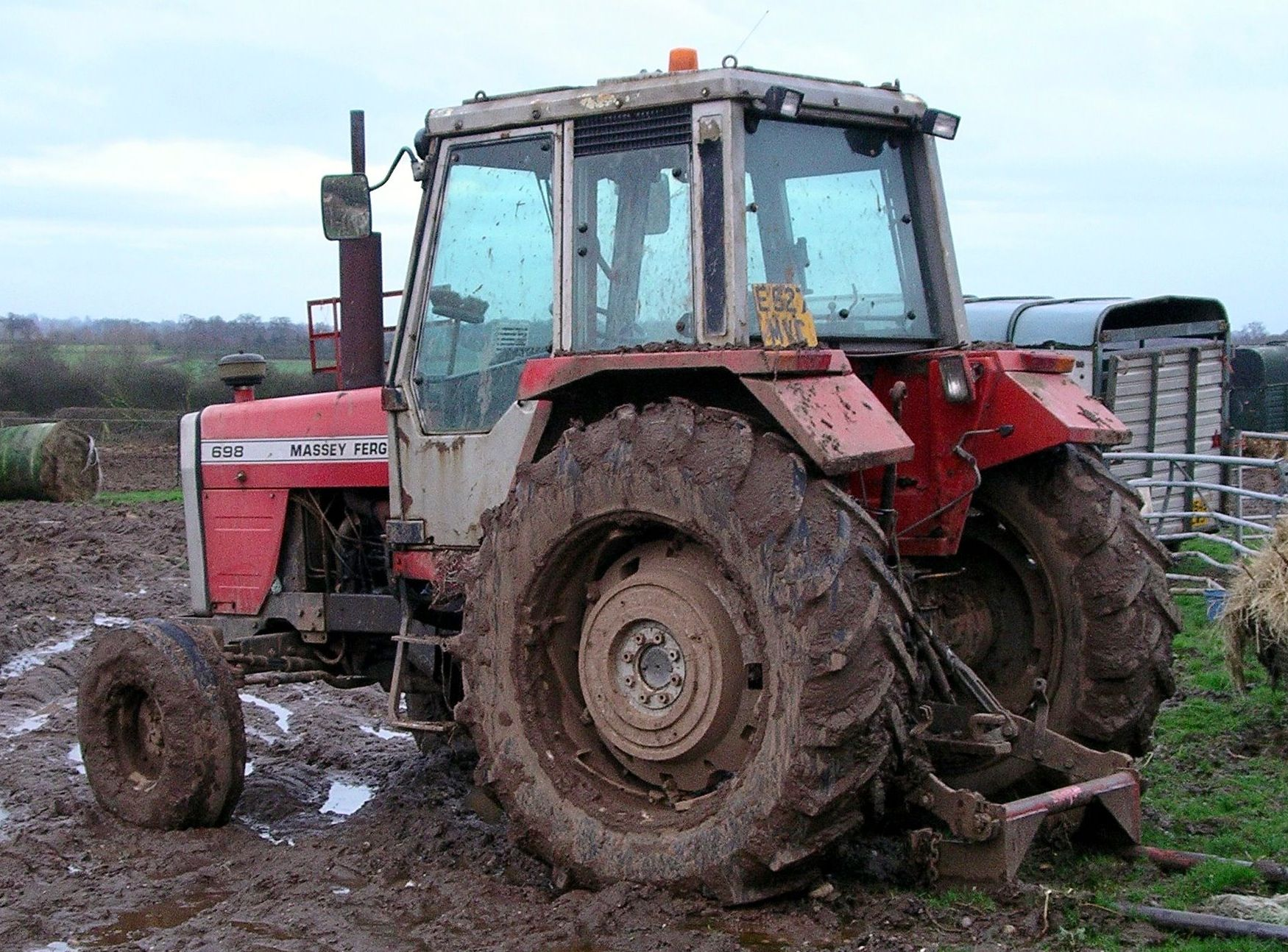
Massey Ferguson MF 698

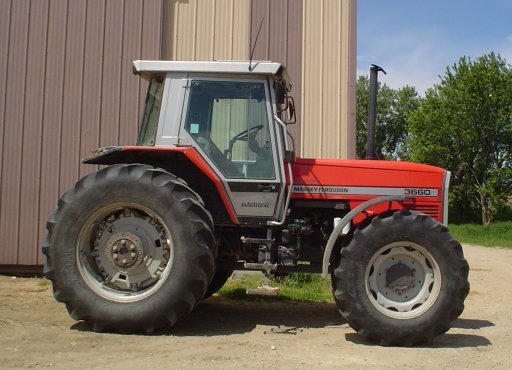
Massey Ferguson MF 3660

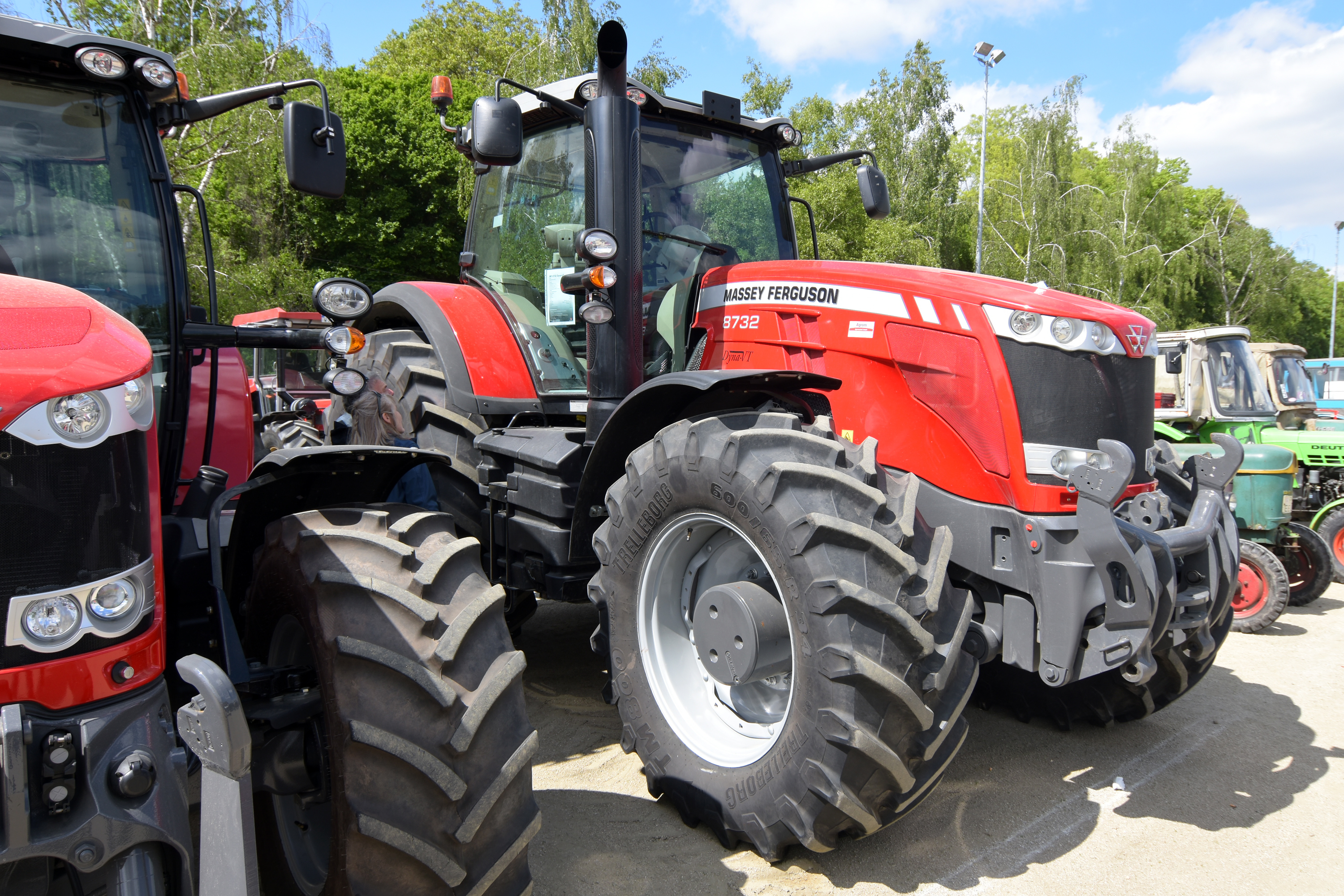
Massey Ferguson MF 8732

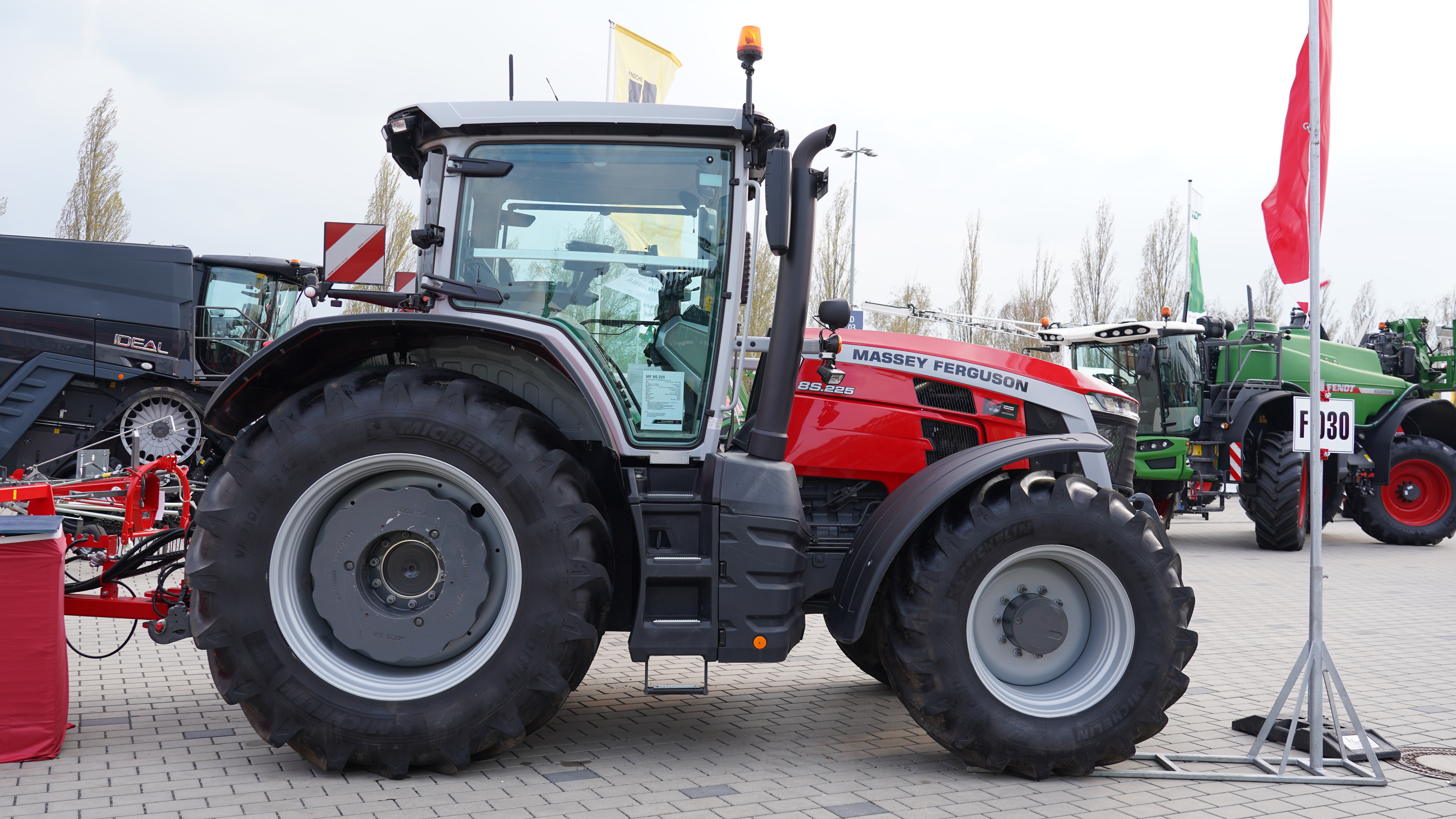
Massey Ferguson 8S.225

== Former logos ==
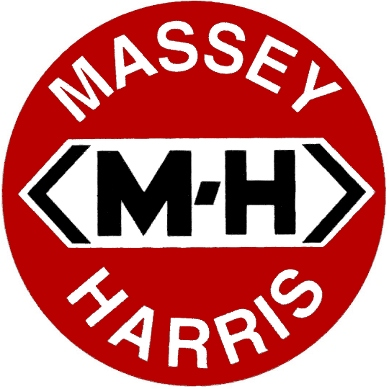
In use 1890–1958

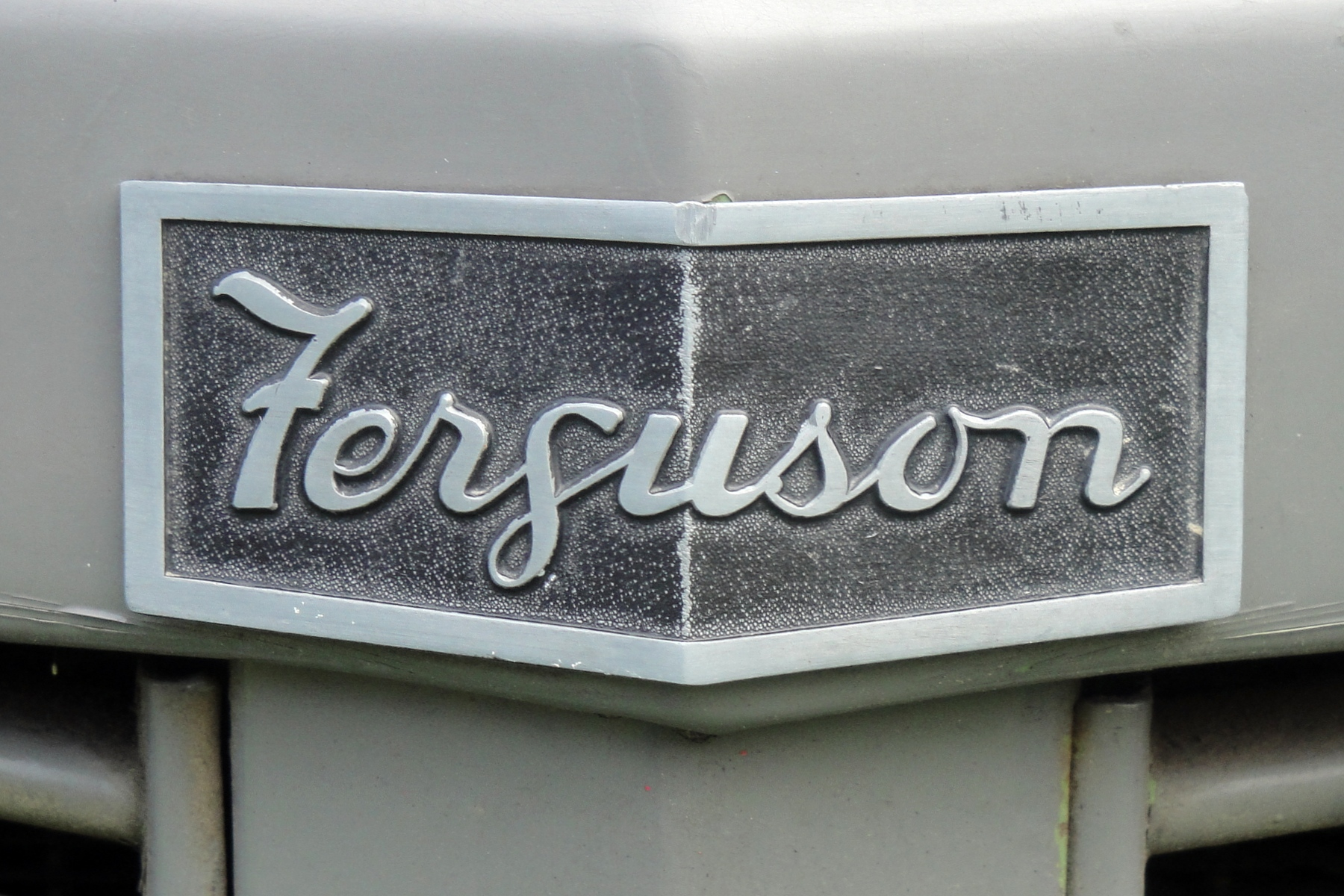
In use 1946–1951

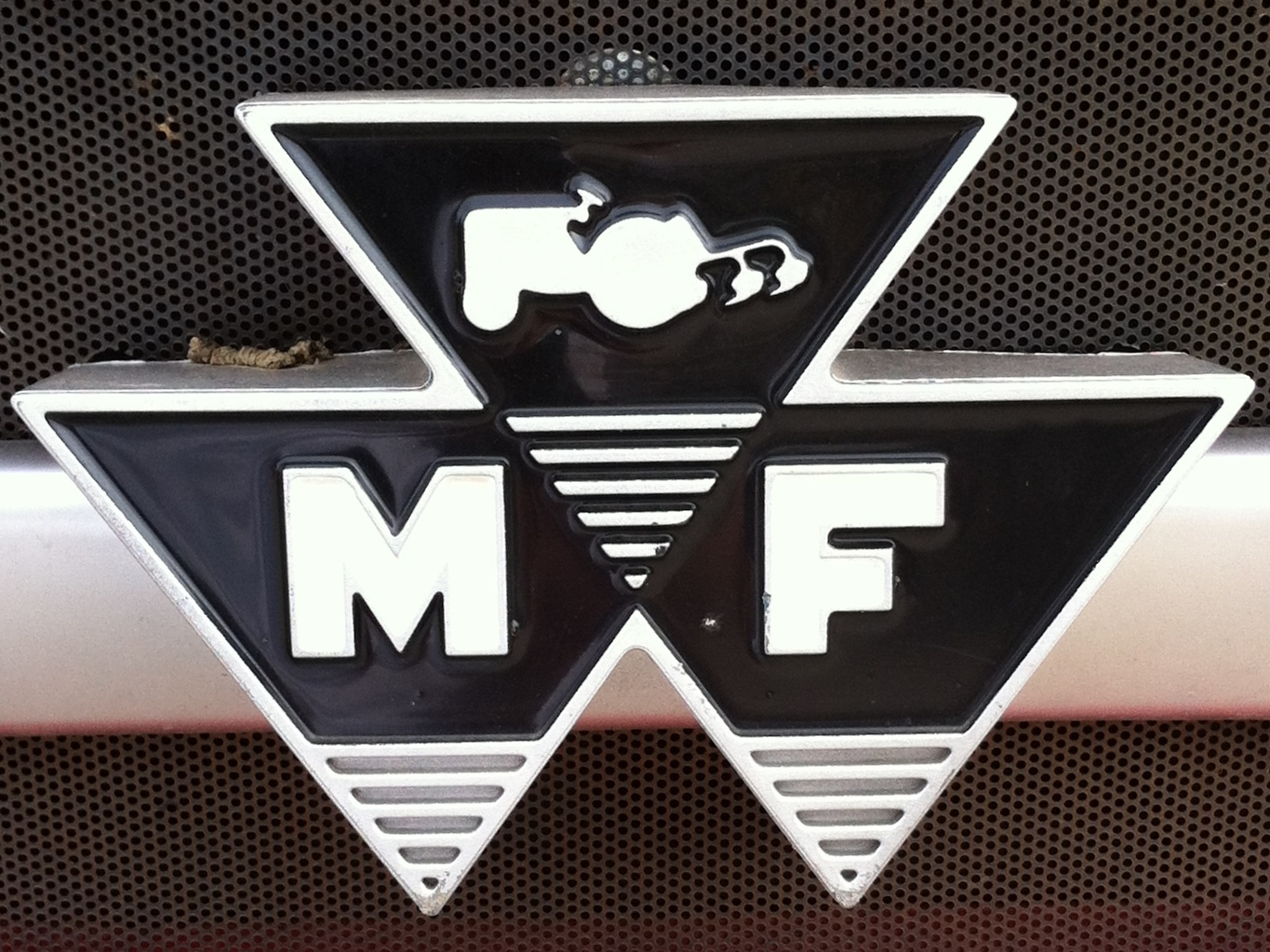
In use 1958–1970

In use 2002–2021

Massey Ferguson is the most widely sold brand of agricultural machinery in the world. The brand designs were licensed to a variety of companies including:

- Algerian Tractors Company — Licensee in Algeria
- Industry of Machinery and Tractors — Licensee in Serbia
- Millat Tractors — Licensee in Pakistan
- Tractors and Farm Equipment Limited (TAFE) — Licensee in India

== See also ==
- Dynashift
- Liberty Village — area where Massey Ferguson had a plant is now a residential neighbourhood with the company's head office building at 915 King Street West still standing (by E. J. Lennox, George M. Miller, c. 1885-1914) as Massey Harris Lofts.
- Abbey Machinery

== Sources ==
- Pripps, Robert N. The Big Book of Farm Tractors. Vancouver, B.C.: Raincoast Books, 2001. ISBN 978-1-55192-393-2.
- Newman, Peter C. (1982). The Establishment Man: Conrad Black, A Portrait of Power. McClelland and Stewart. ISBN 0-7710-6786-0.
