= Massey Ferguson MF Centora =

The Massey Ferguson MF Centora is a series of models of combine harvesters made in America by Massey Ferguson.

== MF Centora 7280 ==
The 7280 is the first in the series the header span is 6.2 meters. It is the smallest at 378 horsepower, it has a 3500-liter tank.

== MF Centora 7280 Al ==
The 7280 Al is almost the same as the MF Centora 7280. Apart from it has a slightly longer header.

== MF centora7282 ==
This model has 10500 liter tank it has a longer header at 7m 7 cm.

== MF Centora 7282 AL ==
This Combine is almost the same as the 7282 but it has a tank the size of 9500 liters it is improved electronically.
