= Massey Harris Lofts =

Heritage building in Toronto, Canada

Coordinates: 43.641540°N 79.412939°W

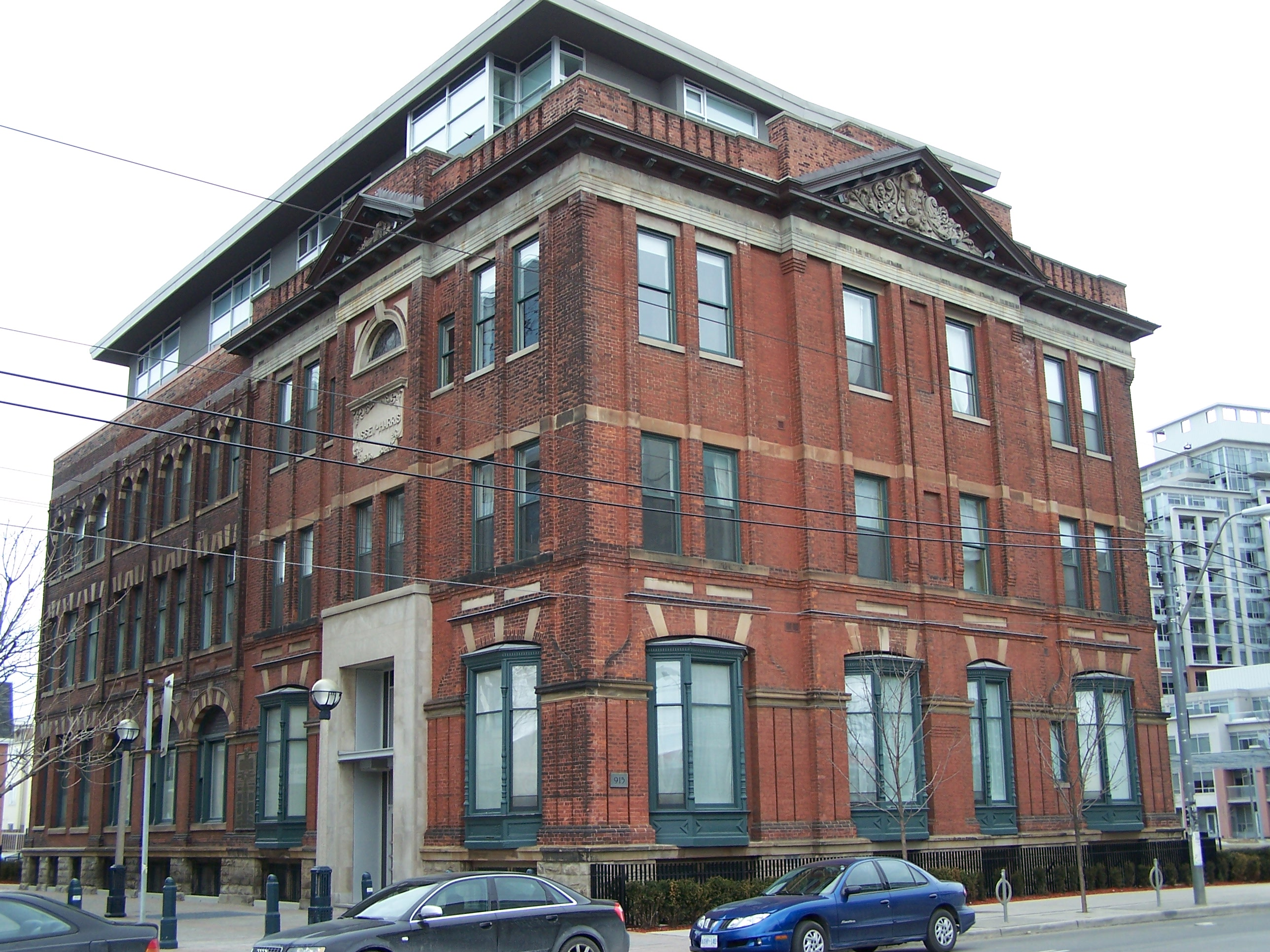
- Interactive map of the Massey Harris Lofts area

General information
- Architectural style: Richardsonian Romanesque
- Location: 915 King St W, Toronto, Ontario, Canada
- Completed: 1885; 1899 (3rd flr); prior to 1914 (rear wing)
- Renovated: 2003

Technical details
- Floor count: 4

Design and construction
- Architects: E.J. Lennox; George M. Miller (south addition)

The Massey Harris Lofts is a loft condominium in the Liberty Village area of downtown Toronto, Ontario, Canada. The building is the former head office of Massey-Harris Limited, later known as Massey Ferguson, a large agricultural implements manufacturer. It is the last building remaining from a large factory complex that Massey-Harris operated on King Street West from the 1870s until the 1980s.

== History ==
According to the City of Toronto records, the original building was a two-storey building along King Street built in 1885. A third floor was added in 1899 and a three-storey wing was added to the south side of the building before World War I. The north section was designed by well known Toronto architect E.J. Lennox and the south addition by George M. Miller. The Richardsonian Romanesque building served as the head office for Massey Manufacturing, later Massey-Harris (formed in 1891 from the merger of Massey Manufacturing Company of Toronto and Alanson Harris, Son and Company Limited of Brantford and lastly Massey Ferguson), part of a large 4.4 hectares (11 acres) complex. It is located at 915 King Street West.

By the late 1970s, the head office building had become vacant, as the company used office space downtown. The surrounding manufacturing complex, which at one time employed 9,000} workers, began scaling down its operations, moving manufacturing to Brantford, Ontario leaving only a small-scale operation. After closing the plant completely in October 1982, Massey Ferguson started making plans for a mixed-use development of its manufacturing lands. The head office building was to have a community space on the first floor, with residences above. The Massey Harris lands were rezoned to permit a new "high-tech zone" south of King, and residences to the north. After rezoning, the remaining complex was sold in 1988 to Counsel Property Corp for CA$52 million. However, by 1990, the real estate market crashed and ownership reverted to the mortgage holder, Canadian Imperial Bank of Commerce (CIBC), which planned to build a data centre on the lands.

CIBC cancelled its plans for a data centre on the property, leaving the redevelopment stalled. The terms of the rezoning agreements were revised, dropping the high tech zone, permitting the head office building to become fully residential. Residential uses were now permitted on all of the former industrial lands. Beginning in 2003, the head office structure was converted to residential use of 46 units, adding a fourth floor. The other M-F buildings, including the plant, were demolished. In 2008, the building was designated as a heritage building under the Ontario Heritage Act.

The 1 acre (0.40 ha) Massey Harris Park is located west of the building.
