= Massey-Harris Model 20 =

Tractor

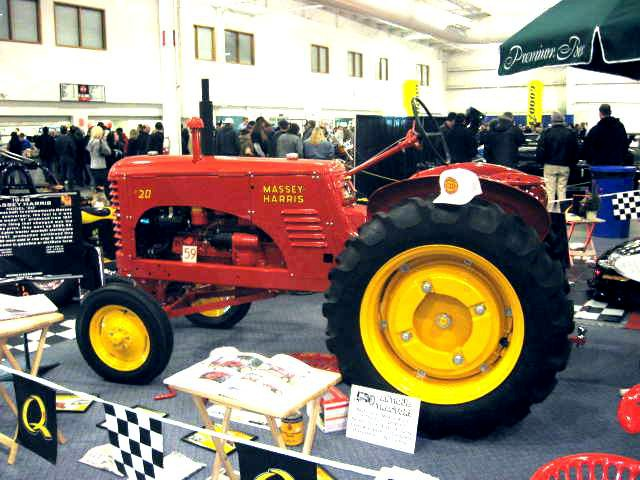
A standard-tread 1948 Massey-Harris 20.

The Massey-Harris Model 20 was a two-plow type of tractor built by Massey-Harris (later Massey Ferguson) from 1946 to 1948. Introduced to commemorate Massey's 100th anniversary in 1947, the 20 was virtually identical to the earlier Model 81, which had first appeared in 1941. About 8,000 Model 20s were sold, in row crop or standard models, with the choice of gasoline or kerosene (known as tractor vaporising oil, or TVO, in Britain) as fuel. The Model 20 was replaced in 1948 by the Model 22.

== Pricing ==
With a base price of around C$1450, about C$500 more than the 81, the 20 was competitive with Ford and Ferguson-Brown models of the period.

== Weight ==
The bare weight without ballast was 3,000 lb (1,400 kg) – 700 lb (320 kg) less than the contemporary Model 30, which significantly outsold it, but about 400 lb (180 kg)) more than the earlier 81.

== Engine ==
The 124 in^{3} (2,031 cc) engine inherited from the 81, and the 101 before it, produced 31 hp (23 kW) at the belt, and was manufactured by Continental, like all Massey Harris tractors at the time.

== Transmission ==
The 20 offered four speeds (against the 30's five), providing a top speed of 2.5 mph (4 km/h) in first (low) and 13.5 mph (21.6 km/h) in fourth (high).

== Sources ==
- Pripps, Robert N. (2001). The big book of Massey tractors. Vancouver: Raincoast Books. ISBN 1-55192-423-4. OCLC 46991918.
