= Dynashift =

Tractor gearbox

Dynashift is a type of gearbox on many Massey Ferguson tractors. In May 2006 Tier 3 Compliant gearboxes were released, and the production of Dynashift halted.
