= Massey-Harris Model 81 =

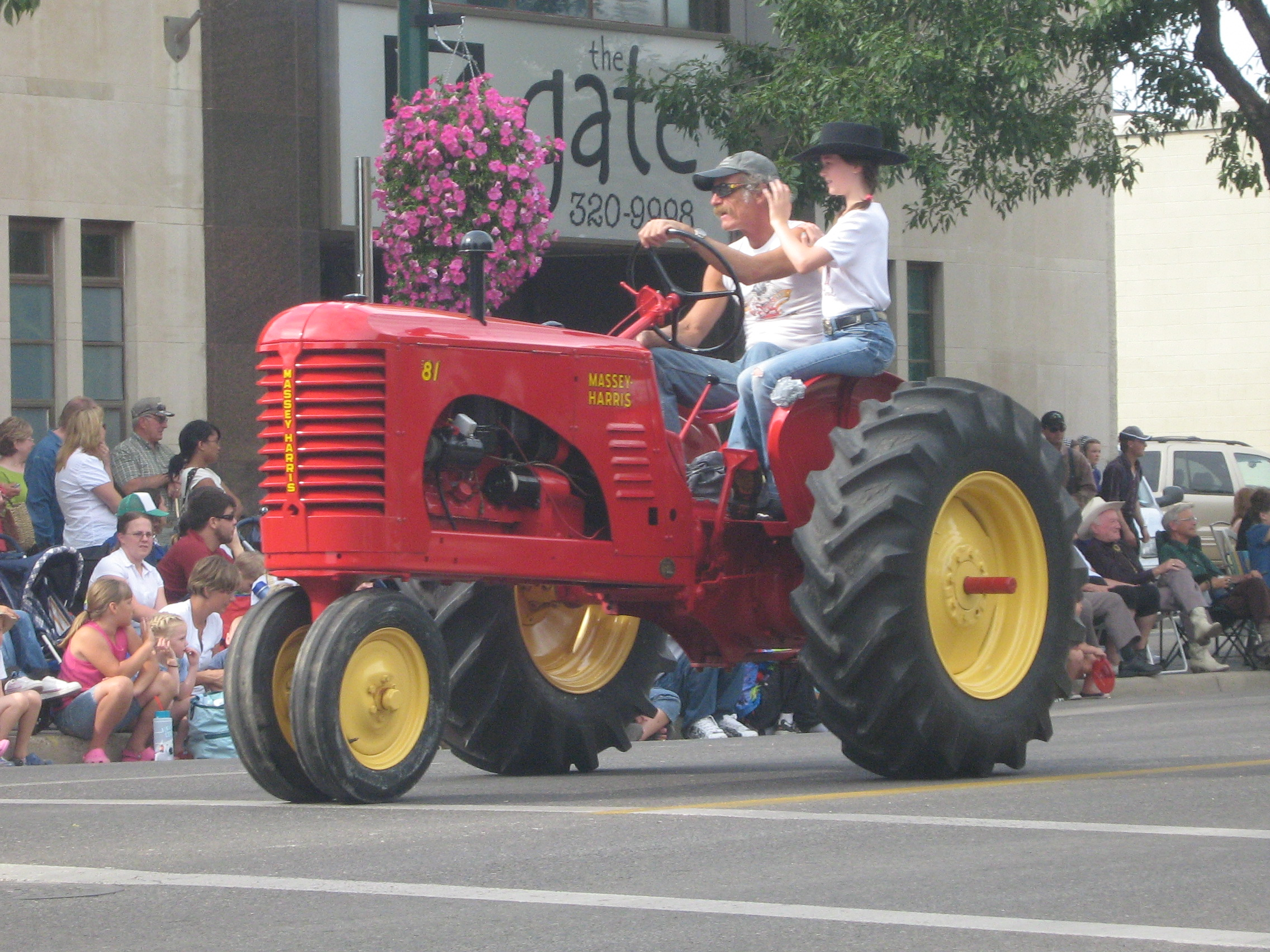
- Type: agricultural
- Manufacturer: Massey-Harris
- Production: 1941-1948
- Length: 119 inches
- Height: 58 inches
- Weight: 2,895 lbs.
- Propulsion: wheels

The Massey-Harris Model 81 was a two-plow small-farm tractor built by Massey-Harris (later Massey Ferguson) from 1941 to 1948. Introduced to replace Massey's General GG, the 81 was paired with the Model 82 (which used kerosene, or tractor vaporizing oil {TVO}, as it was known in Britain) and was very similar to the Model 101 Junior, which first appeared in 1939. It was offered in standard-tread and row-crop versions, as was the Model 20 that followed it. The Model 81 was joined in 1946 by the Model 20, both of which survived in production until 1948.

== Pricing ==
With a base price of around C$800, it was competitive with the C$900 John Deere A. and less than Ford and Ferguson-Brown models of the period.

== Weight ==
The bare weight without ballast was 2,600 lb (1,170 kg), some 1,100 lb {580 kg} less than the contemporary Model 30.

== Engines ==
The 81 used the same 124 in^{3} (2,031 cc) engine of the 101 Junior, while the 82 used a 140 in^{3} (2,293 cc) model. The 124 in^{3} was rated at 21 hp (15.7 kW) at the belt, and was manufactured by Continental, like all Massey-Harris tractors at the time.

== Use by Royal Canadian Air Force ==
The Royal Canadian Air Force used blue-painted standards as aircraft tugs, out of under 2,600 standard-tread 81s made.

== Sources ==
- Pripps, Robert N. (2001). The big book of Massey tractors. Vancouver: Raincoast Books. ISBN 1-55192-423-4. OCLC 46991918.
