= Beard Building =

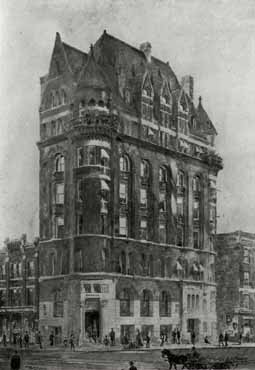
- Interactive map of the Beard Building area

General information
- Status: Demolished
- Type: Commercial offices Hotel
- Architectural style: Romanesque Revival
- Location: 163 King Street East; Toronto, Ontario, Canada
- Coordinates: 43.650366°N 79.371587°W
- Completed: 1893 – 1894
- Demolished: 1935
- Cost: $60,000

Height
- Roof: 25.8 m (85 ft)

Technical details
- Floor count: 7; 1 below ground

Design and construction
- Architect: E. J. Lennox

The Beard Building was a seven-storey, 25.38 m (83.3 ft) Richardsonian Romanesque highrise in Toronto, Ontario, Canada that is considered to be Toronto's first skyscraper. Designed by E. J. Lennox and completed in 1894, initial plans were for a nine-storey, iron-framed structure, but a more traditional wood-brick combination with seven storeys was settled upon.

The Beard Building consisted of a bank at street level, a commercial and office tower, and a hotel. A branch of The Bank of Commerce occupied the building's main space on its ground floor. Above that, the hotel never opened because of the design of the building. However, the space above the ground floor was leased to businesses as office space. The building was named after George T. Beard, the original landowner of the site.

The Beard Building was demolished in 1935 and was replaced by a gas station a few years later.
