= Massey-Harris Model 101 =

Type of tractor

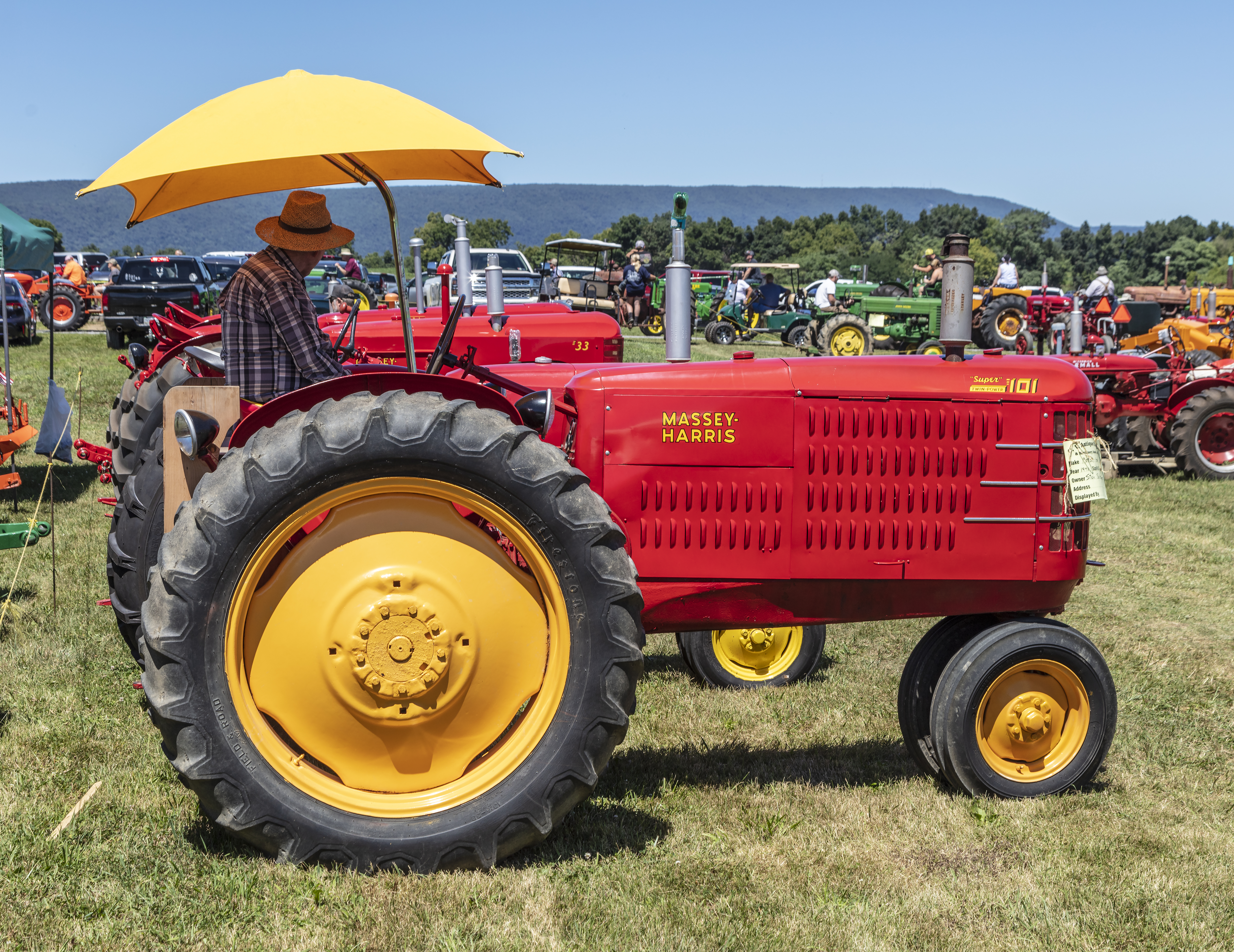
Massey-Harris Super 101 with louvered side cowling

The Massey-Harris Model 101 was a tractor built by Massey-Harris (later Massey Ferguson) from 1938 to 1946. Developed under the guidance of James S. Duncan, who gambled corporate losses would drop and won, the 101 introduced the Chrysler L-head inline six. The six would compete with Oliver's straight-six Model 70, while saving money on development of a whole new engine as well as taking advantage of Chrysler's existing parts and service network.

== Specification ==
The 101 used the 201 in³ (3,292 cc) six, taking advantage of its stock electric start, a first in a tractor. Run at much lower revs than the truck engine, the 101 came in the usual standard and row-crop models, with four-speed transmission, and was capable of 20 mph (32 km/h) on roads. The row-crop model offered adjustable rear wheel spacing and rear wheel brakes, as well as PTO. There was also a rare model with a single front wheel. They also featured hood sides with dozens of louvers, which disappeared late in 1941. The Super was upgraded to the 217 in³ (3,554 cc) Chrysler in 1940, giving it almost 50 hp (37 kW) at the belt, making it one of the most powerful tractors on the market that year. It continued to be used in the 101 Super until 1940, when it was supplanted by the 217 in³ (3,554 cc).

== Pricing ==
With a base price of around C$1100, the 101 was about C$200 more than the John Deere A. and competitive with Ford and Ferguson-Brown models of the period. Yet the top-selling tractors were all lighter and much cheaper.

== Model 101 Junior ==
To address this, the Model 101 was joined in 1939 by the "entry level" two-plow Model 101 Junior with Continental's inline four, while the six-cylinder model became the 101 Super. The Junior, comparable to the Deere Model H, used the same 124 in³ (2,031 cc) engine of the later 81 and 20, and produced 31 hp (23 kW) at the belt, Manufactured by Continental, it was used in many Massey Harris tractors at the time, as well as by the Cockshutt 20 and Oliver Super 44. The comparable kerosene (tractor vaporising oil, or TVO, in Britain) version was known as the 102 Junior. In 1940, the 124 in³ engine was replaced by a 140 in³ (2,293 cc) Continental of 19 drawbar/23 belt hp (14/17 kW) and in 1943 with a 162 in³ (2,654 cc) version.

== Production ==
While the C$895 Junior sold nearly 28,000 units by 1946, it could not match the 60,000 each of the Deere H and Allis-Chalmers B, 180,000 of the Farmall A, and was barely a fraction of Ford's 260,000 9Ns. The Model 101 Super ended production in 1942. The 101 Junior persisted until 1946, while the waning sales of the 102 Junior saw the name pass to overseas sales.

== Sources ==
- Pripps, Robert N. (2001). The big book of Massey tractors. Vancouver: Raincoast Books. ISBN 1-55192-423-4. OCLC 46991918.
