= Abbey Machinery =

Irish agricultural machinery manufacturer

- Type: Privately held
- Founded: 1947
- Founder: Joseph Cavanagh; Mary Cavanagh
- Headquarters: Nenagh, County Tipperary, Ireland
- Area served: Ireland, UK, Australia, New Zealand, Iceland
- Key people: Clodagh Cavanagh (Managing Director)

Abbey Machinery is an Irish agricultural machinery manufacturer. It is known for its characteristic orange-colored machines. It is Ireland's "longest established manufacturer of agricultural machinery", and specialises in cattle feeding and slurry management equipment. Abbey manufactures agricultural equipment for local and international markets including diet feeders, precision toppers, fertilizer spreaders, slurry tankers, muck spreaders, and slurry agitators.

Abbey Machinery was founded by Mary and Joseph Cavanagh in 1947. The Cavanagh family had been blacksmiths operating a local foundry business in Abbey Lane, Nenagh since the late 1800s. After spending some time in the United States, Joseph Cavanagh returned to Ireland in 1946, and formed Abbey Machinery in 1947 with his wife Mary.
