= Building at 399 West Fullerton Parkway =

Apartment building in Chicago, Illinois

- U.S. National Register of Historic Places
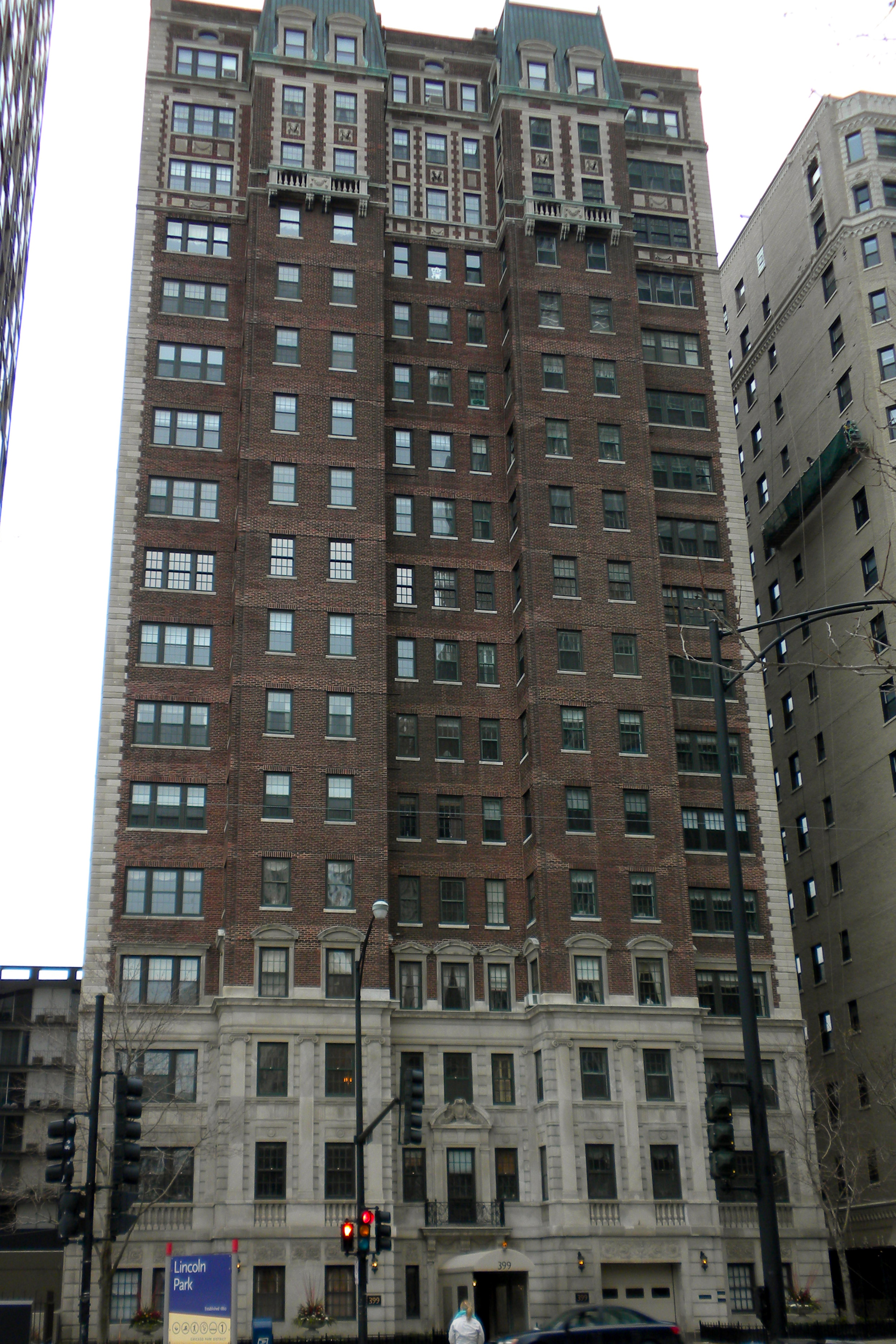

- Location within Chicago metropolitan area Location within Illinois Location within the United States
- Location: 399 W. Fullerton Parkway, Chicago, Illinois
- Coordinates: 41°55′31″N 87°38′21″W
- Area: 0.3 acres (0.12 ha)
- Built: 1926; 100 years ago
- Architect: McNally & Quinn
- Architectural style: French Renaissance Revival
- NRHP reference No.: 07000456
- Added to NRHP: May 22, 2007

The Building at 399 West Fullerton Parkway is a historic apartment building at 399 West Fullerton Parkway in the Lincoln Park neighborhood of Chicago, Illinois. Built in 1926, the seventeen-story building was developed and marketed as luxury cooperative apartments for Chicago's affluent residents. Cooperative apartments, in which residents were part owners of the building and controlled its management and who could buy units, became popular with Chicago's upper class in the 1920s due in part to successful marketing by developers. The apartments at 399 West Fullerton offered an attractive location with lakeside views and modern amenities, including parking space and chauffeur service for the increasingly popular automobile. Architects McNally and Quinn designed the French Renaissance Revival building; their design includes a brick exterior with classically ornamented stone on the first three stories, decorative balustrades and window surrounds on the upper floors, and two small, steep hip roofs atop the projected sections of the facade.

The building was added to the National Register of Historic Places on May 22, 2007.
