= Massey Ferguson 399 =

Tractor

The Massey Ferguson 399 was the most powerful tractor in the 300 series range built at Massey Ferguson's Banner Lane, Coventry, UK factory. The tractor was released globally in 1986.

== Appearance ==
It was first introduced with a black cab that was similar to that of its predecessor range, the 600 series Massey Ferguson. Its brilliant red appearance stood out when the state of the art "Hi-line" silver cab was introduced in 1988.

== Engine ==
The 399 was initially powered by a 97 horsepower Perkins A6.354 6-cylinder diesel engine as standard. The engine was uprated to a 104 hp 1006 series engine and the cab updated in 1991. The company never had such bumper sales with a series of tractor since it first started decades previously. The years 1994–96 were good for Massey Ferguson when Ireland and the UK had record sales of this series. The main reasons for this was its reliability, excellent cab, strong features and powerful engine the latter sometimes receiving dealer fitted turbocharger kits to boost the 399's power to the 100/105 horsepower mark, giving the farmer a lightweight, yet powerful tractor for field work where a larger tractor might damage the crop.

== Transmission ==
At the start of production the 399 was available with a 12 fwd 4 rev synchromesh gearbox until 1991 when a 12 fwd 12 rev shuttle gearbox was introduced. In 1994 an 18 fwd 6 rev speedshift gearbox was introduced, which was similar to multi-power gearbox fitted in the earlier Massey Ferguson tractors, both the latter two gearboxes were fitted until the end of production and were available as 45km/h speed versions and when revved it can reach speeds of 48 km/h.

== Equipment ==
In the United Kingdom and Ireland, the Speedshift tractors were offered with front fenders, flashing amber beacon and rear wash wipe as standard equipment in two-wheel-drive form or four-wheel-drive form, the latter being the bigger seller of the two. The tractor remained in production until 1997, when the 4200 series was launched and the 399 was replaced by the 4270.
