= USS YP-399 =

History
- Name: YP-399 (ex-Big Dipper)
- Builder: Peterson Boat Building, Tacoma
- Sponsored by: John Brescovich
- Completed: 1942
- Acquired: acquired by the U.S. Navy, 29 May 1942
- Honors and awards: American Campaign Medal; World War II Victory Medal
- Fate: unknown
- Notes: Call sign: NZOO

General characteristics
- Type: Patrol boat
- Displacement: 115 long tons (117 t)
- Length: 85 ft (26 m) o/a
- Beam: 24 ft (7.3 m)
- Installed power: 300 shp
- Propulsion: Diesel, 1 × screw

USS YP-399 was a fishing vessel acquired by the U.S. Navy before completion during World War II to serve as a patrol boat.

== History ==
She was completed in 1942 at the Tacoma shipyard of the Peterson Boat Building for the benefit of John Brescovich and named Big Dipper. On 29 May 1942, she was acquired by the U.S. Navy. She was designated as a Yard Patrol Craft (YP) and assigned to the 13th Naval District. Her commanding officer was Lieutenant Commandeer Vernon Johnson. She was one of the initial ships assembled by Captain Ralph C. Parker for the Alaskan Sector, Northwest Sea Frontier, 13th Naval District colloquially known as the "Alaskan Navy".

On 8 May 1946, she was struck from the Naval List and transferred to the United States Maritime Administration who returned her to her original owner. She served as a commercial fishing vessel thereafter for a number of owners under the names Big Dipper (until 1951), FV Liberty Bell II (until 1967), and FV Nautilus. She went out of registration in 1997.
