= E. J. Lennox =

Canadian architect (1854–1933)

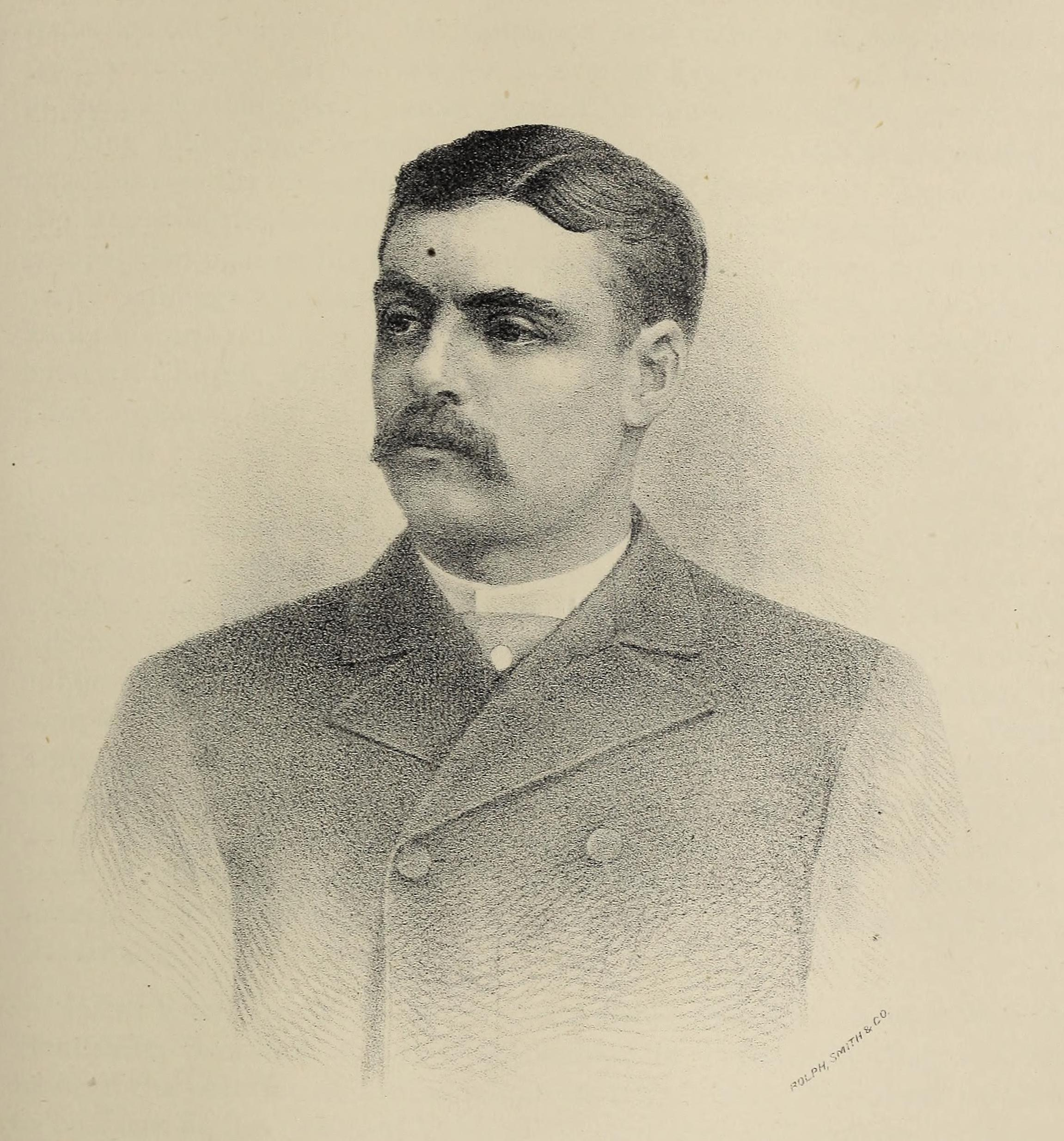
- 1885 portrait
- Born: Edward James Lennox; September 12, 1854; Toronto, Ontario, Canada
- Died: April 15, 1933 (aged 78); Toronto, Ontario, Canada
- Occupation: Architect
- Spouse: Emiline Wilson (m. 1881)
- Children: Eola Gertrude; Edgar Edward; Mabel Emeline; Edith May

Edward James Lennox (September 12, 1854 – April 15, 1933) was a Toronto-based architect who designed several of the city's most notable landmarks in the late nineteenth and early twentieth centuries, including Old City Hall and Casa Loma. He designed over 70 buildings in the city of Toronto.

== Life and career ==
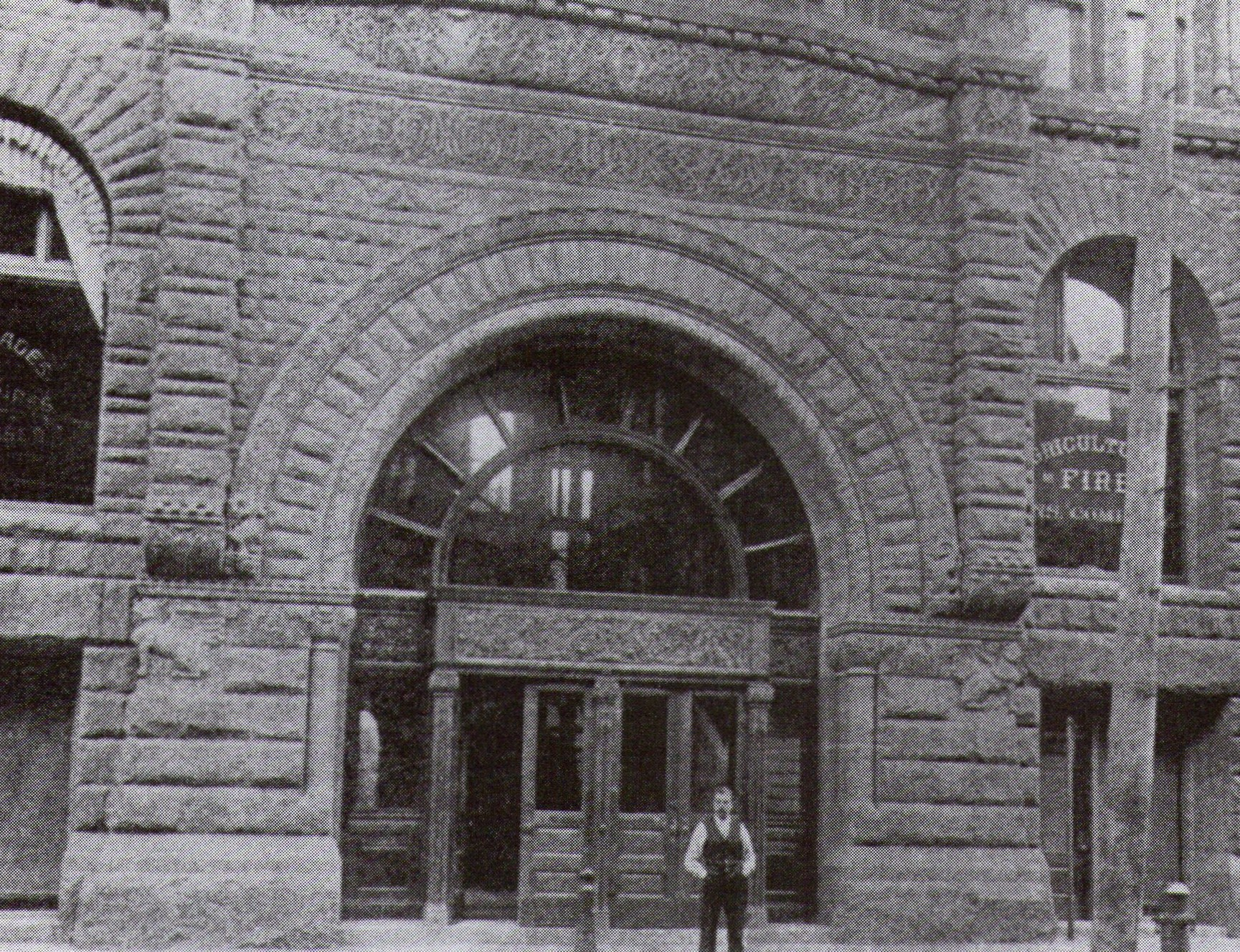
Lennox standing in front of one of his buildings, the Freehold Loan Building, at Adelaide and Victoria Streets

The son of Irish immigrants, he studied at the Mechanics' Institute in Toronto, where he finished first in his class. Upon graduation in 1874, he apprenticed with architect William Irving for five years. He then formed a partnership with fellow architect William Frederick McCaw, before forming his own firm in 1881.

He quickly became one of the most successful architects in Toronto. He rose to the top of his profession when he won the contract for Toronto City Hall in 1886. His caricature can be seen carved in stone on the facade of Old City Hall—he's the one with the handlebar moustache.

Many of his buildings were designed in the Richardsonian Romanesque style, and he was one of the most important figures in bringing that style to Toronto. His creative prowess in the Romanesque Revival style was especially important in The Annex neighbourhood, where Lennox designed the Lewis Lukes House at 37 Madison Avenue in the mid-1880s, pioneering the Annex House. This style of house is indigenous to Toronto, and it blends elements of Romanesque with that of Queen Anne style.

Later in his life, he served as commissioner of the Toronto Transit Commission from 1923 to 1929.

== Buildings ==
Building	Location	Dates	Notes	Image
Hanlan's Hotel	Toronto Islands	1875	Queen Anne; demolished	
Twenty Plenty outlet	150 Main Street, Unionville, Ontario	1879	Queen Anne; built as Unionville Congregational Church and sold to Presbyterian Church 1894 and sold again 1925; later used as veterans hall 1949–1998, home to Home Aid Society and retail store.	
Bond Street Congregational Church	Dundas Street and Bond Street (northeast corner)	1879	Gothic Revival; destroyed 1981 (fire, then demolished)	
Berwick Hall	139 Main Street South, Georgetown	1882	Victorian; home of local businessman John R. Barber from 1880 to 1904, then an apartment building	
Massey Manufacturing Company Office Building	710 King Street West and 519 King Street West	1883	Richardsonian Romanesque; 710 demolished, with 519 now as 511 King Street West (offices and retail tenants)	
Lewis Lukes House	37 Madison Avenue, The Annex	1886	Richardsonian Romanesque; converted to office space (Maverick Public Relations Inc.)	
Milburn building	47-55 Colborne Street	1886	Richardsonian Romanesque; lower floor restaurants and upper floor offices	
Mausoleum of Hart Massey	Mount Pleasant Cemetery, Toronto	1892	Richardsonian Romanesque	
Toronto Athletic Club	149 College Street at University Avenue, Toronto	1894	Richardsonian Romanesque; now Rotman School, University of Toronto	
Beard Building	King Street East and Jarvis Street, Toronto	1894	Richardsonian Romanesque; considered the city's first skyscraper; demolished in the 1930s	
Georgetown High School	Georgetown, Ontario	1899	Demolished 1959 and replaced with current building 1960 (now Georgetown District High School)	
Freehold Loan Building	Adelaide Street East at Victoria Street, Toronto	1890	Demolished 1960s; became 20 Adelaide Street East c. 1988	
Broadway Methodist Tabernacle	College Street and Spadina Avenue, Toronto	1899	Richardsonian Romanesque; demolished c. 1930	
Old City Hall	Queen Street West and Bay Street, Toronto	1899	Richardsonian Romanesque; now provincial court house	
Massey Harris Head Office	915 King Street West, Toronto	1899	Richardsonian Romanesque; now Massey Harris Lofts	
King Edward Hotel	King Street East and Jarvis Street, Toronto	1903	Chicago School; designed with Henry Ives Cobb for George Gooderham's Toronto Hotel Company	
Toronto-Bridgman Transformer Station	391 Davenport Road	1904	Toronto Hydro Transformer Station	
Bank of Toronto	Yonge Street and Queen Street	1905	Neo-Classical	
Toronto Power Generating Station	Niagara Falls, Ontario	1906	Beaux-Arts	
West Wing of the Ontario Legislative Building at Queen's Park	Queen's Park Crescent, Toronto	1909	Edwardian Neo-Classical to interior and additional floor on West Wing	Queen's Park with 1909 west wing renovation
Casa Loma	1 Austin Terrace, Toronto	1911	Gothic Revival	
St. Paul's Anglican Church	227 Bloor Street East	1913	Gothic Revival	
Postal Station G	765 Queen Street East, South Riverdale, Toronto	1913	Neo-Classical; Queen/Saulter Library 1980, today the Ralph Thornton Community Centre	
Lenwil	5 Austin Terrace	1913	Tudor Revival; built by Lennox as his own residence, and today is the provincial home of the Sisters Servants of Mary Immaculate	
Excelsior Life Insurance Company Building	36 Toronto Street	1914	Beaux-Arts; currently used as office and commercial space	
Wolseley Motor Car Company	77 Avenue Road	1914	Richardsonian Romanesque; demolished 1976 and now part of Hazelton Lanes complex	
Toronto Western Hospital	399 Bathurst Street	1906	Neo-Renaissance; 1906 (North Wing), 1910 (South Wing), 1911 and 1923 (additions ) Demolished 1950s-1992; now parking lot	
Residence for James B. Boustead	134 Bloor Street East	1891	Tudor Revival; built for James Bellingham Boustead, Toronto entrepreneur and Toronto alderman 1865–1897; demolished mid-20th century and near the site of the Manulife Insurance Building	
Hagerman Public School / School Section # 8	4121 Fourteenth Avenue, Markham, Ontario	1888	Richardsonian Romanesque school house is believed to be designed by Lennox. Now used as The School Fine Dining.	
New Toronto Hydro Sub Station	124 Birmingham Street, New Toronto	1917	Edwardian Revival building awaiting historic designation; Now abandoned and awaiting re-development pending sale by city's CreateTO.	
Chateau des Quatre Vents	3025 Queen Street East, Toronto	1892	Queen Anne style architecture mansion built in 1892 for William T. Murray on land purchased from Sir Henry Pellatt, who is best-known for having commissioned Lennox to build Casa Loma.	

== Legacy ==
A small residential street called E.J. Lennox Way is named for him in Unionville, Ontario, behind the former Unionville Congregational Church.

His son Edgar Edward Lennox was also an architect, as well as brother Charles David Lennox, who worked with E. J. Lennox from 1887 to 1915.

Susan M. Lennox great grand daughter of Charles David Lennox and great great niece of E. J. Lennox also an Architect. Graduate of University of Toronto 1992 Bachelor of Architecture. Co-Founder of Lennox Architects Limited Huntsville Ontario with Susana Marques.

== External ==
- Media related to E.J. Lennox at Wikimedia Commons
- E. J. Lennox fonds, Archives of Ontario
