= Ford NAA tractor =

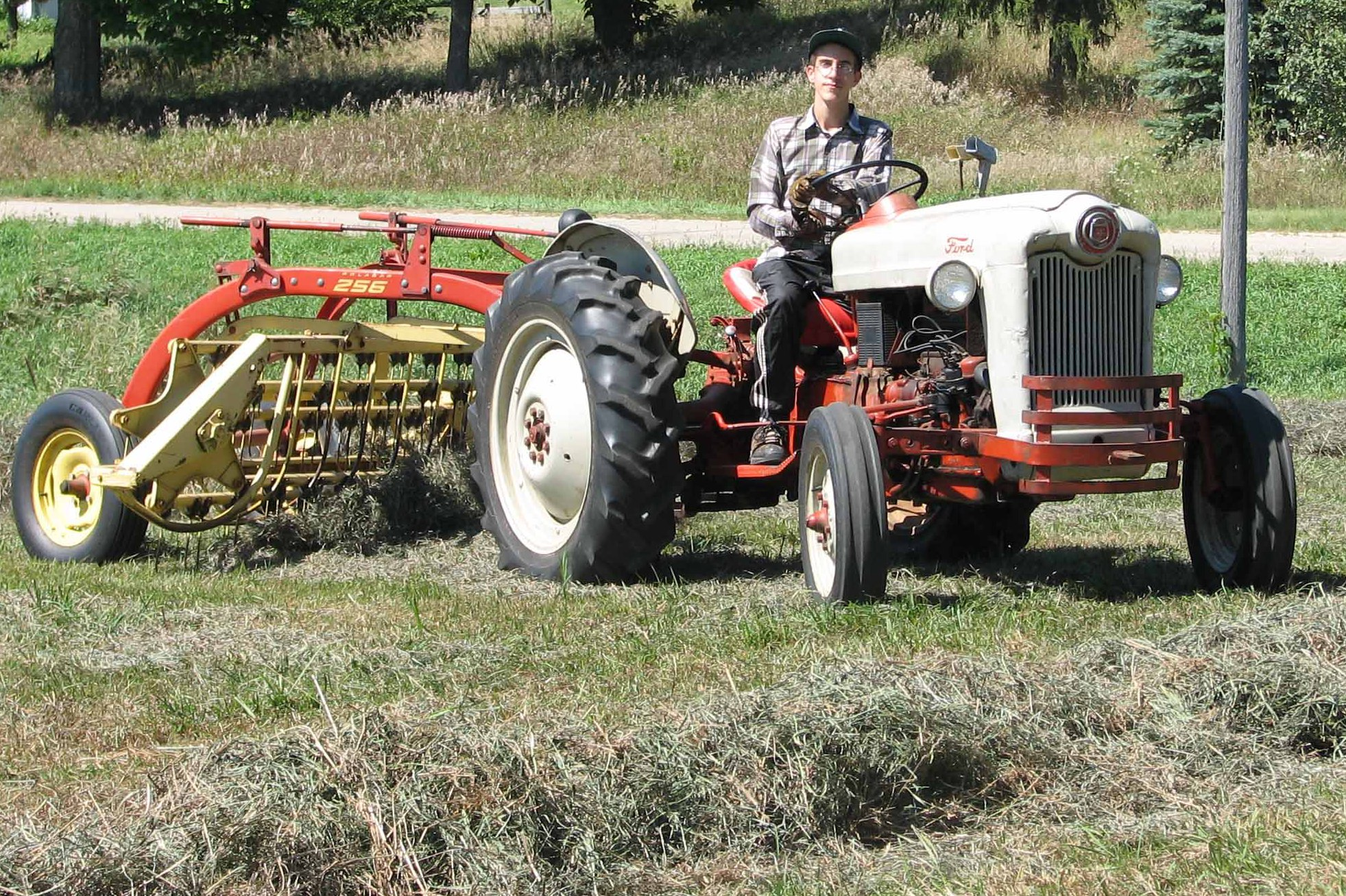
- 1953 Ford Golden Jubilee

Overview
- Manufacturer: Ford
- Production: 1952–1954

Body and chassis
- Class: Agriculture

Powertrain
- Engine: 4 cylinder inline
- Transmission: 4-speed manual

Dimensions
- Wheelbase: 73.875 in (1,876 mm)
- Length: 118.875 in (3,019 mm)
- Width: 64.75 in (1,645 mm)
- Curb weight: 2,550 lb (1,157 kg)

Chronology
- Predecessor: Ford N-Series tractor
- Successor: 600 Series

The Ford NAA tractor is an agricultural tractor that was introduced by Ford as an entirely new model in 1953 and dubbed the Golden Jubilee.

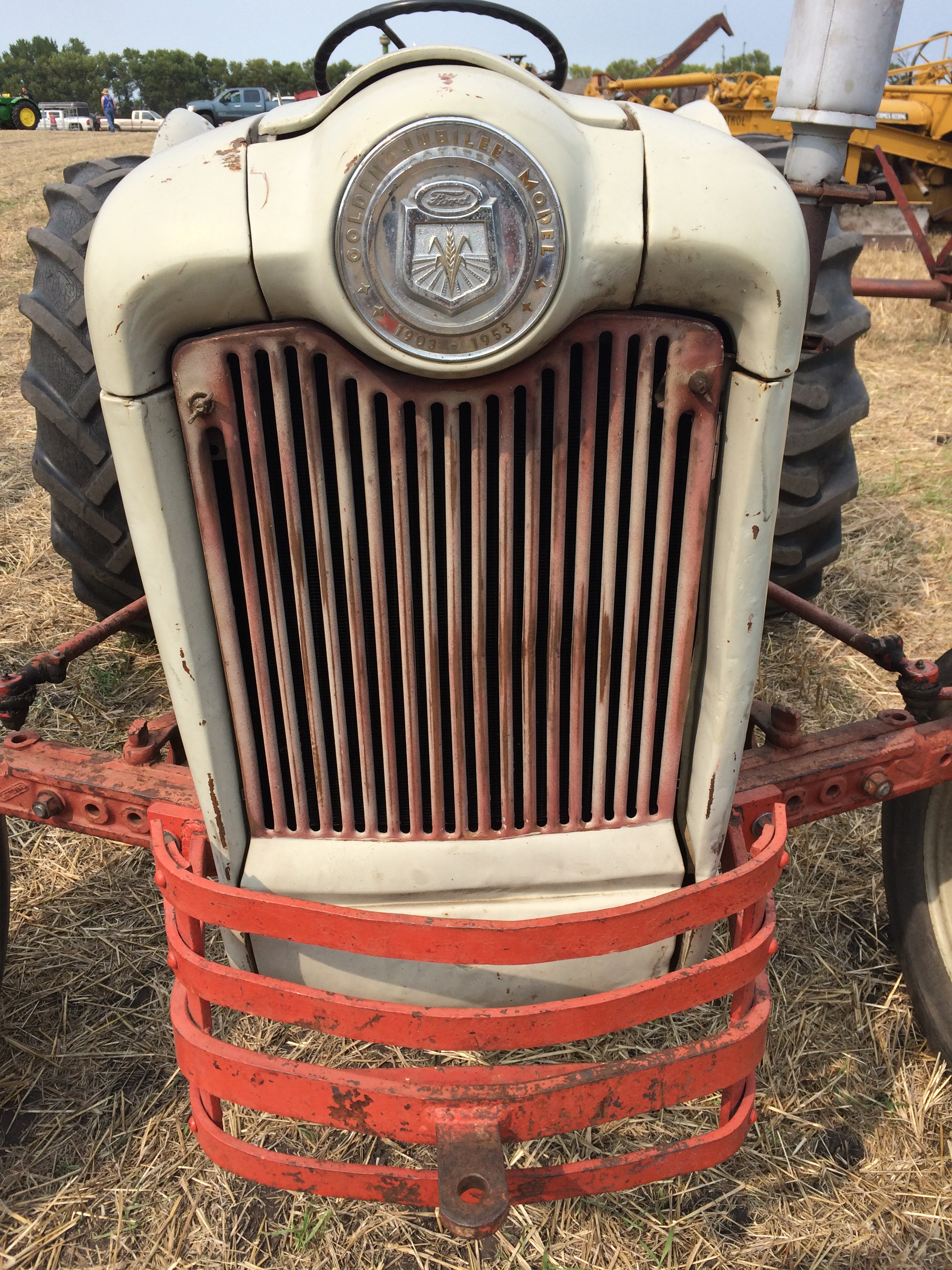
The Golden Jubilee Badge

The NAA designation was a reference to the first three digits of the serial number style used starting with this tractor. It was designed as a replacement for the Ford N-Series tractors. Larger than the 8N, the Golden Jubilee featured live hydraulics, a 50th-year Golden Jubilee badging, an overhead-valve "Red Tiger" four-cylinder engine and streamlined styling, but just as significantly, it was the first tractor Ford built after losing its court battle with Harry Ferguson in 1952 over the patents the Irish inventor held on the Ferguson System three-point hitch.

== Engine ==
Below the NAA's new hood was a 134-cu.in., overhead-valve, gas-burning inline four-cylinder engine worth 32 hp. Ford's British Fordson tractors were readily available with diesel engines, but in the States, diesels were still uncommon. A kerosene-burning NAA, known as the NAB, was an option but found few buyers.

== Transmission ==
A four-speed transmission was standard on the NAA, and auxiliary gearing was available.

== Hydraulics ==
The NAA's Solid System hydraulics relied on an engine-driven hydraulic pump rather than the PTO-driven pump that was standard issue on the N tractors (this meant that the hydraulics could be operated without the PTO being engaged).

A live PTO was optional. This feature used a separate pump to provide hydraulic pressure which was used to disengage the transmission from the rear axle. It was controlled by a hand lever mounted on the side of the tractor. The PTO could still be disconnected by using the existing main foot clutch.

== Other changes ==
The NAA is also slightly larger than its predecessors: four inches longer, four inches higher and 100 pounds heavier at 2,840 pounds. For 1954, The NAA was carried over, sans the Golden Jubilee badging (which is popular with collectors today), with only a gear ratio change. In late 1954, Ford introduced its three-digit number series tractors, which further improved upon the NAA. The 600 incorporated improved brakes and wheel seals as well as an ASAE standard PTO. The 700 was a row-crop tractor that could be ordered with either a tricycle or wide front end.
