= Ford N =

The Ford N refers to the following:

- Ford Model N, an automobile made between 1906 and 1908
- Ford N Series, a line of medium duty trucks made between 1963 and 1969
- Ford N Series Tractors line of tractors made between 1939 and 1954
