= Ferguson monoplane =

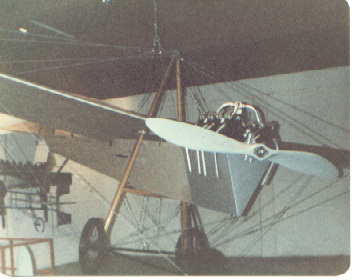
- Replica of Ferguson Monoplane

General information
- Type: Two-seat monoplane
- National origin: United Kingdom
- Manufacturer: J.B. Ferguson & Company
- Designer: Harry Ferguson
- Number built: 1

History
- First flight: 31 December 1909

The Ferguson monoplane was the first Irish heavier-than-air craft to fly. The monoplane was designed by Harry Ferguson and built by his brother's company J.B. Ferguson & Company in Belfast.

== Development ==
Harry Ferguson started as an Irish mechanic and while working with his brother Joe became interested in aircraft. Ferguson first flew his monoplane on 31 December 1909, the first flight of an Irish heavier-than-air craft. The monoplane was flown during 1910, including one flight of 2.5 miles (4 km), but was badly damaged in a heavy landing in December 1910.

== Specifications ==
Data from

General characteristics

- Crew: 2
- Length: 30 ft 0 in (9.14 m)
- Wingspan: 34 ft 0 in (10.36 m)
- Wing area: 192 sq ft (17.8 m^{2})
- Empty weight: 620 lb (281 kg)
- Max takeoff weight: 760 lb (345 kg)
- Powerplant: 1 × J.A.P. piston engine, 35 hp (26 kW)
