= Ford N-series tractor =

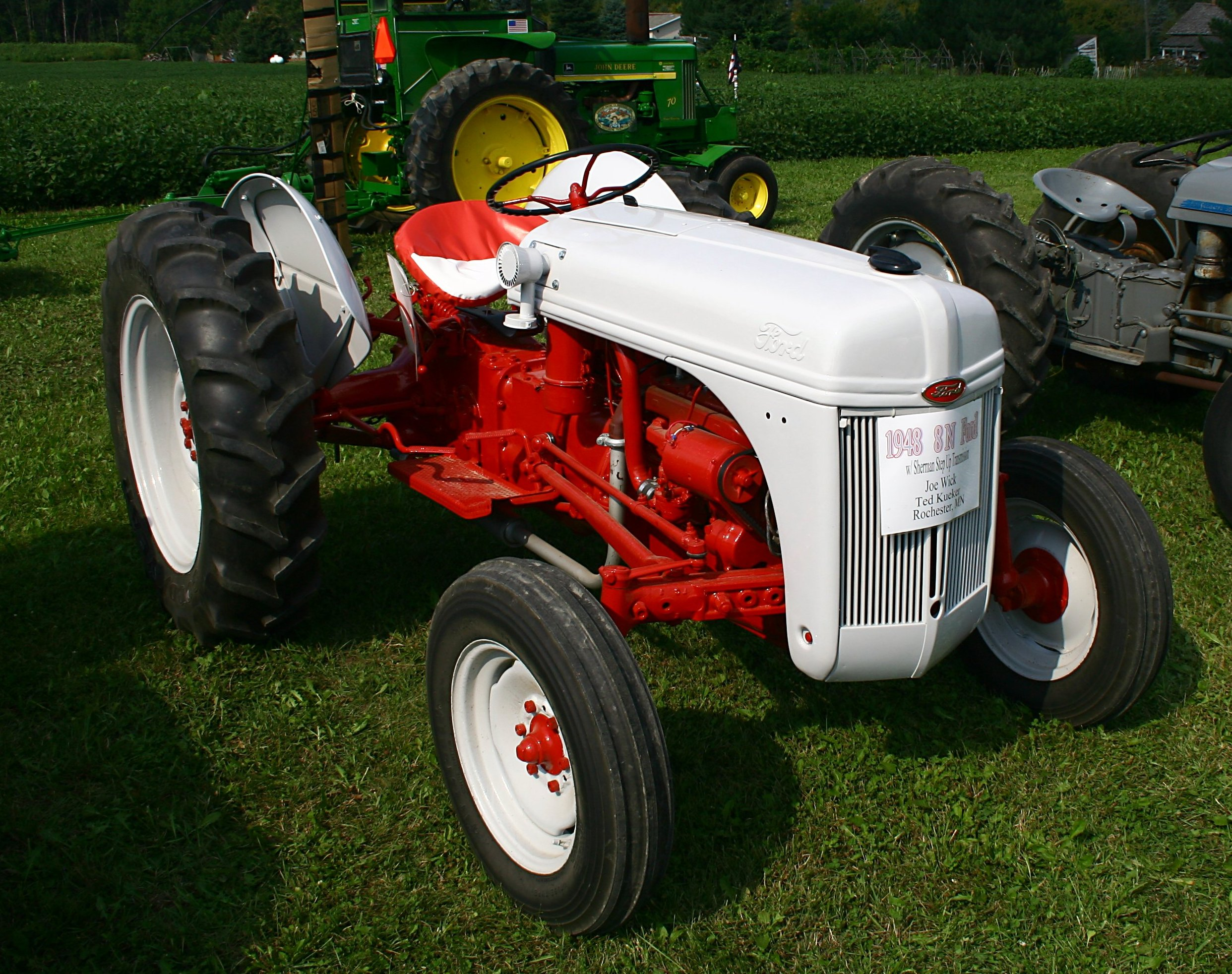
- Restored 1948 Ford 8N

Overview
- Manufacturer: Ford
- Production: 1939–1952

Body and chassis
- Class: Agriculture

Powertrain
- Engine: 4 cylinder inline
- Transmission: 3-speed manual (9N, 2N); 4-speed manual (8N)

Dimensions
- Wheelbase: 70 in (1,778 mm)
- Length: 115 in (2,921 mm)
- Width: 64.75 in (1,645 mm)
- Curb weight: 2,410 lb (1,093 kg)

Chronology
- Predecessor: Fordson tractor
- Successor: Ford NAA tractor

The Ford N-series tractors were a line of farm tractors produced by the Ford Motor Company between 1939 and 1952, spanning the 9N, 2N, and 8N models.

The 9N was the first American-made production-model tractor to incorporate Harry Ferguson's three-point hitch system, a design still used on most modern tractors today. It was released in October 1939. The 2N, introduced in 1942, was the 9N with some features changed or removed due to the restraints of wartime manufacturing. The 8N, which debuted in July 1947, was a largely new machine featuring more power and an improved transmission. By some measures the 8N became the most popular farm tractor of all time in North America. Over 530,000 units of 8N were sold worldwide; the Fordson Model F had sold over 650,000 units worldwide, but in North American sales the 8N surpassed it in popular acclaim and units sold.

== Development of the Ford-Ferguson tractors ==
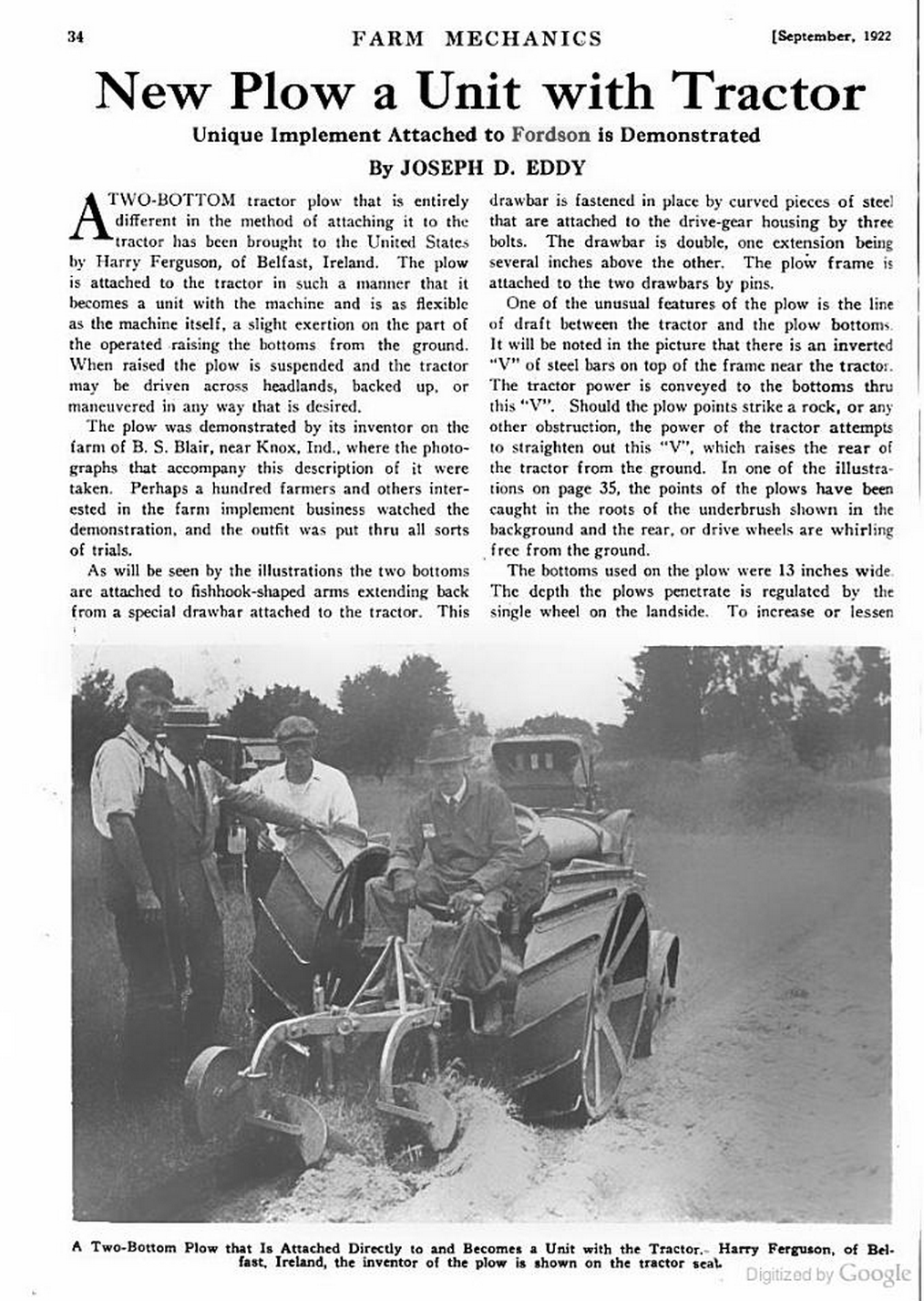
A magazine article showing and describing Harry Ferguson's tractor hitch development status as of 1922. The hitch is shown as an aftermarket attachment mounted on a Fordson tractor. It is a fully mechanical version with a depth wheel (small wheel that sets the plow depth).

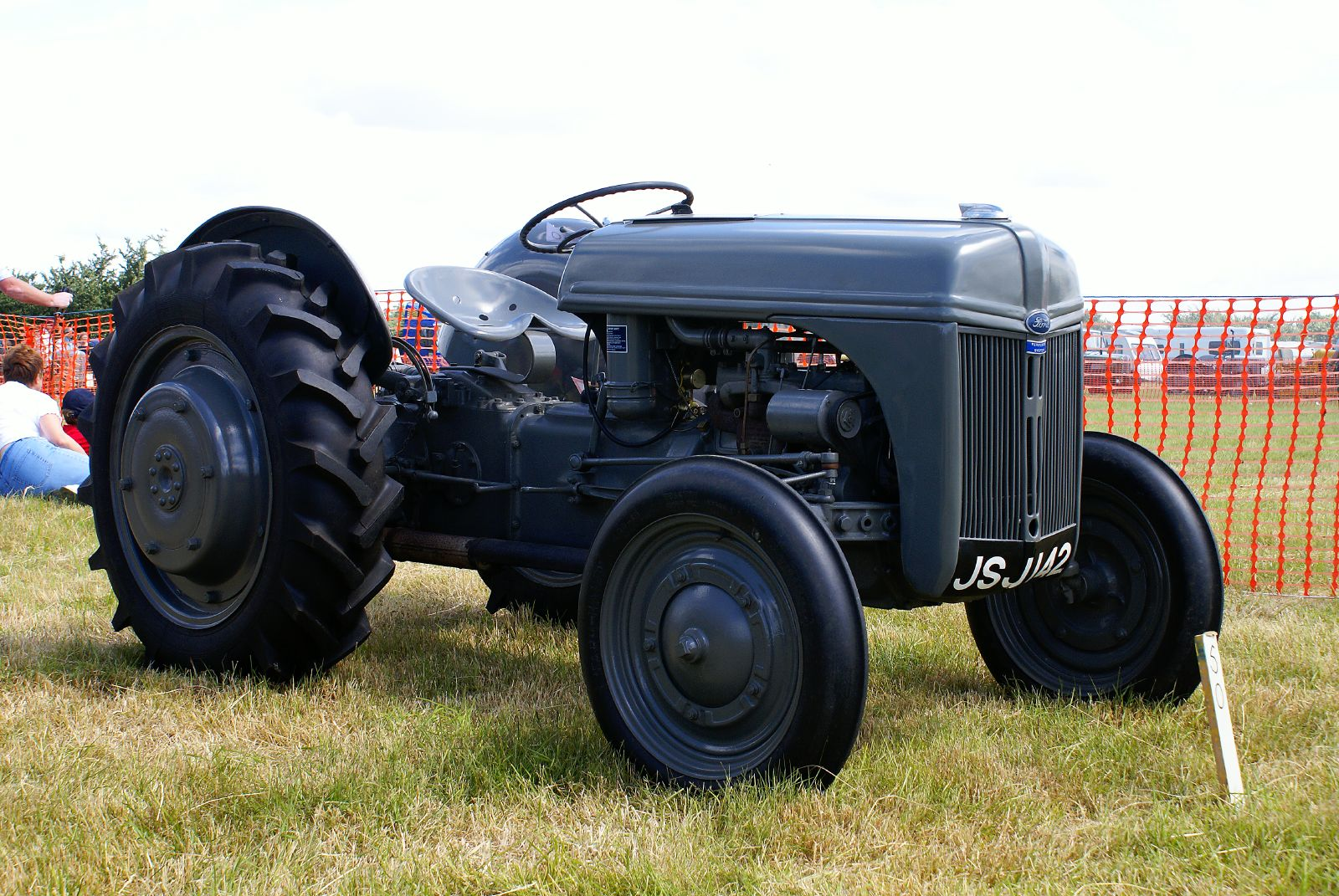
Ford-Ferguson Model 9N

The first genuine Ford tractor was called the Fordson because a misleading Ford brand not related to Henry Ford was squatting on the Ford name at the time (Ford Tractor Company). The Fordson was a tremendous success in North America and Europe from 1917 to 1928. Ford of the U.S. left the tractor business in 1928. Ford Ltd of Britain continued to thrive with the Fordson from 1928 onward. Some British Fordsons were imported to the U.S. during the following decade. Henry Ford continued tractor R&D in the U.S. after 1928. During the 1930s, experiments were made at Ford's Dearborn, Michigan, and Richmond Plantation, Georgia, facilities, creating prototypes of row-crop tricycle Fordsons, V8-powered tractors, one-wheel-drive tractors, and other ideas. But Henry Ford waited to reenter the market, planning to have the right new tractor at the right time to achieve a market-changing success.

In Ireland, businessman Harry Ferguson had been developing and selling various improved hitches, implements, and tractors since the 1910s. His first tractors were adapted from Model T cars. In 1920 and 1921 he gave demonstrations at Cork and Dearborn of his hitches and implements as aftermarket attachments to Fordson tractors. The hitches were mechanical at the time. By 1926, he and a team of longtime colleagues (including Willie Sands and Archie Greer) had developed a good hydraulic three-point hitch. Ferguson put such hitches on Fordsons throughout the 1920s and early 1930s. In the mid-1930s, he had David Brown Ltd build Ferguson-brand tractors with his hitches and implements. In 1938, Eber Sherman, importer of Fordsons from England to the United States and a friend of both Ford and Ferguson, arranged to have Ferguson demonstrate his tractor for Henry Ford. In October 1938 the Ferguson tractor was put through a demonstration before Ford and his engineers. It was light in weight relative to its power, which impressed Ford. Ferguson's successful tractor demonstration led to a handshake agreement with Ford in 1938, whereby Ford would manufacture tractors using the Ferguson three-point hitch system.

Ford Motor Company invested $12 million in tooling to finance Ferguson's new distribution company. The investment resulted in the production of the 9N tractor which was introduced on June 29, 1939. It was officially called a "Ford tractor with the Ferguson system", although the name Ford-Ferguson was widely used. It sold for $585 including rubber tires, power take-off, Ferguson hydraulics, an electric starter, generator, and battery; lights were optional. Ford's 9N further improved the cantankerous Model F by updating the ignition with a distributor and coil. An innovative system of tire mounts for the rear wheels and versatile axle mounts for the fronts enabled farmers to accommodate any width row-crop work they needed. The 9N weighed 2,340 pounds (1,060 kg) and had 13 drawbar horsepower, which could pull a two-bottom plow. It was designed to be safe, quiet and easy to operate. Ford once said "Our competition is the horse."; the 9N was intended for farmers who were not mechanically minded.

An immediate success, the 9N's configuration became an industry standard, which was followed by other tractor manufacturers for fifteen years. Henry Ford passed leadership of his company to grandson Henry Ford II in 1945. By 1946, the younger Ford discovered that, despite its success, the Model N lost Ford Motor Company over $25 million in six years. He reacted by forming Dearborn Motors in November 1946, which took over tractor distribution from Ferguson. Ford informed Ferguson that after July 1947 they would no longer supply tractors to his company. Ferguson sued Henry Ford II, Dearborn Motors and Ford Motor Company and others for $251 million in damages on the basis of patent infringements and conspiracy to monopolize the farm tractor business. Ford Motor Company claimed the patents had already expired by the time of Dearborn Motors' incorporation. Approximately 750,000 9Ns were built, and it was estimated in 2001 that nearly half of these were still in regular use.

Harry Ferguson had understood that the handshake agreement had included the manufacture of the 9N in Britain. World War II intervened and prevented this, although one explanation was that Ford UK was uninterested in the plan.

== N-series models ==
=== 9N ===
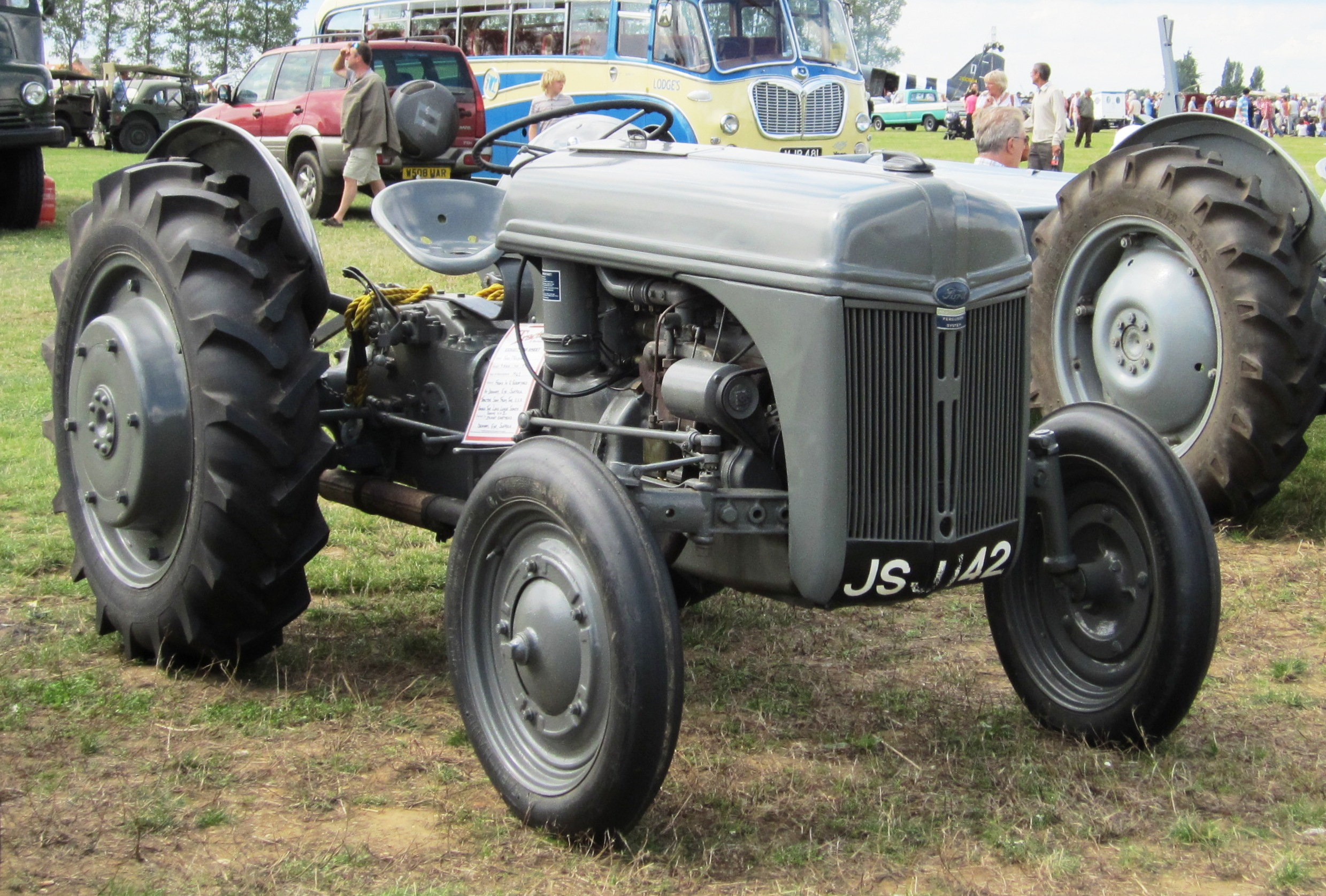
A Ford 9N

The first tractor of the series was the 9N, the first tractor to have both three-point hitch and a rear power take-off (PTO). The 9N was first demonstrated in Dearborn, Michigan on June 29, 1939. Its model name reflected a model-naming system using the last digit of the year of introduction and a letter for product type, with "N" for tractors (hence 9N). Like the Farmall, it was designed to be a general-purpose row-crop tractor for use on smaller farms. An extremely simple tractor, the 9N was fitted with the Ferguson system three-point hitch, a three-speed transmission, and featured footpegs instead of running boards. The 9N's relatively tall and wide-spaced front wheel design resulted in somewhat sluggish steering and reduced maneuverability compared to competing machines such as John Deere's Models A and B, and the Farmall "Letter series". The 9N had variable front track, a valuable feature for row-crop cultivation, via front half-axles that could be slid in and out and pinned in place. It also had variable rear track via the reversible offset of the rear wheel design (flipping the rear wheels around 180°, moving the formerly inboard side to the outboard side, widened the rear track). Uniquely, the exhaust was routed underneath the tractor, much like an automobile. All 9N tractors were painted dark grey. This tractor has a rear PTO, which could be used to drive three-point or towed implements. The Ferguson hitch was designed to solve some of the problems found in the earlier Fordson tractors, such as flipping over if the plow hit an obstruction. The upper link also would adjust the hydraulic lift to use the drag of the plow to improve traction when engaged. This was known as draft control. During the Second World War, the US Navy used the 9N on board their aircraft carriers for towing aircraft and was nicknamed the "Moto Tug". The United States Air Force and RAF also used it for towing aircraft.

The original 9N engine was a four-cylinder engine and was designed to be powered by distillate fuels. The engine shares the same bore and stroke sizes as one bank of the Ford V8 automobile engines. A few standard Ford auto and truck parts, such as timing gears and valve tappets, were used in this engine.

The ford 9N engine was a side-valve, four-cylinder engine, with a 3.19-inch (81 mm) bore, 3.75-inch (95 mm) stroke, providing a displacement of 120 cubic inches (2,000 cm^{3}). The transmission was the standard three-speed.

The finished tractor weighed 2,340 pounds (1,060 kg), and initially sold for US$585. This was an advantage, as tractors from other manufacturers cost almost twice as much.

=== 2N ===
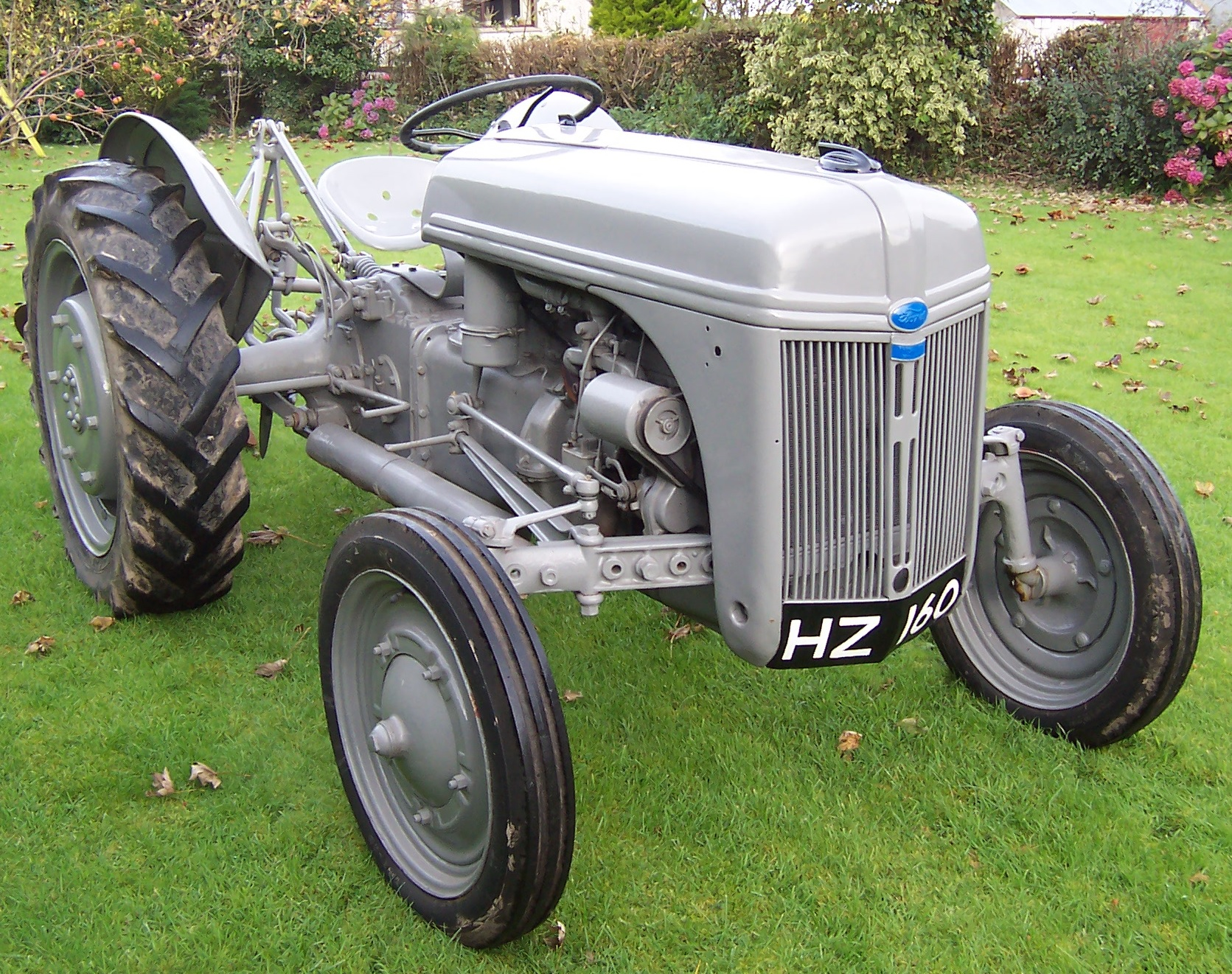
1944 Ford-Ferguson 2NAN

The 9N was revised a number of times, until being relaunched as the 2N in 1942. The 2N still came in dark grey, but now had added improvements, including a larger cooling fan and a pressurized radiator. However, the 2N, like the 9N, still had only a 3-speed transmission, a disadvantage compared to many tractors at the time, such as the Farmall A and M. By this time, wartime regulations had imposed manufacturing economies, and some 2Ns can be seen with all-steel wheels. Batteries were reserved for the war effort, so the all-steel wheel tractors came with a magneto ignition system instead of a battery and had to be started with a hand-crank.

Introducing a new model name also allowed Ford to raise the price of the tractor. Wartime price controls prevented the raising of prices on existing models, but they could not determine the price of a "new" model. Despite the model name change, the serial numbers continued to be prefixed with "9N".

After the war the steel wheels and magneto system were replaced with rubber tires and batteries, respectively.

=== Ferguson and Ford part ways ===
In 1945 due to Henry Ford's failing health, Henry Ford II, his grandson, took over the Ford Motor Company. Since the original agreement between Ford and Ferguson was sealed with a handshake (versus a written contract) and included the notion that either party could terminate it at any time without reason, Henry Ford II didn't feel the need to continue to honor it. Ferguson was furious and sued Ford Motor Company. A few years later his Ferguson interests were merged with Massey Harris, a Canadian company, to become Massey Ferguson.

=== 8N ===
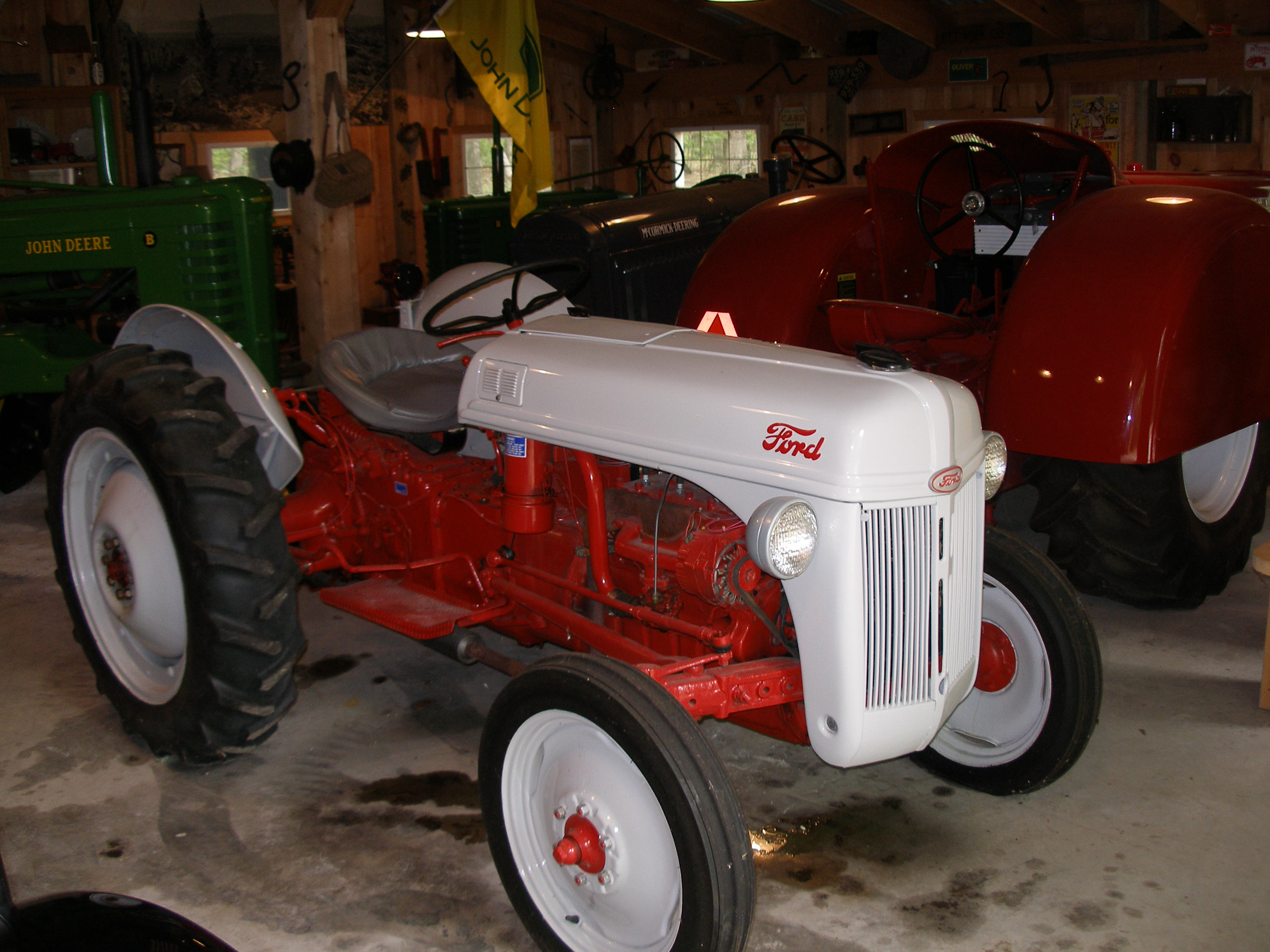
A restored Ford 8N

Official production of the 8N tractor began in July 1947. Equipped with a 4-speed transmission, this model was destined to become the top-selling individual tractor of all time in North America. The most noticeable differences between the 8N and its predecessors was the inclusion of a 4-speed transmission instead of a 3-speed in the 9N and 2N, and an increase in both PTO and drawbar horsepower. The other big change on the 8N was the addition of a 'Position-control' setting for the hydraulics. This change was made partially to improve flexibility in varying soil conditions, and partially to evade Harry Ferguson's patent on the hydraulic system. The original automatic draft control on the Ferguson system would allow the depth of the implement to vary based on soil conditions, which did not work well for some implements. The new Position Control setting bypassed the draft control and allowed the implement to remain at a consistent position relative to the position of the Touch Control lever. A continued drawback to this series of tractor, was the lack of a "live" PTO. Without a live PTO certain implements such as brush cutters which store inertial energy could send that back into the transmission. This would cause the tractor to surge forward if the clutch were disengaged. This was addressed with the advent of the PTO overrunning coupler.

The 8N was equipped with running boards and was painted lighter gray on the sheetmetal and red on the body. It was the first Ford tractor to feature a clutch on the left side and independent brakes on the right. The wide-spaced front wheel design of the 9N and 2N was retained. In 1950 the 8N design changed to feature a side-mounted distributor, as well a Proofmeter (combined speedometer, tachometer, hour meter) located on the lower right portion of the dash.

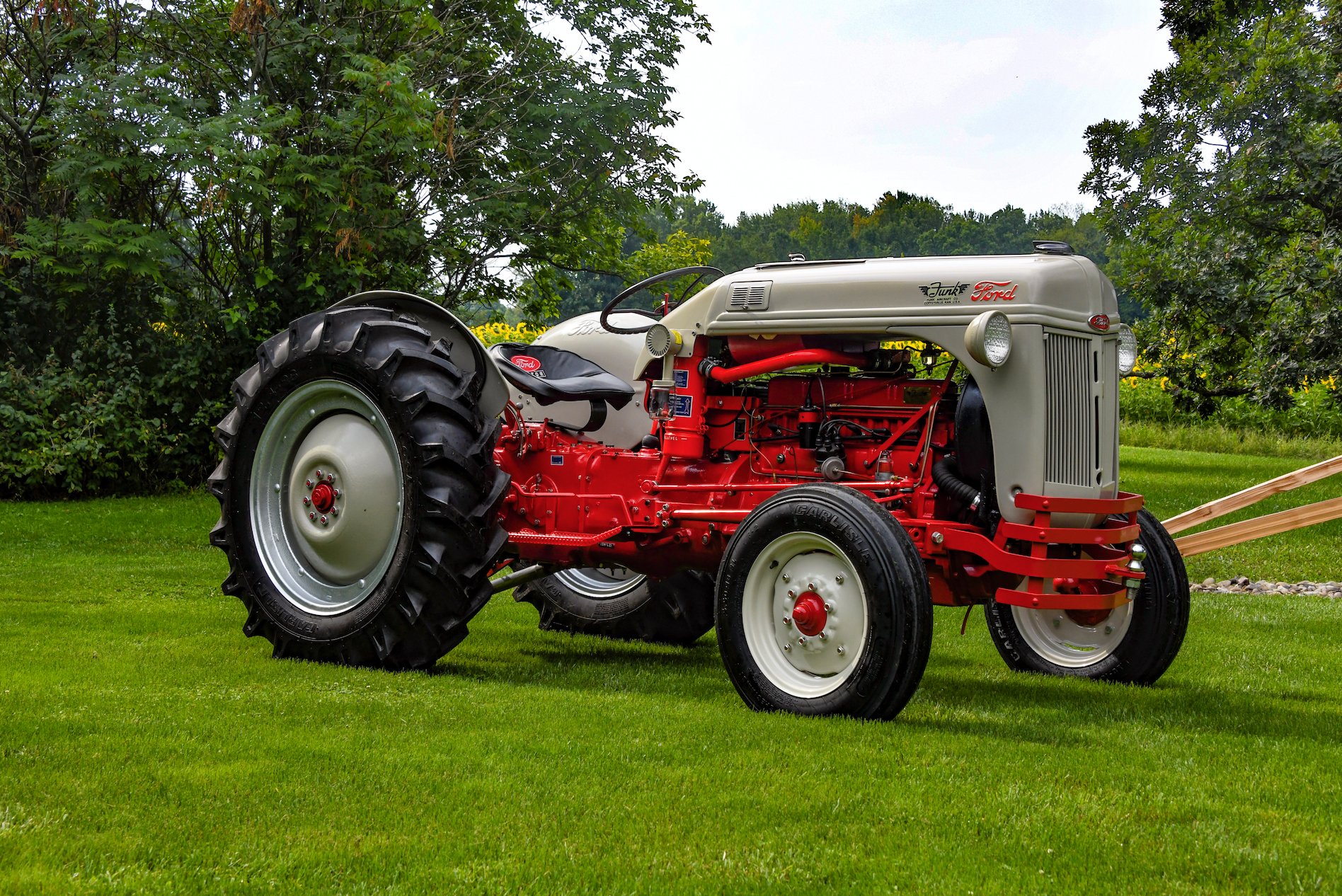
1952 Ford Funk 8N factory conversion. This tractor has two gas tanks, an OHV six cylinder Ford industrial 215 engine and a Sherman transmission

The Funk Aircraft Company offered conversions for Ford Tractors until the factory burnt down in late 1952.

== Replacement ==
In 1953 the N-series tractor was replaced with the all-new model dubbed the Golden Jubilee, also known as the Ford NAA. The NAA designation was a reference to the first three digits of the serial style used starting with this tractor. Larger than the 8N, the Golden Jubilee featured live hydraulics and an all-new overhead valve engine. The new tractor was four inches longer, four inches higher and 100 pounds (45 kg) heavier at 2,840 pounds (1,290 kg) than the N series. The following 600 series and later numbered model tractors were derived from the NAA. The 'N' in the serial number sometimes causes confusion that the Golden Jubilee tractor was a continuation of the N series.

== New Holland tribute tractor ==
Beginning in 2009, New Holland produced a retro-styled tractor designed to resemble the Ford 8N. The tractor was based on the Boomer 3050-series tractor. The tractor featured a hood styled after the 8N and a gray and red paint scheme similar to the 8N. The tractor was produced for three years through 2011. The tractor had no parts in common with the original Ford 8N.

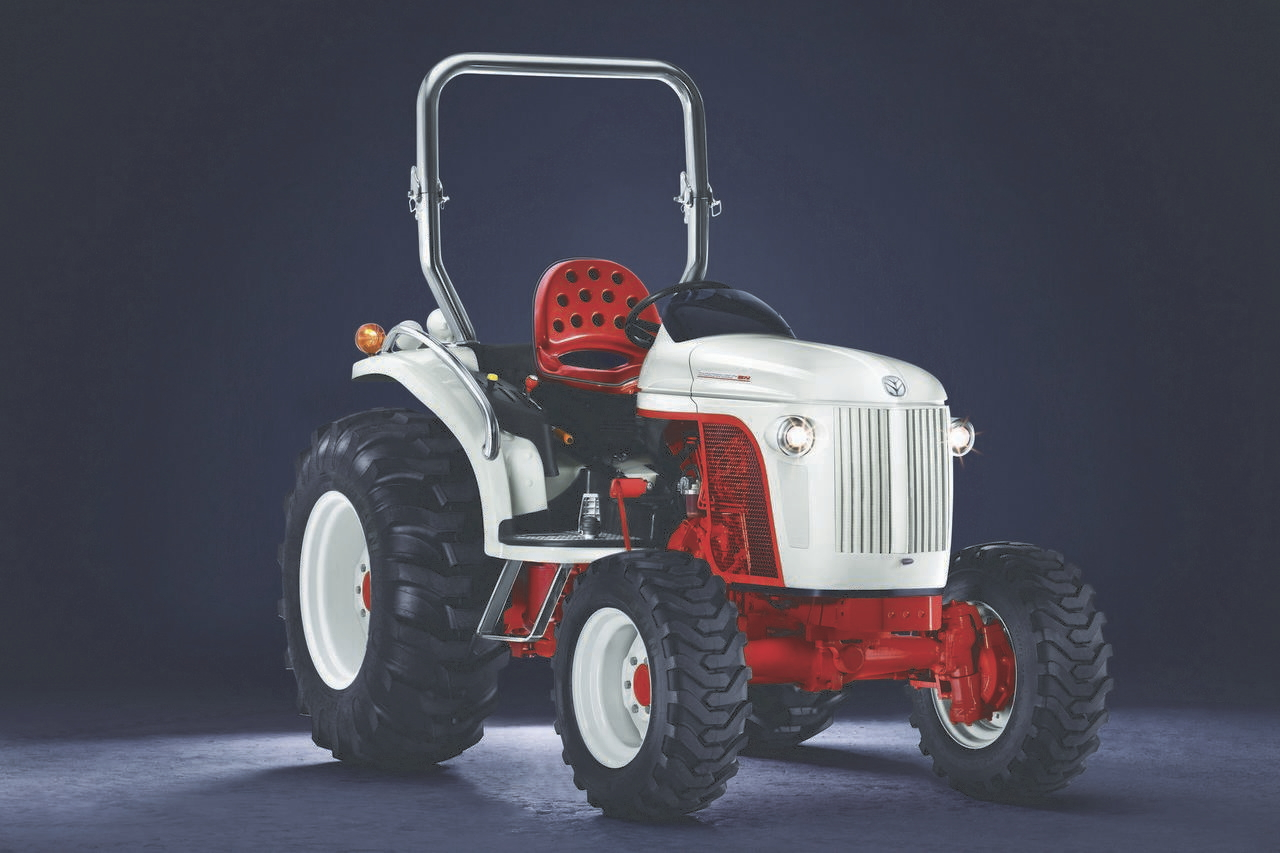
New Holland Boomer 8N

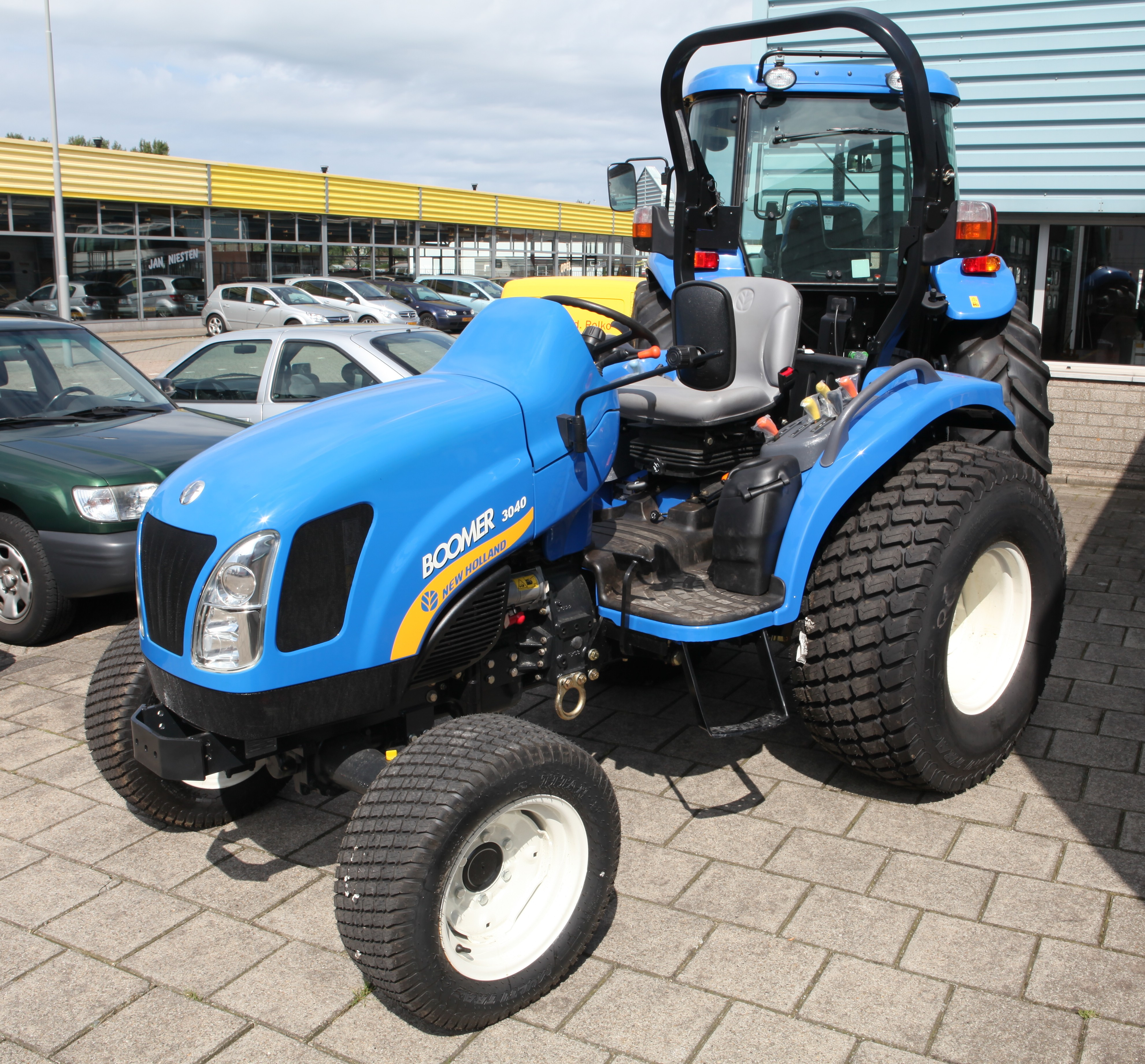
Boomer 3040 (stand-in for 3050)

== See also ==
- John Deere & Company – a competitor
- Farmall – a competitor
- J. I. Case – a competitor

== General and cited references ==
- Ertel, Patrick W. (2001). The American Tractor: A Century of Legendary Machines. Minneapolis, MN, USA: MBI Publishing. ISBN 0-7603-0863-2.
- Leffingwell, Randy (1996). Classic Farm Tractors: History of the Farm Tractor. Osceola, WI, USA: Motorbooks International. ISBN 978-0-7603-0246-0.
- Peterson, Chester; Beemer, Rod (1997). Ford N Series Tractors. Farm Tractor Color History. Motorbooks International. ISBN 978-0760302897. OCLC 36024051.
