= Harry Ferguson =

British engineer and inventor (1884–1960)

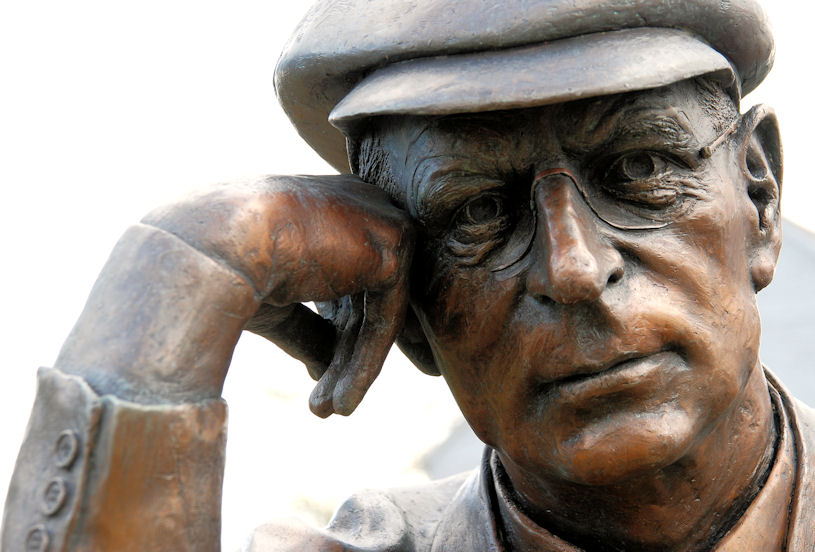
- The 2008 sculpture of Harry Ferguson at Dromara
- Born: Henry George Ferguson; 4 November 1884; County Down, Ireland
- Died: 25 October 1960 (aged 75); Stow-on-the-Wold, Gloucestershire, England, United Kingdom
- Known for: Inventor of modern tractor
- Scientific career
- Fields: Engineering

Henry George Ferguson (4 November 1884 – 25 October 1960) was an Irish mechanic and inventor who is noted for his role in the development of the modern agricultural tractor and its three-point linkage system, for being the first person in Ireland to build and fly his own aeroplane, and for developing the first four-wheel drive Formula One car, the Ferguson P99.

Today his name lives on in the name of the Massey Ferguson company.

== Early life ==
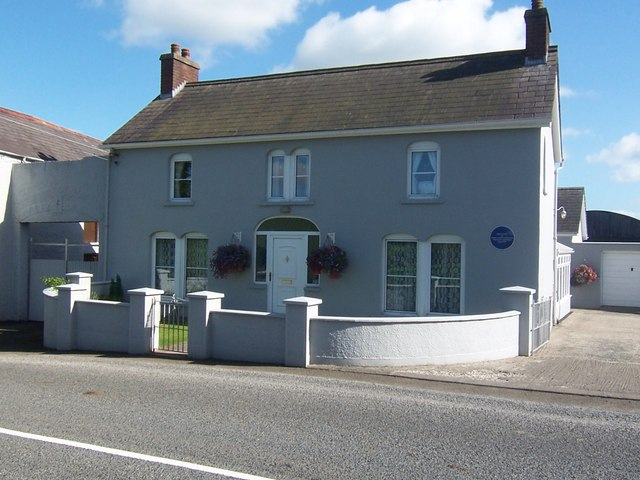
Harry Ferguson's birthplace

Ferguson was born at Growell, near Dromore, in County Down, Ireland, the son of a James Ferguson, a farmer, and Minnie Bell, daughter of Joseph Bell, Clerk of the Union of Newry. In 1902, Ferguson went to work with his older brother, Joe (Joseph Bell Ferguson), in his bicycle and car repair business. While working there as a mechanic, he developed an interest in aviation, visiting airshows abroad. In 1904, he began to race motorcycles.

== Aviation ==
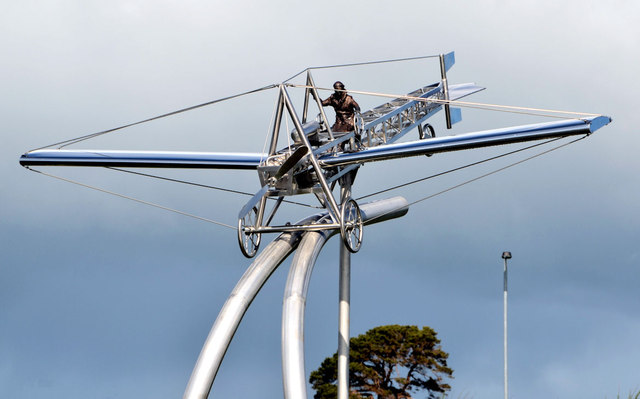
A metal sculpture near the A1 road depicting Ferguson's first flight

In the 1900s the young Harry Ferguson became fascinated with the newly emerging technology of powered human flight and particularly with the exploits of the Wright brothers, the American aviation pioneers who made the first plane flight in 1903 in North Carolina, USA.

The first person to accomplish powered flight in the UK was Alliot Verdon Roe in June 1908, who also flew an aeroplane of his own design, but this had not yet been achieved in Ireland. Ferguson began to develop a keen interest in the mechanics of flying and travelled to several air shows, including exhibitions in 1909 at Blackpool and Rheims where he took notes of the design of early aircraft. Harry convinced his brother that they should attempt to build an aircraft at their Belfast workshop and working from Harry's notes, they worked on the design of a plane, the Ferguson monoplane.

After making many changes and improvements, they transported their new aircraft by towing it behind a car through the streets of Belfast up to Hillsborough Park to make their first attempt at flight. They were at first thwarted by propeller trouble but continued to make technical alterations to the plane. After a delay of nearly a week caused by bad weather, the Ferguson monoplane finally took off from Hillsborough on 31 December 1909. Harry Ferguson became the first Irish person to fly and the first Irish person to build and fly their own aeroplane.

== Business career ==
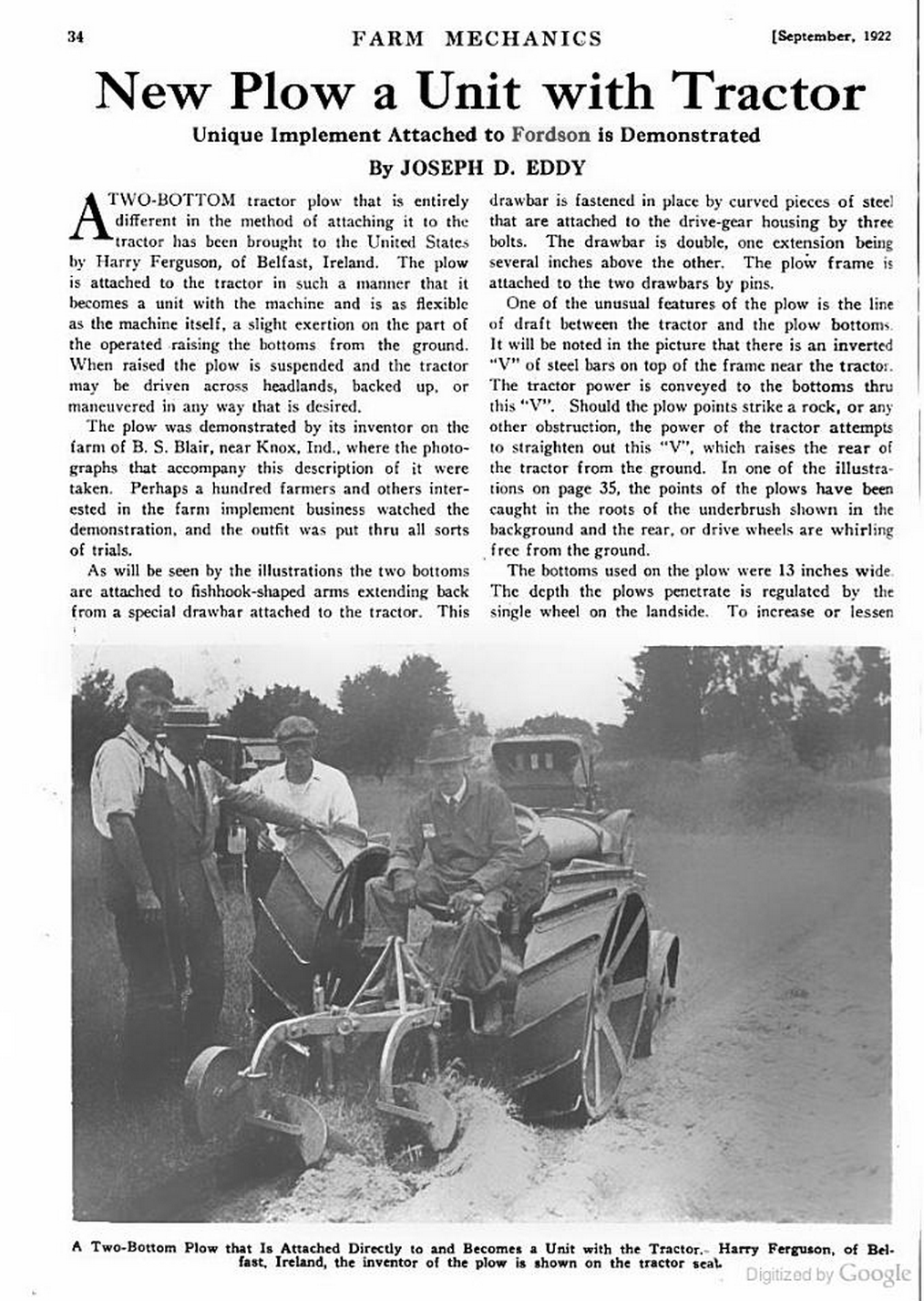
A magazine article showing and describing Ferguson's tractor hitch development status as of 1922. It is a fully mechanical version with a depth wheel (small wheel that sets the plough depth).

After falling out with his brother over the safety and future of aviation Ferguson decided to go it alone, and in 1911 founded a company selling Maxwell, Star and Vauxhall cars and Overtime Tractors. Ferguson saw at first-hand the weakness of having tractor and plough as separate articulated units, and in 1917 he devised a plough that could be rigidly attached to a Model T Ford car—the Eros, which became a limited success, competing with the Model F Fordson.

In 1917 Ferguson met Charles E. Sorensen while Sorensen was in England scouting production sites for the Fordson tractor. They discussed methods of hitching the implement to the tractor to make them a unit (as opposed to towing the implement like a trailer). In 1920 and 1921 Ferguson demonstrated early versions of his three-point linkage on Fordsons at Cork and at Dearborn. Ferguson and Henry Ford discussed putting the Ferguson System of hitch and implements onto Fordson tractors at the factory, but no deal was struck. At the time the hitch was mechanical. On 12 February 1925, at Belfast, Northern Ireland, Ferguson filed a patent titled "Apparatus for Coupling Agricultural Implements to Tractors and Automatically Regulating the Depth of Work" which is today known as the Ferguson Master Patent. This is the invention of the modern tractor for which Ferguson is best known. In it, Ferguson states different ways to attach quickly interchangeable implements to tractors so that for the first time in history tractor and implements act as a single unit. Automatic depth control and weight transfer are other important parts of the patent. This can be achieved by electrical, mechanical or fluid means. Ferguson and his team of longtime colleagues, including Willie Sands and Archie Greer, soon developed a hydraulic version, which was patented in 1926. After one or two false starts, Ferguson eventually founded the Ferguson-Sherman Inc., with Eber and George Sherman.

The new enterprise manufactured the Ferguson plough incorporating the patented "Duplex" hitch system mainly intended for the Fordson "F" tractor. Following several more years of development, Ferguson's new hydraulic version of the three-point linkage was first seen on his prototype Ferguson black tractor or 'Irish tractor' as Harry called it, now in the Ulster Transport Museum. A production version of the "Black" was introduced in May 1936, made at one of the David Brown factories in Huddersfield, Yorkshire, and designated Ferguson Model A tractor.

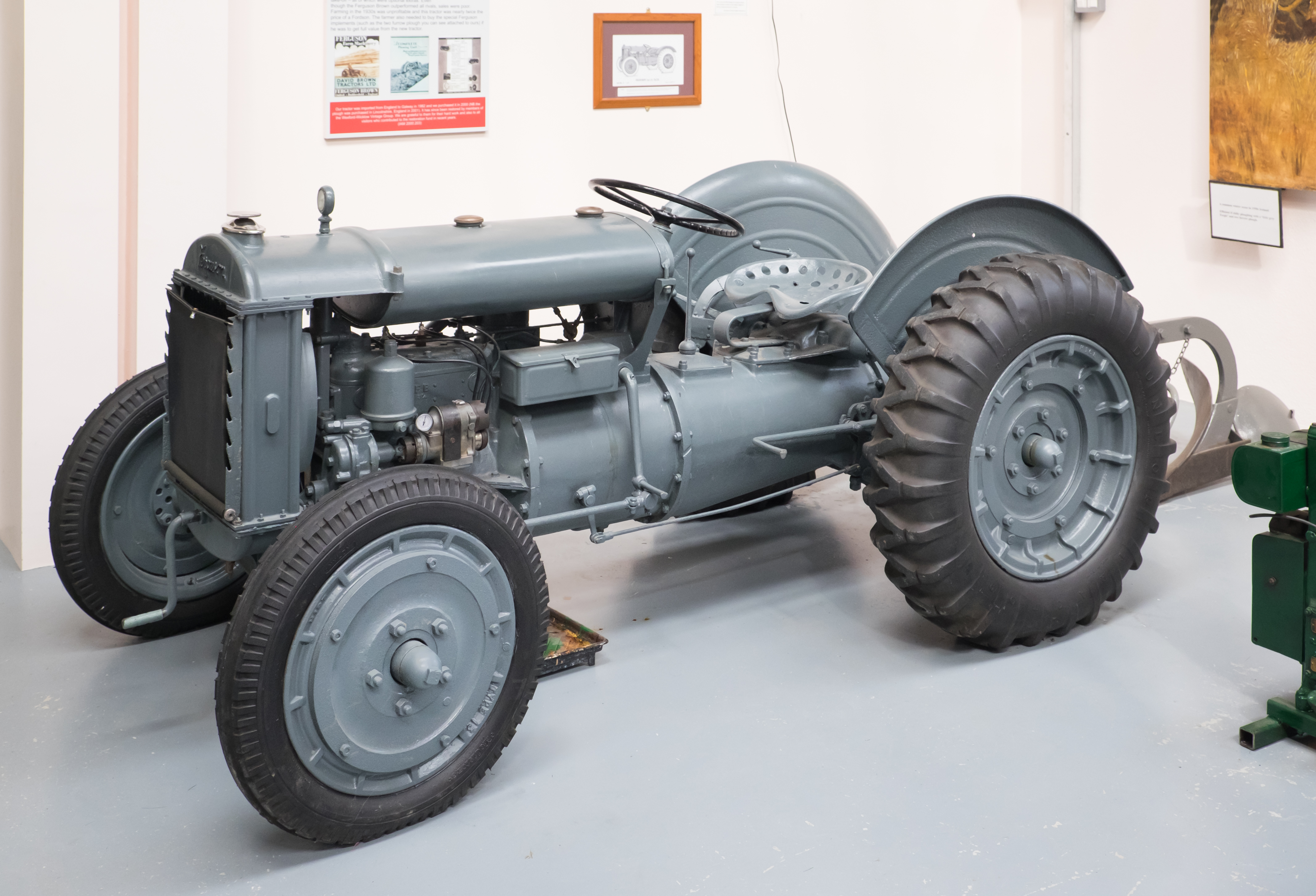
Ferguson Model A tractor 1936

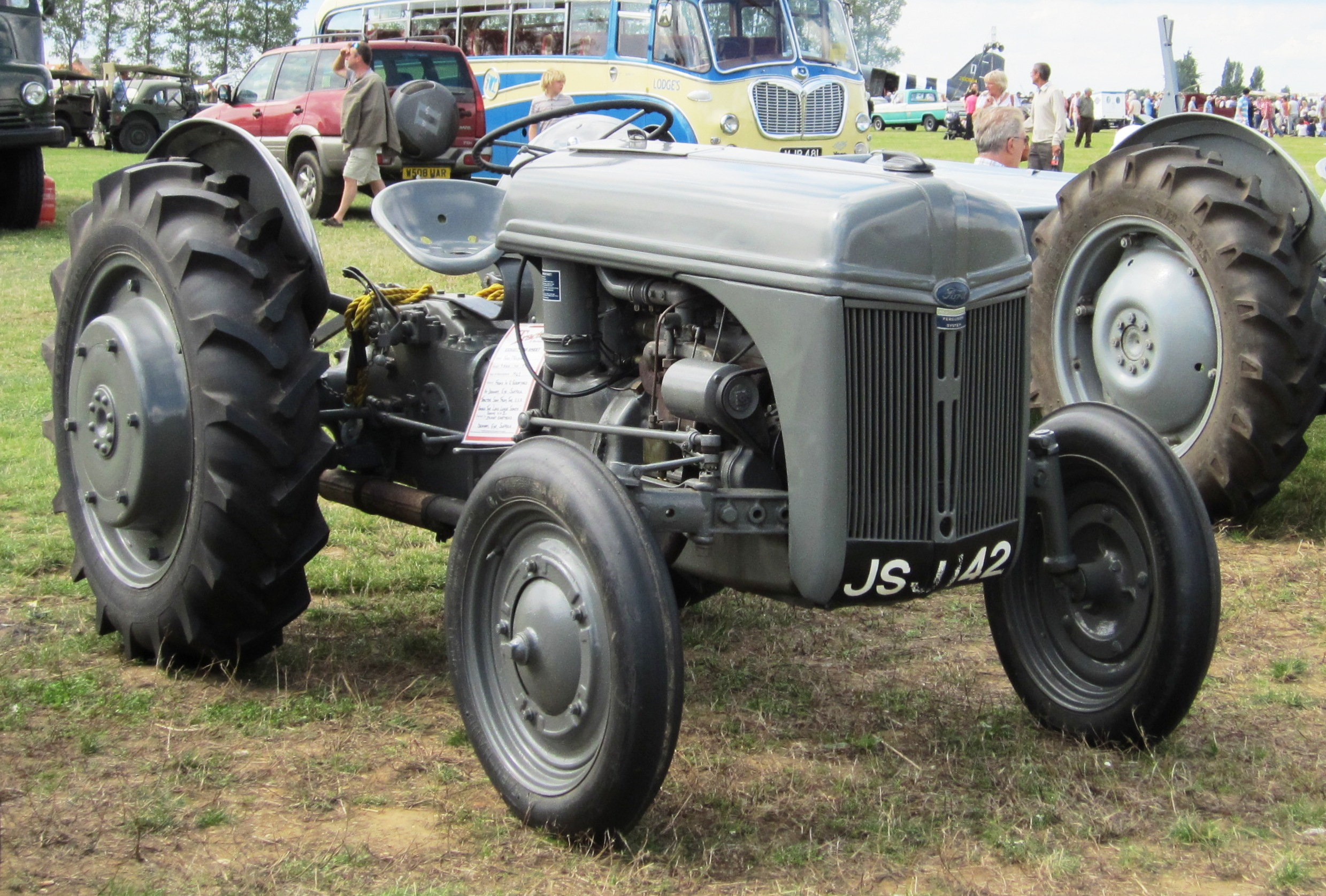
Ford-Ferguson tractor 1939

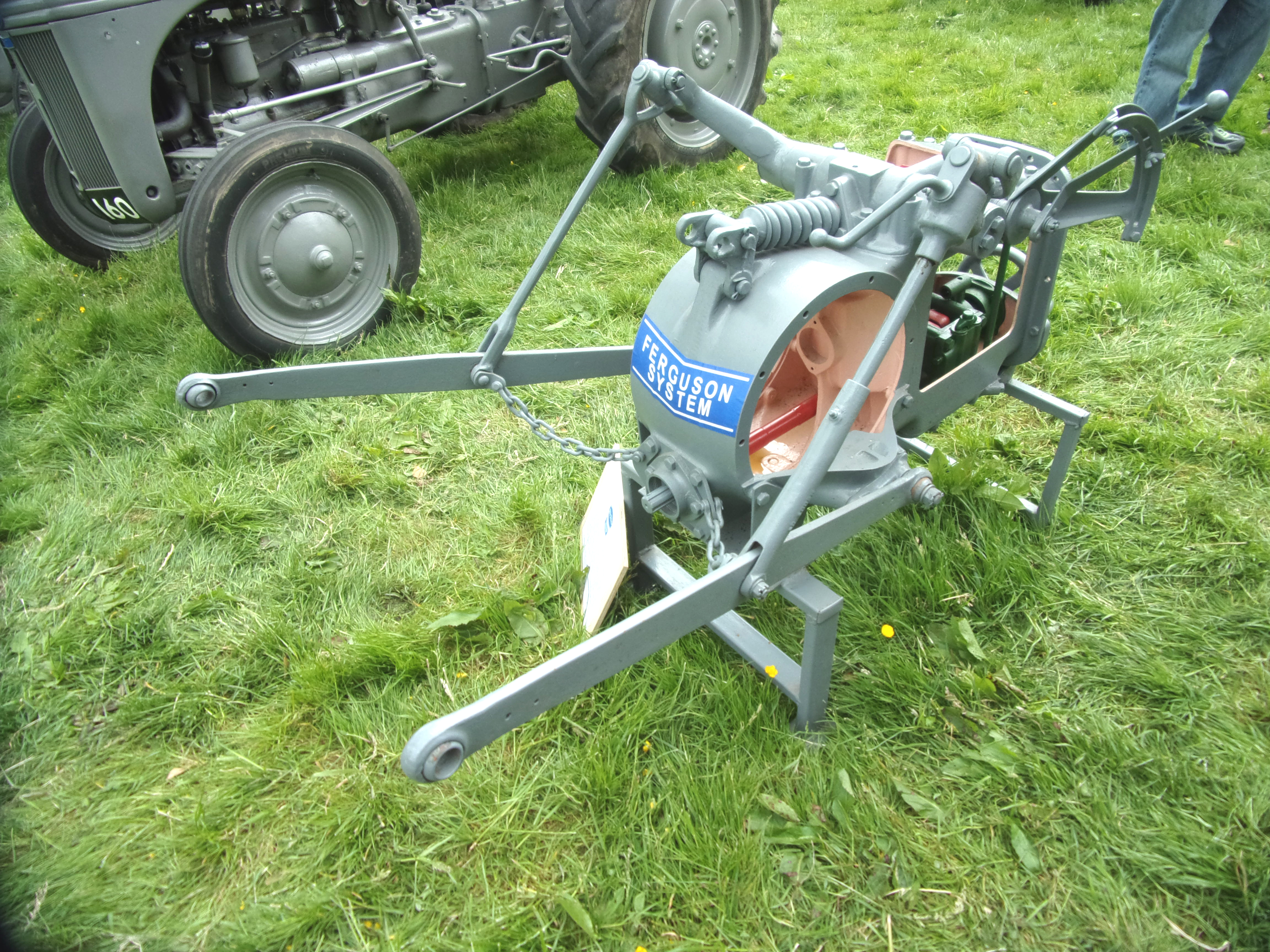
Ferguson system demonstrator

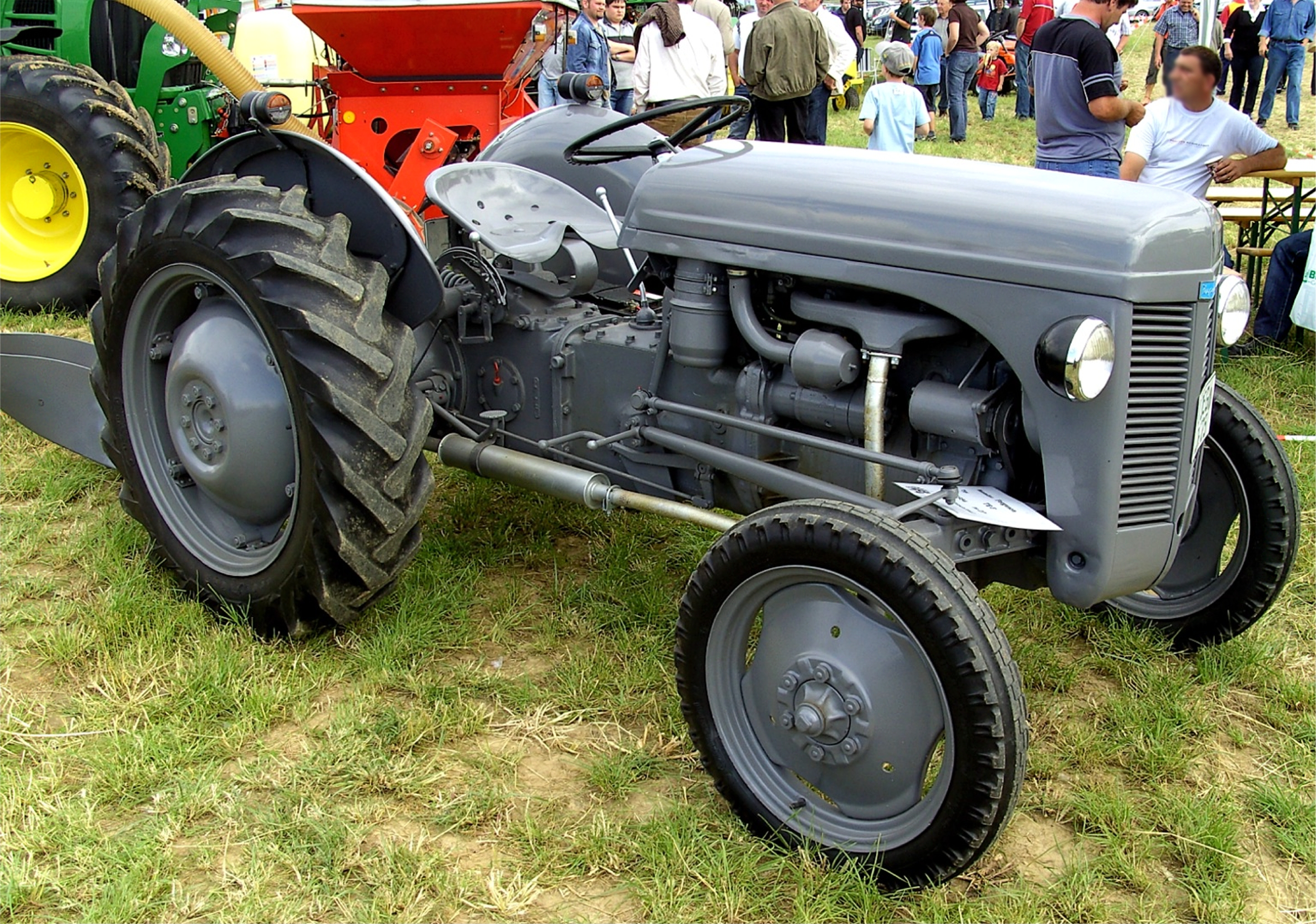
Ferguson TE20 tractor 1946

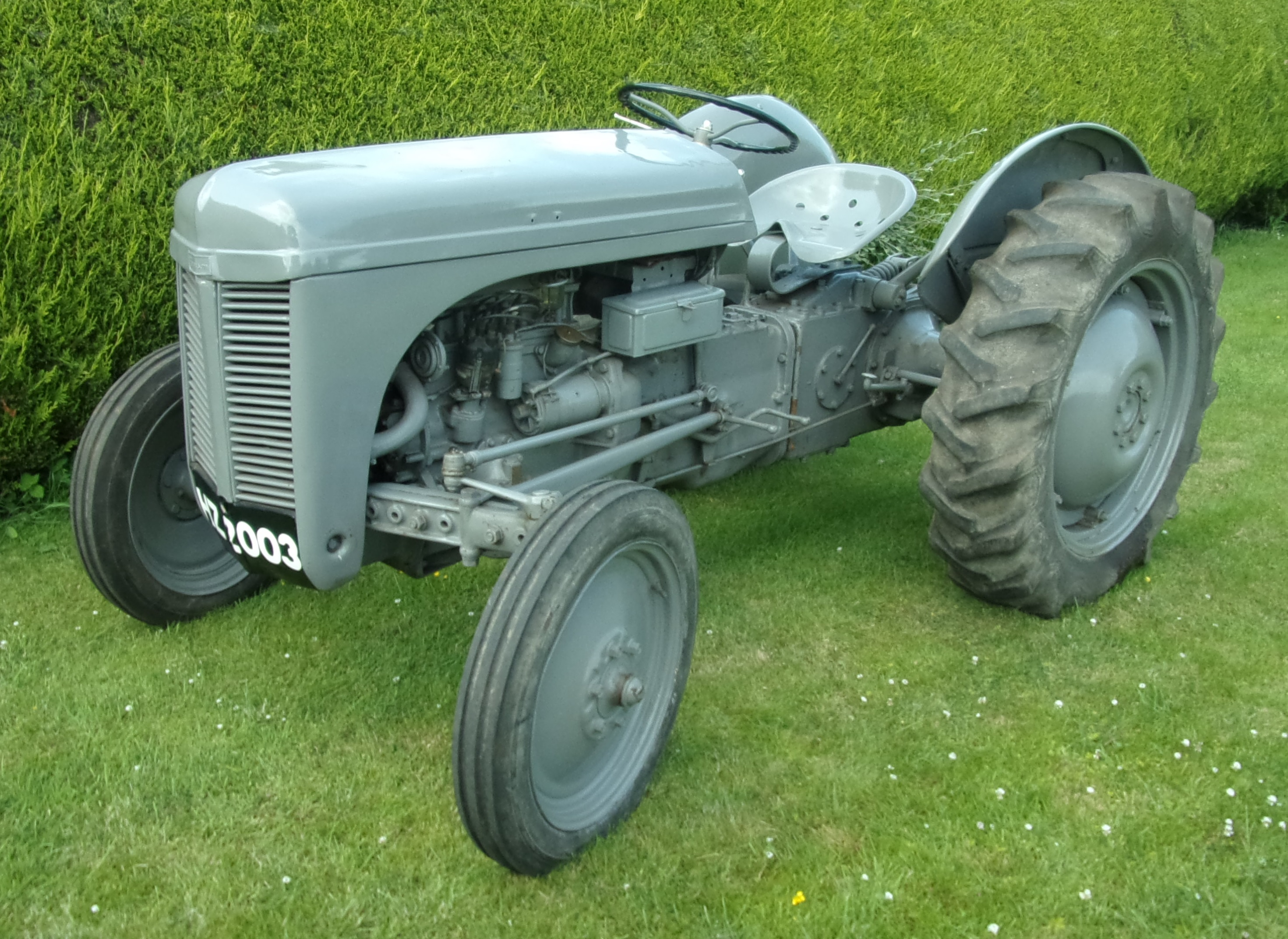
1947 Ferguson TEA 20

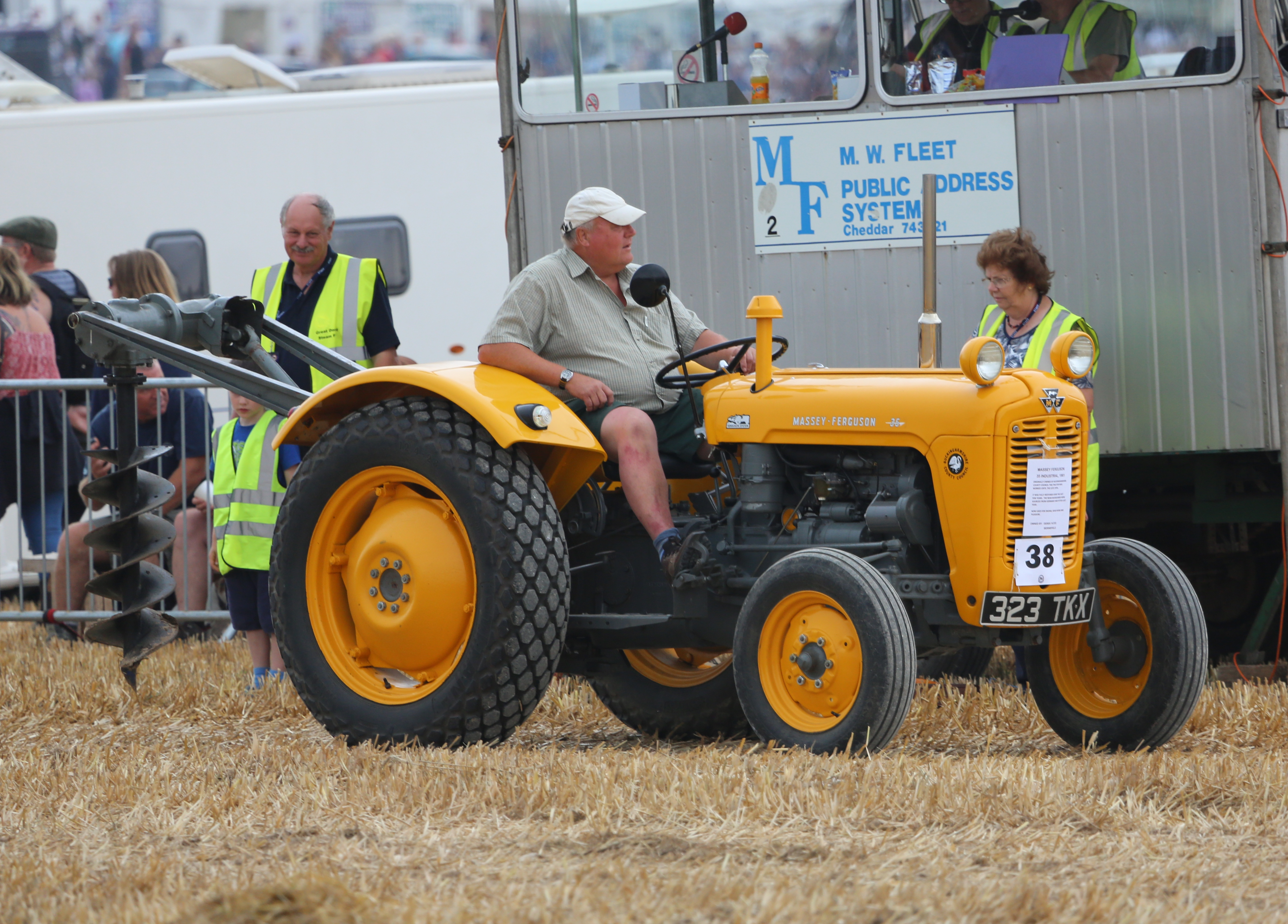
Massey Ferguson tractor 1957

Ferguson's interests were merged with those of David Brown junior to create the Ferguson-Brown Company.

In October 1938, Ferguson demonstrated his latest tractor to Henry Ford at Dearborn, and they made the famous "handshake agreement". Ferguson took with him his latest patents covering future improvements to the Ferguson tractor and it is these that led to the Ford-Ferguson 9N introduced to the world on 29 June 1939. The 1938 agreement intended that the Ferguson tractor should also be made in the UK at the Ford Ltd factory at Dagenham, Essex but Ford did not have full control at Dagenham and, while Ford Ltd did import US-made 9N/2Ns, Dagenham did not make any.

Henry Ford II, Ford's grandson, ended the handshake agreement on 30 June 1947, following unsuccessful negotiations with Ferguson, but continued to produce a tractor, the 8N, incorporating Ferguson's inventions, the patents on almost all of which had not yet expired, and Ferguson was left without a tractor to sell in North America. Ferguson's reaction was a lawsuit demanding compensation for damage to his business and for Ford's illegal use of his designs. The case was settled out of court in April 1952 for just over $9 million. The court case cost him about half of that and a great deal of stress and ill health.

By 1952, most of the important Ferguson patents had expired, and this allowed Henry Ford II to claim that the case had not restricted Ford's activities too much. It follows that all the world's other tractor manufacturers could also use Ferguson's inventions, which they duly did. A year later Ferguson merged with Massey Harris to become Massey-Harris-Ferguson Co., later Massey Ferguson.

=== Standard Motor Company ===
As a consequence of Dagenham's failure to make the tractors, Harry Ferguson made a deal with Sir John Black of the Standard Motor Company to refit their armaments factory at Banner Lane, Coventry. Production of the latest Ferguson tractor, the TE20, started in the autumn of 1946, with over 20,800 TEs being built by the end of 1947. To fill the gap in Ferguson's sales in the US, thousands of TEs were shipped over from England.

=== Harry Ferguson Inc ===
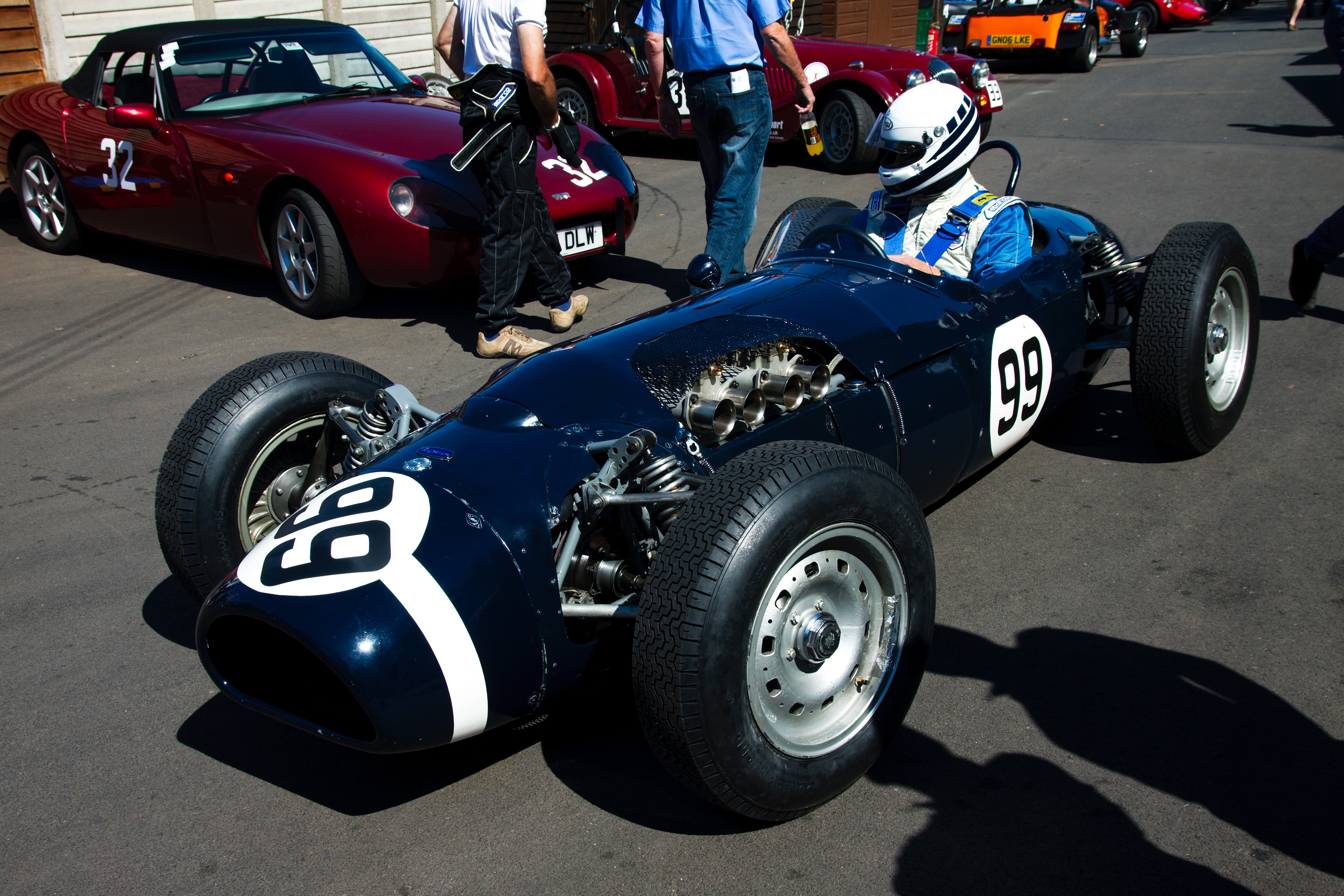
The Ferguson P99 racing car

Production of a US version, the TO20, started at a new plant, owned by Harry Ferguson Inc, in October 1948, leaving the UK plant to supply the rest of the world. Ferguson's research division went on to develop various cars and tractors, including the first Formula One four-wheel-drive car (see Ferguson Research Ltd.).

=== Four-wheel drive systems ===
The Ferguson Formula for all-wheel control was developed by Harry Ferguson Research Ltd, a company formed by Harry Ferguson when he acquired Dixon-Rolt Developments, a company set up by two racing drivers, Tony Rolt and Fred Dixon, whose aim was to make a super-safe family car with four-wheel drive. Rolt was made Managing Director and new premises were found in Redhill, Surrey, close to both Dixon’s and Rolt’s homes. Ferguson’s investment enabled the company to produce a series of research vehicles with a system that allowed the car to be run with four-wheel drive permanently engaged and automatically controlled whenever traction was lost and wheels began to slip, unlike such vehicles like Land Rover, the system of which could not be used on hard roads.

Ferguson intended these cars to be license-built by a major motor manufacturer, as his tractors had been. However, the industry proved impossible to convince and when Ferguson died in 1960, his son-in-law, Tony Sheldon took over the chairmanship and changed the company’s approach, developing instead four-wheel drive systems that manufacturers could fit in their standard production vehicles. This became known at first as the Ferguson Principle. To promote the ideas, the company built the Ferguson-Climax Grand Prix car, known as “P99” from its company project number. In the hands of Stirling Moss, it won the 1961 Oulton Park Gold Cup, becoming the only four-wheel drive grand prix car to win a race. The only motor company to adopt the Ferguson Principle was Jensen Motors and when it was fitted to the Jensen FF, the system’s name was changed to the Ferguson Formula.

In an attempt to persuade the American auto industry to adopt the Ferguson Formula, a number of Ford Mustangs were converted, but neither Ford nor any other US maker took it up. One Mustang can be seen in the Tampa Bay Auto Museum in Florida. A series of twenty-two Ford Zephyr V6 MkIV saloons were fitted with four-wheel drive for use by various British police forces and although they made a huge improvement to the handling of these large cars in all weathers, they were expensive to build and run.

When GKN took out a licence to build Ferguson Formula components at greatly reduced costs, it looked likely that a four-wheel drive Ford Capri might be made, but the plan fell through. Two other Grand Prix cars were built with Ferguson four-wheel drive. They were the BRM P67 of 1964 and the Matra MS84 of 1967, but the performance of both cars was inferior to their two-wheel drive counterparts. A number of cars were converted to four-wheel drive, including two Triumph Stags, two Triumph 2.5Pi estate cars and a Reliant Scimitar GTE, but the motor industry failed to show any interest.

In 1971, after more than twenty years of trying and not achieving the results that were expected, Tony Sheldon finally called a halt to the expense and closed Harry Ferguson Research.

Tony Rolt, however, felt the research was worth continuing, especially as a new Viscous Control unit had been developed that would reduce manufacturing costs, had been developed. With Tony Sheldon’s support, he formed FF Developments Ltd in 1971.

== Death ==
Ferguson died at his home at Lower Swell in 1960, as the result of a barbiturate overdose; the inquest was unable to conclude whether this had been accidental or not.

== Memorials and recognition ==
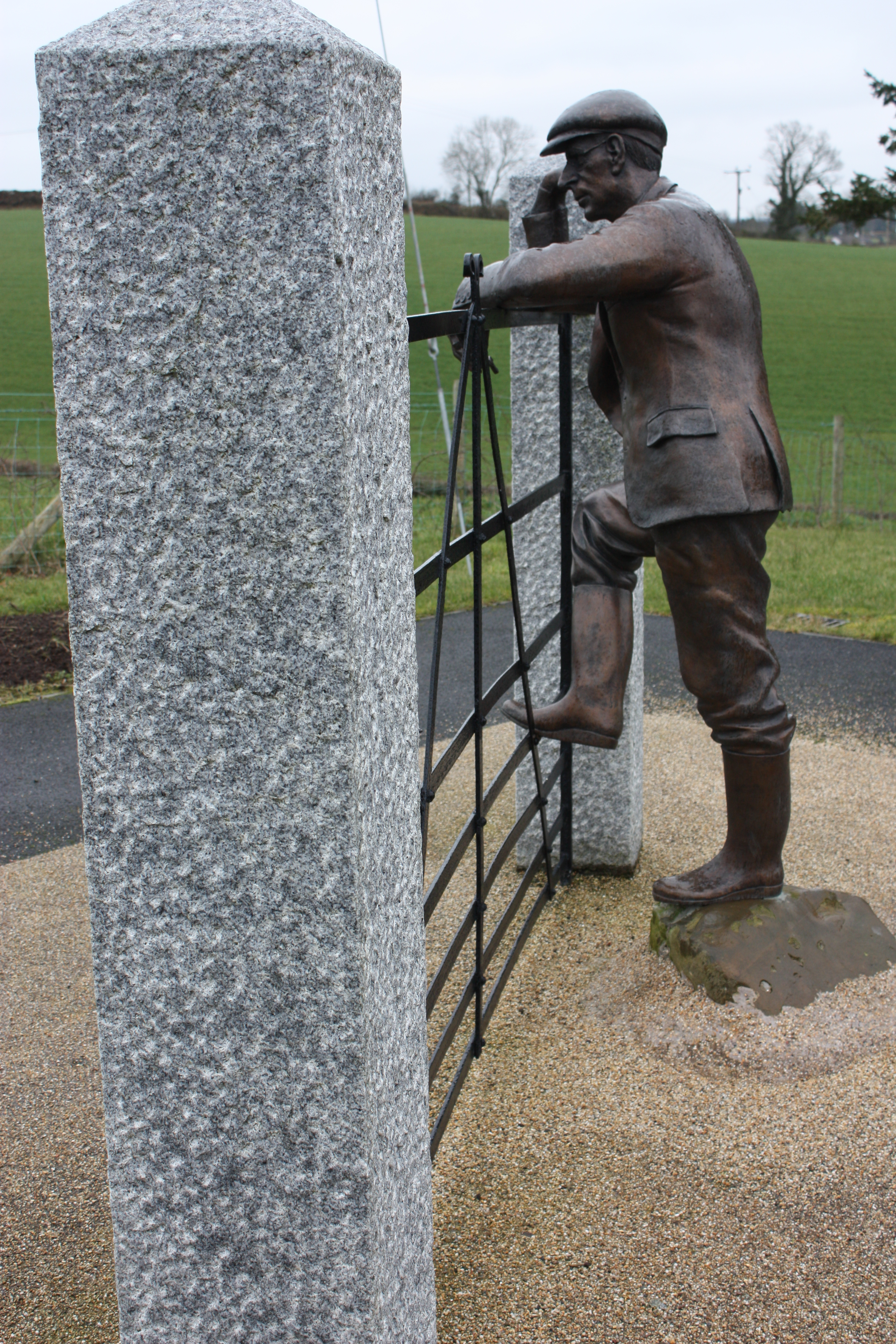
Harry Ferguson Sculpture, Harry Ferguson Memorial Garden, Growell, County Down

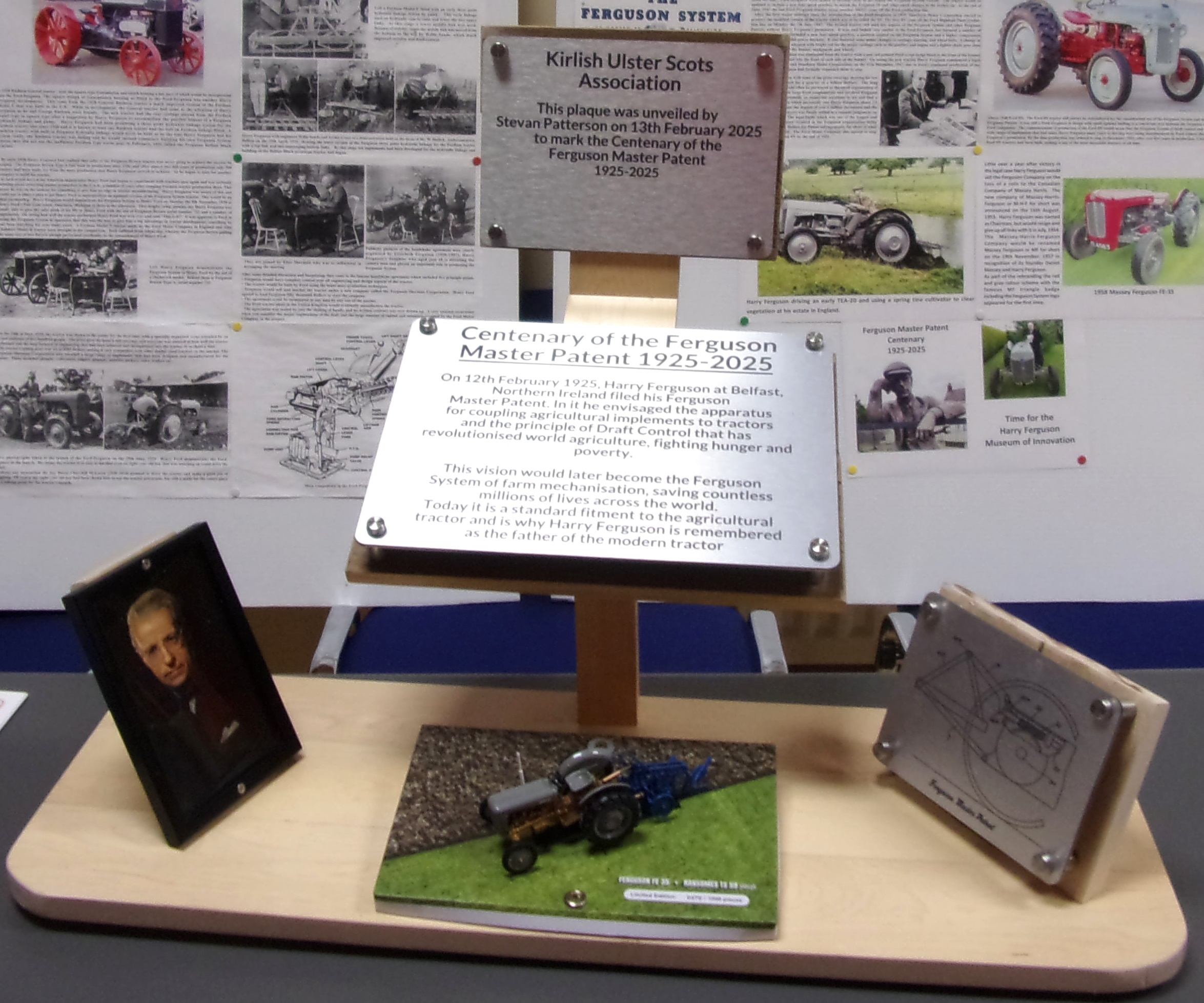
The Ferguson Master Patent Centenary Plaque 1925-2025

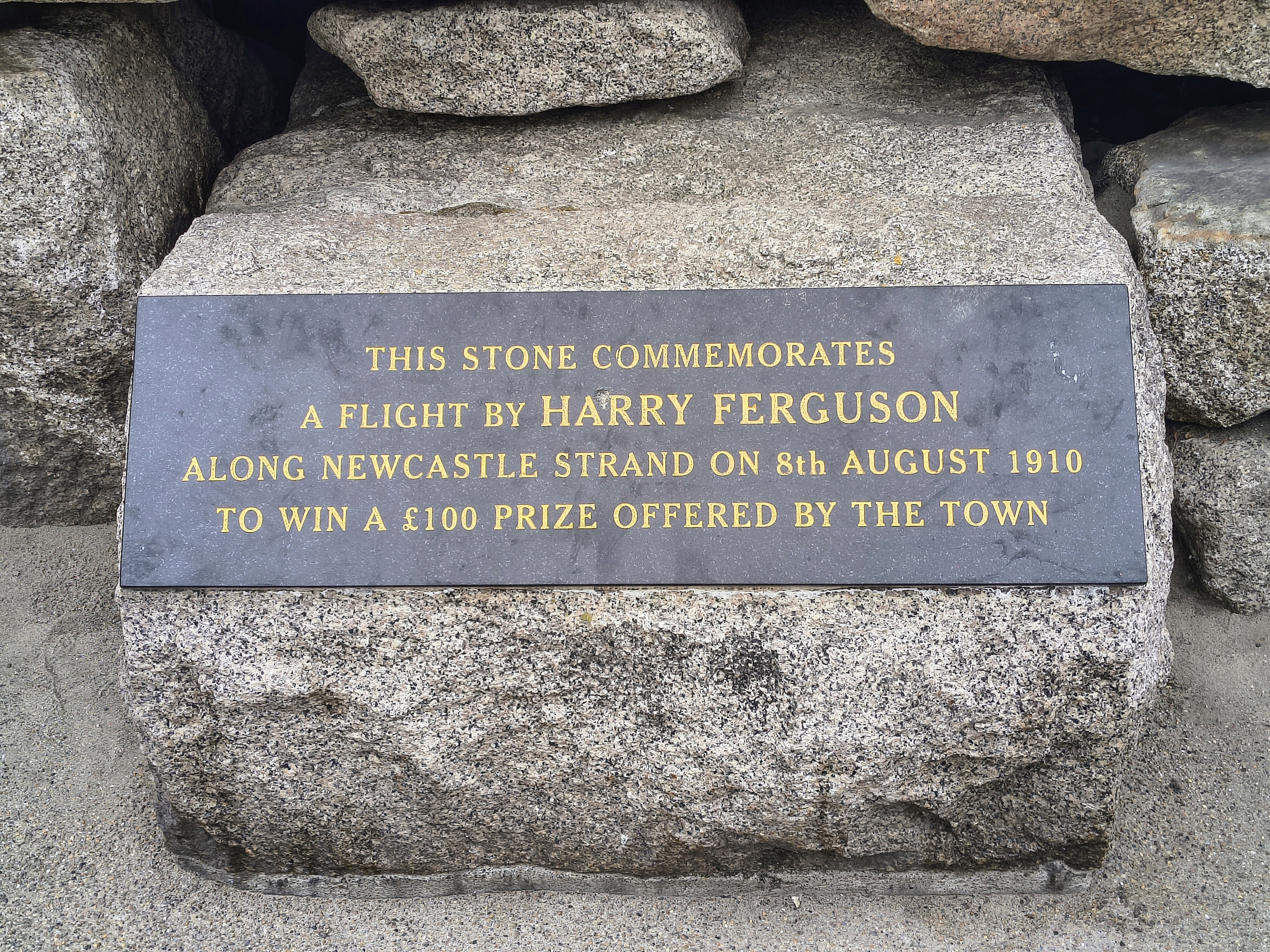
Stone commemorating Harry Ferguson's flight along Newcastle strand

A blue plaque commemorating Ferguson is mounted on the Ulster Bank building in Donegall Square, Belfast, the former site of his showroom. A granite memorial has been erected to Ferguson's pioneering flight on the North Promenade, Newcastle, and a full-scale replica of the Ferguson monoplane and an early Ferguson tractor and plough can be seen at the Ulster Folk and Transport Museum at Cultra.

In Northern Ireland, Danske Bank (formerly Northern Bank) issues its own £20 sterling notes which bear a portrait of Ferguson alongside a Ferguson tractor.

In 2008 the Harry Ferguson Memorial Gardens were officially opened, opposite the house he lived in, just outside Dromara, County Down. A life-size bronze sculpture of Ferguson by John Sherlock was erected in the garden depicting Ferguson leaning on a fence surveying the view. The gardens are open to the public.

The University of Ulster opened the Harry Ferguson Engineering Village (18 February 2004) on the Jordanstown campus in recognition of the contribution made by him to engineering and innovation in Ireland.

In 2025 a special plaque was unveiled to mark the centenary of the Ferguson Master Patent 1925-2025.

The Science Museum in London has on display one of Harry Ferguson's prototype tractors completed in 1935 as part of its history of agriculture exhibition, including information panels outlining his role in revolutionising the use of the farm tractor and its impact on the development of modern agriculture.

== See also ==
- Abbotswood, Gloucestershire, country house and estate purchased by Ferguson in 1946
- Ferguson Company

== Sources ==
- "Harry Ferguson: The Man and the Machine". Yesterday's Tractors.
- "They Came from Dromore: Harry Ferguson". Dromore. Raymond's County Down Website. Archived from the original on 25 July 2008.
- "Traction for Sale - the Story of Ferguson Formula Four-wheel Drive". Earlswood Press.
- Sorensen, Charles E. (1956), My Forty Years with Ford, New York: W. W. Norton, LCCN 56010854, OCLC 912748. Various republications, including ISBN 9780814332795.
