= Three-point hitch =

Hitch for attaching implements to tractors

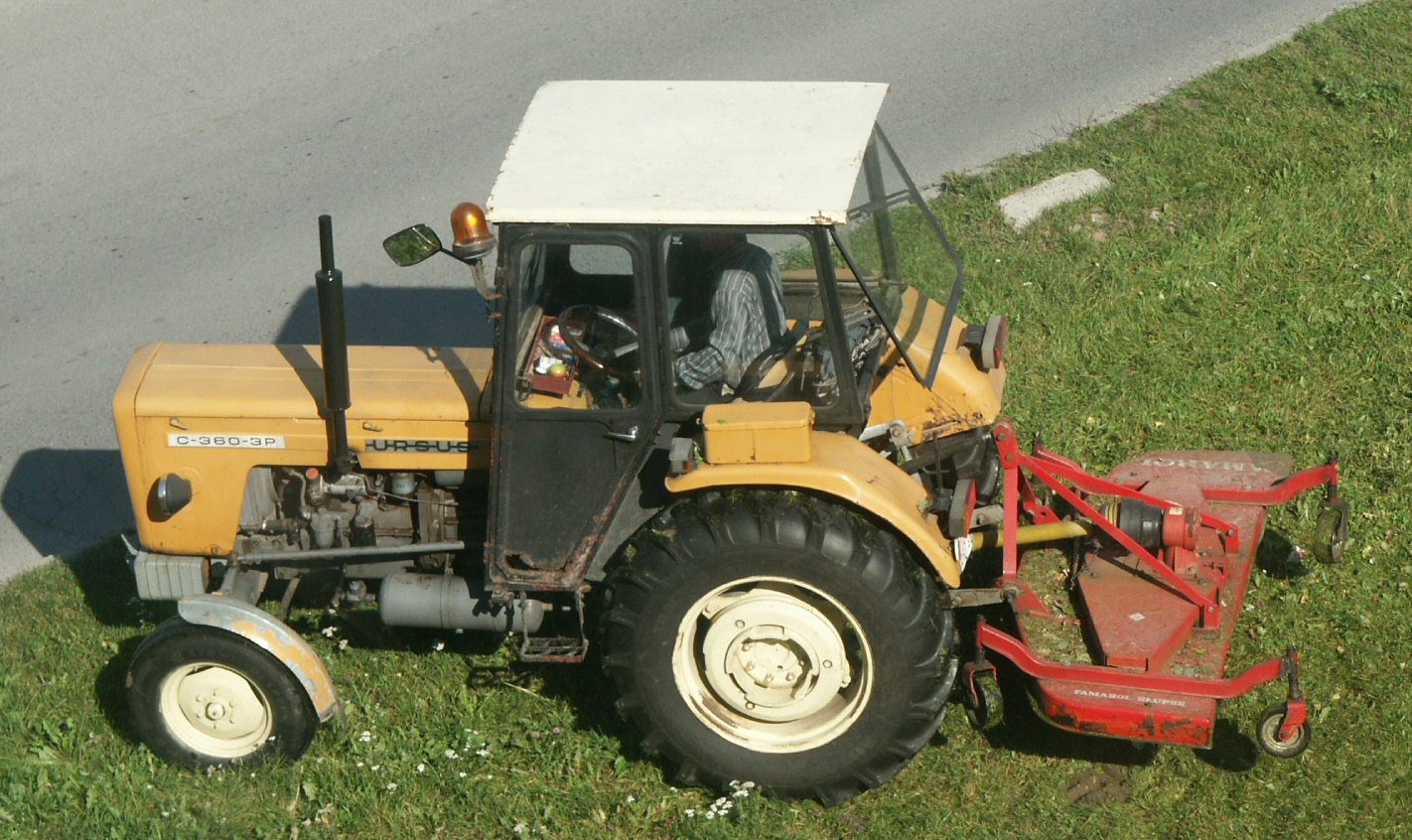
- An Ursus C-360 tractor and mowing deck, attached by a three-point linkage and driven by a jacketed PTO shaft
- Classification: Tow hitch
- Industry: Agriculture
- Inventor: Harry Ferguson
- Invented: 1926 (100 years ago)

The three-point hitch (British English: three-point linkage) is a widely used type of hitch for attaching plows and other implements to an agricultural or industrial tractor. The three points resemble either a triangle, or the letter A. In engineering terms, three-point attachment is the simplest and the only statically determinate way of rigidly joining two bodies.

A three-point hitch attaches the implement to the tractor so that the orientation of the implement is fixed with respect to the tractor and the arm position of the hitch. The tractor carries some or all of the weight of the implement. The other main mechanism for attaching a load is through a drawbar, a single-point, pivoting attachment where the implement or trailer varies in position with respect to the tractor.

The primary benefit of the three-point hitch system is to transfer the weight and resistance of an implement to the drive wheels of the tractor. This gives the tractor more usable traction than it would otherwise have, given the same power, weight, and fuel consumption. For example, when the Ford 9N introduced Harry Ferguson's three-point hitch design to American production-model tractors in 1939, it was a light and affordable row-crop tractor competing principally with tractors such as Farmalls that did not yet have three-point hitches. At 2,500 pounds (1.1 t), the 9N could plow more than 12 acres (4.9 hectares) in a normal day pulling two 14-inch (360 mm) plows, outperforming the tractive performance of the heavier and more expensive Farmall F-30 model. The hitch's utility and simplicity have since made it an industry standard.

== Components ==
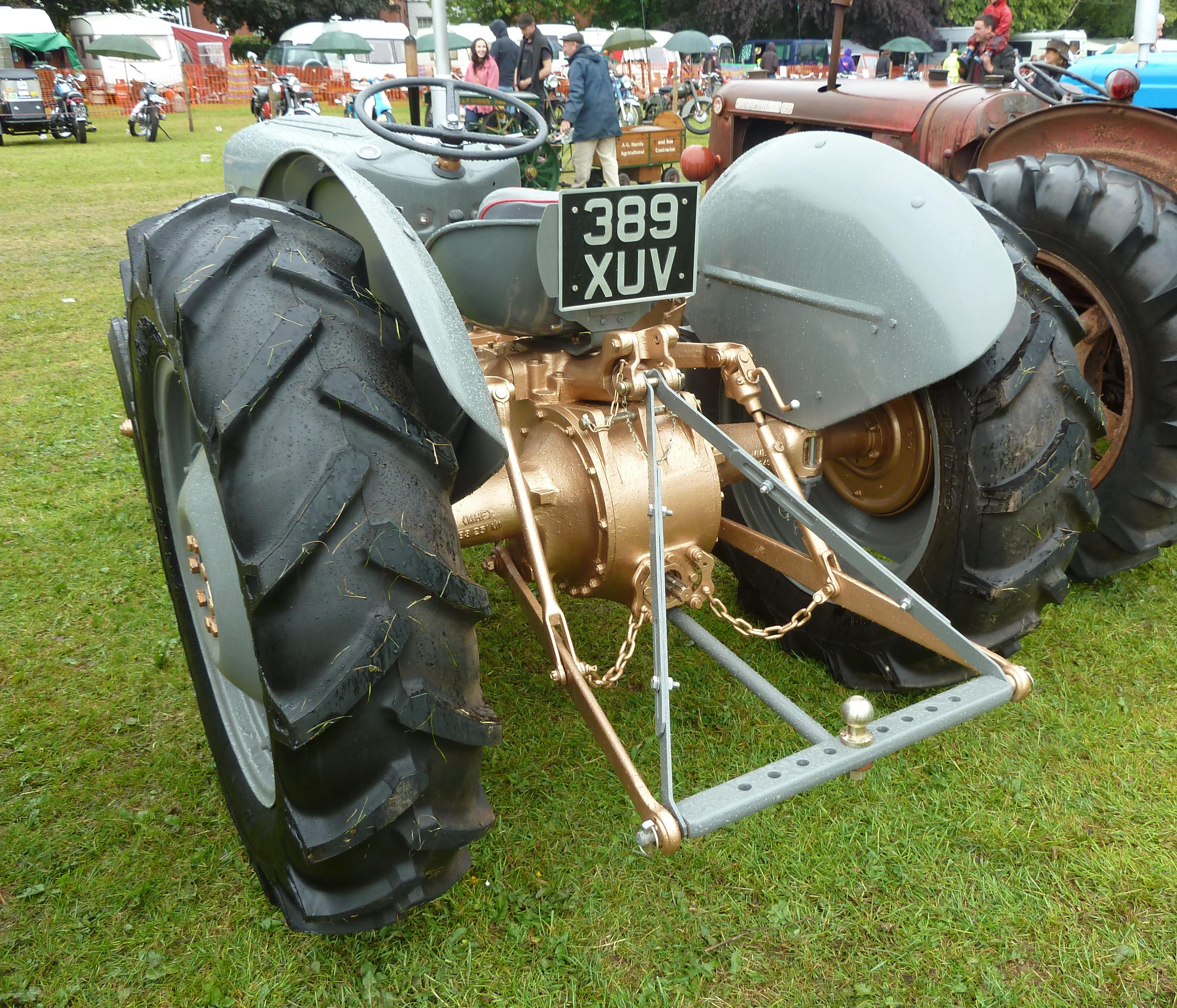
Three-point linkage on a Ferguson 35 tractor. The grey bars are a separate implement (a towing ball hitch) attached to the linkage at three points--both side and upper middle.

The three-point hitch is a system of components which include the tractor's hydraulics, attaching points, the lifting arms, and stabilizers.

Three-point hitches are composed of three movable arms. The two lower arms—the hitch lifting arms—are controlled by the hydraulic system, and provide lifting, lowering, and even tilting to the arms. The upper center arm—called the top link—is movable, but is usually not powered by the tractor's hydraulic system. Each arm has an attachment device to connect implements to the hitch.

Each hitch has attachment holes for attaching implements, and the implement has posts that fit through the holes. The implement is secured by placing a pin on the ends of the posts.

The hydraulic system is controlled by the operator, and usually a variety of settings are available. A draft control mechanism is often present in modern three-point hitch systems. In advanced systems the draft of the implement, the amount of force it is taking to pull it, is sensed on the top link and the hydraulic system automatically raises the arms slightly when the draft increases and lowers the arms when the draft decreases.

== Size categories ==
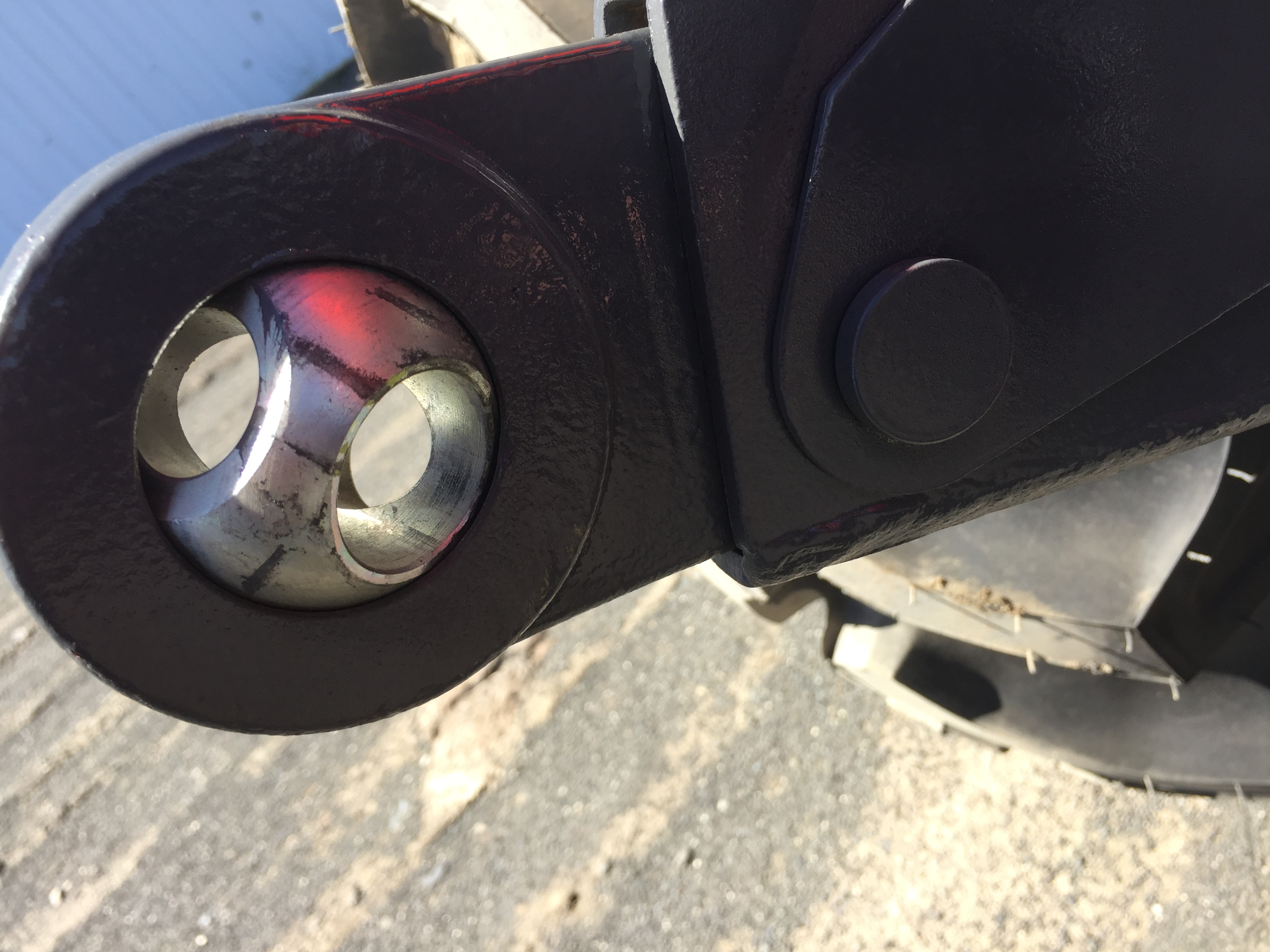
Adjustable three-point ball on lift arm. Ball may be rotated to fit either Category I or Category II implements

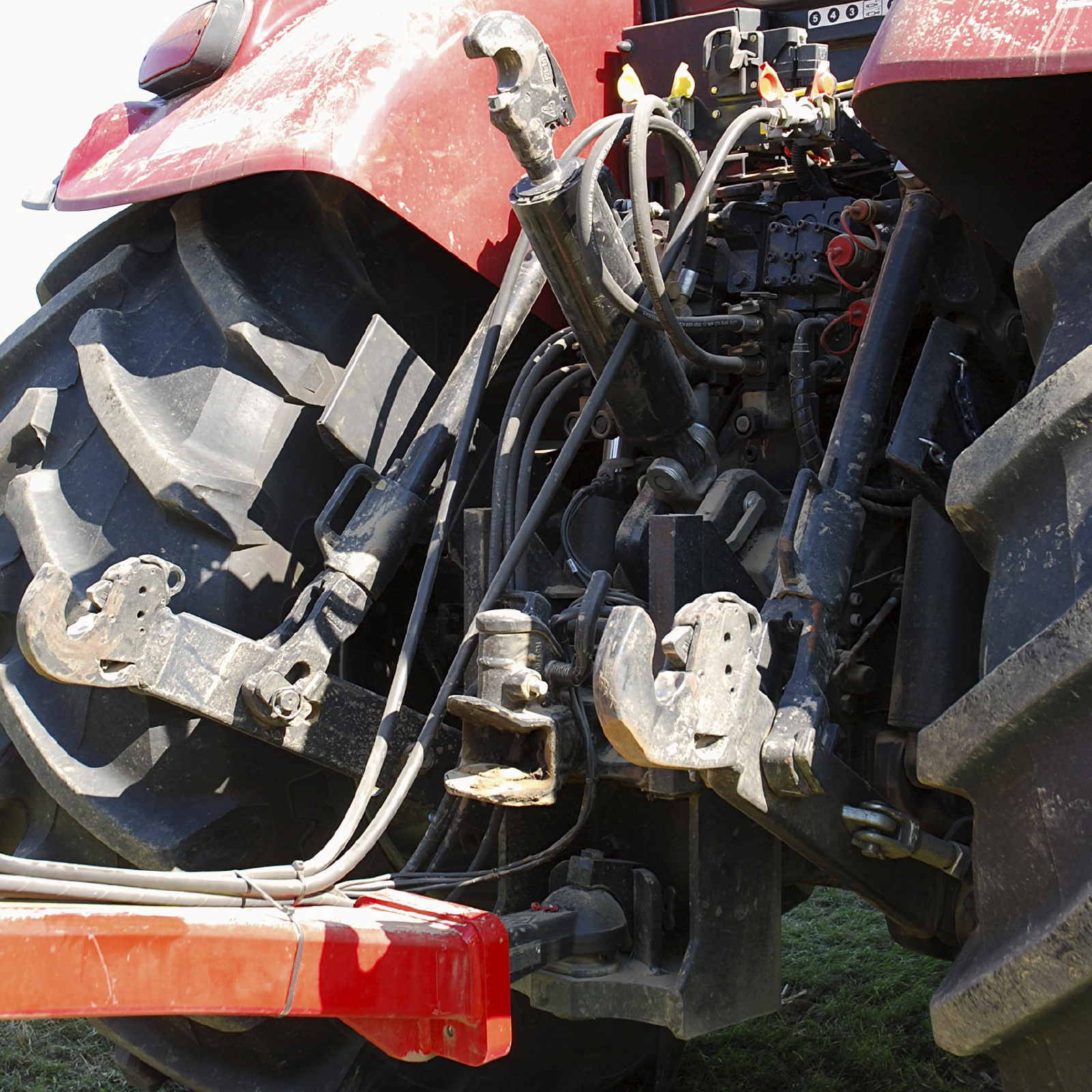
Rear three-point hitch of a Case IH tractor with implement attached by the drawbar

There are five different hitch sizes, called categories. The higher category hitches have sturdier lift arms and larger connector pins.

Category	Tractor power	Top link pin diameter (Note: Refers to implement end; tractor end not specified.)	Lift arm pin diameter	Lower hitch spacing
0	Up to 20 hp (15 kW)	5/8 in (16 mm)	5/8 in (16 mm)	20 in (510 mm)
1	20 to 45 hp (15 to 34 kW)	3/4 in (19 mm)	7/8 in (22 mm)	28 in (710 mm)
2	40 to 100 hp (30 to 75 kW)	1 in (25 mm)	1 1/8 in (29 mm)	34 in (860 mm)
3	80 to 225 hp (60 to 168 kW)	1 1/4 in (32 mm)	1 7/16 in (37 mm)	40 in (1,020 mm)
4	More than 180 hp (134 kW)	1 3/4 in (44 mm)	2 in (51 mm)	48 in (1,220 mm)

Narrow hitches (designated "N") utilize the pin size of a listed category and the spacing of a category one step lower. These variations are common in "quick hitches" and allow larger tractors to easily hook onto smaller utility implements.

== History ==
Before the 1940s, most hitching of farm implements to tractors was done simply with a drawbar, on the same principle as a modern tow hitch. The drawbar was a flat bar with holes in it, and the implements were trailers, with tongues that attached to the drawbar with a pin through a hole. The main reason why this was the default hitching idea is that it was the natural follow-on from the days of horse-drawn implements, which were towed as trailers by the horse or team (and often had an operator's seat). In fact, for decades during the mechanisation of agriculture in Europe and North America, as tractors gradually replaced horses in increasing degrees, existing implements from the horse era were often what the tractor pulled. Towing with a drawbar is a good, practical system for many purposes, and it has continued to be used even up to today, but the three-point hitch outperforms it in several ways (described below).

Harry Ferguson patented the three-point linkage for agricultural tractors in Britain in 1926. He had long been a champion of the importance of rigid attachment of the plough to the tractor. The idea did not originate with him, but he led its popularization over many years of development, explaining, and selling. During the decade of 1916 to 1926 he developed his ideas through various iterations, duplex and triplex, mechanical and hydraulic, to arrive at the patented form. During the next decade, he continued explaining and selling his hitches and implements and even produced his own model of tractor in cooperation with David Brown Ltd. via the Ferguson-Brown Company. The particular geometry of the linkage that attached the plough to the tractor enabled forces generated by the plough to be applied to the rear wheels of the tractor. This redirected the plough's resistance into downward force on the drive wheels, which enabled Ferguson's tractor to be much lighter and more manoeuvrable than earlier models of farm tractor with equivalent tractive force and traction. As a result his tractor could operate on soft ground and caused less compacting damage to the soil in comparison with other tractors of the time, and it could produce given amounts of work with less time and fuel. The hydraulically operated and controlled three-point hitch used the draft of the mounted tool to moderate the depth of the tool and therefore the load on the tractor (automatic depth control or draft control). In addition, the three-point hitch would prevent the tractor from flipping backwards on the drive wheels if the implement being dragged were to hit a rock or other immovable obstruction. Ferguson and his colleagues developed several innovations to this device (e.g., the hydraulic lift and depth control) which made the system workable, effective, and desirable. In 1938, after almost two decades of trying to sell Henry Ford on using Ferguson's system on tractors mass-produced by Ford, Ferguson finally convinced Ford. The American mass-market debut was via the Ford-Ferguson 9N in 1939.

The Ferguson system, as it was called, was not just an improved hitch but rather the hitch plus an entire line of implements purpose-built to make full use of its advantages. During the 1940s, it was so advantageous and popular that other manufacturers were compelled to come up with competing hitch improvements that could also be pitched as proprietary "systems" with at least some of the features of the Ferguson system (such as quick, easy hitching and unhitching, implement raising and lowering controlled from the tractor seat, and treating the tractor and implement as a unit rather than an articulated pair). Thus, International Harvester developed its Fast Hitch and began to advertise the notion of "farming with the Farmall system" and Allis-Chalmers introduced its Snap-Coupler which allowed the operator to hook and unhook implements without leaving the operator's seat. Likewise, JI Case developed its Eagle Hitch, and similar path was followed at John Deere. Some of these systems, with one-point or two-point hitching, were not well suited to lifting heavy implements. They also presented the problem of incompatibility between brands of tractors and implements, applying pressure toward vendor lock-in that many farmers resented. During the 1950s and 1960s, farmers often would have to purchase the same brand implements as their tractor to be able to hook up the implement correctly or to best effect. If a farmer needed to use a different brand of implement, an adaptation kit—which were typically clumsy, ill-fitting, or unsafe—was sometimes needed. The pressure toward vendor lock-in was a two-edged blade for the salespeople. It was an advantage in cases where it encouraged the sale of implements (e.g., a farmer decided to purchase not just a tractor but also new implements to replace his old ones, betting on increased productivity to make it worth the cost), but it was a disadvantage to the extent that farmers did not see the value in a special new hitch if they could not afford also to buy new implements to make full use of it or felt uneasy about buying new implements when they already had existing implements that were still usable. Ferguson often faced the latter problem in the UK and Ireland in the 1920s and 1930s, and it also applied to the competitors' proprietary hitches of the 1940s and 1950s.

In the 1960s, as patents on the technology expired, tractor and implement manufacturers agreed on the three-point hitch as the one standard, interchangeable, full-featured system to hitch implements to tractors. With the advent of nonproprietary status, the manufacturers were able to refine the system and create useful modifications. Now, nearly all manufacturers have adopted some standardised form of the modern three-point hitch system; many companies also offer safe adaptation kits for converting the non-standard hitch systems to the three-point hitch system.

== See also ==
- Overrunning clutch
- Power take-off

== General and cited references ==
- Pripps, Robert N.; Morland, Andrew (photographer) (1993), Farmall Tractors: History of International McCormick-Deering Farmall Tractors, Farm Tractor Color History Series, Osceola, WI, USA: MBI, ISBN 978-0-87938-763-1.
