= Massey Ferguson 35 =

Tractor

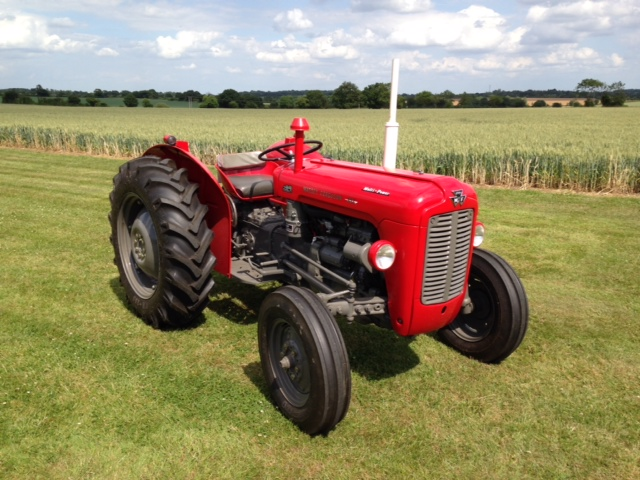
- A 1964 multi-power British MF35X
- Type: Agricultural, industrial and vineyard
- Manufacturer: Massey Ferguson
- Production: 1956–1964 (United Kingdom); 1955–1964 (United States); 2015–present (Kenya)
- Length: 117 inches (300 cm)
- Width: 64 inches (160 cm)
- Height: 54 inches (140 cm)
- Weight: 3,192 pounds (1,448 kg)
- Propulsion: Wheels
- Gross power: 44.5 horsepower (33.2 kW) (MF35X)
- Preceded by: Ferguson TE20 (UK); Ferguson TO30 (USA)
- Succeeded by: Massey Ferguson 135

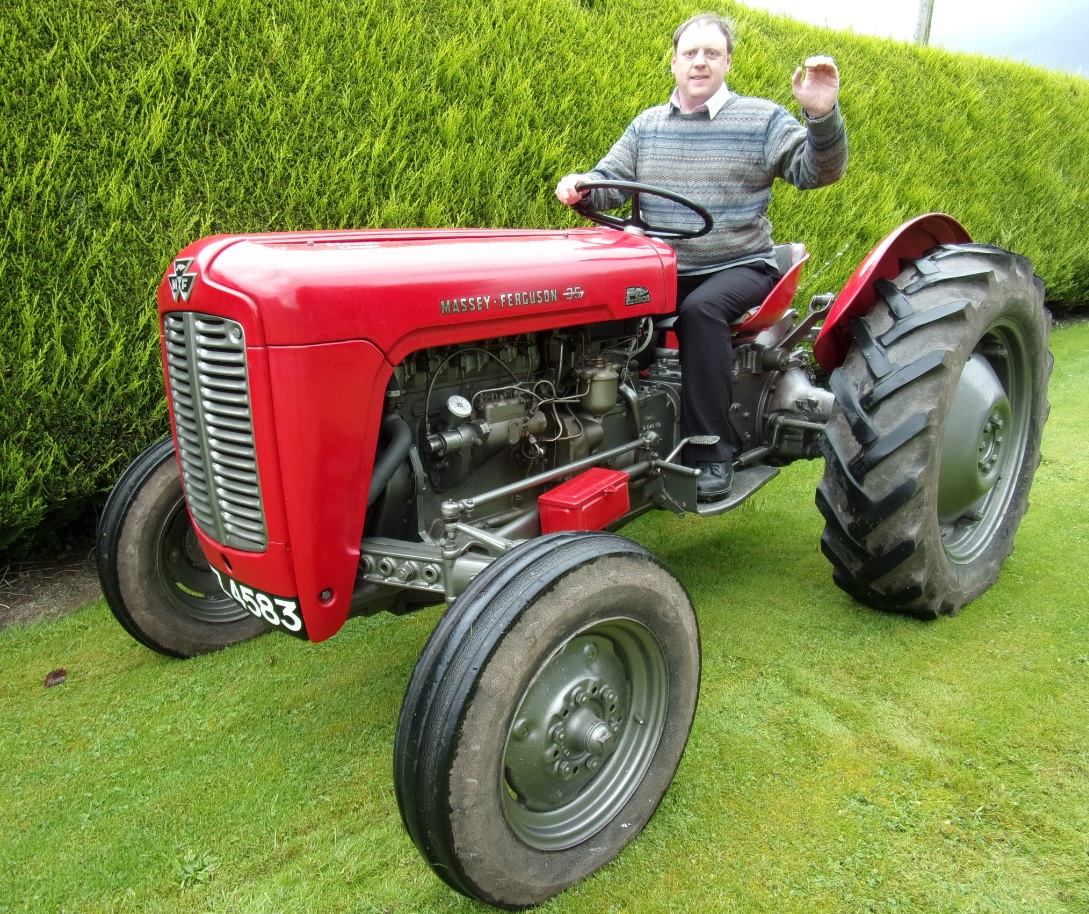
1958 Massey Ferguson FE-35 in typical period pose

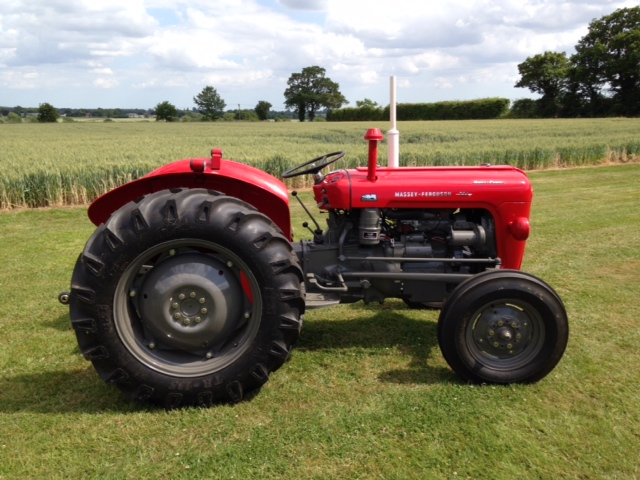
A 1964 multi-power British MF35X

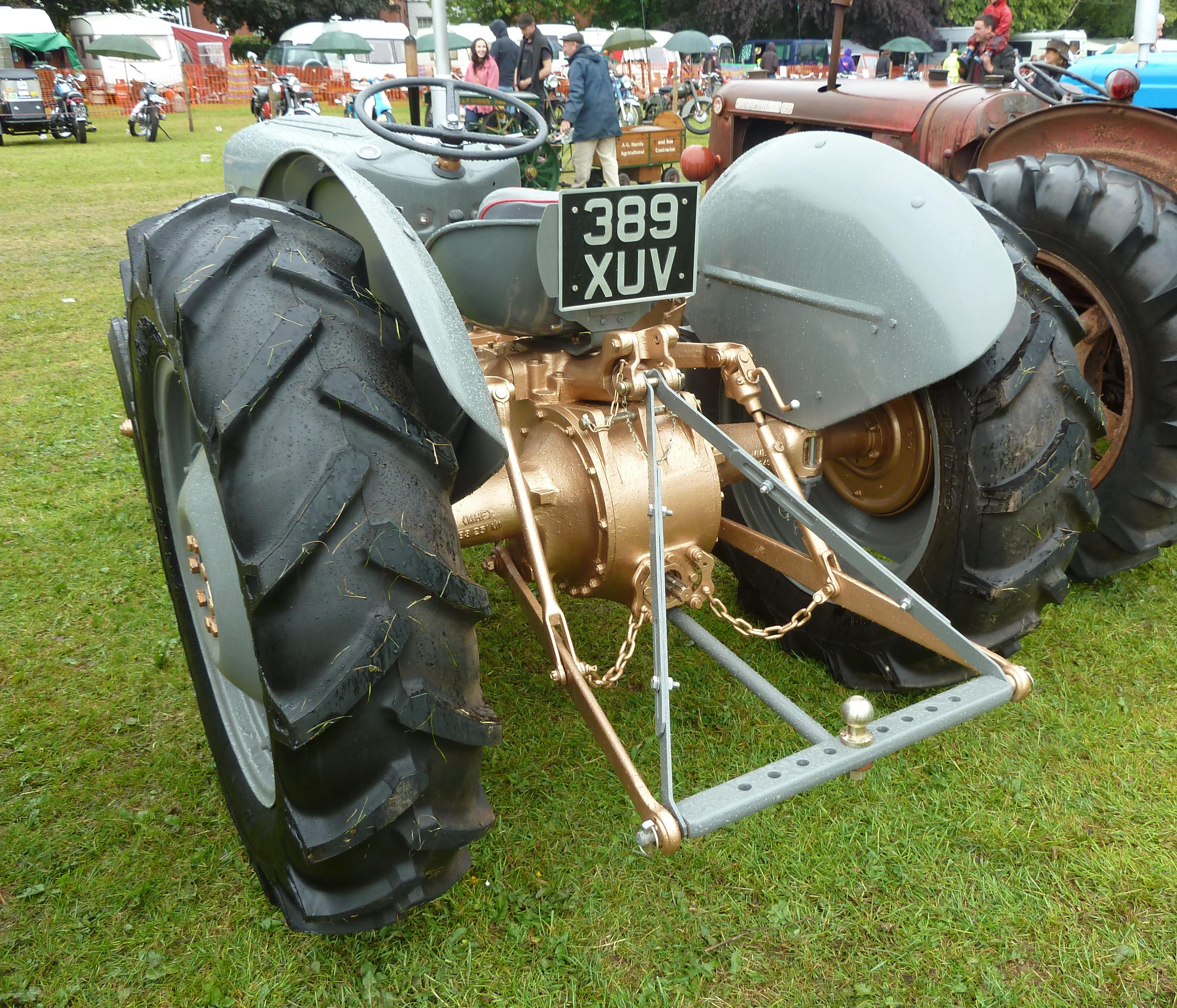
A British FE35 ("Gold Belly")

The Massey Ferguson 35 (MF35) is a tractor produced by Massey Ferguson.

== History ==
=== United States ===
In 1953 a team led by Hermann Klemm started developing a new model for Ferguson, known as the TO35, to replace the TO30. Klemm wrote to Harry Ferguson in July that year to tell him about the features of the TO35. Ferguson was unhappy with the project, and ordered Klemm to stop work. However, after another letter from Klemm, running to 23 pages, Ferguson changed his mind and allowed development to continue. Although Ferguson had merged with Massey-Harris to form Massey Ferguson in 1953, the TO35 was marketed under the Ferguson name. The new Ferguson 35 was launched in the United States on 5 January 1955, a year earlier than planned, following a decision made at a conference in San Antonio in March 1954.

It was initially available in two models; standard or deluxe, with a third (utility) added in 1956. Despite not being designed for industrial use, it became popular amongst industry users. The colour scheme was changed from all-grey to a beige shell and wheels and a grey body in May 1956. In December 1957 the scheme changed again when the TO35 was rebranded in the standard Massey Ferguson red and grey. However, the wording on the tractor continued to be "Ferguson" until February 1960.

Production ended in late 1964.

=== United Kingdom ===
In the United Kingdom, the MF35 was launched on 1 October 1956 at the Grosvenor House Hotel in London, and was originally marketed as the Ferguson 35 (FE35). Built at Massey Ferguson's Banner Lane factory in Coventry, the first FE35 (serial number 1001) had been produced on 27 August that year.

The FE35 was a successor to the Ferguson TE20, which ceased production in the same year. Whilst the TE20 had been an all-grey tractor (earning it the nickname Little Grey Fergie), the FE35 had a grey shell and wheels, but a bronze finish for the body, leading to it becoming known as the "Gold Belly". Three types were built; agricultural, industrial and vineyard, although only a small number of the latter were produced. The industrial model was designed for compliance with the Road Traffic Act 1947, including a driving mirror and a high-frequency horn.

In 1957, after 73,655 units had been produced, the tractor was rebadged as the MF35, and the colour scheme was changed to red and grey. In 1959 Massey Ferguson purchased Perkins Engines, and began using a new diesel Perkins engine in the MF35. De Luxe models had a dual clutch, allowing the user to disengage the rear wheels while keeping the power take-off and hydraulic pump engaged.

On 8 November 1962 the company launched the MF35X, which had an increased power output and the additional "multi-power" system, which allowed the driver to shift up or down a gear ratio without using the clutch. Although production in England reached over 45,000 units the following year, it ceased in 1964, when it was succeeded by the Massey Ferguson 135. Over its eight-year production run, 388,382 units were produced. Many are still used today on small farms.

The Banner Lane factory continued to supply kits to foreign manufacturers until 24 December 2002. By the time production ceased, 3,307,996 tractor or kits had been built at the factory. According to Michael Thorne, "it is not an exaggeration to say that there is no other tractor design in history that has contributed more to the feeding of the world."

=== Other countries ===
TAFE in India bought a licence to build MF35s in 1960 and continued manufacturing them until 2002. Yugoslavian firm Industry of Machinery and Tractors also bought a licence to build Massey Ferguson tractors, marketing the MF35 as the IMT533 and IMT539. In 2014 variants of the MF35 were still being built in India, Pakistan and Turkey. In 2015 Agco, owners of the Massey Ferguson brand, relaunched the MF35 in the East African market as the "People's tractor".
