= 2013 Calstock landslide =

Landslide in Cornwall, United Kingdom

Calstock Landslide
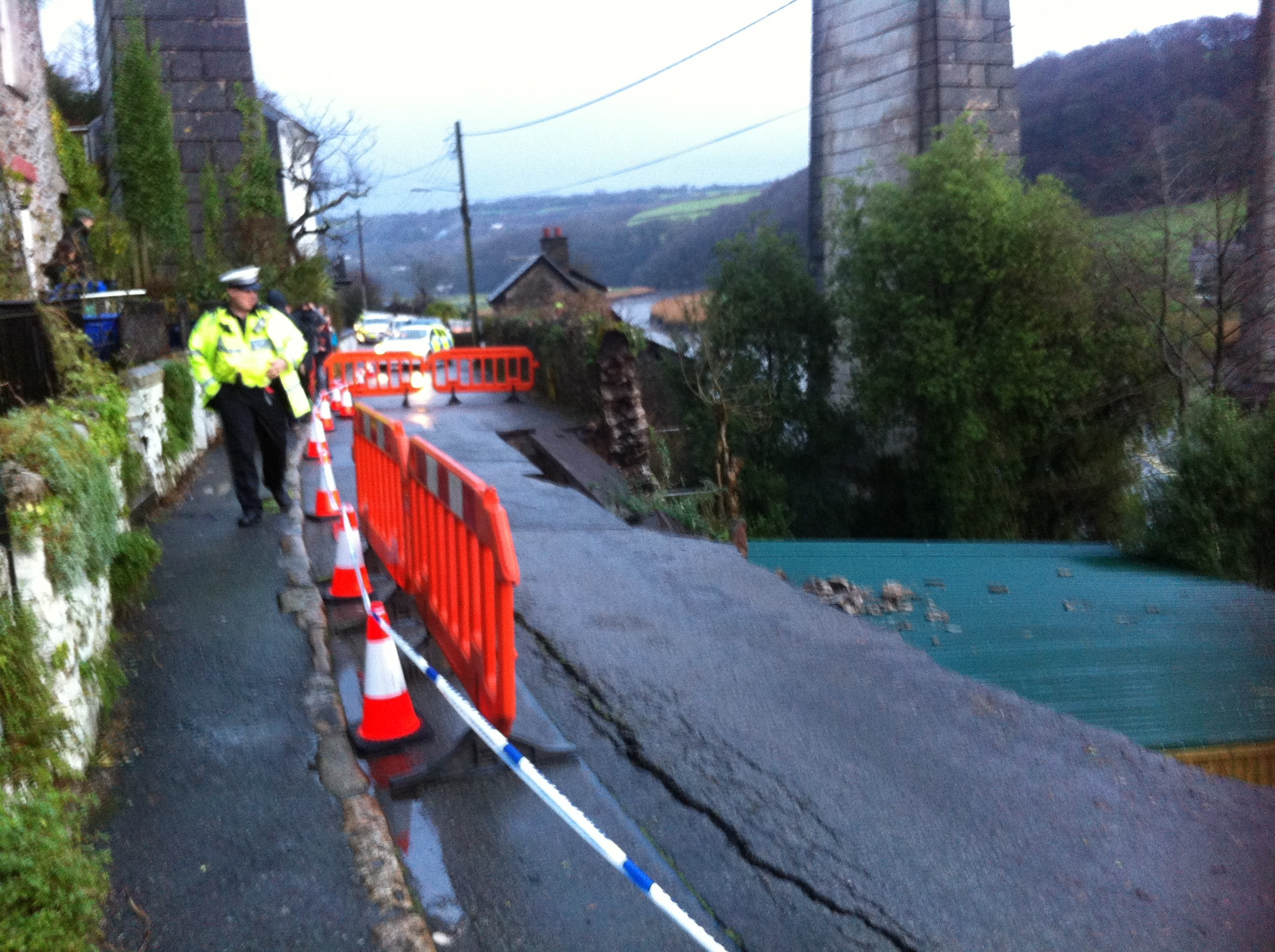
- Early Christmas morning 2013, road still collapsing.
- Date: 25 December 2013
- Location: Calstock; 50°29′49″N 4°12′36″W
- Also known as: C-Day; Operation Calstock
- Type: Landslide
- Cause: 2013–14 United Kingdom winter floods
- Organised by: Cornwall Council ∟ Calstock Parish Council; Royal Navy ∟ Royal Marines; 1st Assault Group
- Participants: Cllr Bert Biscoe DL; Cllr Dorothy Kirk BEM; Cdre Graeme Little OBE RN; Col Garth Manger OBE RM; Charles Southcott

On 25 December 2013, Christmas Day, a landslide occurred in the village of Calstock in the county of Cornwall, United Kingdom. The landslide, which hit late in the morning, was believed to have been caused by a burst of heavy rainfall and numerous village wells surrounding the landslide. The landslide collapsed the road of Lower Kelly, which was a vital and only road connection to the town of Calstock, trapping forty cars.

== Cause ==
This landslide took place next to five old village drinking wells. This water for centuries had eroded the foundations of the road since its 18th-century construction, then in a heavy burst of rainfall caused by the 2013–14 United Kingdom winter floods led to the collapse of the road over a 30 foot drop, to the river bank with the River Tamar. Over Christmas morning the road continued to collapse, the local fire service and police were called to the scene. Local residents were evacuated immediately, as it was feared that the landslide could also collapse the nearby Georgian terrace. It was feared that the foundations of Calstock Viaduct might also collapse and Tamar Valley Line services were cancelled until 28 December 2013.

== Management ==
On 30 December 2013, five days after the landslide, Calstock Parish Council held a local residents' meeting, chaired by Dorothy Kirk. At this meeting numerous proposals were made and rejected. As the meeting began to close a proposal was made by a local 120-month old boy, Charles Southcott. He proposed that the Royal Marines who were based nearby could rescue the trapped cars using landing crafts to ferry the trapped cars, as most children do, between the Calstock Boatyard slipway and Cotehele Quay slipway. Charles was also an acquaintance (ie: met once and harassed) of the then commander of the HMNB Devonport, Commodore Graeme Little, whom he had met the previous week at the Babcock Christmas Carol Service, held on Christmas Eve. Young Southcott then also presented the parish council with Commodore Little's telephone number and contact details. Asked whether he would consider a career in the armed forces, he responded 'No - I'd prefer to be a train driver'. The presenter exclaimed, 'I reject that motion'.

== Royal Marine rescue ==
Calstock Parish Council contacted Cmdre Little and it was arranged that the Royal Marine's 1st Assault Group would leave HMNB Devonport, travel up the River Tamar to Calstock on 15 January 2014 to ferry the forty cars over two days. The day was chosen because of the favourable neap tides.

Upon assessment and Charlie's recommendations the Royal Marines would land and cars could embark from Calstock Boat Yard and travel 1 mile down the River Tamar to Cotehele Quay, a National Trust property nearby, to disembark the cars. In total the Royal Marines provided four LCVP Mk5 and one Offshore Raiding Craft.

The Royal Navy is delighted to come to the aid of the civilian authorities

— Colonel Garth Manger

The slipway used at Calstock was constructed by the American Army in the Second World War to embark US Army troops into Landing craft bound for Utah Beach, as part of the Normandy Landings.

Calstock Primary School children, including Charlie Southcott, were given the day off to watch the unfolding military operation. The event was Calstock's largest peacetime military operation.

== Aftermath ==
After the Royal Marine rescue Cornwall Council began rebuilding the collapsed wall. This was done by constructing a tall wall of large cement block and then an exterior of natural stone, imitating the original design and in keeping with the rest of the unclasped wall. The road was reopened on 19 May 2014 and a village street party was held to celebrate. The road since then has been in constant use and remains structurally intact.

== Damaged property ==
The road had also collapsed onto a riverside shed and the shed was also rebuilt by Cornwall Council once the road was completed.

== Gallery ==
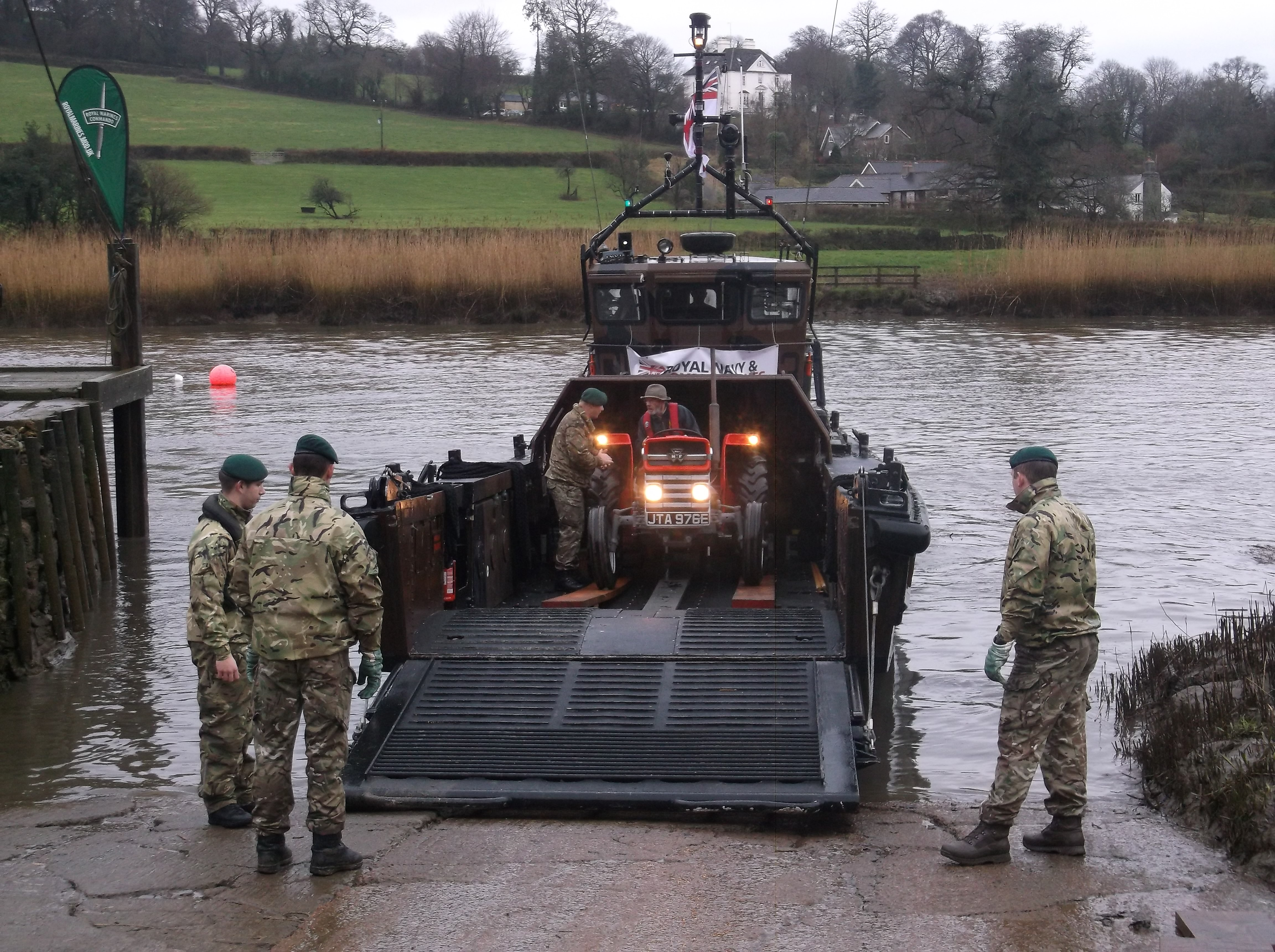
Calstock Boatyard Slipway, RM landing craft loading a Massey Ferguson 135 Tractor

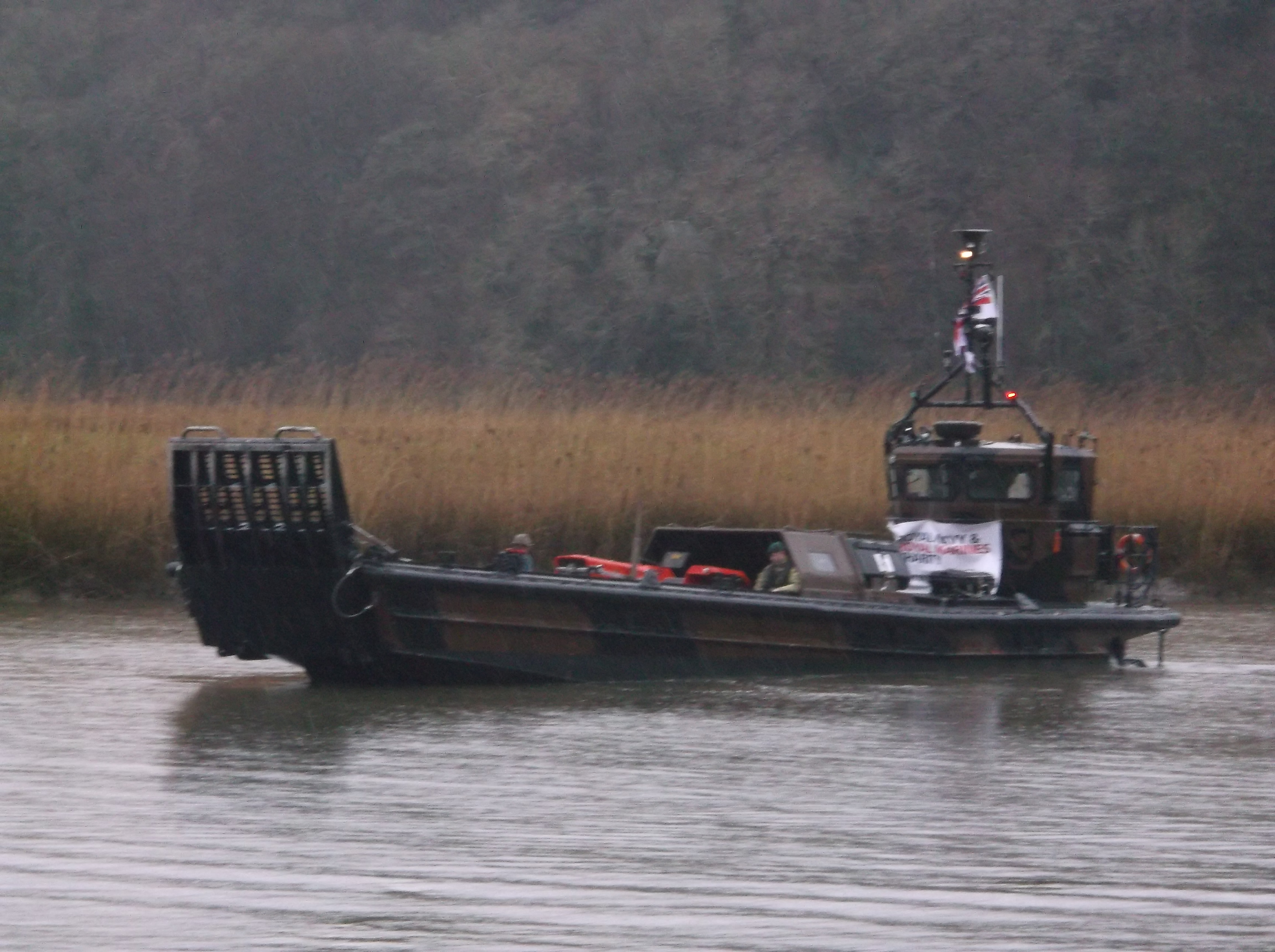
RM landing craft loaded with a Massey Ferguson 135 Tractor travelling down the River Tamar
