= Ferguson TE20 =

British agricultural tractor produced 1946–1956

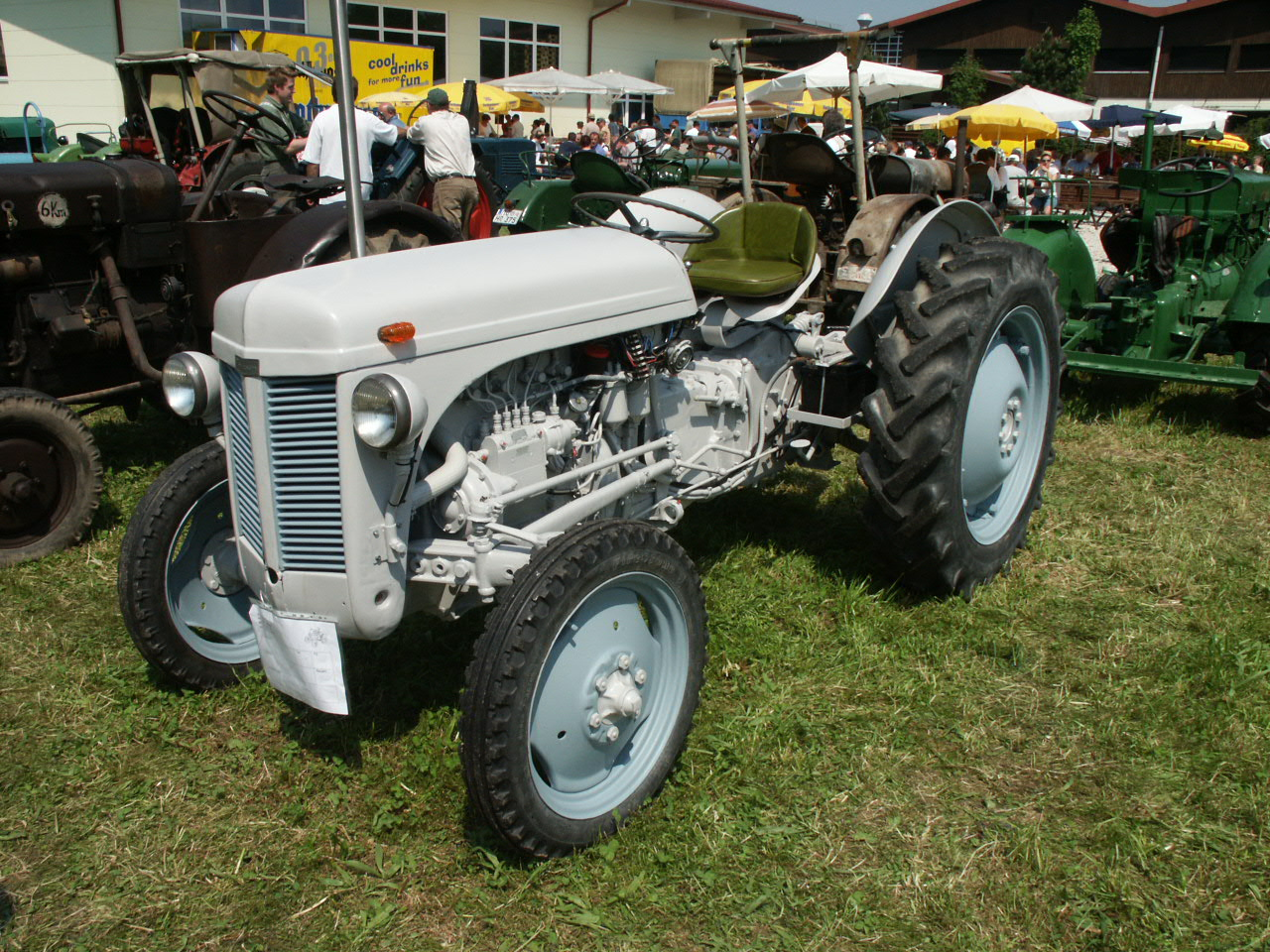
- 1955 Ferguson TEF
- Type: Agricultural tractor
- Manufacturer: Ferguson Company
- Production: 1946–1956
- Succeeded by: Ferguson FE35

The Ferguson TE20 is an agricultural tractor designed by Harry Ferguson. By far his most successful design, it was manufactured from 1946 until 1956, and was commonly known as the Little Grey Fergie. It marked a major advance in tractor design, distinguished by light weight, small size, manoeuvrability and versatility. The TE20 popularised Harry Ferguson's invention of the hydraulic three-point hitch system around the world, and the system quickly became an international standard for tractors of all makes and sizes that has remained to this day. The tractor played a large part in introducing widespread mechanised agriculture. In many parts of the world the TE20 was the first tractor to be affordable to the average farmer and was small and light enough to replace the draft horse and manual labour. Many TE20s remain in regular use in farming and other work and the model is also a popular collector's item for enthusiasts today.

== History ==
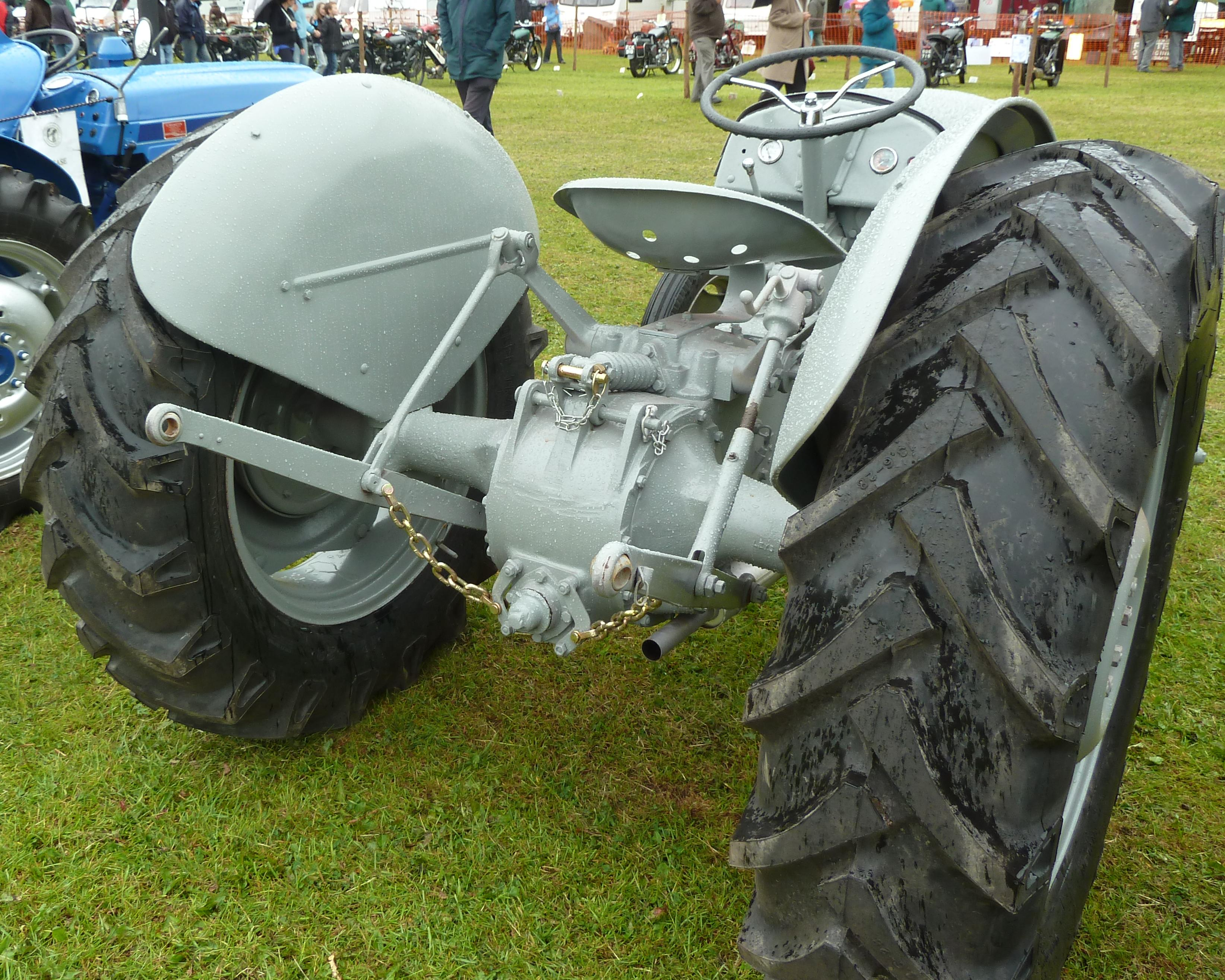
Three-point linkage on a TE20

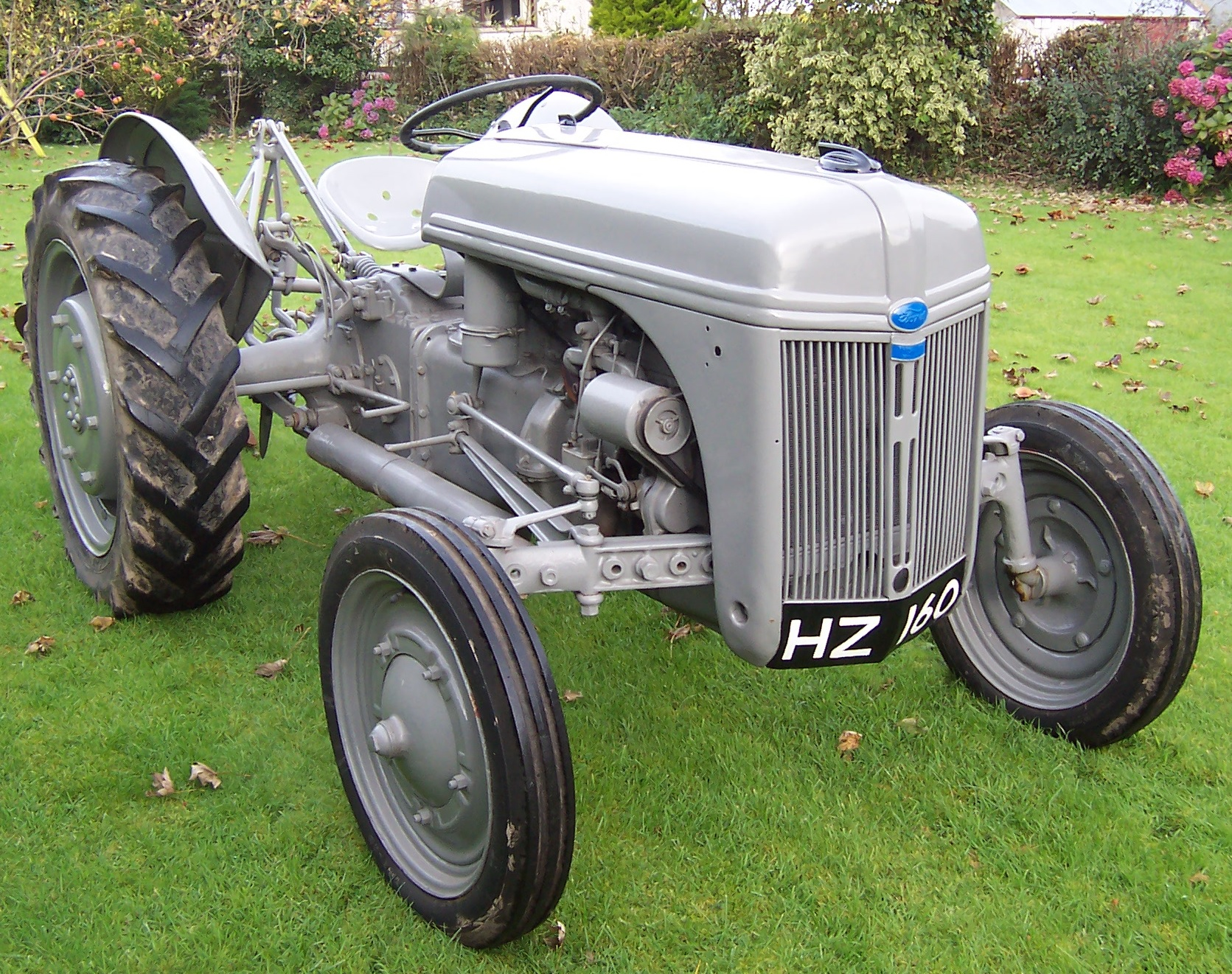
1944 Ford-Ferguson 2N

The model name came from Tractor, England 20 horsepower (not the true power delivered but from a tax formula based on engine size).

The TE range of Ferguson tractors was introduced in England in 1946, following 30 years of continuous development of the Ferguson System from 1916. The first work was to design a plough and linkage to integrate the tractor with its work in a manner that was an engineering whole. The automatic control system is now employed by almost all tractor manufacturers worldwide. A British patent was applied for by Harry Ferguson in 1925 and granted the following year.

By the early 1930s, the linkage design was finalised and is now adopted as international standard category I. Just one prototype Ferguson System tractor, known as the Ferguson Black, was built to further technical development and for demonstrating to potential manufacturers. During 1936, the first production Ferguson tractors were built in Huddersfield, Yorkshire, by the David Brown Company. That tractor, the Ferguson Model A, incorporated Harry Ferguson's "suction side" hydraulic control system, the key to solving sensitive automatic control of three-point mounted implements, patented on 5 February 1936 (patent no 470069). The combination of Ferguson's converging three-point hitch, patented on 3 July 1928 (patent no 320084) with his "suction side control" valve is the key to the success of all subsequent Ferguson and later Massey Ferguson "Ferguson System" tractors, the most important of which are the TE and TO 20 models. (It was the production of the Model A that led to the David Brown line of tractors in 1939).

In order to get volume production with lower costs, following a demonstration of his tractor before Henry Ford Senior in October 1938, Ferguson made a gentlemen's agreement with Ford, also referred to as the handshake agreement, to produce the Ferguson tractor in Detroit starting in mid-1939. Officially called the Ford Tractor Ferguson System they are more commonly known as the Ford-Ferguson. The first Ford-Ferguson 9N (for 1939 model N) tractors arrived in the United Kingdom in October 1939 and thousands would be imported to help with food production during the War. In 1942 due to material shortages after the USA entry into the War the model was updated to the 2N (for 1942 model N). About 300,000 of these tractors, known as "Ford-Fergusons", were produced up to 30 June 1947.

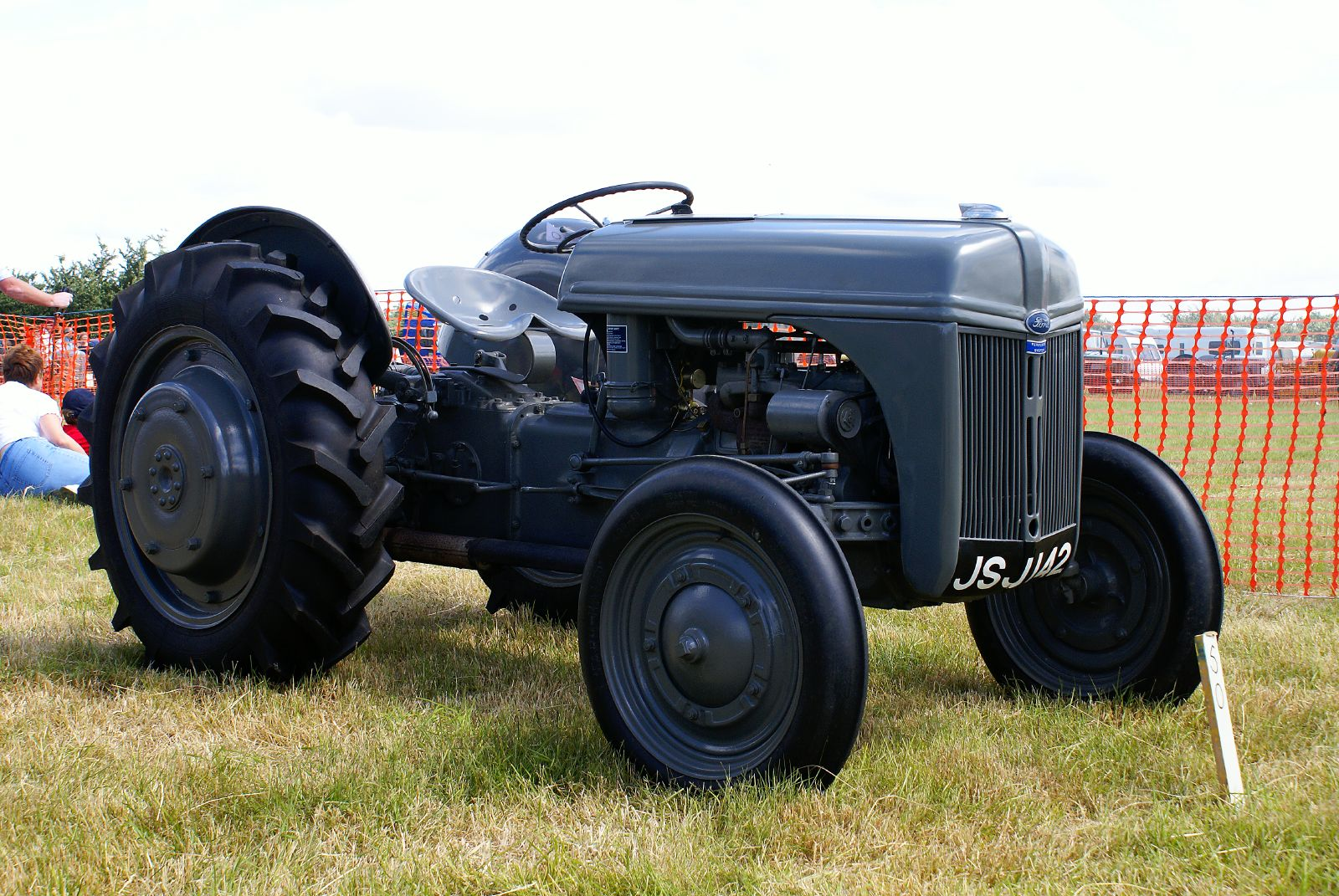
An English Ford-Ferguson in Suffolk Ford 9N

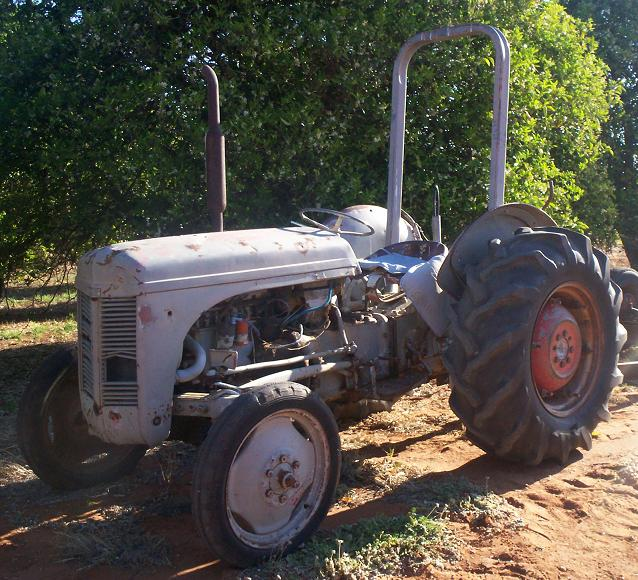
Ferguson tractor at an orange orchard at Palinyewah, New South Wales, Australia

During the war years, the Ferguson design team developed many improvements to both tractor and implements and started to make arrangements to manufacture in the United Kingdom. The agreement with Ford in 1938 was to include production at the Ford plant at Dagenham, Essex, but the UK Ford company would not do it. By 1945, Ferguson had made a manufacturing agreement with the Standard Motor Company of Coventry to produce a Ferguson tractor incorporating all their latest improvements and to be known as the TE20. As well as allowing Ferguson to get his tractor into full production, the deal was of great benefit to Standard, because the tractor would be built in its huge "shadow factory" which had been an aero engine plant during World War II but was then standing empty. Standard developed a new wet-liner engine for the tractor, and for Standard's road cars, such as the Vanguard.

Production started in the late summer of 1946, nearly a year before the last Ford Ferguson came off the line in Detroit in June 1947. The break with Ford left Harry Ferguson and his US company with implements to sell but no tractors. To make up the gap until the new Ferguson factory in Detroit started in October 1948, more than 25,000 Coventry-built TE20s were shipped to the US and Canada. The TO (Tractor Overseas) 20 was virtually the same as the TE20, with a Continental engine Z-126 fitted instead of the Standard engine.

At the time of its introduction the Ferguson three-point linkage was unique to the TE20, and to gain the full utility of the tractor the farmer also had to purchase specially designed implements to work with the tractor. Ferguson initially designed and manufactured a range of implements for the TE20 in-house, but as the tractor's popularity spread other manufacturers began designing their own machinery for the TE20 in agricultural, industrial, construction and horticultural applications. The idea that the three-point linkage made the tractor and its implement into a single mechanised unit was marketed as 'The Ferguson System', presenting a wholly new and entirely mechanised form of agriculture. By 1950 there were over 60 official Ferguson implements for the TE20, many of which had not been seen in mechanised tractor-mounted form before. As well as basic implements such as ploughs, harrows and cultivators, the range included a number of trailers and loaders, seed drills, a side-mounted baler, a very rare 'wraparound' combine harvester, a muck spreader, a sickle mower and a powered auger. With its power take-off, the tractor could also drive stand-alone equipment, such as pumps, milking machinery or circular saws, by belt or driveshaft.

Ferguson became well known for its effective and distinctive advertising, intended to demonstrate the abilities of the TE-20 tractor to farmers who previously had used only draft horses and had little experience with mechanised equipment. Public demonstrations of Ferguson tractors and implements were held throughout rural Britain towards the end of the harvest season. A typical demonstration involved fencing off an area 27 by 20 ft (8.2 by 6.1 m) and using a cultivator-equipped TE-20 to till the complete area - such an area was too small to be worked by a horse or a drawbar-equipped tractor of the time. Advertising also emphasised that in the 'Ferguson System' the tractor was not merely a replacement for the horse but, via its linkage and shaft-drive power take-off, it could mechanise dozens of agricultural tasks previously performed either by separate machines, unwieldy drawbar-mounted trailed equipment, or manual labour.

The TE and TO 20 tractors were so revolutionary that Ferguson set up a training school in the grounds of Stoneleigh Abbey, close to the Banner Lane factory. There, Ferguson dealers, salesmen and engineers were trained on the new machines they would be working on, and courses were also run for farmers to learn how to most effectively operate the tractors and the various implements.

Coventry production up to 1956 was 517,651 units, with about 66% being exported, mainly to Continental Europe and the British Empire, but to many other countries as well. To the above figure must be added TO production at Ferguson Park, Detroit. Including all 'Ferguson System' tractors from May 1936 to July 1956 brings the figure to approximately 1 million. Between 1953 and 1957, over 37,000 TE20 tractors were assembled in Saint-Denis near Paris by a joint venture between the Standard Motor Company and Automobiles Hotchkiss. Additionally, in 1957 and 1958, Standard-Hotchkiss built nearly 29,000 of the FF30; introduced in January 1957, this version had 100 percent French parts content, a sprung seat, a red-painted engine and chassis, and power was up to 30 hp (22 kW). The FF30 was nicknamed Ventre Rouge ("Red Belly") in France. Local parts content had been gradually increased, for instance, the engines began to be locally assembled in 1955.

Harry Ferguson merged his worldwide companies with Massey-Harris of Toronto in July 1953, three years before TE and TO20 production ended, hence the change of name on the serial plate to 'Massey-Harris-Ferguson'. The Ferguson 35 replaced the old line in the US in 1955 and the TE20 in the UK in 1956; production in the UK starting in September of that year following re-tooling of the factory. Harry Ferguson remained Chairman of Massey Harris Ferguson until 1957, when he left over an argument over the Ferguson TE60 or LTX project as it is known.

Harry Ferguson died on 25 October 1960 at his home (Abbotswood, Stow on the Wold), due to a barbiturate overdose; it was never established if it was deliberate or not.

== Engines ==
The engine was the Standard wet liner inline-four engine. Dimensions were:

- Petrol engine, 80 mm bore × 92 mm stroke, capacity 1,850 cc, compression ratio 5.77:1
- Petrol-paraffin engine, 85 mm bore × 92 mm stroke, capacity 2,088 cc, compression ratio 4.5:1

The larger capacity of the petrol-paraffin engine was to compensate for the power reduction resulting from the low compression ratio. Newer versions of the petrol only engine had a 85 mm bore as well.

== Variants ==
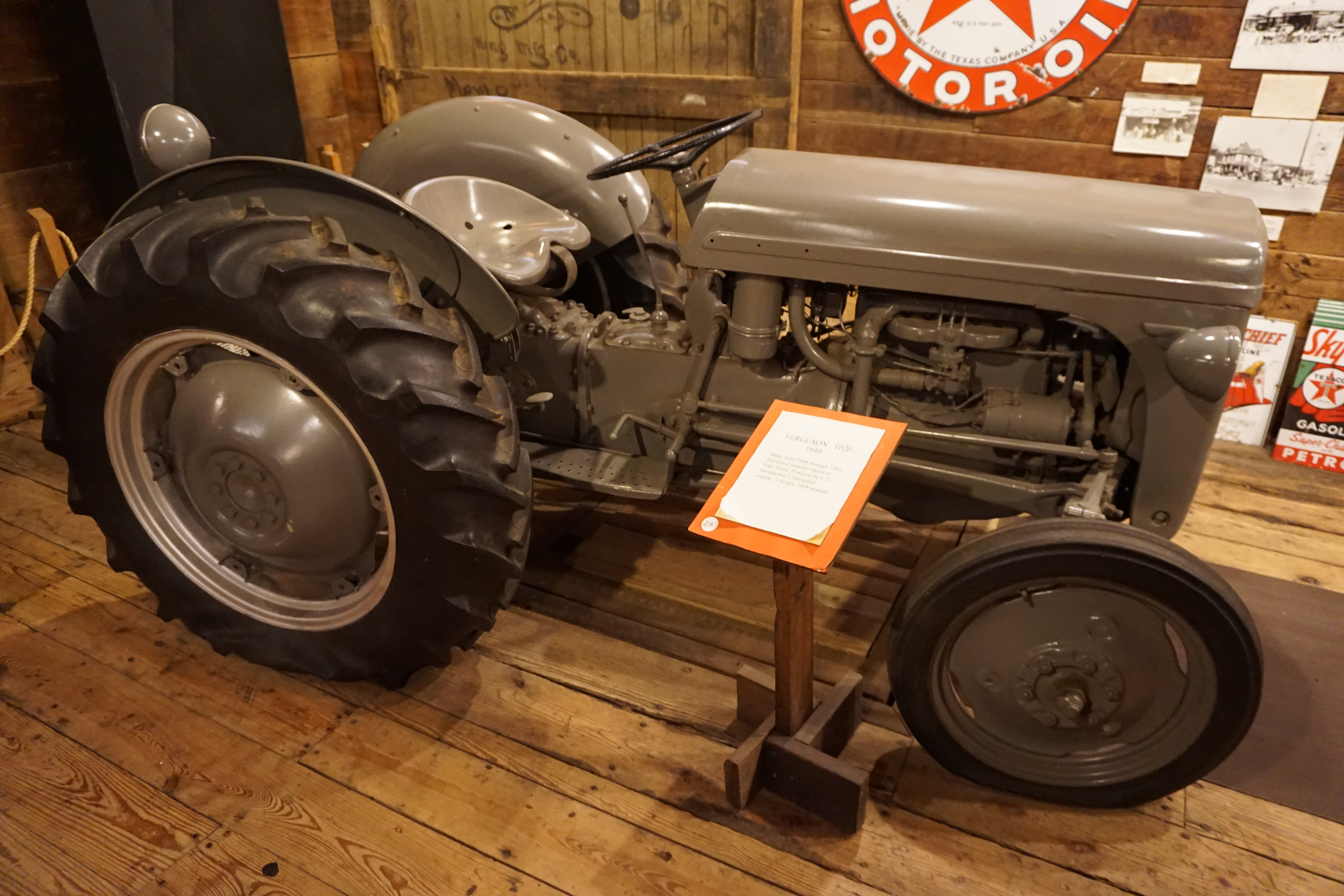
A 1949 Ferguson TO20 on display at the Northeast Texas Rural Heritage Center and Museum in August 2015

The first TE20s ran on petrol until 1949 when the TVO tractor was launched incorporating the standard engine as early TE20s used a continental Z-120. There were later versions that ran on tractor vapourising oil (TVO), sometimes called petrol-paraffin or power kerosene. Some were converted in the UK to use a 3-cylinder Perkins diesel engine.

TE stood for Tractor England
TO stood for Tractor Overseas
FF stood for Ferguson France

Between 1948 and 1951, the TO20 with a Continental engine was built in Detroit, Michigan. These were built with the Z120 engines. TO30s were also built in Michigan with Z-129 engines. Production ceased in 1954.

Models and production years, Standard built:

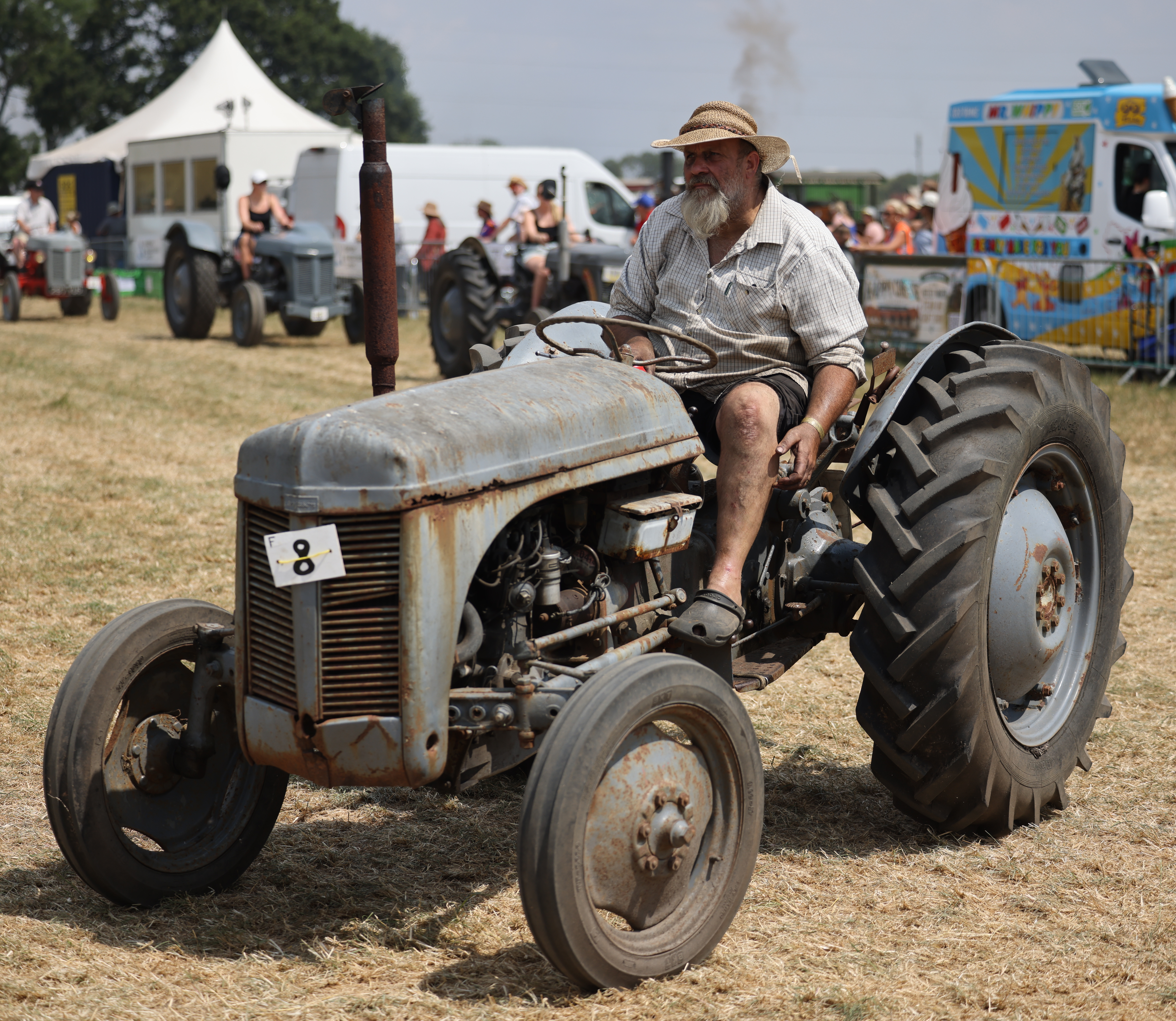
Ferguson Ted 20 1955 tractor

- TE-20 Continental Z-120 petrol engine 1946–48
- TEA-20 Standard Motor Company petrol engine 1947–56
- TEB-20 Continental Z-120 petrol engine – Narrow wheelbase 1946–48
- TEC-20 Standard 20S petrol – Narrow 1948–56
- TED-20 TVO Standard 20S TVO engine 1949–56
- TEE-20 TVO – Narrow 1949–56
- TEF-20 diesel 1951–56
- TEH-20 lamp oil engine 1950–56
- TEJ-20 lamp oil engine – Narrow 1950–56
- TEK-20 petrol – Vineyard 1952–56
- TEL-20 TVO – Vineyard 1952–56
- TEM-20 lamp oil – Vineyard 1952–56
- TEP-20 petrol – Industrial 1952–56
- TER-20 TVO – Industrial 1952–56
- TES-20 lamp oil – Industrial 1952–56
- TET-20 Diesel – Industrial 1952–56
- TEY-20 Perkins P3 (TA) Diesel – conversion 1955–56

Models and production years, Detroit built:

- TO-20 Continental Z-120 petrol engine 1948–51
- TO-30 Continental Z-129 petrol engine 1951–54

Models and production years, Hotchkiss-built (Paris):

- TEA-20 Standard Motor Company petrol engine 1953–57
- TEC-20 Standard 20S petrol – Narrow, 195x–57
- TEF-20 Standard 23C diesel 1953–57
- TEG-20 Standard 23C diesel – Narrow, 1953–57
- TEK-20 petrol – Vineyard, 1953–57
- TEN-20 Standard 23C diesel – Vineyard, 1953–57
- FF-30; 100% French parts content, red-painted engine, "Ventre Rouge" – 1957–58
  - Diesel: FF-30 DS (standard), DE (Etroit, narrow), DV (Vigneron, vineyard)
  - Petrol: FF-30 GS (standard), GE (narrow), GV (vineyard)

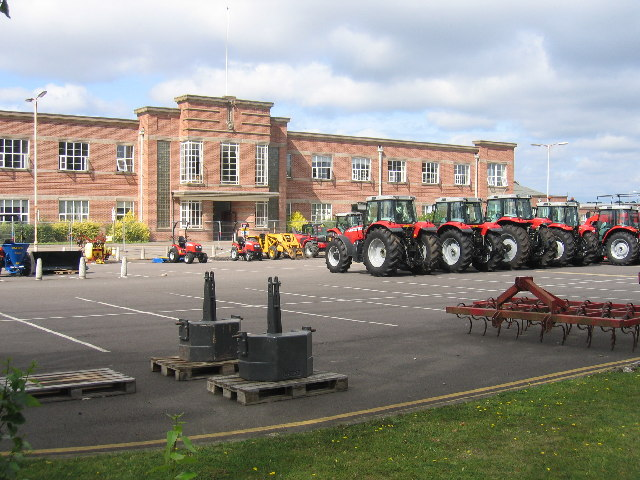
Massey Ferguson, Banner Lane, Coventry. One of the car parks at the front of the site was (2005) still used as a demonstration area for equipment carrying the Massey Ferguson brand, although it is no longer made on this site

517,651 TE20 tractors of all models were built at Banner Lane, Coventry. In mid-1953 Ferguson merged with Massey-Harris to become Massey-Harris-Ferguson. The new company continued both Massey Harris and Ferguson brands until December 1957, when it became Massey Ferguson. The new FE35 was introduced in October 1956 in grey and gold livery and became the red and grey MF35 at the Smithfield Show in December 1957.

== Ferguson 28 ==
The colloquial term "Ferguson 28" is sometimes used in Australia and New Zealand for later models of the TE-20 including the petrol TEA-20 and diesel TEF-20. "Ferguson 28" has never been an official tractor model designation. Initially the TE20 had the 'Continental' Z120 23HP engine, as did the Detroit-built TO20 introduced a year later. The 80 mm bore 'Standard' petrol engine was phased in during mid-1947 as the TEA-20, approximately 3,000 of the 20,500 tractors built to 31 December 1947 being TEA-20s. Subsequent to the introduction of the 85 mm bore TED-20 in April 1949, the petrol engine was also made with an 85 mm bore, which increased its power to just over 28 hp. The term "Fergie 28" refers to the nominal horsepower of the later range of tractors. To benefit from the reputation of the later models in the used tractor market, the 23HP TE-20 is often advertised simply as TE-20; only very rarely is it referred to in Australia as a "Ferguson 23". In North America the 'Standard' petrol-engined TEA-20s with the 85 mm bore were known and advertised as TE-2085s.

== Famous Fergies ==
There is a monument in Wentworth at the junction of the Darling and Murray Rivers in Australia commemorating the time in 1956 when both rivers flooded and a fleet of little grey Fergies was used to build levee banks to save the town.

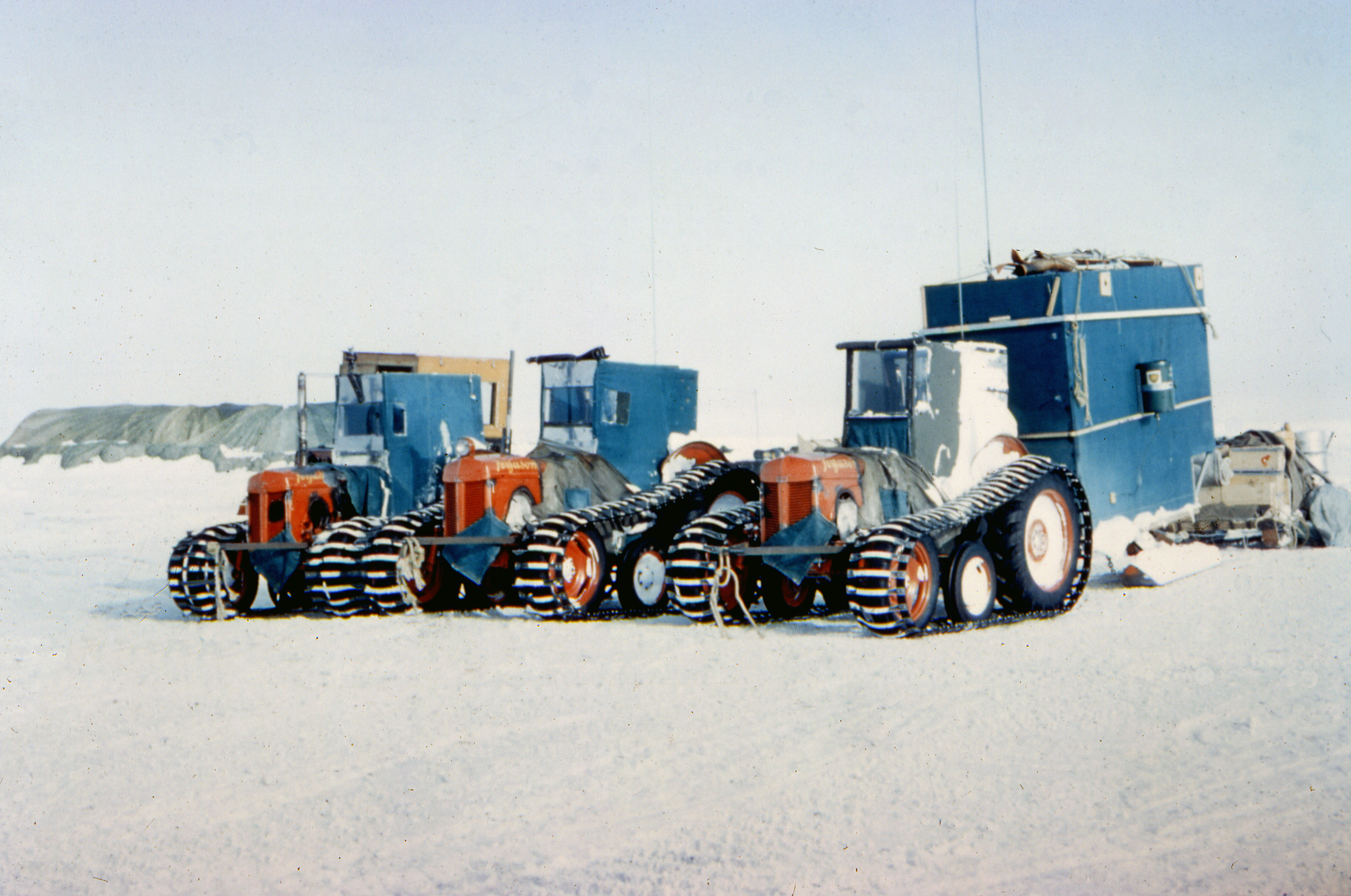
Commonwealth Trans-Antarctic Expedition

A fleet of seven Ferguson TE-20s was used on the 1955–58 Commonwealth Trans-Antarctic Expedition which was led by Edmund Hillary. Four petrol-engined and three diesel models were used. Some were supplied as half-tracks, with steerable front skis, whilst others of the New Zealand team were fitted with an extra wheel on each side and full caterpillar tracks, developed by the expedition in the Antarctic. In both cases, the track kits were easily removable and in light conditions the tractors were used on standard wheels and tyres. A canvas cabin was added for windproofing. Other than this, the tractors were totally standard – two were even fitted with a standard farmyard hydraulic front-loader for loading and unloading supplies. Reports were made at regular intervals to the Ferguson company and these show the tractors to have been reliable and effective – being capable of climbing a 1-in-7 slope of "hard polished ice where a man cannot walk without crampons", as well as operating in conditions of −10 degrees Fahrenheit. Under Hillary these tractors were driven to the South Pole, becoming the first vehicles to be driven to the pole, and the first overland journey to the pole since Captain Scott. The tractors were left at the pole for the use of American researchers. Two of the tractors used by Hillary's party were repatriated to New Zealand. One is on display along with other British Trans-Antarctic Expedition vehicles in the Canterbury Museum in Christchurch and the other is held at the Museum of Technology and Transport in Auckland.

One diesel (TEF-20) example, TEF320709 known as Betsy, earned a place in the Guinness Book of Records in May 2003 when Terry Williams drove it 3,176 miles (5,111 km) around the coastline of Britain, gaining the record for the longest journey undertaken by tractor. Betsy was donated to the Friends of Ferguson Heritage group in 2004, and can be seen on display at the Yorkshire Museum of Farming in York.

== In popular culture ==
Between 1992 and 2015, a TEA-20 was depicted on the New Zealand five-dollar note. There was a portrait of Sir Edmund Hillary on the obverse (front), with one of the tractors used in his Commonwealth Trans-Antarctic Expedition at the bottom-left corner. A Ferguson tractor was also depicted on a New Zealand $1.50 postage stamp as part of a set of five commemorating the life of Sir Edmund Hillary, issued in 2008.

A TE20 with a cab makes a brief cameo in the sixth episode, Countrycide, of the British Science-Fiction series, Torchwood. It is seen briefly when the team make their way through a village, investigating a series of mysterious deaths. It then reappears in a more prominent role in the climax of the episode, when Jack Harkness smashes it through a wall in order to break in to a pub and rescue the other team members, who are being held hostage.

A TE20 is the star of a TV series for preschool children, The Little Grey Fergie, which premiered in the UK on 17 October 2013. The show is based on the Norwegian children's story and TV series Den lille traktoren Gråtass.

Australian folk musician Peter Pentland released an album in 1979 (enlarged 2001) Me Beaut Little Fergie Tractor. Track 6 is the song "Fergie Tractor".
