= Ferguson-Brown Company =

Defunct Irish agricultural machinery company

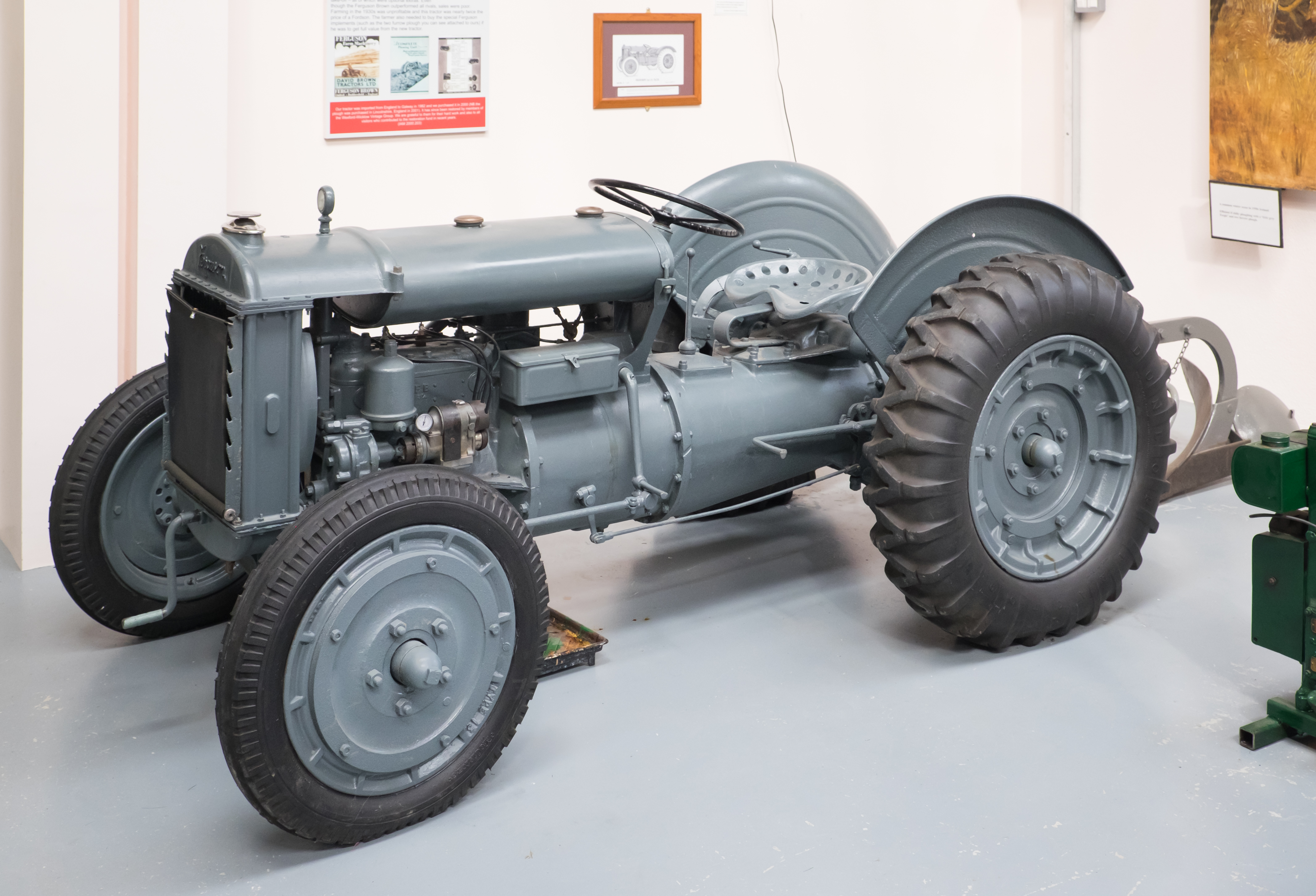
Ferguson-Brown Model A tractor (produced 1936–1939)

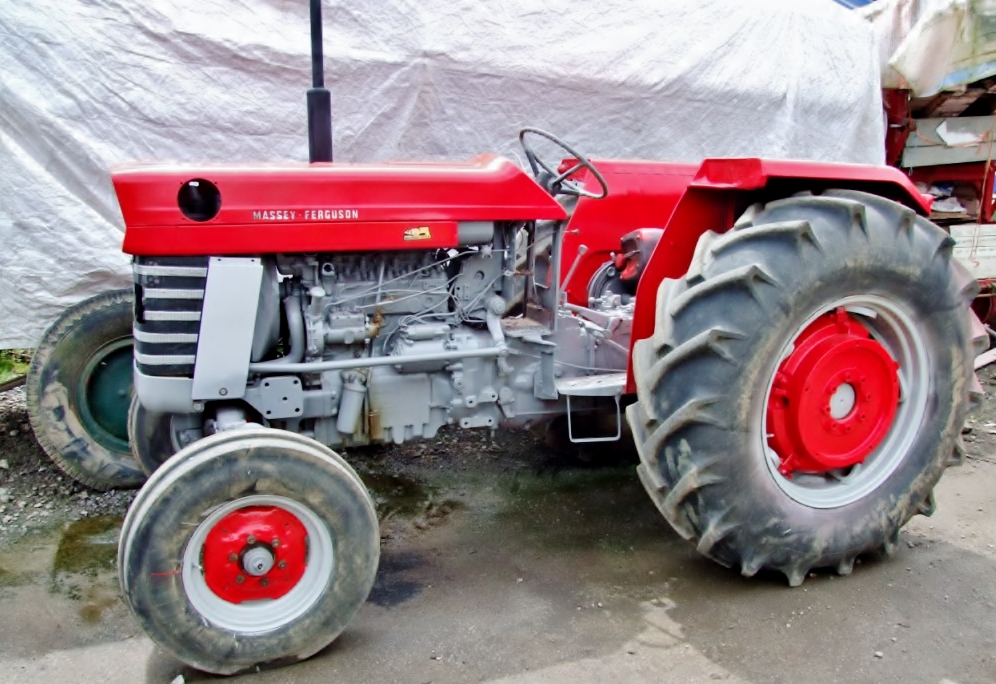
Massey Ferguson Tractor

The Ferguson-Brown Company was a Northern Irish agricultural machinery manufacturing company formed by Harry Ferguson in partnership with David Brown.

Ferguson-Brown produced the Model A Ferguson-Brown tractor incorporating a Ferguson-designed hydraulic three-point linkage hitch. Of the 1,356 produced 400 of the tractors were sold in Norway, which was the only export market. The early tractors were fitted with the Coventry Climax model E engine which was a descendant of the American Hercules engine as fitted to the prototype "Black tractor" later the engine manufacture was taken on by David Brown Ltd. who made a number of improvements such as a deeper sump, some of the earlier tractors suffered from oil starvation on hillside work. It has been narrowed down by surviving examples that the engine change from the Coventry Climax to the David Brown took place around tractors serial numbers 525 to 528. Harry Ferguson surmised that the tractor hitch was the key to having a better plough and designed a simpler tractor attachment for it.

== Agreement with Ford ==
In 1938 Ferguson made a handshake agreement with Henry Ford to produce Ferguson System Ford-Ferguson tractors using Ferguson's own self-regulating three-point hitch system, beginning with the Ford-Ferguson 9N tractor. This tractor is recognizable by the blue Ford emblem on the front of the hood and the Ferguson System emblem on the grille. The three-point hitch soon became the favourite hitch attachment system among farmers in North America and around the world. This tractor model also included a rear Power Take Off (PTO) shaft that could be used to power three-point hitch mounted implements such as sickle-bar mowers. This PTO location set the standard for future tractor developments.

== Agreement with Standard ==
In December 1945 Standard Motor Company Limited announced that an arrangement had been made to manufacture Ferguson's tractors. Standard's newly acquired factory at Banner Lane in Coventry would be used for the project. These tractors would be for the Eastern hemisphere, with Ferguson tractors built by Ford in America for the Western hemisphere. Production was expected to start in 1946. Following conversion of the former WW2 aircraft factory. Implements would be sourced and sold separately by Ferguson.

== Split with Ford ==
In 1946 the Ford Motor Company parted from Ferguson, following several disagreements and a protracted lawsuit followed, involving Ford's continued use of Ferguson's patents. Ford altered the hydraulic design of its postwar tractors to avoid Ferguson's hydraulic system patent, but continued to produce machines equipped with the basic Ferguson hitch arrangement. The postwar Ford 8N, equipped with Ferguson's three-point hitch, became the top-selling tractor of all time in North America.

== Ferguson TE20 ==
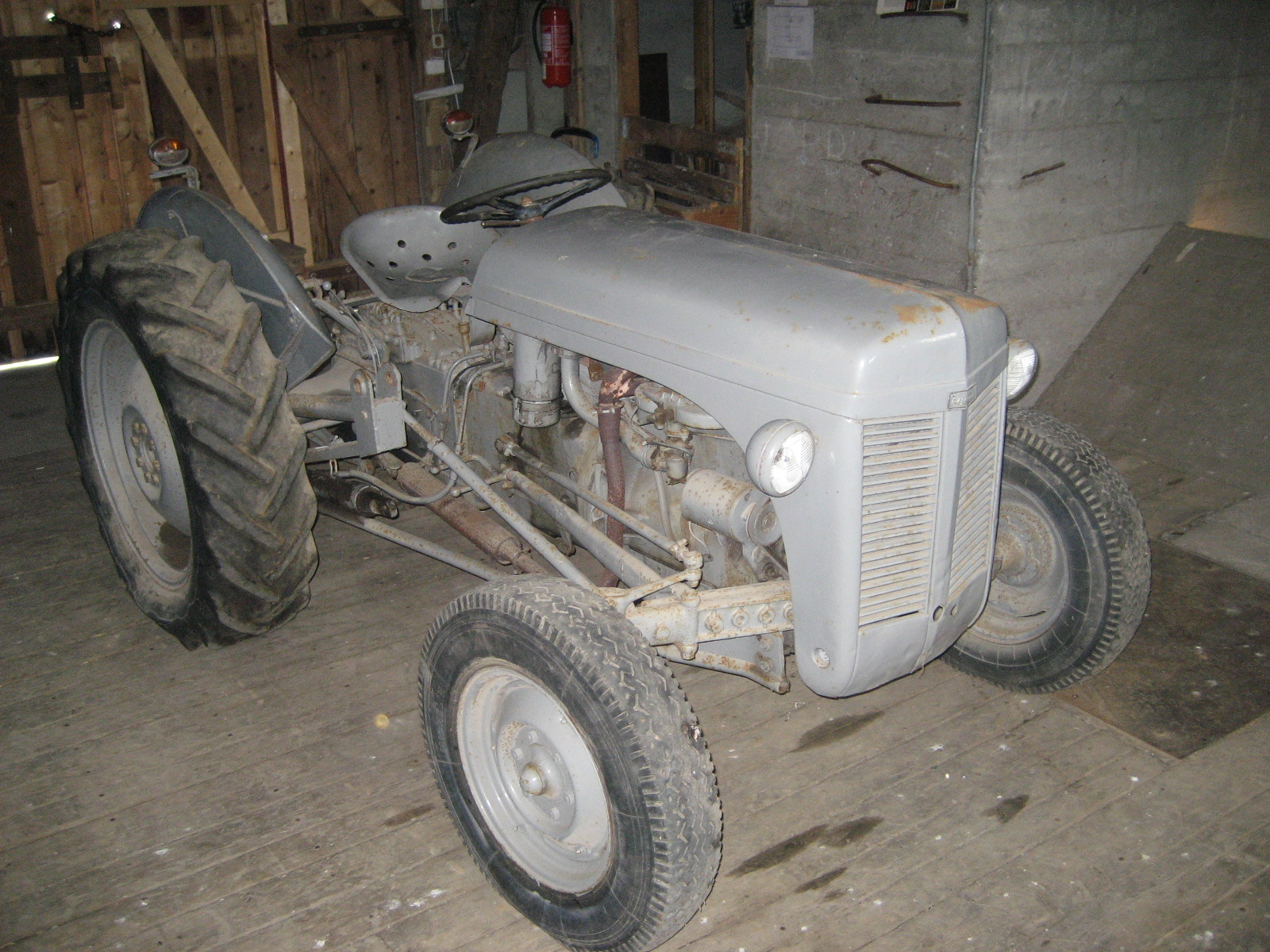
Ferguson TE20

After the split with Ford, Ferguson took the opportunity to have the Standard Motor Company of the UK produce a new design, the Model TE20. The model name came from Tractor, England 20 horsepower (15 kW) but is affectionately known as the Little Grey Fergie. There were several variants of the TE20; the first tractors were designated TE20 Using an imported Continental Z120 engine. In 1948 the TEA20 was introduced with a Standard brand petrol engine, following the introduction of the TED20 which ran on TVO (tractor vapourising oil, similar to paraffin). Later a diesel model was introduced, the TEF20. There were other variants with narrow tracks for working in vineyards and orchards, such as the TEB20 and TEC20.

Over 500,000 Little Grey Fergies were built between 1946 and 1956, and many survive today. So successful was the TE20 that Ford nicknamed it the "Grey Menace" as sales of the tractor spread across the world. Some were used on an expedition to the South Pole in 1958 by Sir Edmund Hillary, a testament to the durability of the machine. Ford ultimately settled the legal proceedings with a multimillion-dollar sum that allowed Ferguson to further expand his own manufacturing interests.

There is a monument in Wentworth on the junction of the Darling and Murray Rivers in commemorating the time in 1956 when both rivers flooded and a fleet of Little Grey Fergies was used to build defensive banks to save the town.

== Ferguson Park ==
Ferguson built a plant in Detroit where the TO20, TO30, and F40 were assembled. He named it Ferguson Park, perhaps because the 8Ns were then being assembled at Highland Park. Massey Ferguson stopped production at this plant in 1984. Part of the plant is currently in use by an auto parts manufacturer.

== Three-point linkage ==
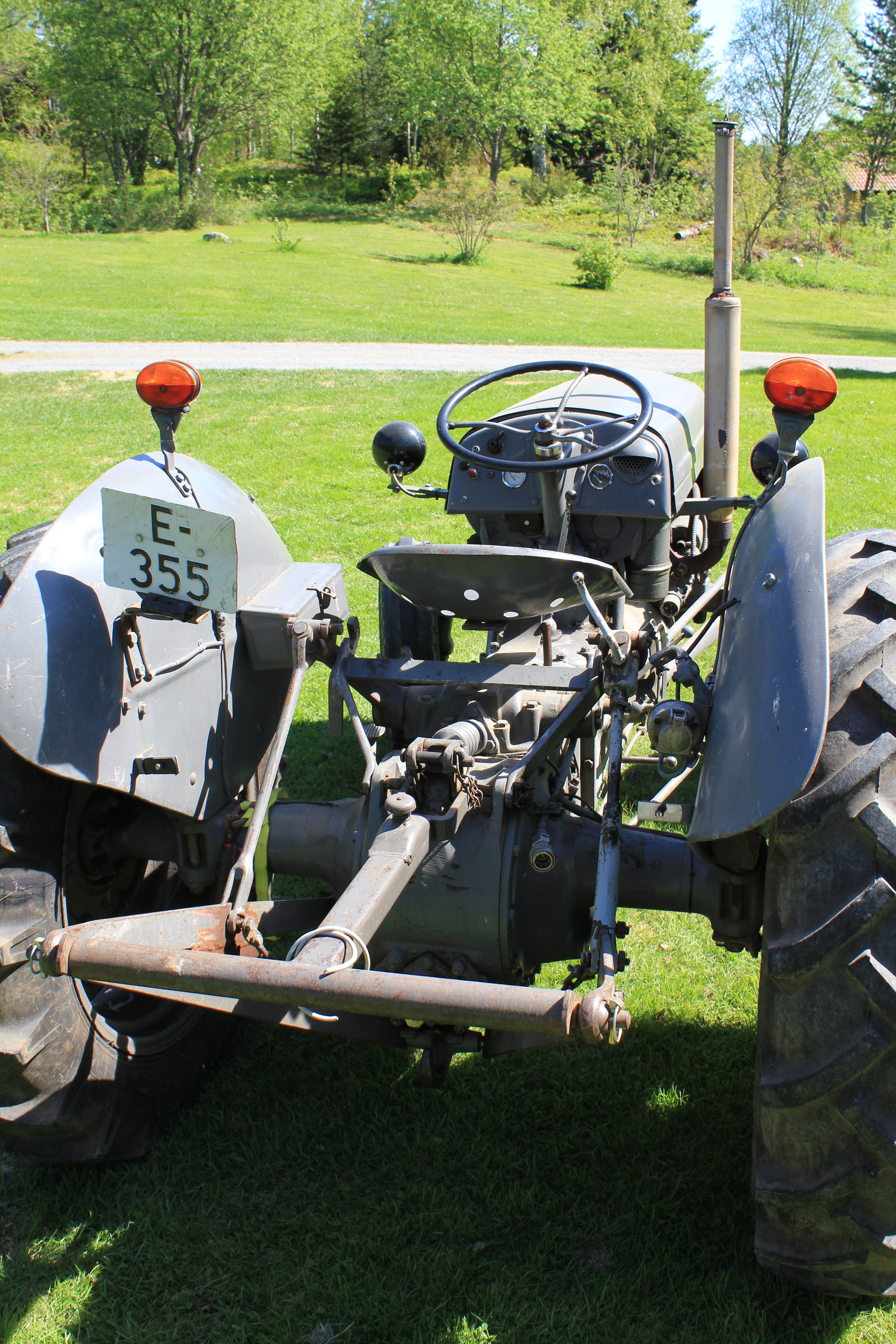
Three-point linkage

The principal feature of the Ferguson System was the three-point linkage. This allowed trailed implements to be supported on a hydraulic system. Two drag links attached under the rear axle with a single compression link connected to the upper rear transmission case automatically regulating the hydraulic suspension's height. This allowed lighter implement to be used, with no attached wheels or separate manual controls. By assisting the tractor to maintain traction from a combined drag and rotary force to the axle, which kept the rear driving wheels on the ground, the front steering wheels had improved contact with the ground. Consequently, the "rearing and bucking" of overloaded tractors was reduced, making tractors much safer for the operator.

- Ferguson design implements
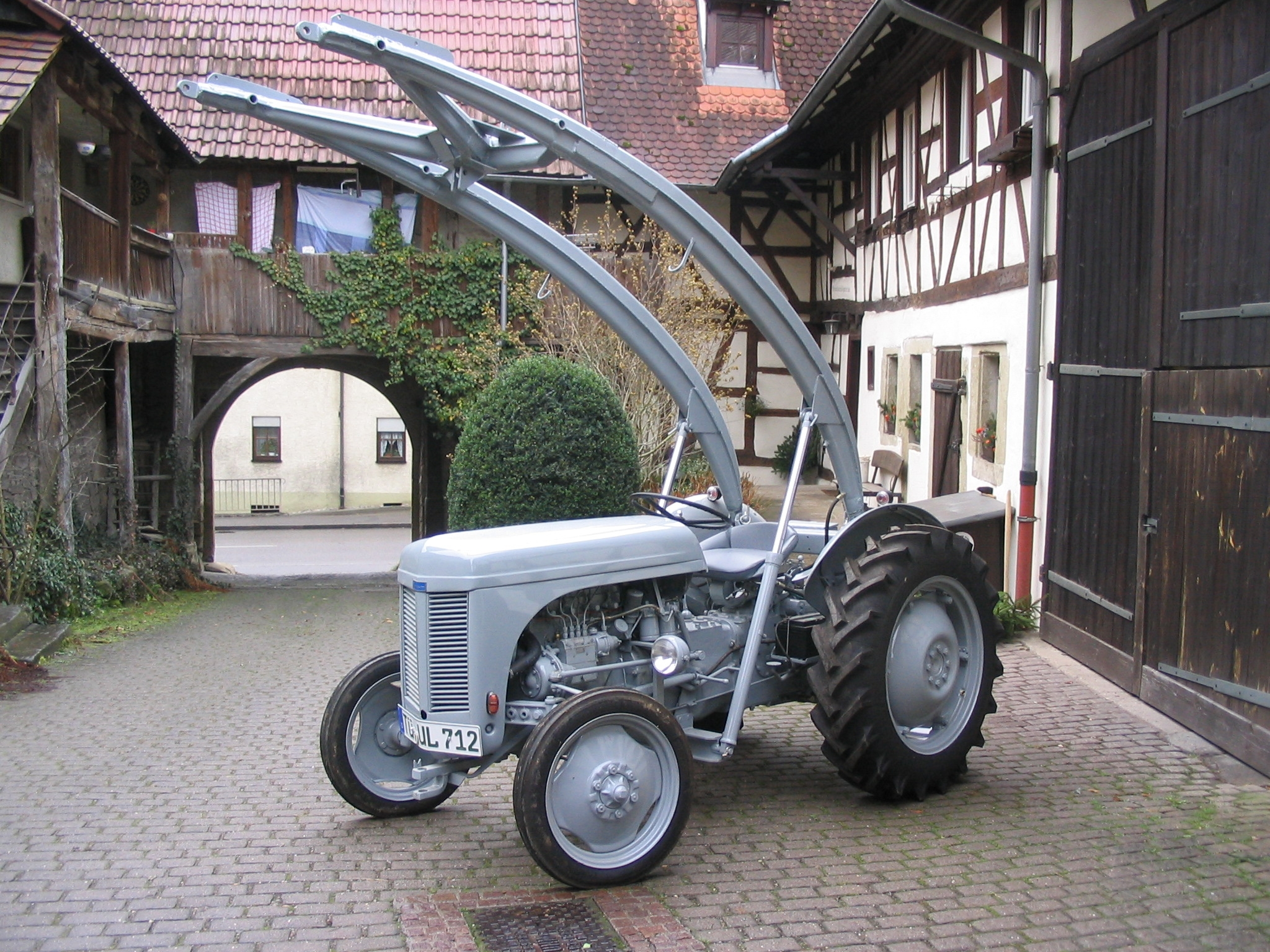
Banana loader

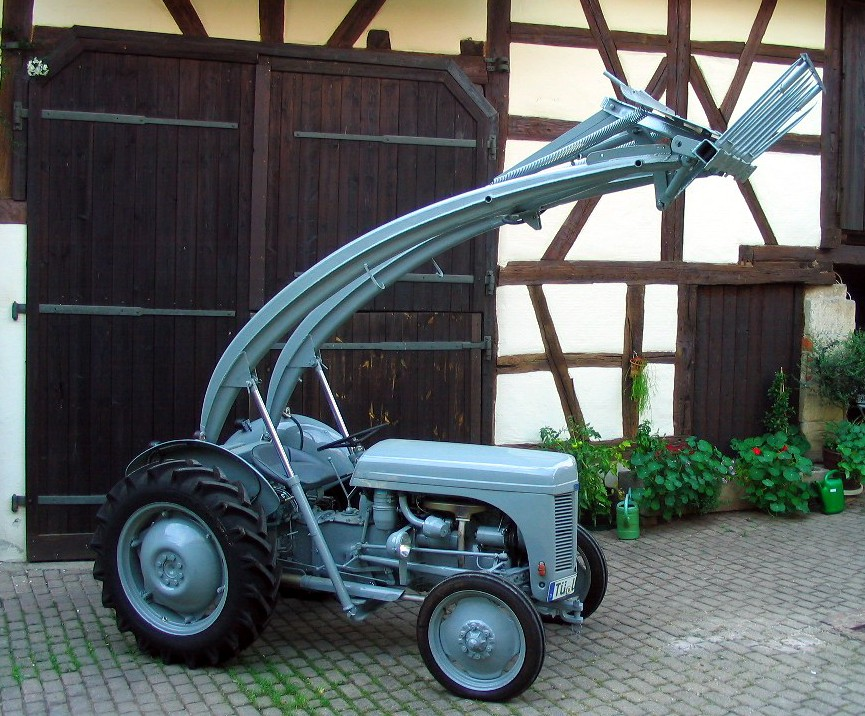
Banana Loader with Muck Fork attachment

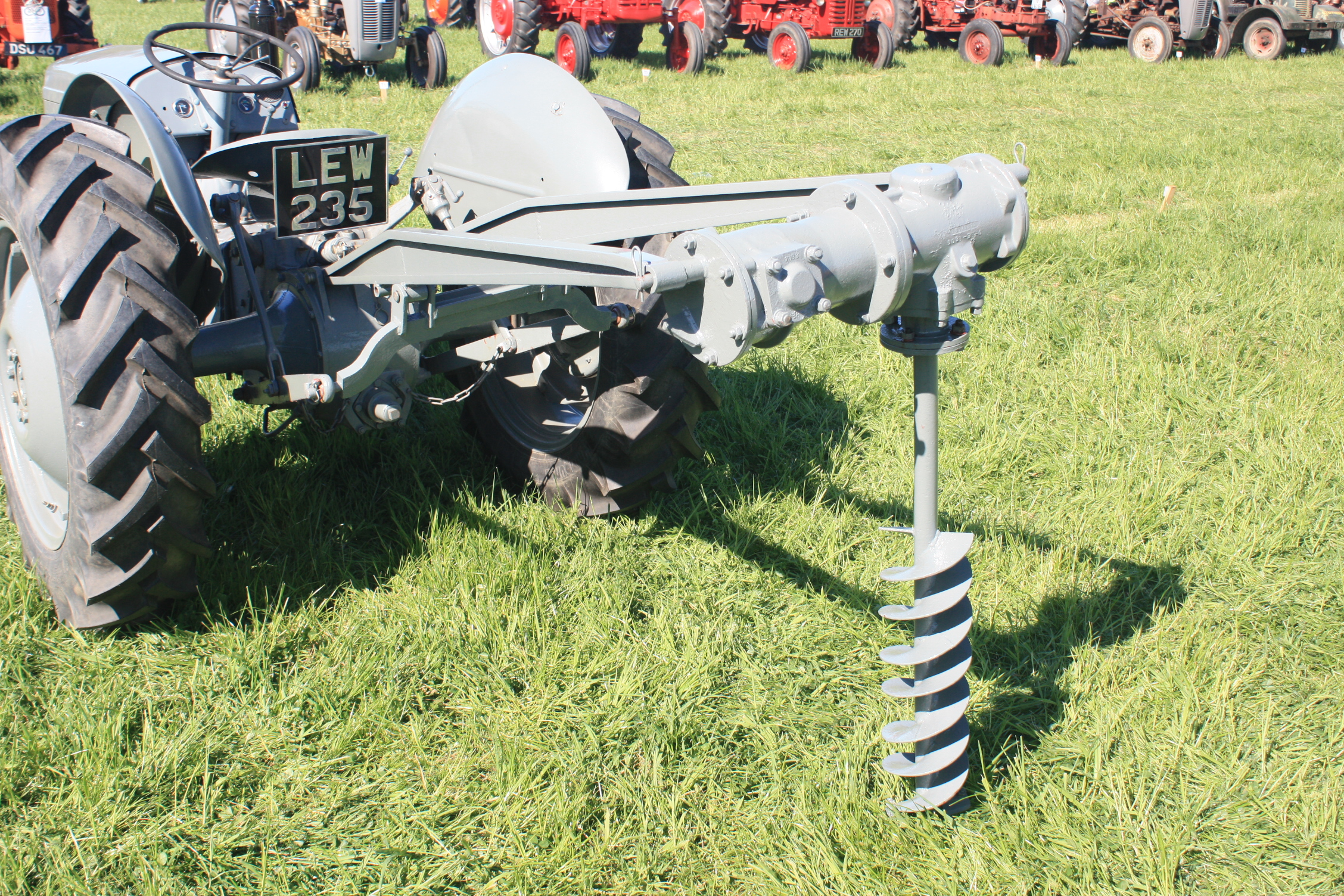
Posthole borer

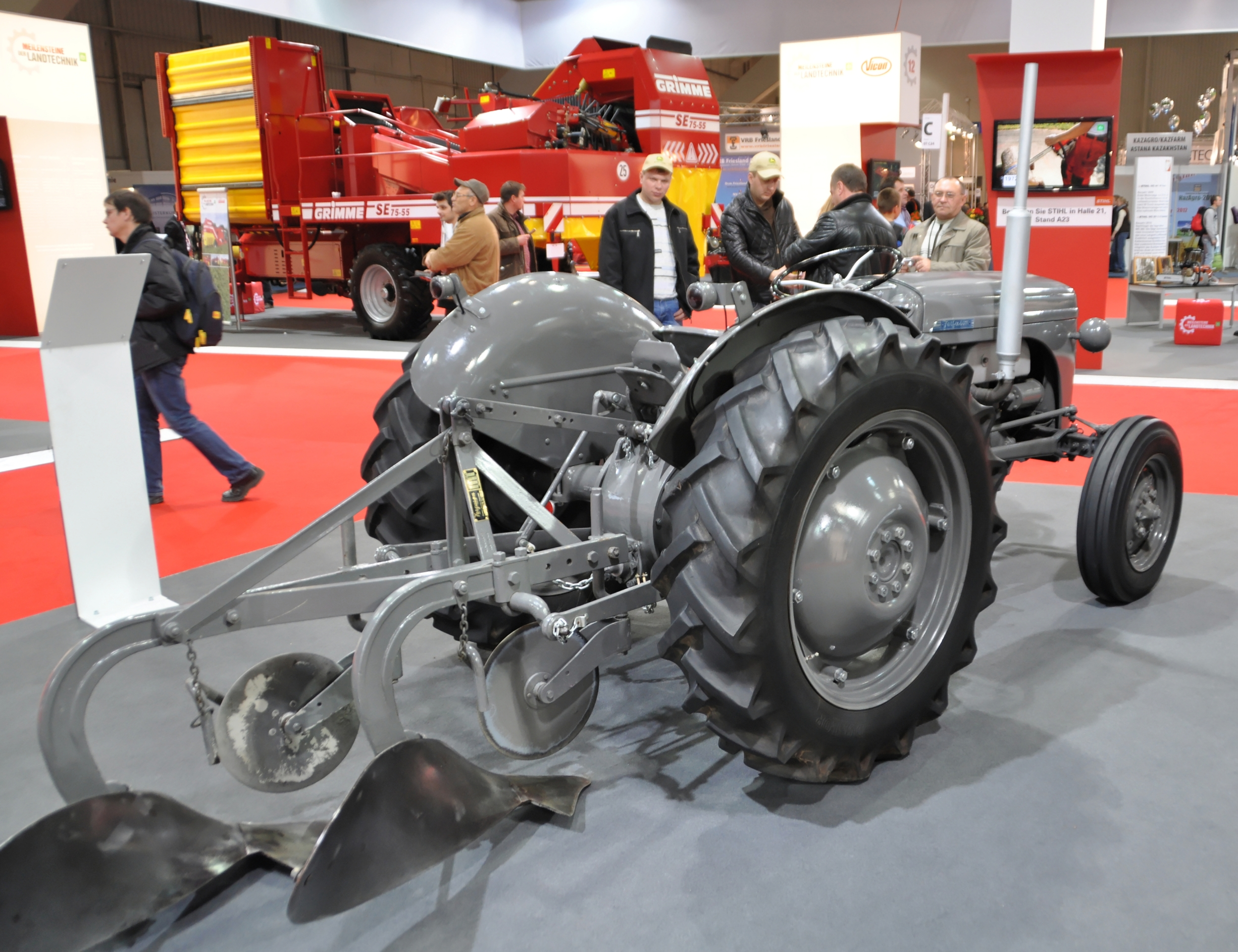
Plough

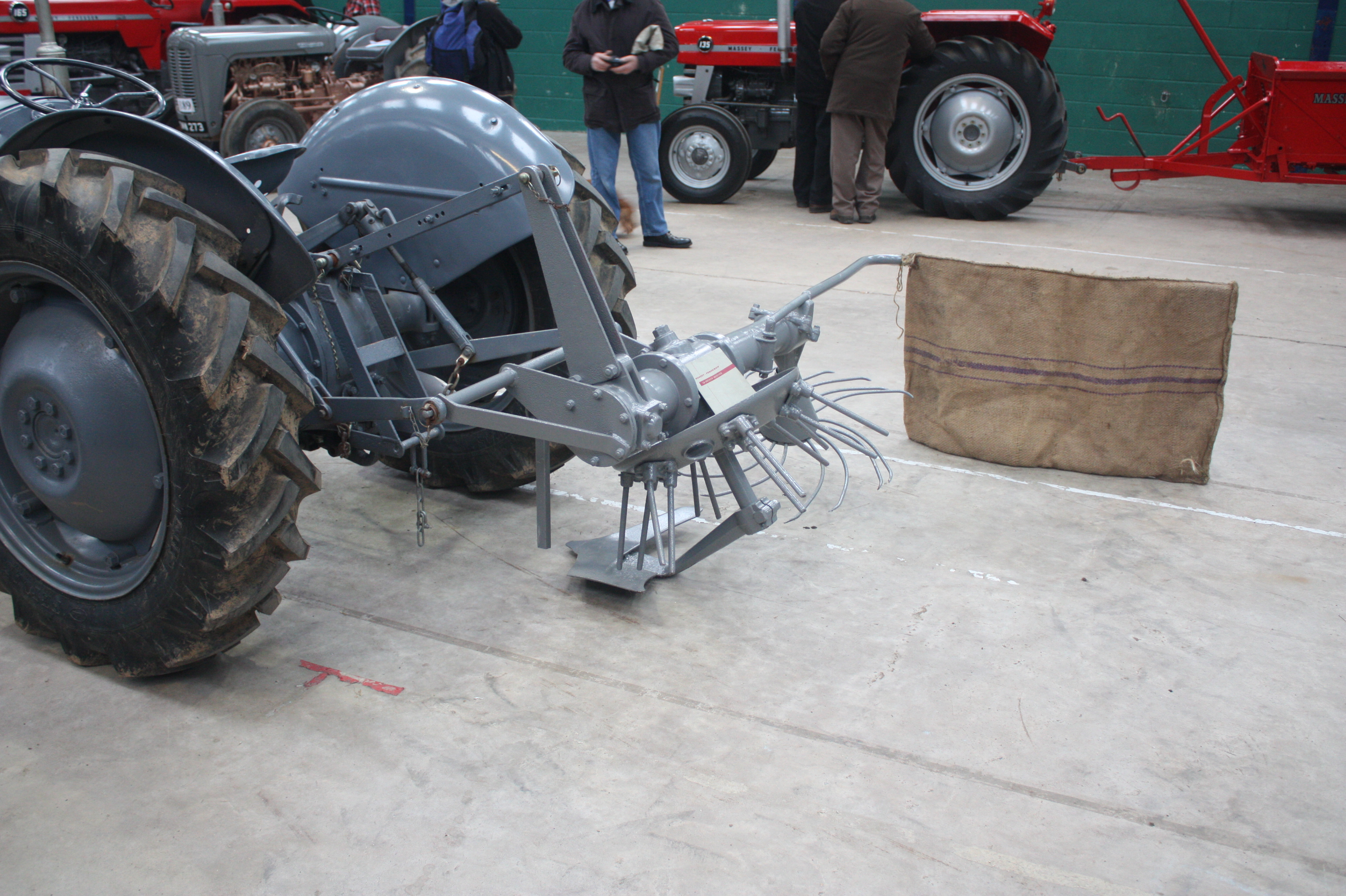
Potato spinner

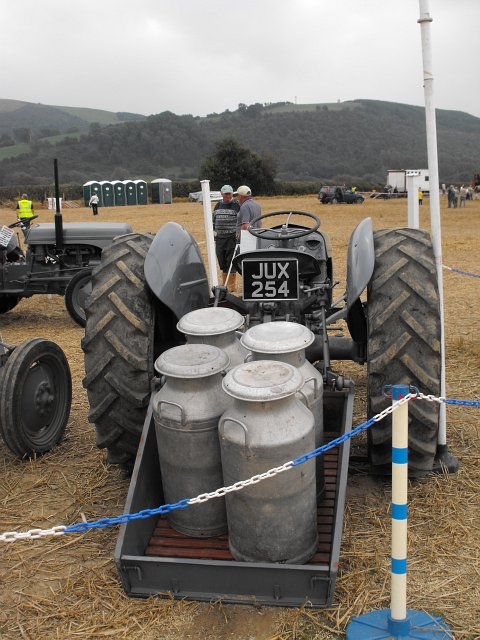
Lifting trailer

== Other innovations ==
Ferguson's designs, for tractors, were the first with single-wheel brakes that allowed the driver to turn sharply by braking the inside wheel. The TE20 was one of the first tractors to have a four-speed gearbox, with integrated differential, and a hydraulic system.

== Merger with Massey-Harris ==
In 1953 Ferguson and Massey-Harris merged, and the combined company Massey-Harris-Ferguson (later shortened to Massey Ferguson) became the manufacturer of the tractors and other designs. By then, many manufacturers had developed their own three-point linkages, and the linkage had become standardised worldwide.

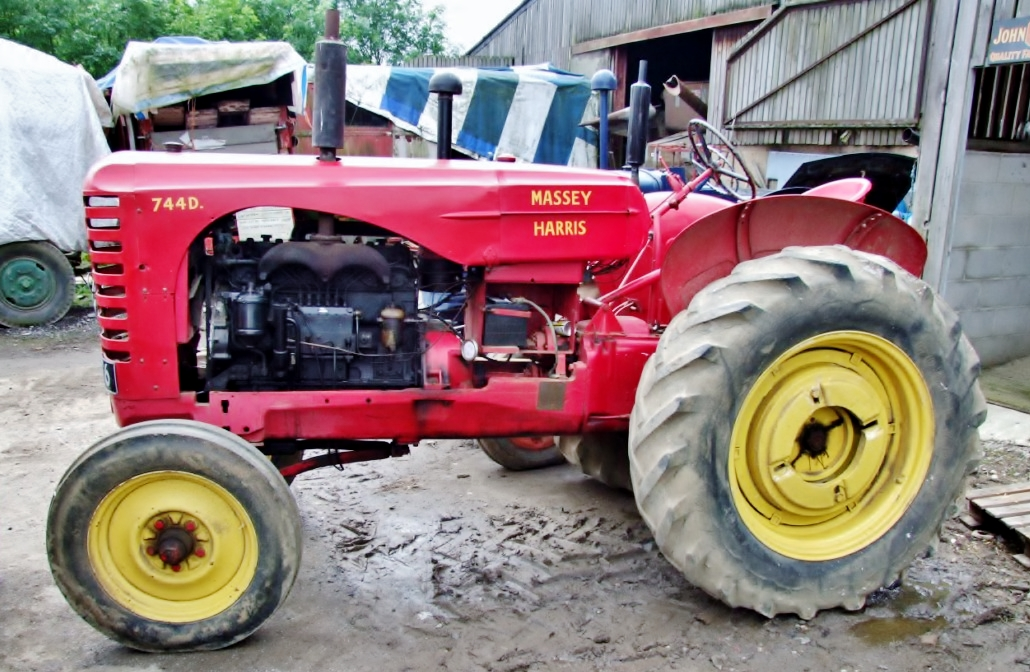
Massey-Harris 744D tractor

== See also ==
- Ford N Series Tractors
- Massey Ferguson
- LEGO, who first modeled a plastic toy in Ferguson-Brown's likeness in 1951
