= Massey Ferguson 135 =

Tractor model

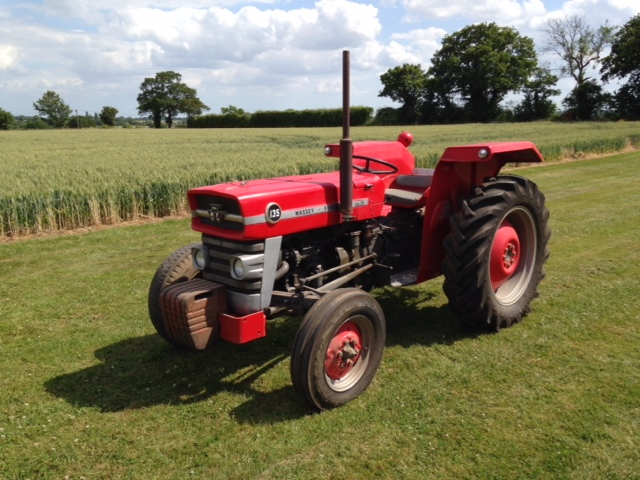
- A 1965 MF135
- Type: Agricultural, industrial
- Manufacturer: Massey Ferguson
- Production: 1964–1975
- Weight: 2,940–3,130 pounds (1,330–1,420 kg)
- Propulsion: Mid-engine, rear-wheel drive layout
- Gross power: 45.5 horsepower (33.9 kW)
- Preceded by: Massey Ferguson 35
- Succeeded by: Massey Ferguson 235

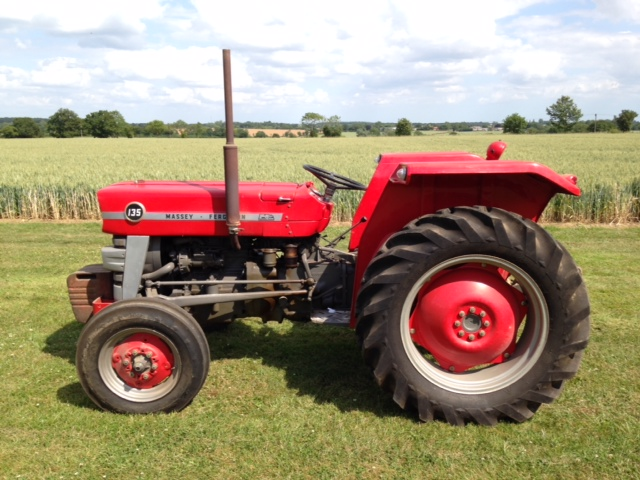
A 1965 MF135

The Massey Ferguson 135 (MF135) was a tractor produced by Massey Ferguson.

== History ==
The MF135 was the first of the MF100 range, and was a successor to the MF35. Production began in 1964, with the MF135 and the 165 and 175 all launched at the 1964 Smithfield Show. A smaller MF130 was produced for the French market.

A change to the design was made in 1965 to make the bodywork more angular. The design was updated in 1971, which included a larger fuel tank.

Production continued in the UK until 1979, although it ended in the US in 1975 when it was succeeded by the MF235. A total of 413,153 units were produced at Coventry between 1965 and 1979.

Along with the MF165, it was one of the most popular tractors of the era. The tractor is still sought after in the 21st century in the second-hand market due to demand in developing countries, one of the main reasons being its simple mechanical construction and high reliability, as well as familiarity with the model from farmers' experiences studying at British agricultural colleges.

== Specification ==
The MF135 was most commonly fitted with a 45hp 2.5L Perkins AD3.152 3-cylinder diesel engine. Alternatives included the Perkins AG3.152 petrol variant or a 37hp 4-cylinder Continental petrol engine in the US. It was 2 wheel drive and the gearbox had 6 forward and 2 reverse gears, (3+1, high / low range) with a mechanical clutch. Later versions (1970 onwards) came with an eight-speed transmission (four forward and one reverse across two ranges, high and low). There was a multi-power option giving twelve forward and four reverse gears, plus a hydraulic clutch.
