= Banner Lane =

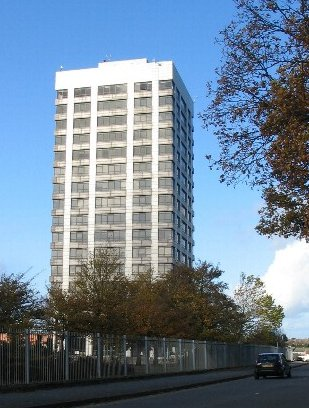
Banner Lane office tower, circa 2009. The building has since been demolished.

Banner Lane was the site of a wartime shadow factory in Coventry, England, run by Standard Motor Company and dedicated to making Bristol Hercules aero engines. The war-surplus plant was taken over by Standard in 1946 to make Ferguson tractors and it was made Standard's registered office. After the 1959 sale of Standard's part-ownership of the tractor partnership to Massey Ferguson, it became Massey Ferguson's base for tractor-building operations until production ceased in 2002 and the site was redeveloped for housing.

== Shadow factory ==
In May 1939, the Air Ministry sought a facility to manufacture Bristol Hercules aero engines and construction of a plant commenced later that year on an 80-acre (320,000 m^{2}) green-field site just outside Coventry. With over 1 million square feet (93,000 m^{2}) of floor space, the Banner Lane site was one of the largest shadow factories erected at Government expense, costing £1.7 million to build and set up for production. The new plant missed the summer and autumn 1940 bombing raids of the Coventry Blitz and was fully functioning before the end of that year. Its curious similarity to other shadow factories was because the buildings were designed by the Government's own architects.

The business was run, for a £40,000 per annum management fee, by Standard Motor Company enabling products and plant to benefit from Standard's expertise in making similar, if much less complex, products. With some of the parts being produced at Rover's shadow factory at Acocks Green, the Hercules engines were complex machines of 38.7 litres (2,360 cu in) capacity having 14 cylinders in two radial rows using sleeve valves rather than poppet valves, and with an output of 1,290–1,735 horsepower (960–1,294 kW) depending on the application.

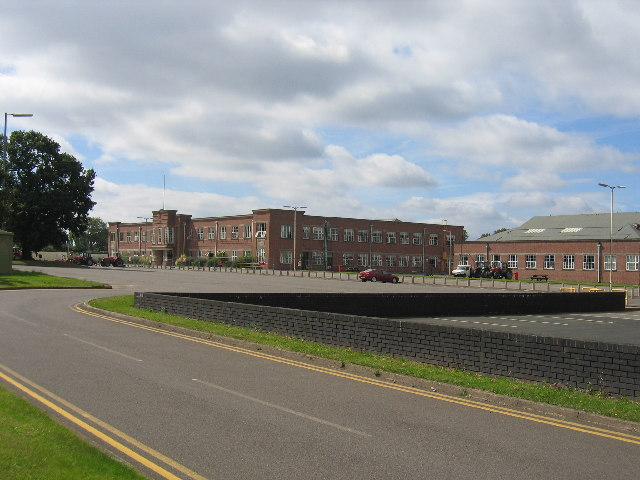
Banner Lane plant

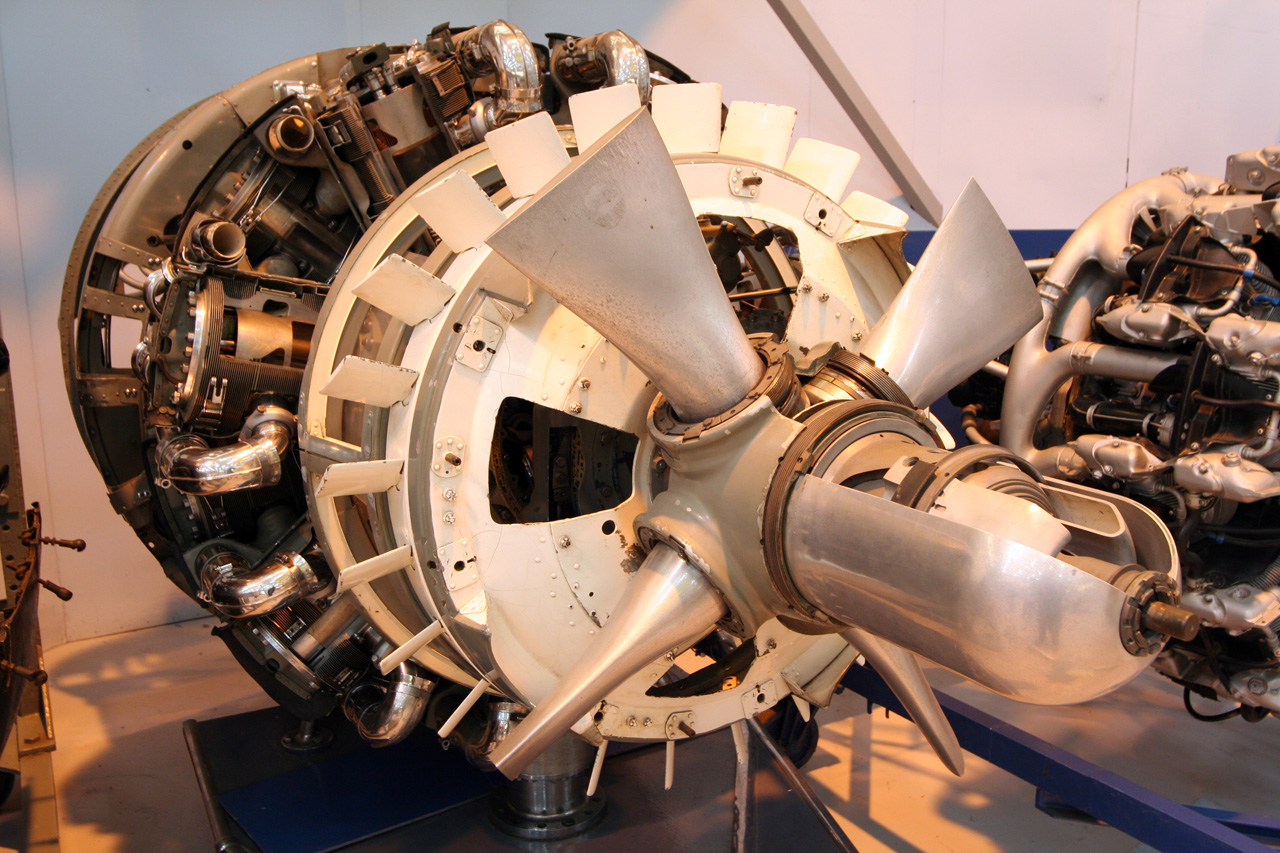
A Bristol Hercules bare engine cutaway display.
The engine was 50 inches (1.3 m) in diameter.

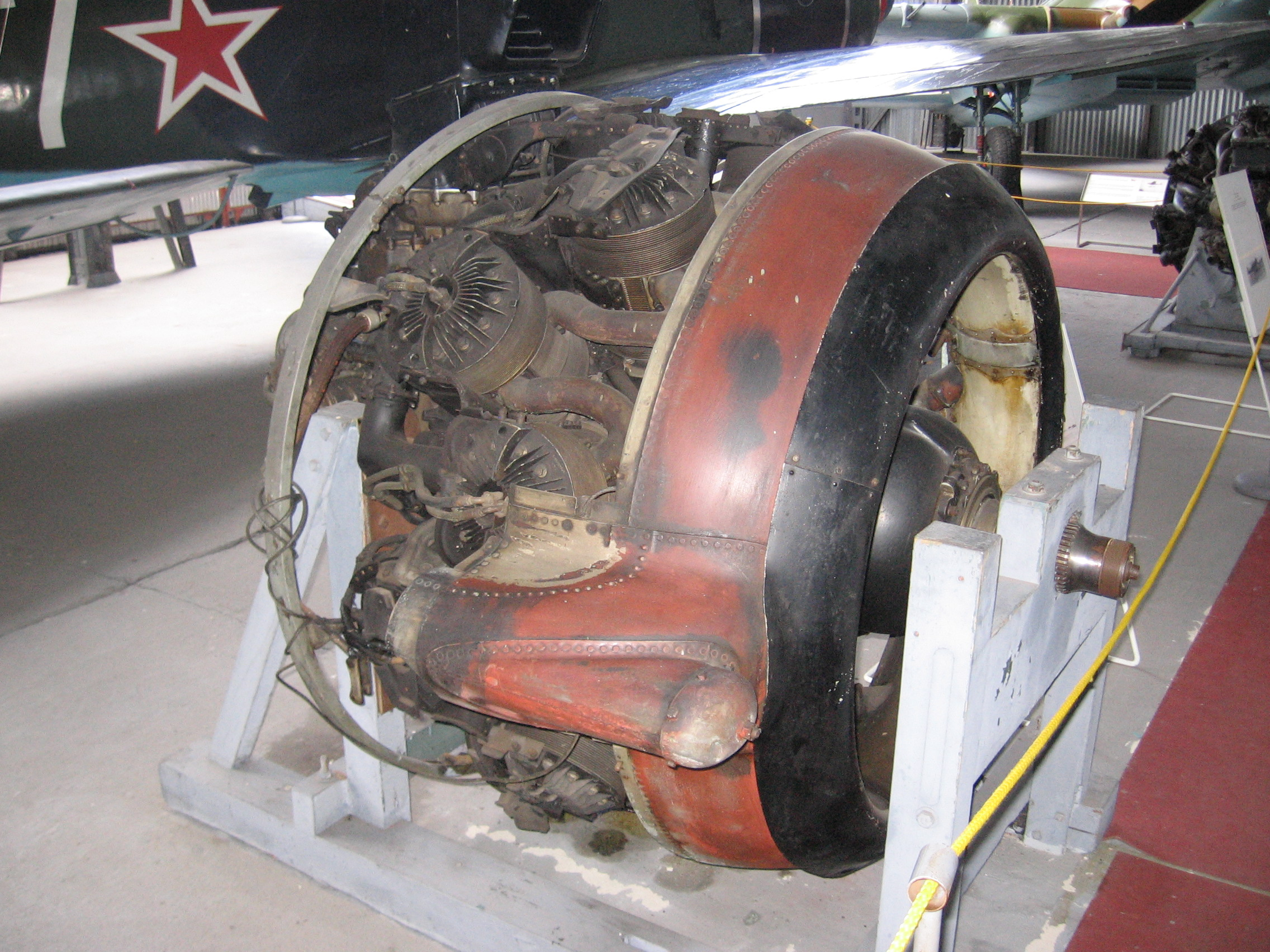
Engine example on display at the
Prague Aviation Museum, Kbely

When production ended in 1945 more than 20,000 Hercules engines were built.

Other wartime products managed by Standard but made at Canley, the location of a further shadow factory nearby, included the Bristol Beaufighter and De Havilland Mosquito twin-engined fighter bombers together with a variety of other matériel.

== Tractor production ==
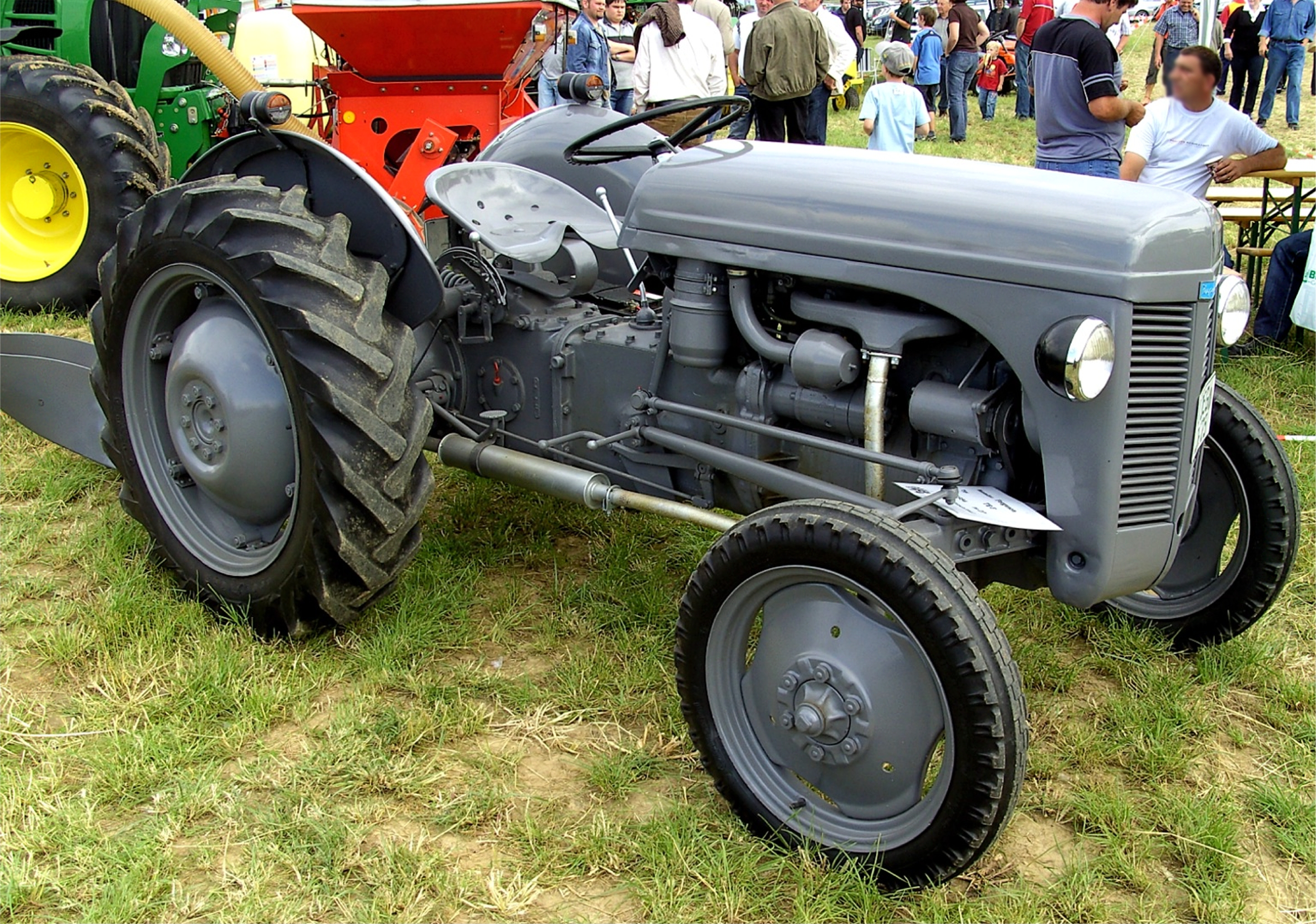
Ferguson TE tractor

After the war the shadow factory was no longer required by Bristol. However, discussions between Standard and Harry Ferguson in 1945 to build Ferguson tractors in the UK resulted in Standard signing a 10-year lease for the Banner Lane plant costing £36,000 per annum. The intention was to build up to 500 tractors per day for which Standard would receive a fee for each one produced, and from mid-1946 until the end of 1947 over 20,800 new tractors had been built. At the height of production over 6,000 people were employed, and in 10 years more than 500,000 Ferguson TE tractors had been produced at Banner Lane.

Disagreements between Standard and Ferguson culminated in Standard breaking all connections with both Ferguson and tractor production in the summer of 1959. By this time Harry Ferguson Ltd had formed a merger with Massey Harris to become Massey-Harris-Ferguson, later shortened to Massey Ferguson. All Standard's tractor assets were sold to Massey Ferguson on 31 August 1959 and Banner Lane entered the sole ownership of Massey Ferguson.

By 2000, the plant covered 1.8 million ft^{2} (170,000 m^{2}) and tractor output was in excess of 70,000 per annum, the majority for export; however, increasing numbers of Massey Ferguson tractors were being built elsewhere, most notably at Beauvais in France. In order to rationalise production it was decided that either Beauvais or Banner Lane would be shut down, but pressure from the French Government and workers made Beauvais the more difficult of the two to close, sealing Banner Lane's fate. The tractors production line closed on Christmas Eve 2002 when the last tractor, number 3,307,996 was completed. The factory continued some operations into 2003 though, finishing partially complete tractors, as well as providing gearboxes and other machined parts to Beauvais whilst they prepared for production of the existing 4300 series which would continue there until 2004. This final Banner Lane-designed tractor series was then succeeded in the same year by the new 5400 series and lesser known Finnish-built 4400 series (Badge engineered Valtra A series).

== Demise ==
The enormous task of decommissioning, demolition of the plant and site clearance ended with the demolition of the 16-storey tower block on 8 July 2012 using high-explosive charges. and a housing development called Bannerbrook Park now occupies the site on which it has been planned to build the region of 1,000 new homes, together with an entire infrastructure including shops and a school.

A Massey Ferguson memorial to the tractor production facility has been erected on the site.
